= National Register of Historic Places listings in Randolph County, West Virginia =

Location of Randolph County in West Virginia

This is a list of the National Register of Historic Places listings in Randolph County, West Virginia.

This is intended to be a complete list of the properties and districts on the National Register of Historic Places in Randolph County, West Virginia, United States. The locations of National Register properties and districts for which the latitude and longitude coordinates are included below, may be seen in an online map.

There are 39 properties and districts listed on the National Register in the county, 1 of which is a National Historic Landmark.

This National Park Service list is complete through NPS recent listings posted January 2, 2026.

Contents: Counties in West Virginia

Barbour - Berkeley - Boone - Braxton - Brooke - Cabell - Calhoun - Clay - Doddridge - Fayette - Gilmer - Grant - Greenbrier - Hampshire - Hancock - Hardy - Harrison - Jackson - Jefferson - Kanawha - Lewis - Lincoln - Logan - Marion - Marshall - Mason - McDowell - Mercer - Mineral - Mingo - Monongalia - Monroe - Morgan - Nicholas - Ohio - Pendleton - Pleasants - Pocahontas - Preston - Putnam - Raleigh - Randolph - Ritchie - Roane - Summers - Taylor - Tucker - Tyler - Upshur - Wayne - Webster - Wetzel - Wirt - Wood - Wyoming

== Current listings ==
	Name on the Register	Image	Date listed	Location	City or town	Description
1	Albert and Liberal Arts Halls	Albert and Liberal Arts Halls	August 29, 1979 (#79002599)	Davis and Elkins College campus 38°55′49″N 79°50′46″W	Elkins	
2	Baldwin-Chandlee Supply Company-Valley Supply Company	Baldwin-Chandlee Supply Company-Valley Supply Company	December 4, 1998 (#98001478)	Junction of 10th and Railroad Sts. 38°55′18″N 79°51′14″W	Elkins	
3	Beverly Historic District	Beverly Historic District	January 11, 1980 (#80004040)	US 219/US 250/WV 55/WV 92; Roughly bounded by Dodson Run, Files Cr., Tygart Valley R. & Lewis St. 38°50′29″N 79°52′30″W	Beverly	Second set of addresses represents a boundary increase 2014-12-16
4	Blackman-Bosworth Store	Blackman-Bosworth Store	April 14, 1975 (#75001897)	Main and Court Sts. 38°50′27″N 79°52′32″W	Beverly	
5	Butcher Hill Historic District	Butcher Hill Historic District	November 9, 1989 (#89001784)	East of Beverly; 38°50′33″N 79°51′02″W	Beverly	
6	Cheat Summit Fort	Cheat Summit Fort	September 28, 1990 (#90001445)	County Route 250/4, west of FR 233 at White Top; 38°37′28″N 79°52′36″W	Huttonsville	
7	Davis and Elkins Historic District	Davis and Elkins Historic District	June 19, 1996 (#96001129)	Davis and Elkins College campus 38°55′48″N 79°50′50″W	Elkins	
8	Davis & Elkins College Historic District	Davis & Elkins College Historic District	November 2, 2023 (#100009540)	Portions of Campus Drive, Harpertown Road, Graceland Drive, Allen Street & Residential Drive, and College Drive (Davis and Elkins College campus); 38°55′48″N 79°50′50″W	Elkins	
9	Davis Memorial Presbyterian Church	Davis Memorial Presbyterian Church	April 20, 1984 (#84003664)	450 Randolph Ave. 38°55′39″N 79°50′53″W	Elkins	
10	Day-Vandevander Mill	Day-Vandevander Mill	July 21, 1987 (#87001173)	WV 32; 38°55′57″N 79°31′16″W	Harman	
11	Downtown Elkins Historic District	Downtown Elkins Historic District	November 22, 1995 (#95001324)	Roughly bounded by Railroad Ave., 5th St., Randolph Ave., Henry Ave. and 1st St. 38°55′28″N 79°50′57″W	Elkins	
12	Elkins Milling Company	Elkins Milling Company	February 2, 2005 (#04001595)	2½ Railroad Ave. 38°55′23″N 79°51′05″W	Elkins	
13	Senator Stephen Benton Elkins House	Senator Stephen Benton Elkins House	September 2, 1982 (#82004329)	Davis and Elkins College campus 38°55′51″N 79°50′50″W	Elkins	
14	First Ward School	First Ward School	December 30, 2009 (#09001193)	S. Davis Ave. and 13th St. 38°55′03″N 79°51′06″W	Elkins	
15	Fort Marrow		July 30, 2010 (#10000511)	North corner U.S. Route 219 and County Route 219/16; 38°38′00″N 80°01′21″W	Huttonsville	Also known as Camp Elkwater
16	Glady Presbyterian Church and Manse	Glady Presbyterian Church and Manse	November 30, 2005 (#05001347)	Junction of Randolph Ave. and 1st St. 38°47′52″N 79°43′10″W	Glady	
17	Graceland	Graceland	September 17, 1970 (#70000666)	Davis and Elkins College campus 38°55′51″N 79°50′57″W	Elkins	
18	Graham-Davis Historic District		April 19, 2021 (#100006396)	Generally bounded by Randolph and South Randolph Aves., 11th St., Granny's Ln., and the Tygart Valley R. 38°55′21″N 79°50′42″W	Elkins	
19	Helvetia	Helvetia	November 29, 1978 (#78002810)	Junction of County Route 45 and County Route 46; 38°42′19″N 80°12′14″W	Helvetia	
20	E. E. Hutton House		June 11, 1975 (#75001898)	Junction of U.S. Routes 219 and 250 and Union St. 38°42′56″N 79°58′45″W	Huttonsville	
21	Dr. John C. Irons House	Dr. John C. Irons House	December 15, 1998 (#98001479)	116 2nd St. 38°55′25″N 79°50′58″W	Elkins	
22	Gov. H. Guy Kump House	Gov. H. Guy Kump House	August 18, 1983 (#04000319)	Randolph Ave. and 11th St. 38°55′04″N 79°50′33″W	Elkins	
23	Maplewood Cemetery		April 9, 2024 (#100010186)	301 Mapleview Drive; 38°56′24″N 79°51′04″W	Elkins	
24	Middle Mountain Cabins	Middle Mountain Cabins	September 27, 1990 (#90001447)	Eastern side of Middle Mountain Rd. at Camp Five Run, Monongahela National Forest; 38°41′18″N 79°44′03″W	Wymer	
25	New Deal Resources in Kumbrabow State Forest Historic District		August 7, 2019 (#100002855)	219/16, Kumbrabow Rd. 38°37′52″N 80°05′04″W	Huttonsville	
26	Fred A. Perley House		September 14, 1988 (#88001453)	Address Restricted	Jenningston	
27	Pinecrest	Pinecrest	December 11, 1979 (#79002600)	Kerens Hill; 38°55′53″N 79°51′11″W	Elkins	
28	Randolph County Courthouse and Jail	Randolph County Courthouse and Jail	November 28, 1980 (#80004041)	Randolph Ave. and High St. 38°55′22″N 79°50′35″W	Elkins	
29	Rich Mountain Battlefield	Rich Mountain Battlefield	July 17, 1992 (#92000899)	6 miles west of Beverly on Rich Mountain Rd. (County Route 37/8); 38°52′01″N 79°56′41″W	Beverly	
30	Riverside School	Riverside School	December 30, 2009 (#09001194)	Block No. 1, River St. 38°55′20″N 79°50′52″W	Elkins	
31	Scott Hill	Scott Hill	December 22, 2008 (#08001240)	2000 Livingston Ave. 38°54′48″N 79°51′40″W	Elkins	
32	See Mail Pouch Barn		January 8, 2026 (#100012515)	21129 Seneca Trail; 38°36′03″N 80°01′06″W	Mingo vicinity	
33	See-Ward House		August 25, 1988 (#88000671)	U.S. Routes 219/250; 38°43′31″N 79°58′22″W	Mill Creek	
34	Taylor-Condry House	Taylor-Condry House	August 18, 1983 (#83003252)	1700 Taylor Ave. 38°54′48″N 79°51′28″W	Elkins	
35	Tygart Valley Homesteads Historic District	Tygart Valley Homesteads Historic District	July 22, 2004 (#04000304)	Roughly bounded by U.S. Routes 219/250 and County Roads 21 and 38; 38°46′37″N 79°54′25″W	Dailey	
36	Tygarts Valley Church	Tygarts Valley Church	April 15, 1986 (#86000797)	U.S. Route 219; 38°43′02″N 79°58′41″W	Huttonsville	
37	Warfield-Dye Residence	Warfield-Dye Residence	November 13, 1997 (#97001412)	318 Buffalo St. 38°55′42″N 79°50′42″W	Elkins	
38	Wees Historic District	Wees Historic District	March 24, 2006 (#06000164)	Generally bounded by Randolph and S. Randolph Aves., Sycamore St., Diamond St. and Boundary and Terrace Aves. 38°55′39″N 79°50′33″W	Elkins	
39	West Virginia Children's Home	West Virginia Children's Home	November 4, 1994 (#94001287)	230 Heavener Ave. 38°55′58″N 79°51′29″W	Elkins	

== Former listings ==
	Name on the Register	Image	Date listed	Date removed	Location	City or town	Description
1	Elkins Round Barn		July 9, 1985 (#85001547)	December 17, 1990	US 219	Elkins	

== See also ==
- List of National Historic Landmarks in West Virginia
- National Register of Historic Places listings in West Virginia
