= Wees Historic District =

Historic district in West Virginia, United States

- U.S. National Register of Historic Places
- U.S. Historic district
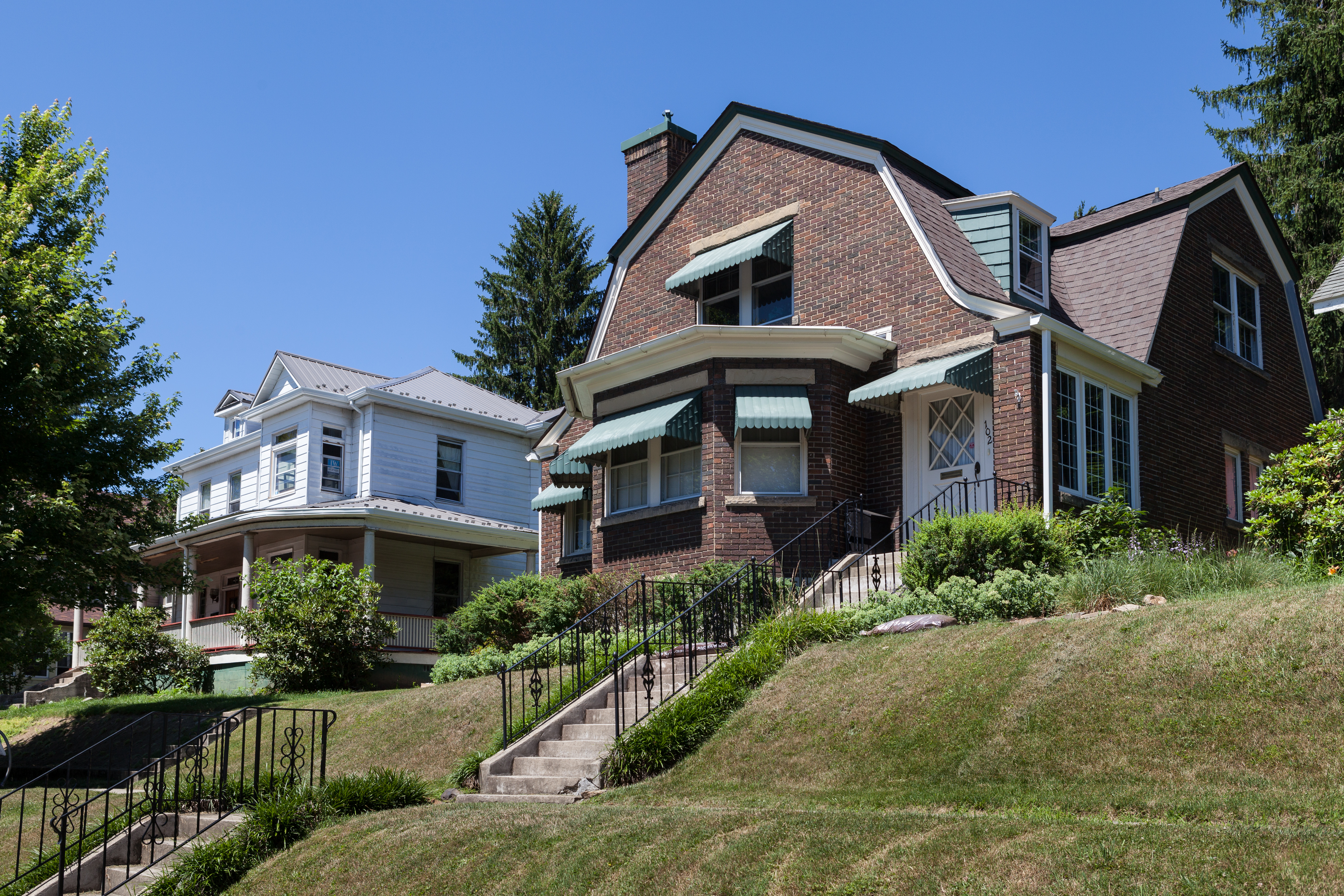
- Two contributing houses at 102 and 106 Boundary Ave, July 2014

- Location within West Virginia Location within the United States
- Location: Generally bounded by Randolph and S. Randolph Aves., Sycamore St., Diamond St. and Boundary and Terrace Aves., Elkins, West Virginia
- Coordinates: 38°55′39″N 79°50′33″W
- Area: 80 acres (32 ha)
- Built: 1890
- Architect: Cassell, Charles E.; et al.
- Architectural style: Late 19th And 20th Century Revivals, Late Victorian
- NRHP reference No.: 06000164
- Added to NRHP: March 24, 2006

Wees Historic District is a national historic district located at Elkins, Randolph County, West Virginia. It encompasses 282 contributing buildings, 1 contributing site, and 1 contributing object in a primarily residential section of Elkins. The district includes houses representative of popular architectural styles between about 1890 and 1955. The district also includes a variety of domestic dependencies, several historic churches, the 7.9-acre City Park, a Works Progress Administration-era public building, and a small number of commercial buildings. Also in the district is a bronze equestrian statue of Henry Gassaway Davis. Located in the district are the previously listed Davis Memorial Presbyterian Church, Randolph County Courthouse and Jail, and the Warfield-Dye Residence.

It was listed on the National Register of Historic Places in 2006.
