= Wymer =

Wymer may refer to:

- Beth Wymer (born 1972), American gymnast
- John Wymer (1928–2006), British archeologist
- John Wymer (1933–2005), Australian rules footballer
- Wymer, Lewis County, West Virginia, United States, an unincorporated community
- Wymer, Randolph County, West Virginia, an unincorporated community

== See also ==
- Wymeer, Germany, a village
- Wyner
