= Wymer, West Virginia =

Wymer, West Virginia may refer to:

- Wymer, Lewis County, West Virginia, United States, an unincorporated community
- Wymer, Randolph County, West Virginia, an unincorporated community
