= Riverside School =

Riverside School may refer to:

- Riverside School, Barking, United Kingdom
- Riverside School, Goole, Goole, United Kingdom
- Riverside School (Fishers, Indiana), United States
- Riverside School (Elkins, West Virginia), United States, a historic school building
- Riverside School (Zimbabwe), Gweru, Zimbabwe

== See also ==
- Riverside School District (disambiguation)
