= Scott Hill =

Scott Hill may refer to:

- Scott Hill (musician), American rock musician
- Scotti Hill (born 1964), guitarist for American rock band Skid Row
- Scott Hill (rugby league) (born 1977), Australian rugby league footballer
- Petticoat Hill, also known as Scott Hill, a hill that rises above Williamsburg, Massachusetts
- Scott Hill (Elkins, West Virginia), a historic home located near Elkins in Randolph County, West Virginia, United States
- Scott Hill (politician), a Kansas state senator and state representative
