= Maplewood Cemetery (Elkins, West Virginia) =

Cemetery in Elkins, West Virginia, US

- U.S. National Register of Historic Places
- Location within West Virginia Location within the United States
- Location: 301 Mapleview Dr, Elkins, West Virginia 26241
- Coordinates: 38°56′24″N 79°51′4″W
- Built: 1927
- NRHP reference No.: 100010186
- Added to NRHP: 2024

Maplewood Cemetery is a historic burial ground located in Elkins, West Virginia. It is recognized as a significant cultural landmark and is the final resting place of several notable figures who played a vital role in the founding and development of the city.

It was listed on the National Register of Historic Places in 2024.

== Memorials ==
- Henry Gassaway Davis was a prominent industrialist and financier, instrumental in the continued growth of the West Virginia Central and Pittsburgh Railroad. His investments and influence helped spur the economic development of the region. Along with his Republican son-in-law, Stephen Benton Elkins, he co-founded Davis & Elkins College, a liberal arts institution that remains a cornerstone of higher education in Elkins.
- Stephen Benton Elkins served as a captain in a Kansas Militia during the Civil War and held several federal roles, including Attorney General of the Territory of New Mexico (1867) and Delegate to the U.S. Congress from the territory (1873–1877). His contributions to public service and industry left a lasting impact on both West Virginia and the American Southwest.
- Davis Elkins, son of Stephen Benton Elkins, served as Assistant Adjutant General during the Spanish-American War with the 1st Virginia Volunteer Infantry. Following his military service, he built a successful career in railroads, banking, utilities, and coal mining. He was later appointed to the United States Senate as a Republican to fill the vacancy caused by his father’s death.

=== Other notable burials ===
- Thomas B. Davis, former U.S. House of Representatives from West Virginia's 2nd district
- Del Gainer, former MLB first baseman
- Howard Sutherland, former United States Senator

== See also ==
- National Register of Historic Places listings in Randolph County, West Virginia
