= Kump (surname) =

Kump is a surname. Notable people with the surname include:

- Edna Hall Scott Kump (1887–1957), former First Lady of West Virginia
- Ernest J. Kump (1911–1999), American architect, author, and inventor
- Heimo Kump (born 1968), Austrian football manager and former player
- Herman G. Kump (1877–1962), American politician
- Jaren Kump (born 2000), American football player
- Larry Kump (1948–2026), American politician
- Marko Kump (born 1988), Slovenian cyclist
- Peter Kump (1937–1995), American figure in the culinary arts

== See also ==
- Gov. H. Guy Kump House
