= Glady Presbyterian Church and Manse =

Historic church in West Virginia, United States

- U.S. National Register of Historic Places
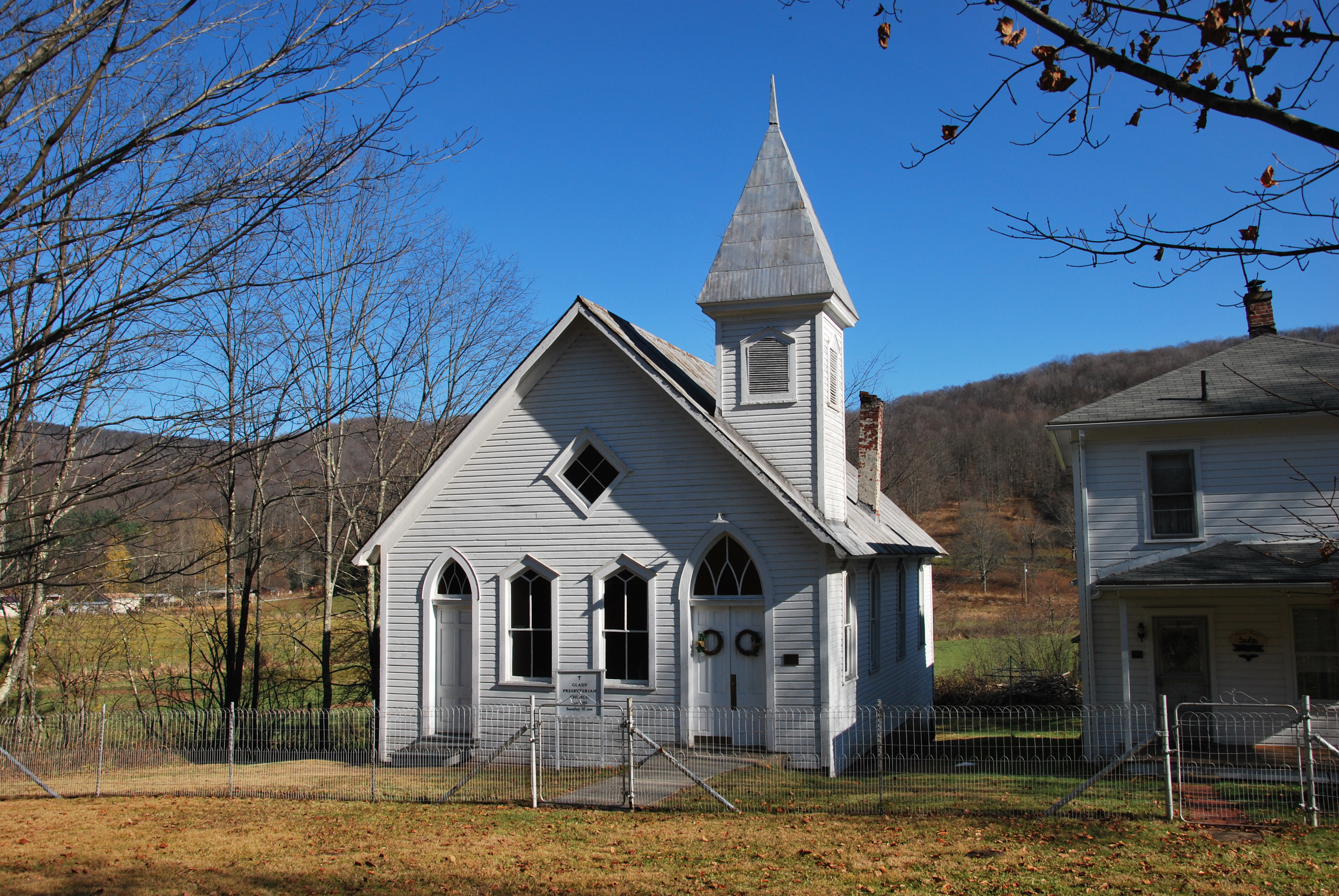
- Glady Presbyterian Church in 2011

- Location within West Virginia Location within the United States
- Location: Jct. of Randolph Ave. and 1st St., Glady, West Virginia
- Coordinates: 38°47′52″N 79°43′10″W
- Area: 0.6 acres (0.24 ha)
- Built: 1905
- Architect: Glady Fork Lumber Company
- Architectural style: Late Gothic Revival
- NRHP reference No.: 05001347
- Added to NRHP: November 30, 2005

Glady Presbyterian Church and Manse is a historic Presbyterian church and parsonage at the junction of Randolph Ave. and 1st Street in Glady, Randolph County, West Virginia. The church was built in 1905, and is a Late Gothic Revival style building. It sits on a stone pier foundation, has wood drop siding and a standing seam metal, front gable roof with exposed, curved rafter ends under the eaves. It features a pyramidal steeple. The manse was built in 1908, and is a simple, two-story, American Foursquare building on a concrete block foundation and a hipped roof. Also on the property is a privy built by the Works Progress Administration about 1935.

It was listed on the National Register of Historic Places in 2005.
