= Elkins-Randolph County Airport =

- IATA: EKN; ICAO: KEKN; FAA LID: EKN

Summary
- Airport type: Public
- Owner: Elkins-Randolph County Regional Airport Authority
- Serves: Elkins, West Virginia
- Elevation AMSL: 1,987.2 ft (605.7 m)
- Coordinates: 38°53′22″N 079°51′25″W
- Website: https://elkinsairport.com
- Interactive map of Elkins-Randolph County Airport

Runways
Direction	Length		Surface
Direction	ft	m	Surface
14/32	4,544	1,385	Asphalt
5/23	4,501	1,372	Asphalt

Statistics (2009)
- Aircraft operations: 14,000
- Based aircraft: 21
- Source: Federal Aviation Administration

Elkins-Randolph County Airport (IATA: EKN, ICAO: KEKN, FAA LID: EKN) is a public-use airport located in Randolph County, West Virginia, 2 mi (3.2 km) from the town of Elkins. The airport lies directly on U.S. Route 219 and U.S. Route 250. The National Plan of Integrated Airport Systems for 2011–2015 categorized it as a general aviation facility. The airport saw a total of 12 enplanements in 2024.

== History ==
The airport opened in the 1930s as a center for passenger mail. In addition, passenger air service initially started by Lake Central Airways operated until 1994, using DC-3 aircraft.

== Facilities ==
The airport is located at an elevation of approximately 1,987 feet (roughly 606 meters). It has two runways: 14/32, which is 4544 x 140 ft. (1385 x 43 m), and 5/23, which is 4501 x 75 ft. (1372 x 23 m). The airport has no control tower.
