= See-Ward House =

Historic house in West Virginia, United States

- U.S. National Register of Historic Places
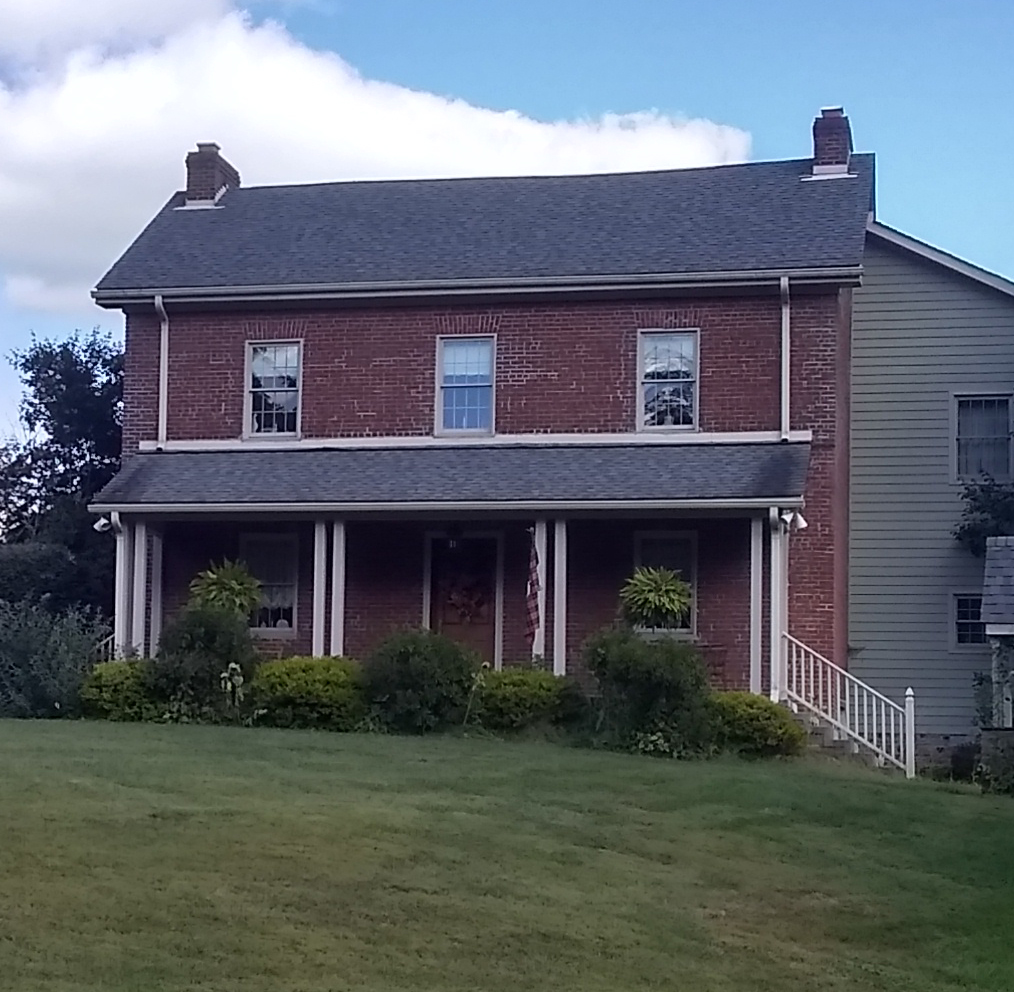

- Location within West Virginia Location within the United States
- Location: U.S. Routes 219/250, near Mill Creek, West Virginia
- Coordinates: 38°43′31″N 79°58′22″W
- Area: 3 acres (1.2 ha)
- Built: 1801
- Architect: Thomas Bradley
- Architectural style: Federal, Adamesque
- NRHP reference No.: 88000671
- Added to NRHP: August 25, 1988

See-Ward House, also known as The Old Brick House, is a historic home located near Mill Creek, Randolph County, West Virginia. It is a two-story, brick I house with a gable roof in the Federal style. The house dates to 1801. Also on the property are a contributing shed, well, and barn site.

It was listed on the National Register of Historic Places in 1988.
