= Baldwin-Chandlee Supply Company-Valley Supply Company =

- U.S. National Register of Historic Places
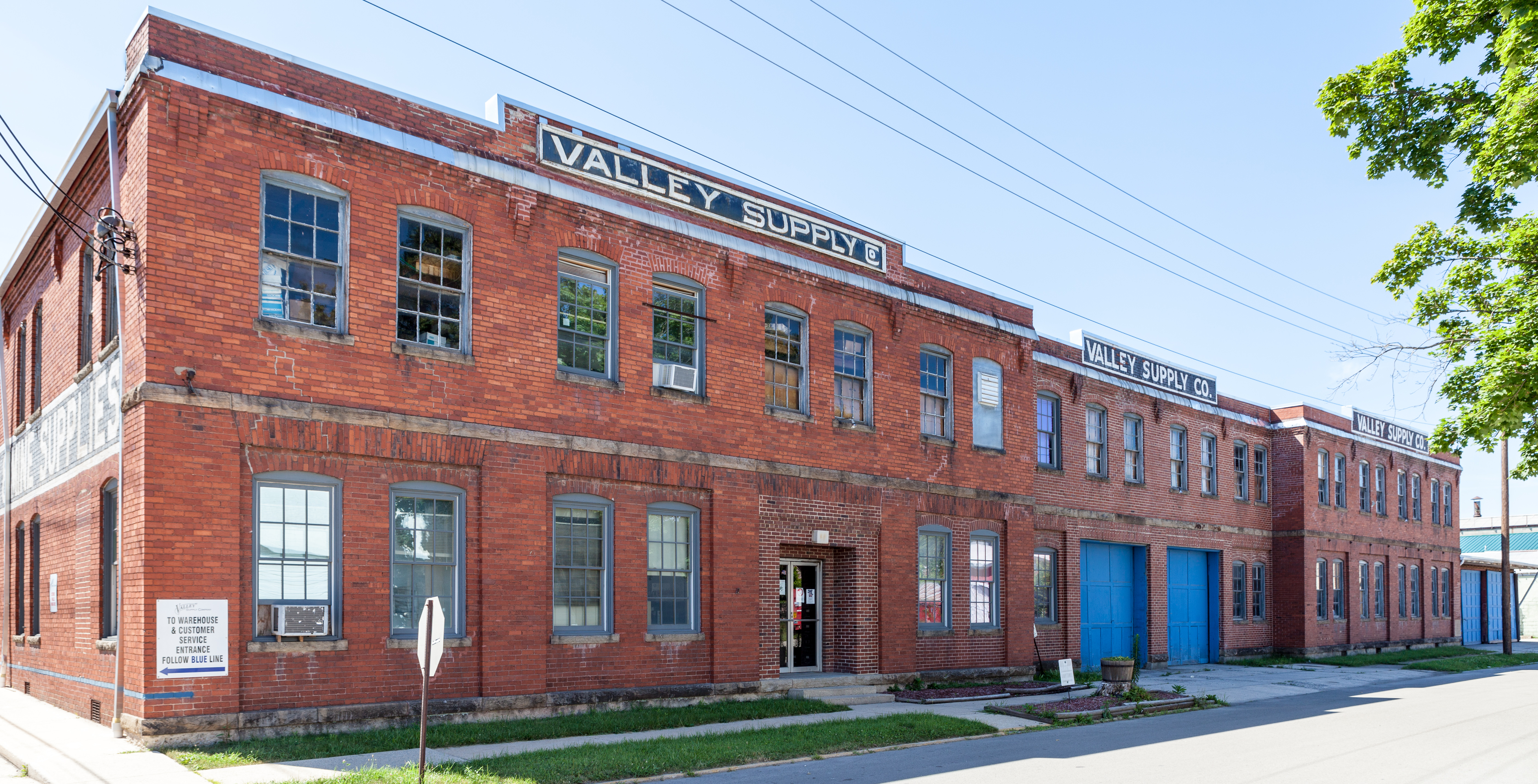
- The east side of the building, seen from the intersection of South Railroad Avenue and 11th Street in July 2014

- Location within West Virginia Location within the United States
- Location: Jct. of 11th and Railroad Sts., Elkins, West Virginia
- Coordinates: 38°55′18″N 79°51′14″W
- Area: 1 acre (0.40 ha)
- Built: 1905, 1923, 1947
- Built by: T.E. Whiteman (1923 addition)
- Architectural style: Early Commercial
- NRHP reference No.: 98001478
- Added to NRHP: December 4, 1998

Baldwin-Chandlee Supply Company-Valley Supply Company is a historic commercial building located at Elkins, Randolph County, West Virginia. It is a two-story, twelve bay brick building in three sections. The first section was built in 1905; the second, and center, section, was built in 1923; the third section was built about 1947.

It was listed on the National Register of Historic Places in 1998.
