= Dr. John C. Irons House =

Historic house in West Virginia, United States

- U.S. National Register of Historic Places
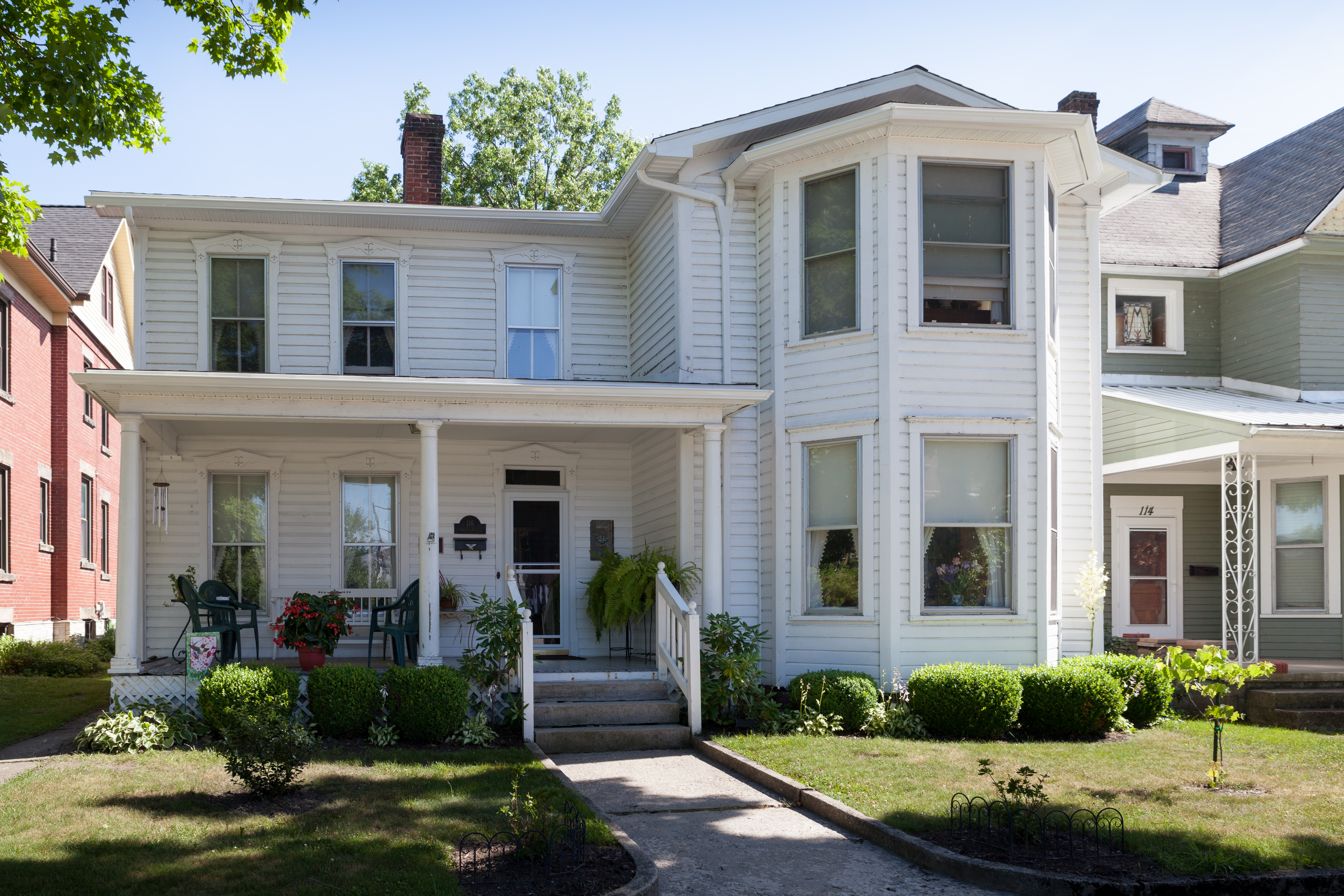
- From Seconds Street, July 2014

- Location within West Virginia Location within the United States
- Location: 116 Second St., Elkins, West Virginia
- Coordinates: 38°55′25″N 79°50′58″W
- Area: less than one acre
- Built: 1889
- Architectural style: Italianate
- NRHP reference No.: 98001479
- Added to NRHP: December 15, 1998

Dr. John C. Irons House, also known as the Dr. S. G. Moore Home, is a historic home located at Elkins, Randolph County, West Virginia. It was built in 1889, and is a two-story Italianate frame dwelling with drop wood siding, a brick foundation and a "T"-shape plan with rear one-story addition. It has a low pitched gable end to the side with a two-story projecting angled bay added about 1911.

It was listed on the National Register of Historic Places in 1998.
