= Fred A. Perley House =

Historic house in West Virginia, United States

- U.S. National Register of Historic Places
- U.S. Historic district
- Nearest city: Jenningston, West Virginia
- Area: 4.3 acres (1.7 ha)
- Built: 1907
- Built by: Perley, Fred A.
- Architectural style: Rustic
- NRHP reference No.: 88001453
- Added to NRHP: September 14, 1988

The Fred A. Perley House is a historic house located in Jenningston, West Virginia. Fred A. Perley, one of the founders of Perley & Crockett Lumber Company, built the house circa 1907. Perley, who was trained as an engineer, designed the house and oversaw its construction. The house has a rustic design with hemlock bark siding, a style which was most likely chosen to resemble Adirondack buildings. The home site also includes a chicken coop, which is considered a contributing building, and the remains of a barn and generator house, both of which are non-contributing. Perley sold the house in 1913 when his company's headquarters moved to North Carolina; after passing through two other owners, it became a summer home for the Laurel River Club in 1925. Due to a 1985 flood, the house is the only surviving building from Perley & Crockett's operations in Jenningston.

The house was added to the National Register of Historic Places on September 14, 1988. The house's address is restricted in its National Register listing; this is generally done to protect sensitive locations from damage.
