= Warfield-Dye Residence =

Historic house in West Virginia, United States

- U.S. National Register of Historic Places
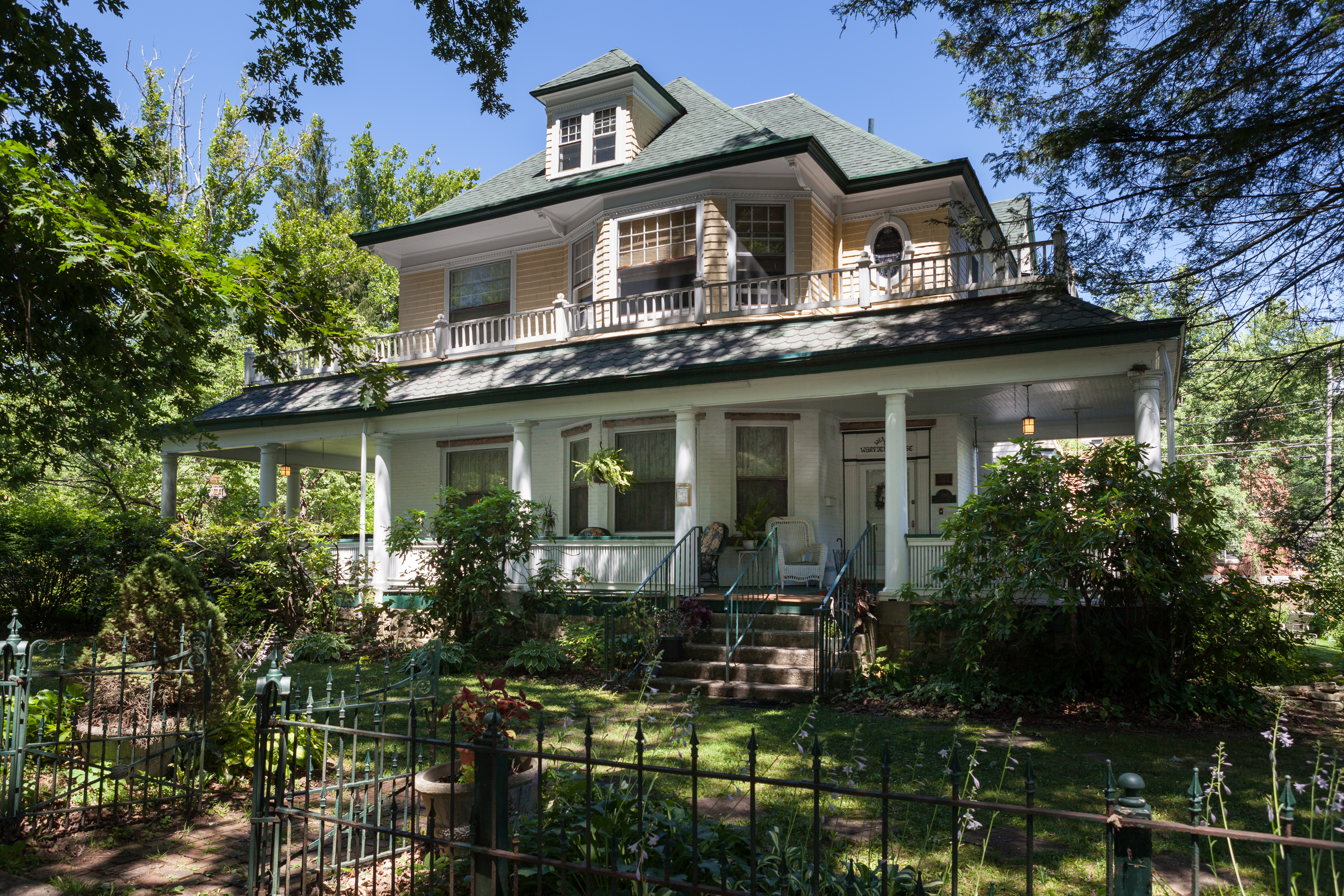
- Looking east from Buffalo St, July 2014

- Location within West Virginia Location within the United States
- Location: 318 Buffalo St., Elkins, West Virginia
- Coordinates: 38°55′42″N 79°50′42″W
- Area: less than one acre
- Built: 1900
- Architectural style: Queen Anne
- NRHP reference No.: 97001412
- Added to NRHP: November 13, 1997

Warfield-Dye Residence, also known as "Wayside," or "Warfield House," is a historic home located at Elkins, Randolph County, West Virginia, United States. It was built in 1900–1901, and is a large 2 1/2-story brick-and-wood-shingle dwelling in the Queen Anne style. It is topped by a hipped roof with dormers and two-story bay. It features a large wraparound porch with wooden rail, Tuscan order column supports, and a balustrade along the roof edge. The house was built by Harry R. Warfield, son-in-law of Senator Henry G. Davis across from "Graceland".

It was listed on the National Register of Historic Places in 1997.
