= Taylor-Condry House =

Historic house in West Virginia, United States

- U.S. National Register of Historic Places
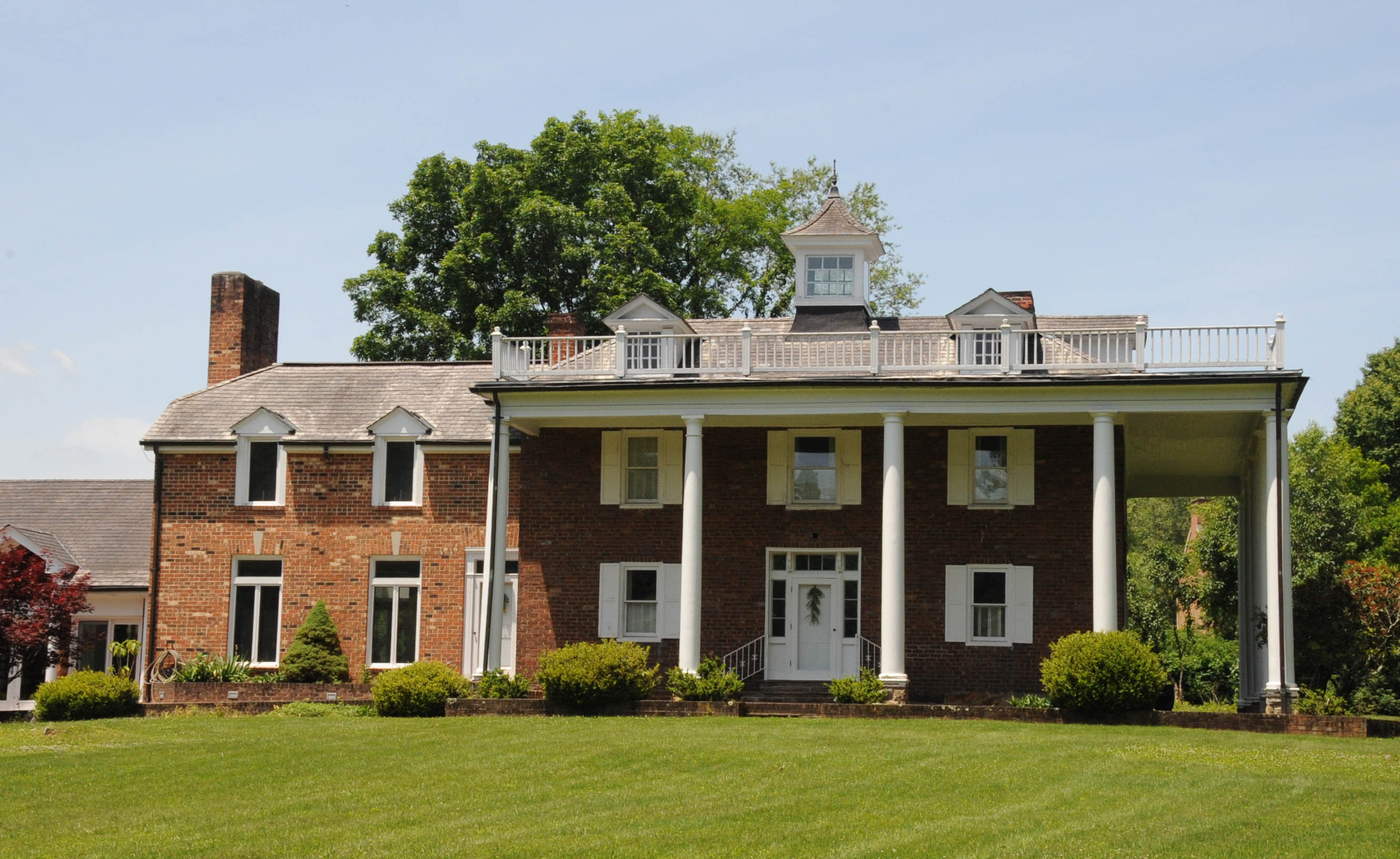

- Location within West Virginia Location within the United States
- Location: 1700 Taylor Av., Elkins, West Virginia
- Coordinates: 38°54′30″N 79°51′6″W
- Area: 2 acres (0.81 ha)
- Architectural style: Colonial Revival
- NRHP reference No.: 83003252
- Added to NRHP: August 18, 1983

Taylor-Condry House, also known as "Ednalea," is a historic home located at Elkins, Randolph County, West Virginia. It was built in 1880–1881, on the site of an 1820s structure. It is a two-story masonry building on a stone foundation in the Colonial Revival style. It is based upon the design of Washington's "Mount Vernon," and has a red asphalt shingle hipped roof with four gabled dormers and topped by a cupola. It features a full, two story columned portico that extends along the full facade of both the front and north side elevation and includes nine Tuscan order columns.

It was listed on the National Register of Historic Places in 1983.
