= Doug Van Gundy =

American writer, poet and musician

- Born: March 12, 1966 (age 60); Lewistown, Pennsylvania, U.S.
- Occupations: Poet; teacher; writer
- Notable work: A Life Above Water (2007)

Doug Van Gundy (born 12 March 1966 in Elkins, West Virginia) is an American poet, writer and teacher. He is known for his poetry collection A Life Above Water, which was published by Red Hen Press in 2007.

In August 1999, Van Gundy was a contestant of ABC's Who Wants to be a Millionaire, and became the first contestant to win $250,000 on the show.

== Early life and education ==
Van Gundy is a graduate of Goddard College, where he received his degree as a Master of Fine Arts. Doug has been a visiting poet at Middle Tennessee State University, Lynchburg College, Randolph Macon College, Barton College, Coastal Carolina University, and Davis & Elkins College. He was an associate artist at the Atlantic Center for the Arts in New Smyrna Beach, Florida. His music has also been featured on National Public Radio's Mountain Stage.

== Career ==
Gundy has written poetry and essays appearing in the Oxford American, The Guardian, Ecotone, Poems & Plays and The Louisville Review. He is the co-editor of Eyes Glowing at the Edge of the Woods: Contemporary Writing from West Virginia, published by Vandalia Press.

== Selected publications ==
=== Collections ===
- A Life Above Water: Poems (Red Hen Press, 2007) ISBN 9781597094313
- Eyes Glowing at the Edge of the Woods: Fiction and Poetry (West Virginia University Press, 2017) ISBN 9781943665563

=== Prose/ poetry ===
- When the Rain Came
- A fierce desire to stay: looking at West Virginia through its people's eyes
