= Tygarts Valley High School =

Tygarts Valley Middle/High School

Location
- Rts. 219/250 South; Mill Creek, West Virginia 26280; United States; 38.726448°N 79.972008°W

Information
- School type: Public secondary school
- Established: 1923
- School district: Randolph County Schools
- CEEB code: 490825
- Principal: Steve Wamsley
- Teaching staff: 32.00 (FTE)
- Grades: 6-12
- Gender: Coed
- Enrollment: 401 (2023–2024)
- Average class size: 16.9 (as of 2005-06)
- Student to teacher ratio: 12.53
- Campus type: Rural
- Colors: Red and white
- Athletics: WVSSAC A
- Mascot: Bulldog
- Yearbook: Bulldog
- Website: https://tvmhs.rand.k12.wv.us/o/tvmhs

Tygarts Valley Middle/High School is a public secondary school in Mill Creek, West Virginia. Established in 1923, the school serves students in grades 6 through 12.

== History ==
Tygarts Valley High School opened in 1923, succeeding the former Huttonsville District High School. Its first graduating class was in 1924. A gymnasium and extra classrooms were added to the school in 1950. Basketball, which had been played at the school since 1924, was joined by baseball and football teams in 1971. Also during the 1970s, an annex was built behind the gym and an 8 classroom junior high section was added. The original section of the school was replaced in 2001.

== Former Principals ==
- Frank Toothman (1977-1978)
- Hans Siertl (1979-1984)
- Wilbert Smith (1985-2007)
- Steve Wamsley (2008–present day)

== Curriculum ==
The school offers a comprehensive curriculum. Advanced Placement course offerings were recently introduced at the school.

== Extracurricular activities ==
The school's athletic teams, known as the Tygarts Valley Bulldogs, compete in West Virginia Secondary School Activities Commission class A. Teams are fielded in baseball, basketball, cheerleading, football, golf, softball, track and volleyball. The teams have won many sectional championships, particularly the basketball teams.

In fall 2011, the high school marching band won first place in their division at the Tournament of Bands Chapter 13 Championships and qualified to attend the Atlantic Coast Championships to compete against high schools from across the eastern seaboard.

State championship titles held by the school include:

- Baseball: 1978 (AA), 1979 (AA)
