= Elkins Milling Company =

- U.S. National Register of Historic Places
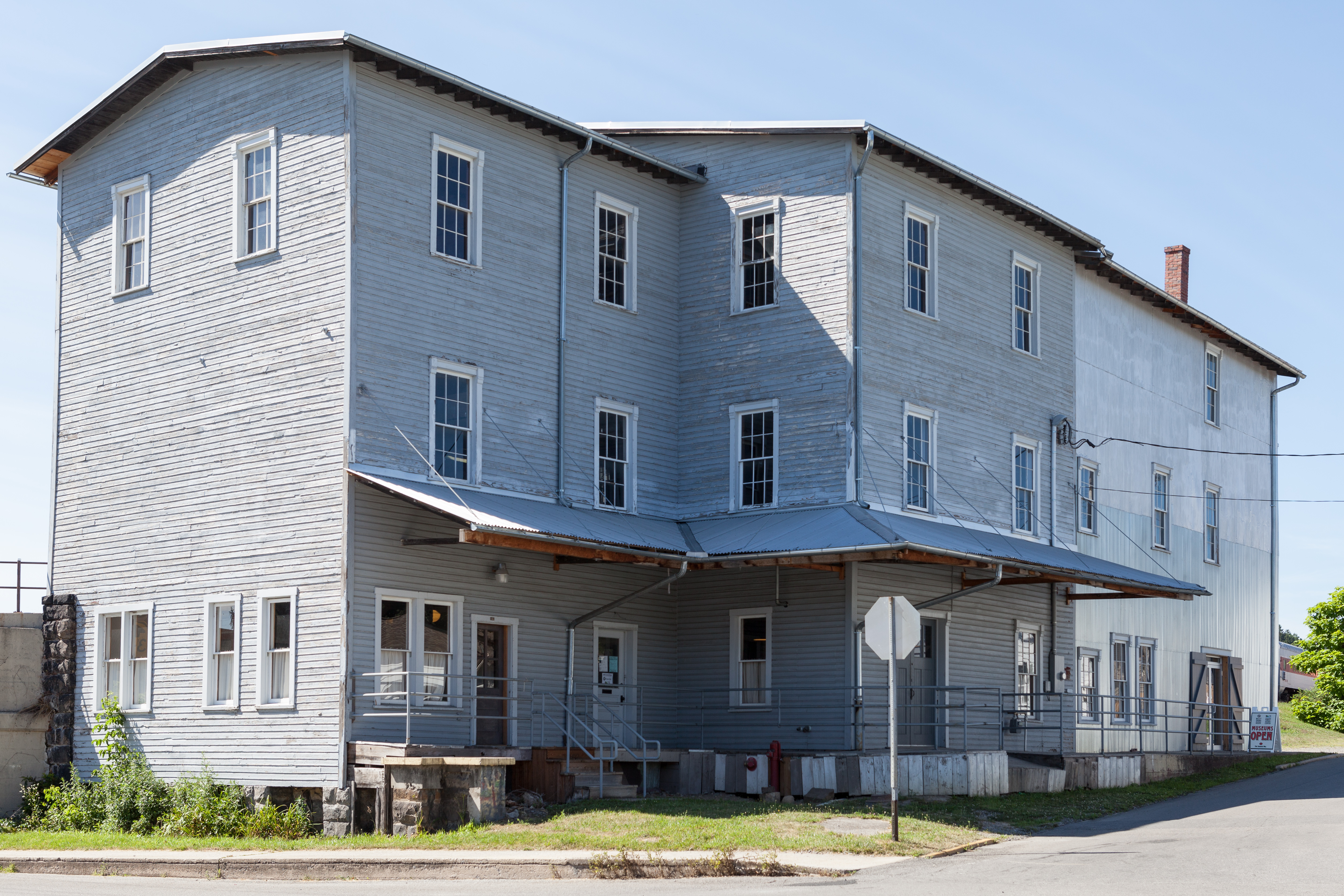
- Looking northwest from the corner of 1st and Railroad Streets, July 2014

- Location within West Virginia Location within the United States
- Location: 2 1/2 Railroad Ave., Elkins, West Virginia
- Coordinates: 38°55′23″N 79°51′5″W
- Area: less than one acre
- Built: 1902
- Architectural style: Roller Mill
- NRHP reference No.: 04001595
- Added to NRHP: February 2, 2005

Elkins Milling Company, also known as Darden's Mill, is a historic grist mill located at Elkins, Randolph County, West Virginia. It is a three-story timber frame structure, eight bays long and three bays deep. It was built in 1902, and expanded and at various points in the 20th century. The building served Elkins and the surrounding area as a merchant grain mill and feed store. Now, it is the location of the Appalachian Forest Discovery Center, a museum and educational hub operated by the Appalachian Forest National Heritage Area, and the West Virginia Railroad Museum.

It was listed on the National Register of Historic Places in 2005.

== Current use ==
=== Appalachian Forest Discovery Center ===
Since the early 2000s, the Darden Mill has housed the Appalachian Forest Discovery Center, a museum focused on the natural, cultural, and industrial heritage of the region. It also functions as a community gathering space and event venue.
