= Jae Spears =

American politician (1923–2013)

Ursula Jae (Marshall) Spears (January 5, 1923 – March 16, 2013) was an American politician. Spears served in the West Virginia House of Delegates 1974–1980 and then the West Virginia State Senate 1980–1992. She was the first woman to serve as Senate Majority Whip and the first and only, female to chair the powerful Senate Finance Committee. Spears pioneered the participation of women in the legislative process. Elected in 1974 as one of only eight women to the 100-member House of Delegates, she saw, during her 18 years of service, the female membership of that body grow to nearly 25 percent.

== Life ==
Speaks was born in Latonia, Kentucky to James and Sylvia Fox Marshall. She graduated from Covington High School and attended the University of Kentucky.

In 1980, Spears was elected as one of only two women to the 34-member West Virginia State Senate. Two years later, she was appointed Senate Majority Whip, becoming the first woman to hold a leadership position in either House. As Senate Finance Chairman in 1984–1986, she became the first and only woman to head the committee that puts together the budget for the state. She was also the first woman to sit on the Joint Committee on Government and Finance.

Particularly active in the health-care field, Spears sponsored and saw enacted into law the first home health-care bill and the first bills that provided help for hemophiliacs and for autistic children. She served for many years on the Statewide Health Coordinating Council and was part of the steering committee which established the Hampshire County Retardation Center. She was one of three senators who wrote the bill authorizing the Rural Health Initiative. She served for a number of years as a member of the Visiting Committee (Advisory Board) for West Virginia University's College of Medicine.

A strong advocate for protection of the family farm, Spears served 14 years on the West Virginia University Visiting Committee for Extension and Continuing Education. Active in promoting literacy for all West Virginians, Spears served several terms on the state board of directors for the West Virginia Branch, Literacy Volunteers of America, and was state president for two terms. She was a member from its inception of the Governor's Literacy Council.

As a member of the Advisory Council for WNPB-TV, Morgantown, Spears became its chair for two years. She served as a member of the Advisory Commission of the Governor's Task Force for Children and on the Advisory Board for the West Virginia Women's Commission. Senator Spears also served for many years on the state board of directors for the West Virginia Foundation for Independent Colleges. She was recognized for her contributions and support to Glenville State College when that college named their board room in her honor.

An ardent advocate for veterans and the National Guard, Spears’ bill for employing and training veterans – the first such legislation in the nation – brought her a national award from the U.S. Department of Labor and Veterans Affairs. She was the first legislator to receive the state Veterans Council award, and was named an honorary brigadier general in the West Virginia National Guard. She served for a number of years on the executive board for the West Virginia Employers Support Group for the Guard and Reserve.

Spears was honored by the governor of North Carolina with an environmental award for her work in protecting the West Virginia portion of the New River. She received awards from the Professional Educators Association and the West Virginia Association of Retired School Employees. She was named woman of the year by the National League of American Pen Women and by the Elkins Branch of the B.P.W. She received the Susan B. Anthony Award from the state organization of N.O.W.

After she finished serving in the West Virginia Senate, Spears was appointed to the state Judicial Hearing Board.

Spears died in Elkins, West Virginia Saturday March 16, 2013, at her home. West Virginia Gov. Earl Ray Tomblin ordered all state flags to be flown at half-staff from dawn to dusk to respect and honor Spears.
