= Downtown Elkins Historic District =

Historic district in West Virginia, United States

- U.S. National Register of Historic Places
- U.S. Historic district
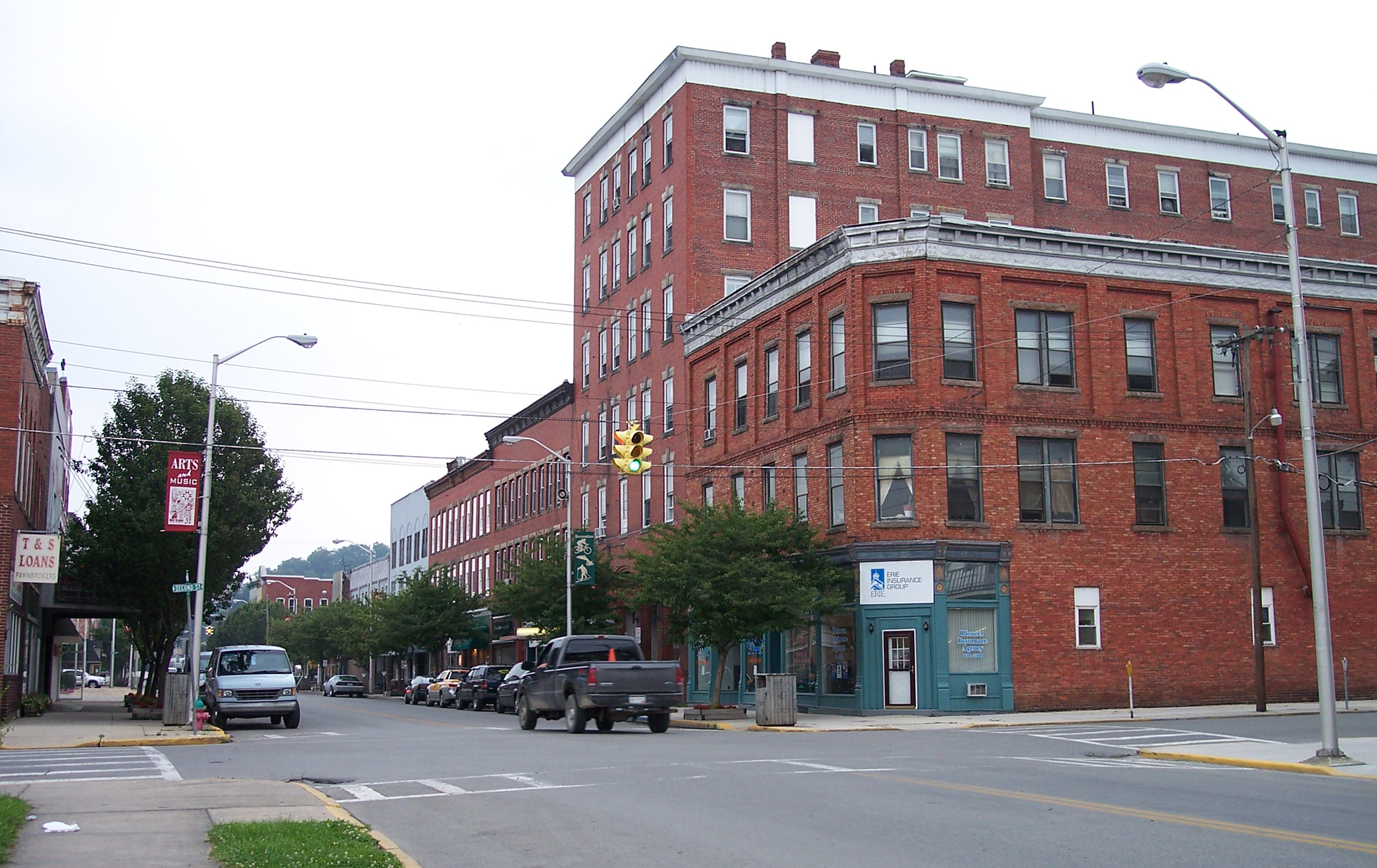
- Davis Avenue, July 2006

- Location within West Virginia Location within the United States
- Location: Roughly bounded by Railroad Ave., Fifth St., Randolph Ave., Henry Ave. and First St., Elkins, West Virginia
- Coordinates: 38°55′28″N 79°50′57″W
- Area: 28 acres (11 ha)
- Built: 1893
- Built by: Multiple, including Ray W. Bishop, James Cain, Edward T. McHale, Charles McLaughlin, Henry Ray, Elijah Triplett, John T. Ward, Thorton R. Whiteman (Note: several listed as builders are actually architects and builders)
- Architect: Multiple, including Eugene D. Liller, Charles T. Mott
- Architectural style: Italianate, Late 19th And Early 20th Century American Movements, Classical Revival
- NRHP reference No.: 95001324
- Added to NRHP: November 22, 1995

Downtown Elkins Historic District is a national historic district located at Elkins, Randolph County, West Virginia. It encompasses 65 contributing buildings in the central business district of Elkins. It includes mostly commercial buildings constructed in the late-19th and early-20th century. Notable buildings include the Dann Building (1897), Randolph Company (1896), Randolph Hotel (1893), Wallace Bakery (1895), railroad depot (1908), Ward Building (1908), First United Methodist Church (1904), Hotel Delmonte (1899), Darden Block (1906), Brown Building (1906), Stalnaker Block (1900), and Post Office and Federal Building (now City Hall, 1917).

It was listed on the National Register of Historic Places in 1995.
