= Middle Mountain Cabins =

Historic houses in West Virginia, United States

- U.S. National Register of Historic Places
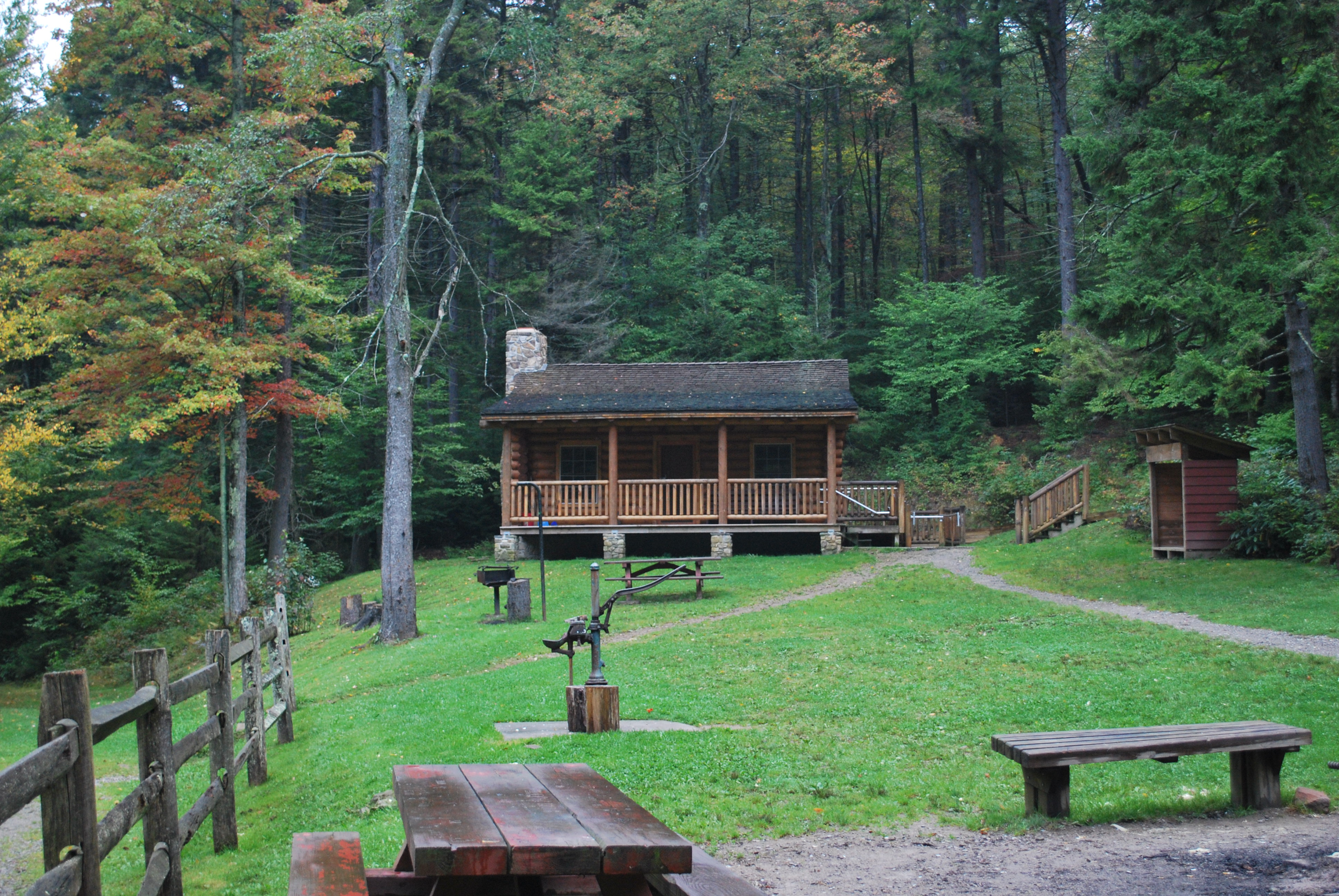
- Main Cabin in 2008

- Location within West Virginia Location within the United States
- Nearest city: Eastern side of Middle Mountain Rd. at Camp Five Run, Monongahela National Forest, near Wymer, West Virginia
- Coordinates: 38°41′18″N 79°44′3″W
- Area: 3.2 acres (1.3 ha)
- Built: 1931
- Built by: Donald R. Gaudineer
- Architectural style: Rustic
- NRHP reference No.: 90001447
- Added to NRHP: September 27, 1990

Middle Mountain Cabins are a set of three historic cabins located in the Monongahela National Forest near Wymer, Randolph County, West Virginia. They were built in 1931, and consist of the Main Cabin and Cabins 1 and 2. The Main Cabin is a one-story, rectangular, stained log building measuring approximately 22 feet by 20 feet. It has a gable roof and full-length porch. Cabins 1 and 2 are mirror-images of each other. They are one-story, frame buildings with gable roofs measuring approximately 25 feet by 14 feet. They were built to provide quarters for fire lookouts and to serve as a base for conducting other Forest Service operations. They have since been converted for recreational use, and are available for rental as a group.

It was listed on the National Register of Historic Places in 1990.
