= West Virginia Children's Home =

- U.S. National Register of Historic Places
- U.S. Historic district
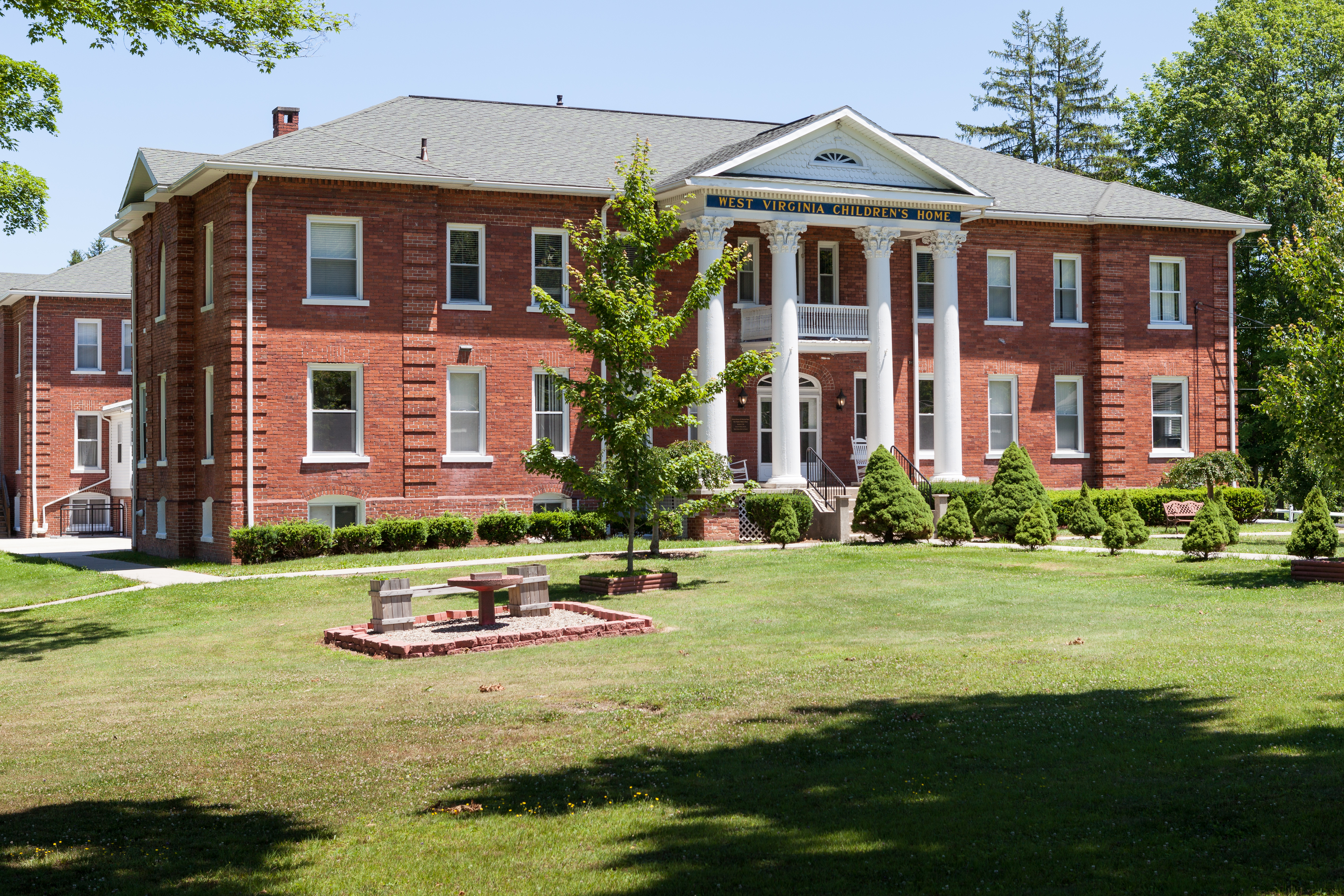
- Looking north from Heavener Ave, July 2014

- Location within West Virginia Location within the United States
- Location: 230 Heavener Ave., Elkins, West Virginia
- Coordinates: 38°55′58″N 79°51′29″W
- Area: 18.1 acres (7.3 ha)
- Built: 1910
- Architect: Holmboe & Lafferty
- Architectural style: Colonial Revival
- NRHP reference No.: 94001287
- Added to NRHP: November 4, 1994

West Virginia Children's Home is a national historic district located at Elkins, Randolph County, West Virginia. It encompasses two contributing buildings and two contributing structures. The original Children's Home building was built in 1909, with a main section and rear ell in the Colonial Revival style. An upper story to the ell was added by 1918, and an addition was built in 1935. The front facade features a portico with Corinthian order columns. The other contributing building is a two-story residence built in 1920. The contributing structures are the swimming pool (1935) and a brick storage cellar. It served as the statewide institution for the housing and placement of orphaned, neglected, and dependent children from 1911 until 1977. It was subsequently occupied by a residential treatment facility for disturbed teenagers.

It was listed on the National Register of Historic Places in 1994.
