= Glady, West Virginia =

Unincorporated community in West Virginia, United States

- Unincorporated community
- Location within West Virginia Location within the United States
- Coordinates: 38°47′54″N 79°43′10″W
- Country: United States
- State: West Virginia
- County: Randolph
- Elevation: 2,861 ft (872 m)
- Time zone: UTC-5 (Eastern (EST))
  - Summer (DST): UTC-4 (EDT)
- ZIP code: 26268
- Area codes: 304 & 681
- GNIS feature ID: 1551244

Glady is an unincorporated community in Randolph County, West Virginia, United States. Glady is 11 miles (18 km) southeast of Elkins. Glady had a post office, which closed on May 14, 2011.

The community was named for the glades along the Glady Fork River, near the original town site.

== Climate ==
The climate in this area has mild differences between highs and lows, and there is adequate rainfall year-round. According to the Köppen Climate Classification system, Glady has a marine west coast climate, abbreviated "Cfb" on climate maps.

Climate data for Glady, West Virginia, 1991–2020 normals, extremes 1975–2015
| Month | Jan | Feb | Mar | Apr | May | Jun | Jul | Aug | Sep | Oct | Nov | Dec | Year |
|---|---|---|---|---|---|---|---|---|---|---|---|---|---|
| Record high °F (°C) | 66 (19) | 72 (22) | 80 (27) | 85 (29) | 88 (31) | 90 (32) | 96 (36) | 90 (32) | 91 (33) | 81 (27) | 78 (26) | 72 (22) | 96 (36) |
| Mean maximum °F (°C) | 58.3 (14.6) | 60.2 (15.7) | 70.5 (21.4) | 77.5 (25.3) | 81.8 (27.7) | 84.2 (29.0) | 85.5 (29.7) | 85.8 (29.9) | 82.1 (27.8) | 76.6 (24.8) | 69.7 (20.9) | 59.4 (15.2) | 87.2 (30.7) |
| Mean daily maximum °F (°C) | 35.1 (1.7) | 38.5 (3.6) | 46.7 (8.2) | 59.0 (15.0) | 67.6 (19.8) | 74.6 (23.7) | 77.9 (25.5) | 77.2 (25.1) | 72.1 (22.3) | 61.3 (16.3) | 49.3 (9.6) | 39.3 (4.1) | 58.2 (14.6) |
| Daily mean °F (°C) | 25.4 (−3.7) | 27.8 (−2.3) | 35.2 (1.8) | 46.2 (7.9) | 55.1 (12.8) | 62.7 (17.1) | 66.4 (19.1) | 65.5 (18.6) | 59.3 (15.2) | 48.3 (9.1) | 37.6 (3.1) | 29.9 (−1.2) | 46.6 (8.1) |
| Mean daily minimum °F (°C) | 15.7 (−9.1) | 17.2 (−8.2) | 23.8 (−4.6) | 33.4 (0.8) | 42.6 (5.9) | 50.8 (10.4) | 55.0 (12.8) | 53.9 (12.2) | 46.6 (8.1) | 35.3 (1.8) | 26.0 (−3.3) | 20.6 (−6.3) | 35.1 (1.7) |
| Mean minimum °F (°C) | −9.7 (−23.2) | −7.2 (−21.8) | 2.2 (−16.6) | 16.9 (−8.4) | 27.2 (−2.7) | 35.7 (2.1) | 41.7 (5.4) | 41.9 (5.5) | 31.0 (−0.6) | 19.8 (−6.8) | 9.3 (−12.6) | −3.7 (−19.8) | −15.0 (−26.1) |
| Record low °F (°C) | −25 (−32) | −21 (−29) | −14 (−26) | 9 (−13) | 20 (−7) | 26 (−3) | 30 (−1) | 33 (1) | 25 (−4) | 11 (−12) | −3 (−19) | −33 (−36) | −33 (−36) |
| Average precipitation inches (mm) | 4.45 (113) | 3.98 (101) | 4.80 (122) | 5.19 (132) | 6.24 (158) | 5.04 (128) | 5.66 (144) | 4.11 (104) | 4.52 (115) | 3.68 (93) | 3.34 (85) | 4.28 (109) | 55.29 (1,404) |
| Average snowfall inches (cm) | 27.3 (69) | 24.0 (61) | 17.5 (44) | 4.3 (11) | 0.0 (0.0) | 0.0 (0.0) | 0.0 (0.0) | 0.0 (0.0) | 0.0 (0.0) | 1.4 (3.6) | 8.0 (20) | 20.2 (51) | 102.7 (259.6) |
| Average precipitation days (≥ 0.01 in) | 19.4 | 16.2 | 16.2 | 15.1 | 16.0 | 14.3 | 14.9 | 11.9 | 10.4 | 11.0 | 12.9 | 16.9 | 175.2 |
| Average snowy days (≥ 0.1 in) | 11.5 | 9.4 | 6.9 | 2.2 | 0.0 | 0.0 | 0.0 | 0.0 | 0.0 | 0.6 | 3.6 | 8.4 | 42.6 |
Source 1: NOAA
Source 2: National Weather Service (mean maxima/minima 1981–2010)
