= Riverside School District =

Riverside School District may refer to:

- Riverside School District (Arkansas)
- Riverside Elementary School District, in Arizona
- Riverside Unified School District in California
- Riverside Community School District, in Iowa
- Riverside School District (New Jersey)
- Riverside School District (Pennsylvania)
- Riverside School District (Washington)
