= Gov. H. Guy Kump House =

Historic house in West Virginia, United States

- U.S. National Register of Historic Places
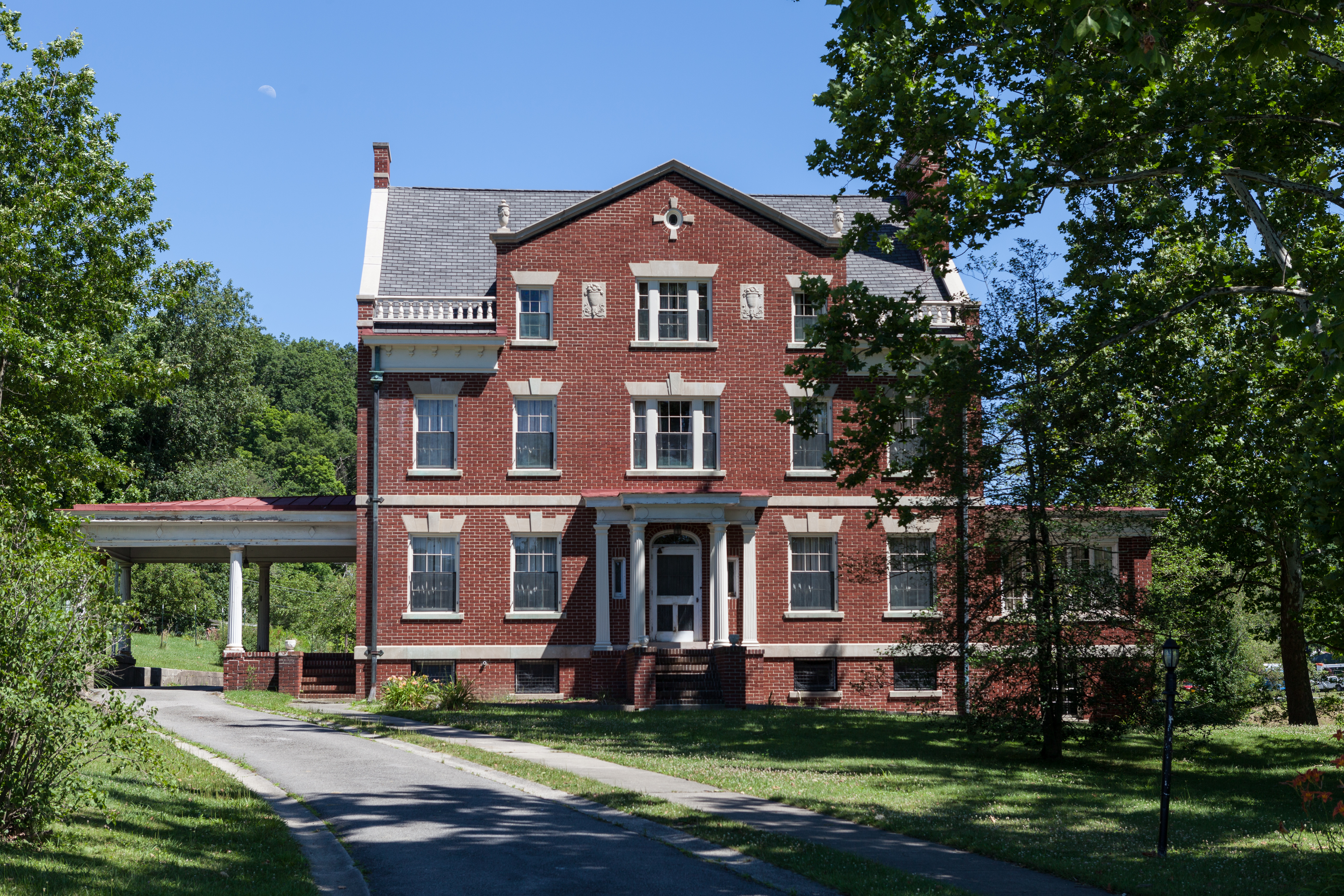
- Looking east from US 219, July 2014

- Location within West Virginia Location within the United States
- Location: US 33 and 250, Elkins, West Virginia
- Coordinates: 38°55′4″N 79°50′33″W
- Area: 3 acres (1.2 ha)
- Built: 1924
- Architect: Clarence L. Harding
- Architectural style: Late 19th And 20th Century Revivals, Colonial Revival, Neo-Federal Revival
- NRHP reference No.: 04000319
- Added to NRHP: August 18, 1983

Gov. H. Guy Kump House is a historic home located at Elkins, Randolph County, West Virginia. It was designed by noted Washington, D.C.-architect Clarence L. Harding and built in 1924–1925, as a home for West Virginia Governor Herman G. Kump (1877–1962) and his wife Edna Hall Scott Kump (1887–1957). It is a 2 1/2-story, 42 foot square, red brick dwelling with a steeply pitched, slate covered gable roof. The front facade features a shallow Doric order entrance portico and it has a porte cochere and sun porch. The house is in a Neo-Federal Revival style with Neo-Georgian Revival elements. In 2008, the house was willed to the city of Elkins.

It was listed on the National Register of Historic Places in 1983.
