= Scott Hill (Elkins, West Virginia) =

Historic house in West Virginia, United States

- U.S. National Register of Historic Places
- U.S. Historic district
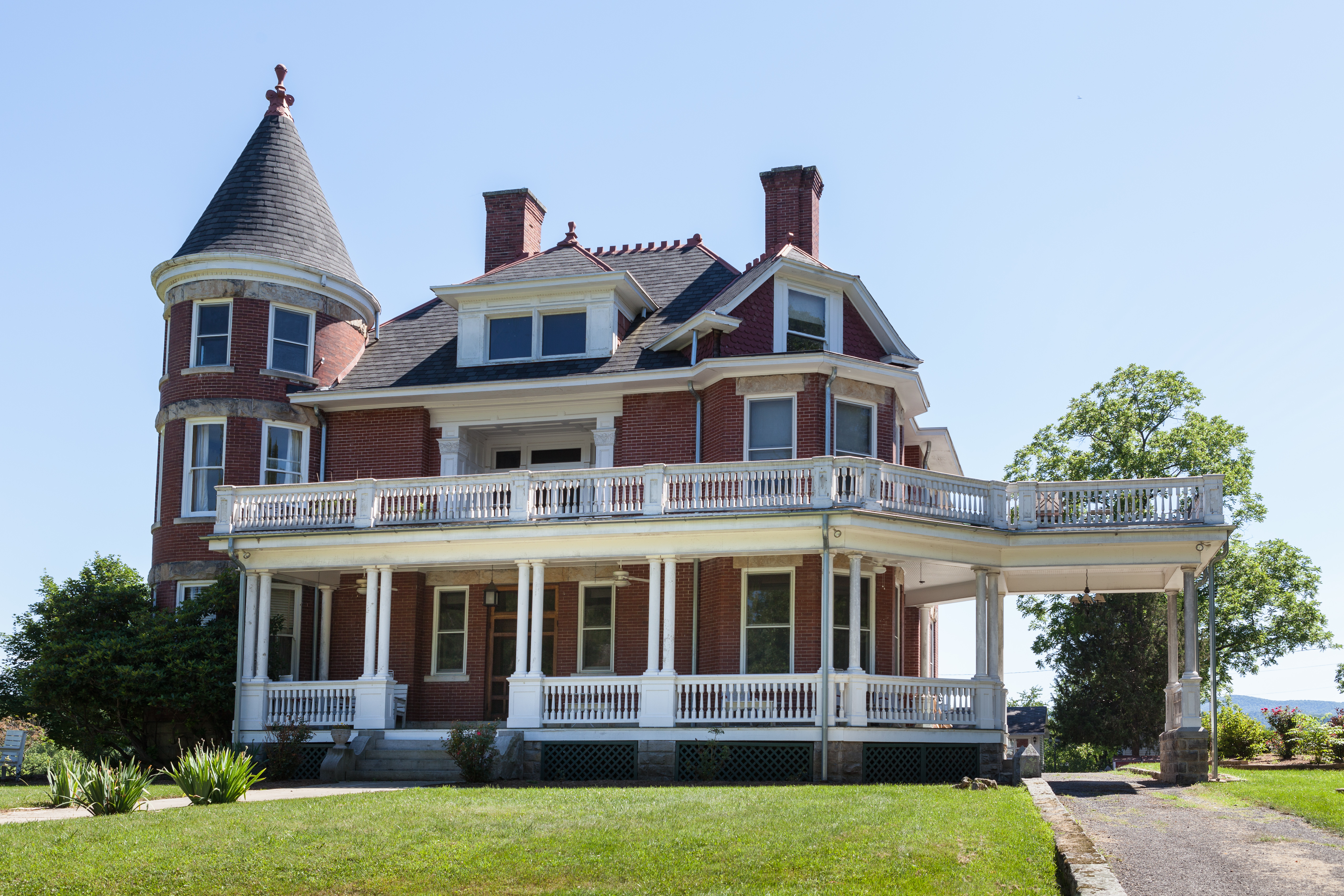
- North side in July 2014

- Location within West Virginia Location within the United States
- Location: 2000 Livingston Ave., Elkins, West Virginia
- Coordinates: 38°54′47.7″N 79°51′39.5″W
- Area: 20 acres (8.1 ha)
- Architectural style: Queen Anne
- NRHP reference No.: 08001240
- Added to NRHP: December 22, 2008

Scott Hill is a historic home located near Elkins in Randolph County, West Virginia, United States. It was built in 1892, and is a 2 ½ story, brick Queen Anne style dwelling on a sandstone foundation. It has an asymmetrical shape with a truncated slate covered hipped roof. The front facade features a large, one-story wraparound porch. It also has a porte cochere supported by two replacement Ionic order columns. Also on the property are a contributing one-story, square-plan frame smoke house (c. 1892), carriage house (c. 1892), chicken coop (c. 1920), corn crib (c. 1892), bank barn (c. 1892), equipment shed (c. 1941), and stone ornamental pond (c. 1910).

It was listed on the National Register of Historic Places in 2008.
