= Mill Creek, West Virginia =

- Town
- Logo

- Location of Mill Creek in Randolph County, West Virginia.
- Coordinates: 38°43′54″N 79°58′20″W
- Country: United States
- State: West Virginia
- County: Randolph

Area
  - Total: 0.46 sq mi (1.18 km^{2})
  - Land: 0.46 sq mi (1.18 km^{2})
  - Water: 0 sq mi (0.00 km^{2})
- Elevation: 2,044 ft (623 m)

Population (2020)
  - Total: 560
  - Estimate (2021): 560
  - Density: 1,513.6/sq mi (584.39/km^{2})
- Time zone: UTC-5 (Eastern (EST))
  - Summer (DST): UTC-4 (EDT)
- ZIP code: 26280
- Area code: 304
- FIPS code: 54-54100
- GNIS feature ID: 1552100
- Website: https://townofmillcreekwv.com/

Mill Creek is a town in Randolph County, West Virginia, United States, along the Tygart Valley River. The population was 563 at the 2020 census.

The town takes its name from nearby Mill Creek.

== Geography ==
Mill Creek is located at 38°43′54″N 79°58′20″W (38.731748, -79.972279).

According to the United States Census Bureau, the town has a total area of 0.46 square miles (1.19 km^{2}), all land.

== Demographics ==
Historical population
Census	Pop.	Note	%±
1910	740		—
1920	762		3.0%
1930	723		−5.1%
1940	732		1.2%
1950	800		9.3%
1960	817		2.1%
1970	800		−2.1%
1980	801		0.1%
1990	685		−14.5%
2000	662		−3.4%
2010	724		9.4%
2020	560		−22.7%
2021 (est.)	560	Steady	0.0%
U.S. Decennial Census

=== 2010 census ===
At the 2010 census there were 724 people, 287 households, and 204 families living in the town. The population density was 1,573.9 inhabitants per square mile (607.7/km^{2}). There were 334 housing units at an average density of 726.1 per square mile (280.3/km^{2}). The racial makeup of the town was 98.5% White, 0.1% African American, 0.1% Native American, 0.1% Asian, and 1.1% from two or more races. Hispanic or Latino of any race were 0.6%.

Of the 287 households 32.1% had children under the age of 18 living with them, 49.1% were married couples living together, 13.9% had a female householder with no husband present, 8.0% had a male householder with no wife present, and 28.9% were non-families. 25.1% of households were one person and 12.2% were one person aged 65 or older. The average household size was 2.52 and the average family size was 2.96.

The median age in the town was 41.5 years. 24.4% of residents were under the age of 18; 5.5% were between the ages of 18 and 24; 24.5% were from 25 to 44; 26.8% were from 45 to 64; and 18.9% were 65 or older. The gender makeup of the town was 48.2% male and 51.8% female.

=== 2000 census ===
At the 2000 census there were 662 people, 282 households, and 190 families living in the town. The population density was 1,476.3 inhabitants per square mile (568.0/km^{2}). There were 325 housing units at an average density of 724.7 per square mile (278.9/km^{2}). The racial makeup of the town was 99.70% White, 0.15% Native American, and 0.15% from two or more races. Hispanic or Latino of any race were 0.60%.

Of the 282 households 24.5% had children under the age of 18 living with them, 48.9% were married couples living together, 13.8% had a female householder with no husband present, and 32.6% were non-families. 27.7% of households were one person and 16.0% were one person aged 65 or older. The average household size was 2.35 and the average family size was 2.83.

The age distribution was 21.1% under the age of 18, 9.2% from 18 to 24, 27.9% from 25 to 44, 23.9% from 45 to 64, and 17.8% 65 or older. The median age was 39 years. For every 100 females, there were 78.4 males. For every 100 females aged 18 and over, there were 79.4 males.

The median household income was $24,886 and the median family income was $27,313. Males had a median income of $22,353 versus $18,333 for females. The per capita income for the town was $11,915. About 12.0% of families and 21.6% of the population were below the poverty line, including 27.6% of those under age 18 and 16.4% of those age 65 or over.

== Education ==
Local schools include Tygarts Valley Middle/High School and George Ward Elementary School.

Mill Creek is in the Randolph County Schools district

Tygarts Valley Middle/High School opened in 1923. Additions such as the gymnasium and the annex were added throughout the 1950s and 1970s. The old section of the school was partially torn down to one story and annexed with a new section in 2001. Tygart Valley High School's colors are red and white, their mascot is the Bulldog.

The next closest high school is Elkins High School in Elkins, West Virginia.

== Notable person ==
- George W. Maher - early 20th century Prairie School style architect
