= Albert and Liberal Arts Halls =

- U.S. National Register of Historic Places
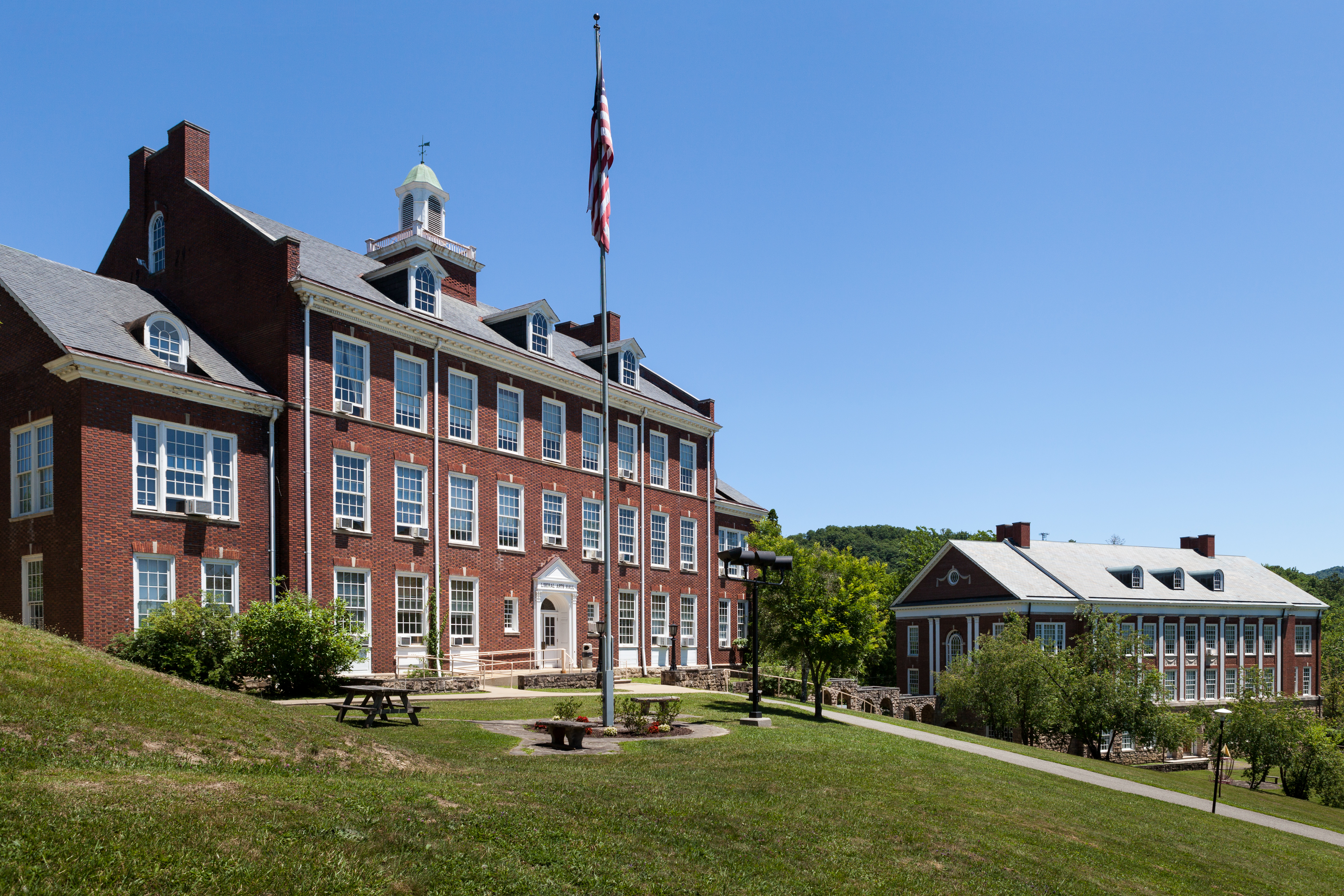
- The Liberal Arts Hall (on the left) and the Albert Hall, in July, 2014

- Location within West Virginia Location within the United States
- Location: Davis and Elkins College campus, Elkins, West Virginia
- Coordinates: 38°55′49″N 79°50′46″W
- Area: 2.5 acres (1.0 ha)
- Built: 1924
- Architect: Walter F. Martens
- Architectural style: Georgian Revival
- NRHP reference No.: 79002599
- Added to NRHP: August 29, 1979

Albert and Liberal Arts Halls are a set of two historic buildings located on the campus of Davis & Elkins College at Elkins, Randolph County, West Virginia. The brick Georgian Revival style buildings were built between 1924 and 1926, and planned as a unit of two distinct and separate buildings connected by a graceful stone arcade. They were designed by noted Charleston architect Walter F. Martens.

Originally each building was 3 1/2 stories, with gable roof and dormers, and slightly recessed 2 1/2-story wings. A fire at the Science Hall (now Albert Hall) in 1956, necessitated removal of the gable roof and a flat roof was installed. The buildings serve as educational offices and classrooms. Albert Hall is named for Charles E. Albert, Professor of Physics, who served as president from 1935 to 1939. The complex was listed on the National Register of Historic Places in 1979.
