= Riverside School (Elkins, West Virginia) =

- U.S. National Register of Historic Places
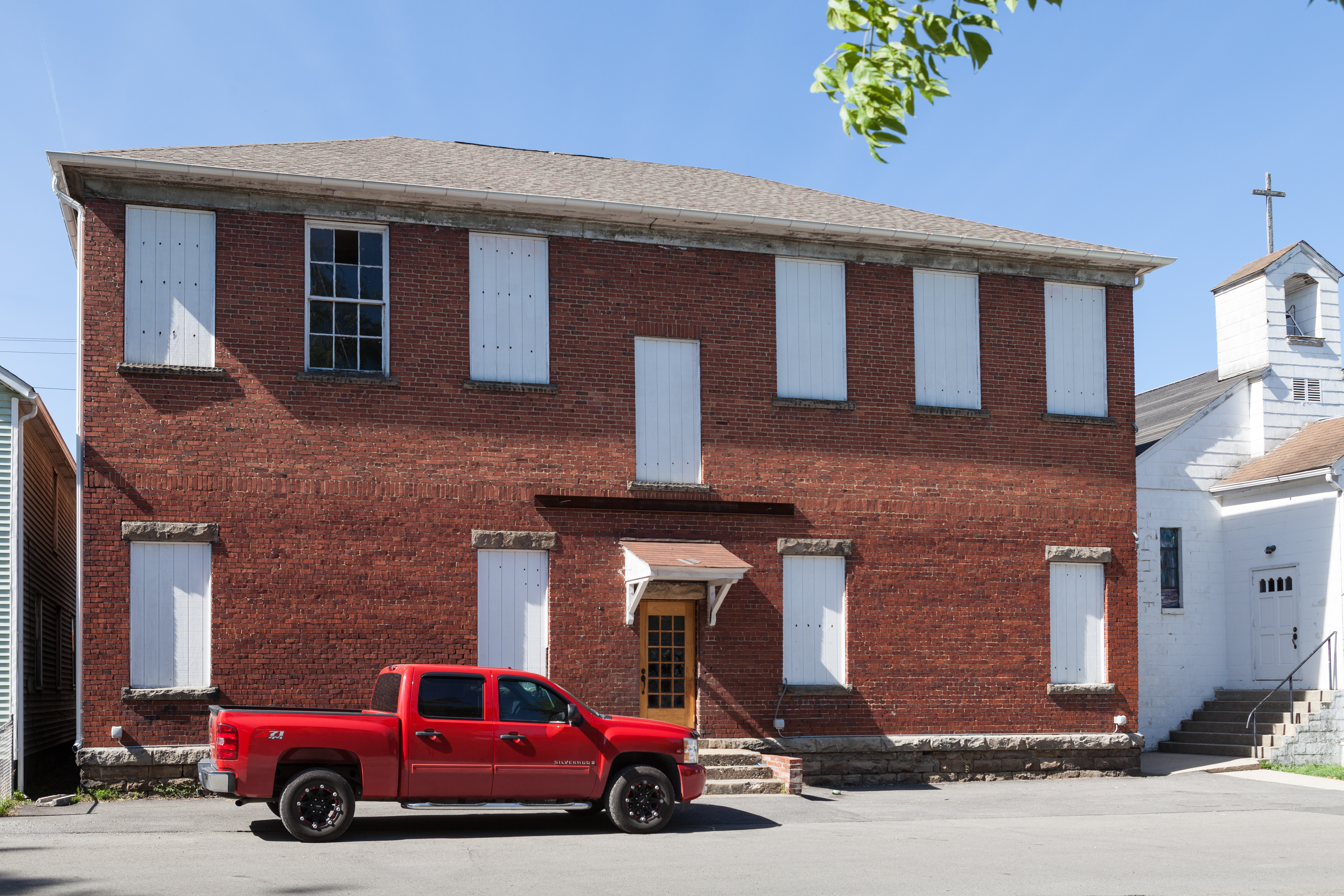
- Looking north from River Street

- Location within West Virginia Location within the United States
- Location: Block No. 1, River St., Elkins, West Virginia
- Coordinates: 38°55′20.4″N 79°50′52.5″W
- Area: 0.3 acres (0.12 ha)
- Built: 1905
- Architect: Frampton & Bowers; Independent School District of Elkin
- Architectural style: two over two, central passage
- NRHP reference No.: 09001194
- Added to NRHP: December 30, 2009

Riverside School is a historic school building located at Elkins, Randolph County, West Virginia, United States. It was built between 1902 and 1905, as a one-story, rectangular red brick structure, measuring 56 feet, 6 inches, by 34 feet. A second story was added in 1928, when it became a four-year high school. It has a hipped roof and a sandstone foundation. It was originally built as a school for African American students, and remained so until the 1954 desegregation order and the school was closed.

It was listed on the National Register of Historic Places in 2009.
