= Jenningston, West Virginia =

- Unincorporated community
- Location within West Virginia Location within the United States
- Coordinates: 38°59′17″N 79°31′50″W
- Country: United States
- State: West Virginia
- County: Tucker
- Elevation: 2,037 ft (621 m)
- Time zone: UTC-5 (Eastern (EST))
  - Summer (DST): UTC-4 (EDT)
- Area codes: 304 & 681
- GNIS feature ID: 1554803

Jenningston is an unincorporated community in Tucker County, West Virginia, United States. Jenningston is located on the Dry Fork, 11 miles (18 km) southeast of Parsons.
