= Graceland (Elkins, West Virginia) =

Historic house in West Virginia, United States

- U.S. National Register of Historic Places
- U.S. National Historic Landmark District – Contributing property
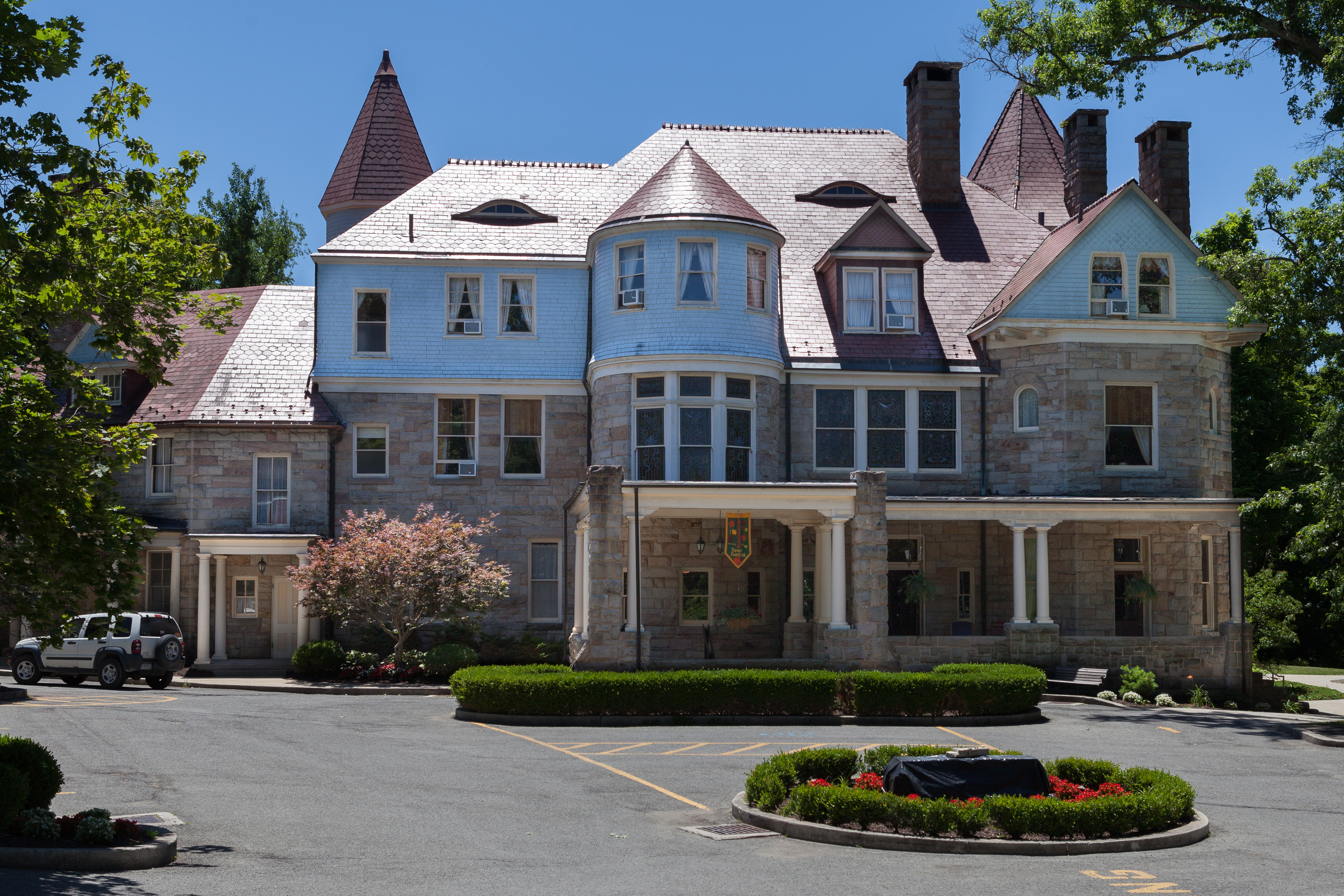
- July 2014

- Location within West Virginia
- Location: Campus of Davis & Elkins College, Elkins, West Virginia
- Coordinates: 38°55′51.1″N 79°50′57.4″W
- Built: 1892
- Part of: Davis and Elkins Historic District (ID96001129)
- NRHP reference No.: 70000666

Significant dates
- Added to NRHP: September 17, 1970
- Designated NHLDCP: June 7, 1998

Graceland is a historic house on the campus of Davis & Elkins College in Elkins, West Virginia. It was the summer home of Henry Gassaway Davis, a United States senator from 1871–1883, and a major force in West Virginia's coal industry in the late 19th century. The mansion was completed in 1893. It is listed on the National Register of Historic Places and is part of the National Historic Landmark Davis and Elkins Historic District. It is now the centerpiece of an inn, restaurant, and conference center.
