= Wymer, Lewis County, West Virginia =

Wymer, West Virginia
- Unincorporated community
- Location within West Virginia Location within the United States
- Coordinates: 38°51′33″N 80°25′19″W
- Country: United States
- State: West Virginia
- County: Lewis
- Elevation: 1,168 ft (356 m)
- Time zone: UTC-5 (Eastern (EST))
  - Summer (DST): UTC-4 (EDT)
- Area codes: 304 & 681
- GNIS feature ID: 1556032

Wymer is an unincorporated community in Lewis County, West Virginia, United States. Wymer is 12.5 miles (20.1 km) south-southeast of Weston.
