= Randolph County Courthouse and Jail =

- U.S. National Register of Historic Places
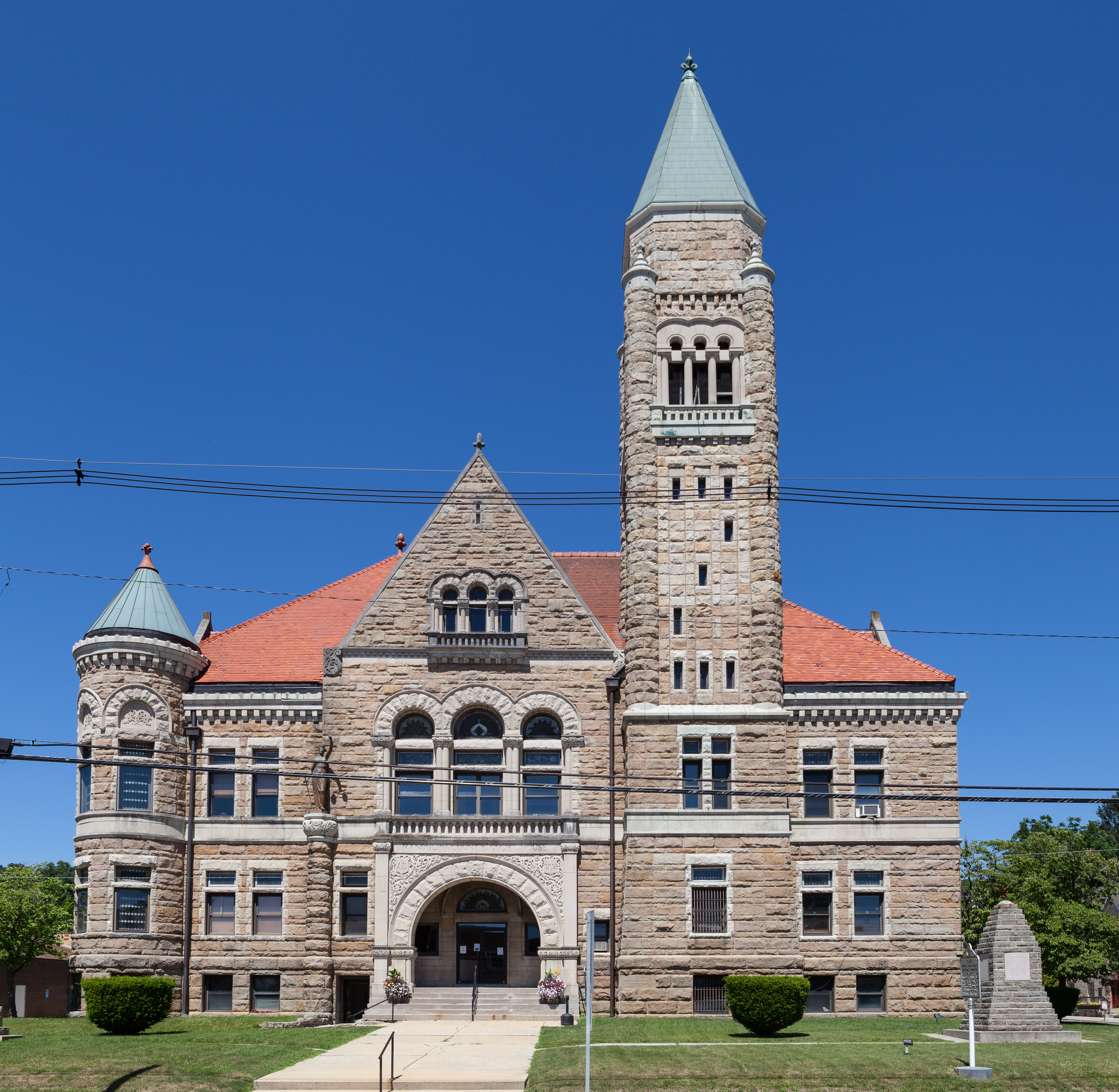
- Looking northeast from Randolph Avenue, July 2014

- Location within West Virginia Location within the United States
- Interactive map showing the location of Randolph County Courthouse and Jail
- Location: Randolph Ave. and High St., Elkins, West Virginia
- Coordinates: 38°55′22″N 79°50′35″W
- Area: 1 acre (0.40 ha)
- Built: 1902
- Architect: Fulton, J. Charles; Conn, J. P.
- Architectural style: Richardsonian Romanesque
- NRHP reference No.: 80004041
- Added to NRHP: November 28, 1980

Randolph County Courthouse and Jail is a historic courthouse and jail located at Elkins, Randolph County, West Virginia. The two buildings were built between 1902 and 1904. They are constructed of brick and faced with stone with contrasting smooth and textured stone trim. The courthouse measures 103 feet by 76 feet, with a tower flanking the entrance pavilion at 150 feet tall. It features a rounded arch entrance in the Richardsonian Romanesque style. The jail features a massive conical-roofed corner tower.

It was listed on the National Register of Historic Places in 1980.
