= Davis Memorial Presbyterian Church =

Church in Elkins, West Virginia

- U.S. National Register of Historic Places
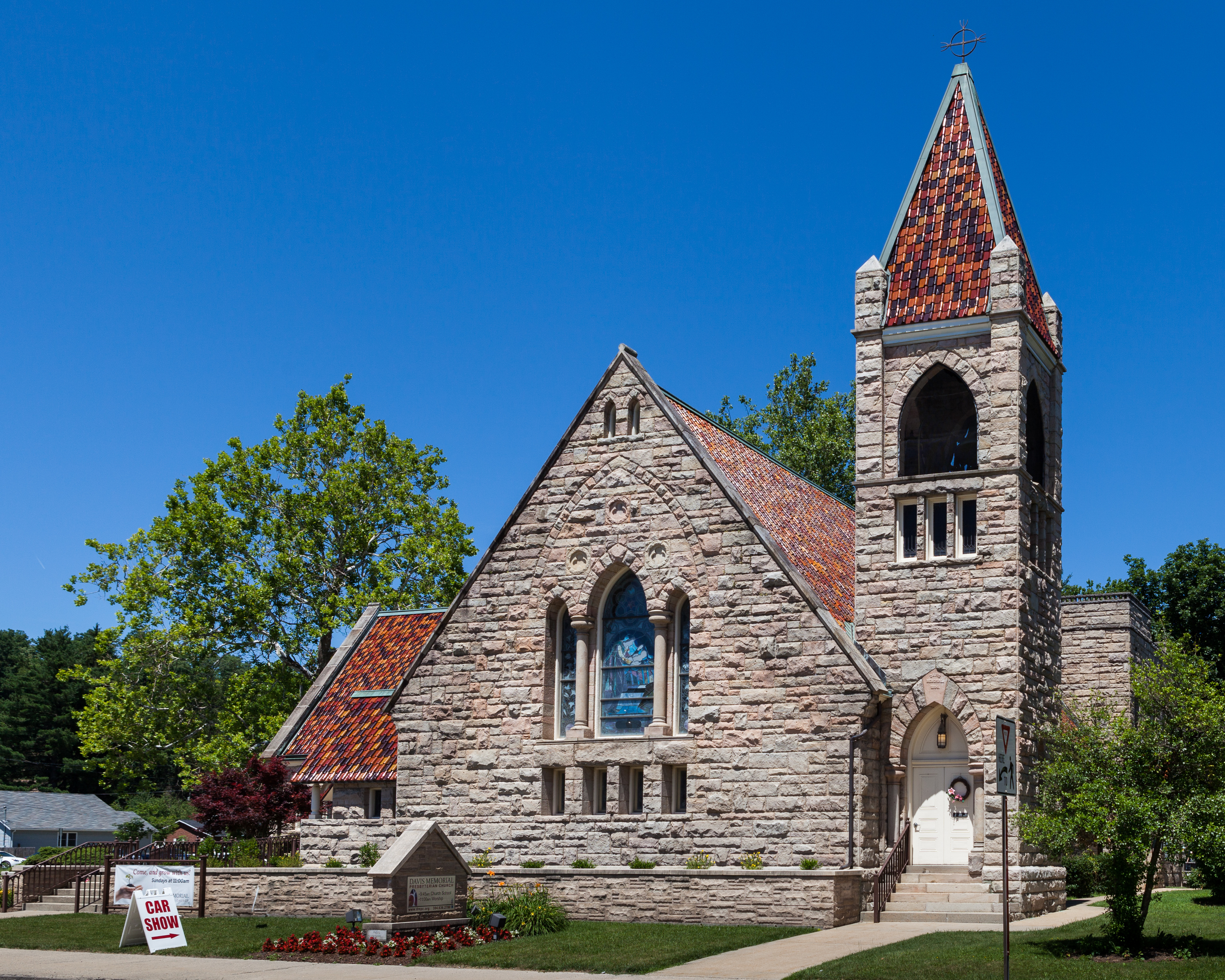
- The church from Randolph Avenue in 2014

- Location within West Virginia Location within the United States
- Location: 450 Randolph Ave., Elkins, West Virginia
- Coordinates: 38°55′38.2″N 79°50′52.4″W
- Area: 0.3 acres (0.12 ha)
- Built: 1894
- Architect: Cassell, Charles E.; Harding, Clarence L.
- Architectural style: Gothic Revival
- NRHP reference No.: 84003664
- Added to NRHP: April 20, 1984

Davis Memorial Presbyterian Church is a historic Presbyterian church at 450 Randolph Avenue in Elkins, Randolph County, West Virginia, United States. It was originally built in 1894 and 1895 after designs prepared by the Baltimore architect Charles E. Cassell. In 1921, an Akron plan Sunday School building was added to the north by Clarence L. Harding of Washington D. C. The building consists of a nave, an engaged tower, and a gable roofed structure located perpendicular to the nave. It is built of a granular conglomerate stone consisting of large, transparent quartz crystals bound in clay or silica. The style is Gothic, with Romanesque and eclectic influences.

It was listed on the National Register of Historic Places in 1984.
