= Wymer, Randolph County, West Virginia =

Wymer, West Virginia
- Unincorporated community
- Location within West Virginia Location within the United States
- Coordinates: 38°53′36″N 79°37′07″W
- Country: United States
- State: West Virginia
- County: Randolph
- Elevation: 3,173 ft (967 m)
- Time zone: UTC-5 (Eastern (EST))
  - Summer (DST): UTC-4 (EDT)
- Area codes: 304 & 681
- GNIS feature ID: 1553527

Wymer is an unincorporated community in Randolph County, West Virginia, United States. Wymer is located on U.S. Route 33, 5.5 miles (8.9 km) southwest of Harman.

The community most likely derives its name from Weimar, in Germany.
