= Elkins, West Virginia =

City in West Virginia, US

- City
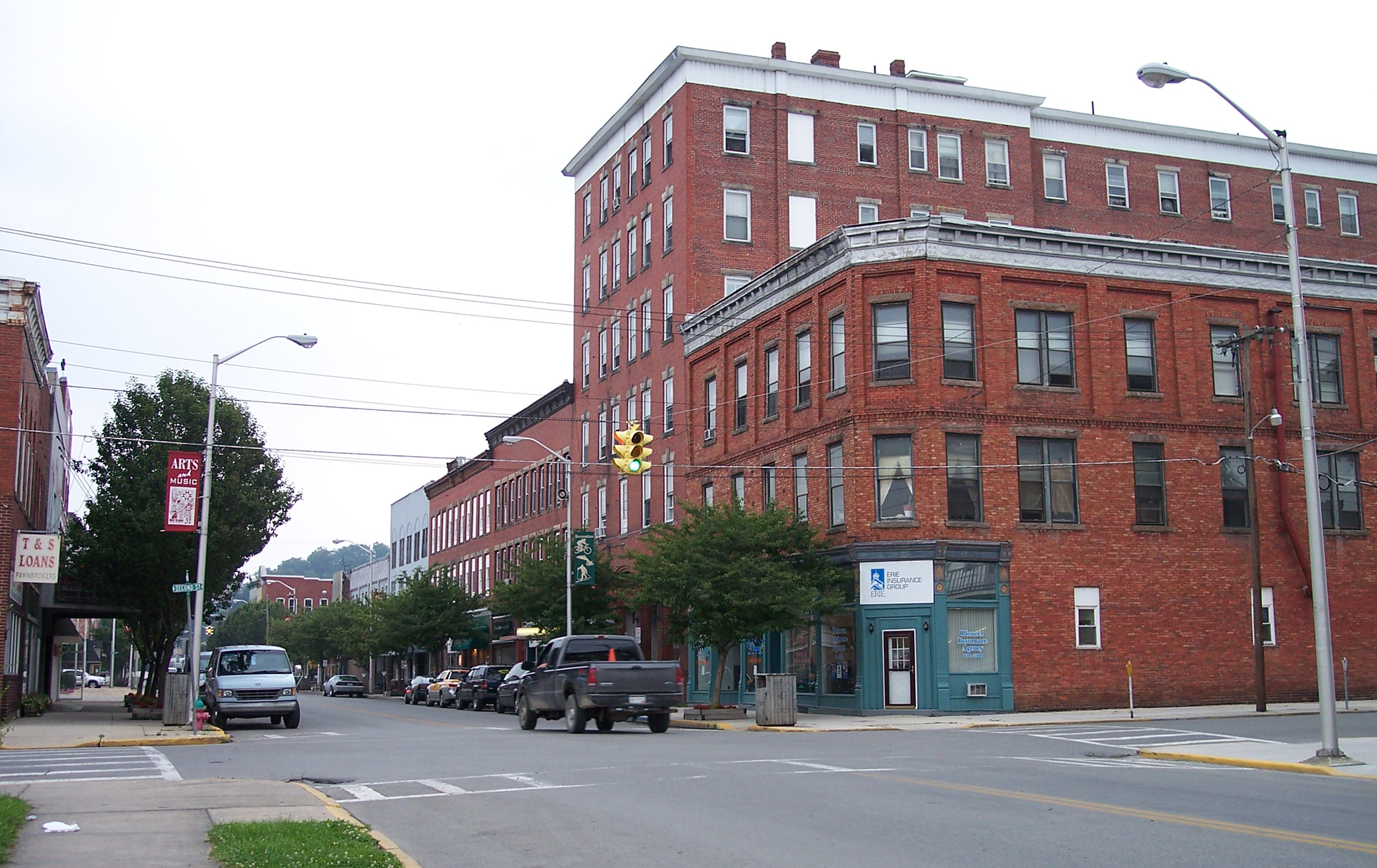
- Davis Avenue in downtown Elkins in 2006

- Seal
- Interactive map of Elkins, West Virginia
- Location within West Virginia Location within the United States
- Coordinates: 38°55′17″N 79°51′3″W
- Country: United States
- State: West Virginia
- County: Randolph
- Established: 1890
- Named after: Stephen B. Elkins

Government
  - Mayor: Jerry A. Marco

Area
  - Total: 3.63 sq mi (9.41 km^{2})
  - Land: 3.63 sq mi (9.41 km^{2})
  - Water: 0 sq mi (0.00 km^{2})
- Elevation: 1,926 ft (587 m)

Population (2020)
  - Total: 6,934
  - Estimate (2021): 6,895
  - Density: 1,923.5/sq mi (742.65/km^{2})
- Time zone: UTC−5 (Eastern (EST))
  - Summer (DST): UTC−4 (EDT)
- ZIP Code: 26241
- Area codes: Area codes 304 and 681
- FIPS code: 54-24580
- GNIS feature ID: 1551037
- Website: cityofelkinswv.gov

Elkins is a city in Randolph County, West Virginia, United States, and its county seat. The population was 6,950 at the 2020 census. It lies along the Tygart Valley River and was incorporated in 1890, taking its name from Stephen B. Elkins, the city's co-founder and later U.S. Senator from West Virginia. Elkins is home to Davis and Elkins College and the Mountain State Forest Festival, held in early October every year.

== History ==
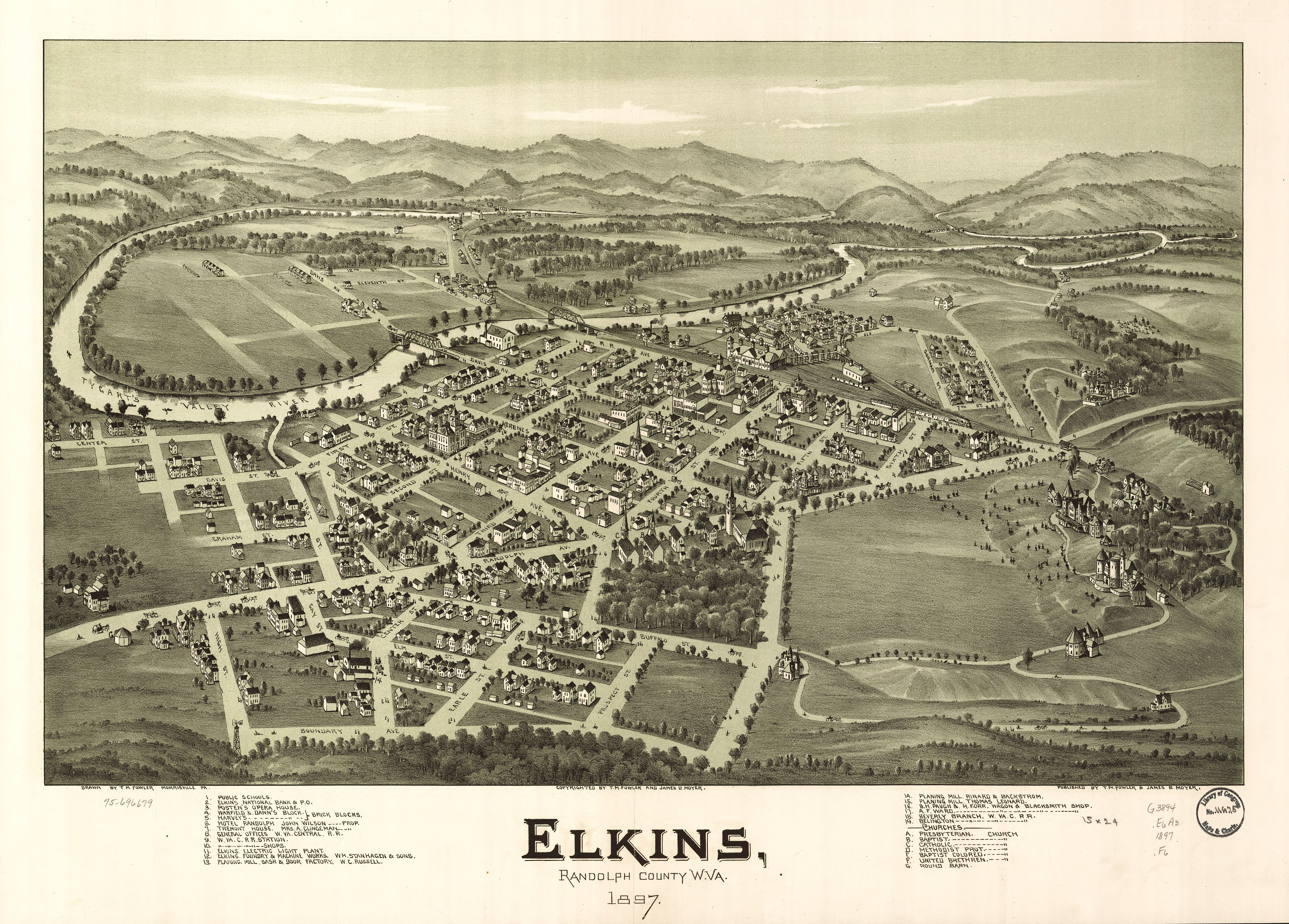
An 1897 bird's eye view of Elkins

Thomas Skidmore (ca. 1733-1807), born in Maryland, obtained a title to 400 acres of land (“by virtue of a settlement”) in the future Elkins area before 1778. This land, on the east side of the Tygart Valley River, was surveyed by John Poage in 1780 and included the land that is now most of downtown Elkins. Thus, Skidmore was probably the first white settler in what became Elkins.

Before its major development, the area that would become Elkins was known as Leadsville, and was the site of a few scattered homesteads – a place where the local farmers' corn crop was loaded onto boats and floated down the Tygart Valley River. The City of Elkins was developed by U.S. Senators Henry G. Davis (1823–1916) and Stephen B. Elkins (1841–1911) – and named for the latter – in 1890. (Elkins was Davis' son-in-law.) The two founders developed railroad lines, coal mines, and timbering businesses. Together, they built the West Virginia Central and Pittsburgh Railway into Elkins in 1889, opening a vast territory to industrial development by the late 1890s. After an intense county seat war with nearby Beverly, where the new county courthouse building was burned down in 1897 under suspicious circumstances, Elkins became the county seat in 1899. This was resolved, however, only after multiple referendums, court judgments, and the mobilization of armed bands in both towns. In the end, bloodshed was averted.

In 1904 the new Randolph County Courthouse – designed in the Richardsonian Romanesque style – was completed in Elkins. As the railroad (merged into the Western Maryland Railway in 1905) expanded, Elkins experienced the luxury of passenger train service. In 1930, 18 passenger trains were arriving and leaving Elkins daily. All passenger service was discontinued in 1958.

Where the view of the new town was most delightful and picturesque, Davis and Elkins each built permanent places of residence, known as Graceland (1893) and Halliehurst (1890), respectively.

Today, Elkins has an active economic development authority, chamber of commerce, downtown business organization and numerous social, fraternal and service organizations that sponsor annual events like the Mountain State Forest Festival, which brings thousands of people into the city every year.

== Geography ==
Elkins is located at the confluence of the Tygart Valley River and Leading Creek. The average elevation is 2,000 feet (610 m) above sea level. According to the United States Census Bureau, the city has a total area of 3.43 square miles (8.88 km^{2}), all land. Elkins is headquarters for the Monongahela National Forest, a 910,155-acre (368,327 ha) federal reserve encompassing the "High Alleghenies" area to the east of the city.

In 1995, a second edition of The 100 Best Small Towns in America, written by Norman Crampton, featured Elkins among the special places in the United States. Crampton quoted then Editor Emerita of The Inter-Mountain, Eldora Marie Bolyard Nuzum, "You can stand on any street in Elkins and turn in all directions and see forest covered mountains rimming the city. It is unbelievable."

=== Climate ===
Record weather events include:

- High temperature: 99 °F (37 °C) on July 16, 1988 and on August 6, 1918
- Highest daily minimum: 78 °F (26 °C) on July 21, 1930
- Lowest daily maximum: −6 °F (−21 °C) on December 25, 1983
- Low temperature: −28 °F (−33 °C) on December 30, 1917
- Highest one-day snowfall: 19.9 inches (51 cm), on December 19, 2009.
- Highest one-day precipitation: 5.02 inches (12.8 cm), on November 4, 1985.

Climate data for Elkins, West Virginia (Elkins–Randolph County Airport/KEKN), 1991–2020 normals, (Note: Mean monthly maxima and minima (i.e. the expected highest and lowest temperature readings at any point during the year or given month) calculated based on data at said location from 1991 to 2020.) extremes 1899–present
Month	Jan	Feb	Mar	Apr	May	Jun	Jul	Aug	Sep	Oct	Nov	Dec	Year
Record high °F (°C)	78 (26)	77 (25)	86 (30)	90 (32)	93 (34)	96 (36)	99 (37)	99 (37)	97 (36)	90 (32)	82 (28)	76 (24)	99 (37)
Mean maximum °F (°C)	64 (18)	66 (19)	75 (24)	82 (28)	86 (30)	88 (31)	90 (32)	89 (32)	87 (31)	81 (27)	74 (23)	65 (18)	91 (33)
Mean daily maximum °F (°C)	41.5 (5.3)	45.1 (7.3)	53.5 (11.9)	65.6 (18.7)	73.4 (23.0)	80.2 (26.8)	83.2 (28.4)	82.1 (27.8)	76.6 (24.8)	66.3 (19.1)	54.8 (12.7)	45.2 (7.3)	64.0 (17.8)
Daily mean °F (°C)	30.8 (−0.7)	33.5 (0.8)	41.0 (5.0)	51.5 (10.8)	60.2 (15.7)	67.8 (19.9)	71.4 (21.9)	70.2 (21.2)	64.1 (17.8)	52.7 (11.5)	42.3 (5.7)	34.7 (1.5)	51.7 (10.9)
Mean daily minimum °F (°C)	20.0 (−6.7)	22.0 (−5.6)	28.5 (−1.9)	37.3 (2.9)	47.0 (8.3)	55.5 (13.1)	59.6 (15.3)	58.4 (14.7)	51.5 (10.8)	39.1 (3.9)	29.9 (−1.2)	24.1 (−4.4)	39.4 (4.1)
Mean minimum °F (°C)	−6 (−21)	−2 (−19)	8 (−13)	21 (−6)	30 (−1)	42 (6)	48 (9)	48 (9)	37 (3)	24 (−4)	14 (−10)	3 (−16)	−9 (−23)
Record low °F (°C)	−24 (−31)	−22 (−30)	−15 (−26)	3 (−16)	20 (−7)	25 (−4)	32 (0)	34 (1)	26 (−3)	11 (−12)	−8 (−22)	−28 (−33)	−28 (−33)
Average precipitation inches (mm)	3.36 (85)	3.26 (83)	3.98 (101)	4.10 (104)	5.14 (131)	4.48 (114)	5.99 (152)	3.87 (98)	3.51 (89)	3.08 (78)	2.87 (73)	3.57 (91)	47.21 (1,199)
Average snowfall inches (cm)	20.3 (52)	15.4 (39)	11.4 (29)	2.3 (5.8)	0.0 (0.0)	0.0 (0.0)	0.0 (0.0)	0.0 (0.0)	0.0 (0.0)	0.9 (2.3)	4.1 (10)	14.5 (37)	68.9 (175)
Average precipitation days (≥ 0.01 in)	17.3	15.5	16.6	15.1	16.0	14.6	14.9	12.7	10.6	11.4	12.2	16.3	173.2
Average snowy days (≥ 0.1 in)	11.0	8.8	5.8	1.8	0.0	0.0	0.0	0.0	0.0	0.4	2.7	7.8	38.3
Source: NOAA

== Demographics ==
Historical population
Census	Pop.	Note	%±
1890	737		—
1900	2,016		173.5%
1910	5,260		160.9%
1920	6,788		29.0%
1930	7,345		8.2%
1940	8,133		10.7%
1950	9,121		12.1%
1960	8,307		−8.9%
1970	8,287		−0.2%
1980	8,536		3.0%
1990	7,420		−13.1%
2000	7,032		−5.2%
2010	7,094		0.9%
2020	6,934		−2.3%
2021 (est.)	6,895		−0.6%
U.S. Decennial Census; 2012 Estimate

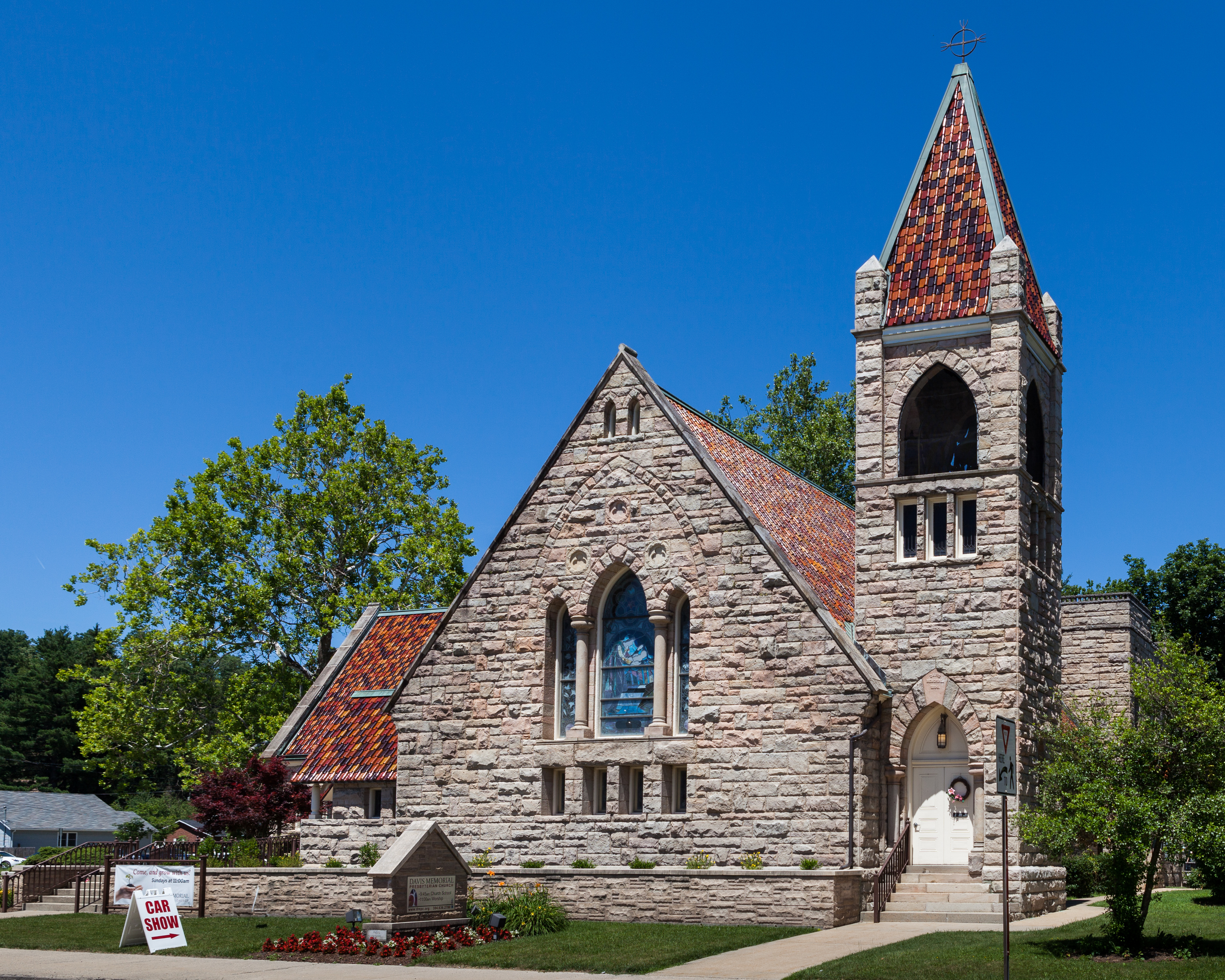
Davis Memorial Presbyterian Church is noted for its Gothic Revival architecture

=== 2020 census ===
As of the 2020 census, Elkins had a population of 6,934. The median age was 39.9 years. 18.5% of residents were under the age of 18 and 21.0% of residents were 65 years of age or older. For every 100 females there were 93.8 males, and for every 100 females age 18 and over there were 91.3 males age 18 and over.

99.0% of residents lived in urban areas, while 1.0% lived in rural areas.

There were 2,957 households in Elkins, of which 24.4% had children under the age of 18 living in them. Of all households, 36.8% were married-couple households, 20.4% were households with a male householder and no spouse or partner present, and 33.1% were households with a female householder and no spouse or partner present. About 37.5% of all households were made up of individuals and 16.8% had someone living alone who was 65 years of age or older.

There were 3,499 housing units, of which 15.5% were vacant. The homeowner vacancy rate was 3.1% and the rental vacancy rate was 13.8%.

Racial composition as of the 2020 census
Race	Number	Percent
White	6,279	90.6%
Black or African American	185	2.7%
American Indian and Alaska Native	28	0.4%
Asian	69	1.0%
Native Hawaiian and Other Pacific Islander	1	0.0%
Some other race	35	0.5%
Two or more races	337	4.9%
Hispanic or Latino (of any race)	116	1.7%

=== 2010 census ===
As of the census of 2010, there were 7,094 people, 3,038 households, and 1,756 families living in the city. The population density was 2,068.2 inhabitants per square mile (798.5/km^{2}). There were 3,421 housing units at an average density of 997.4 per square mile (385.1/km^{2}). The racial makeup of the city was 96.5% White, 1.2% African American, 0.2% Native American, 0.8% Asian, 0.2% from other races, and 1.2% from two or more races. Hispanic or Latino of any race were 1.1% of the population.

There were 3,038 households, of which 26.0% had children under the age of 18 living with them, 40.6% were married couples living together, 12.5% had a female householder with no husband present, 4.8% had a male householder with no wife present, and 42.2% were non-families. Of all households 35.4% were made up of individuals, and 14.9% had someone living alone who was 65 years of age or older. The average household size was 2.19 and the average family size was 2.80.

The median age in the city was 39.6 years. 20.9% of residents were under the age of 18; 12.2% were between the ages of 18 and 24; 23.2% were from 25 to 44; 26.1% were from 45 to 64; and 17.6% were 65 years of age or older. The gender makeup of the city was 48.0% male and 52.0% female.

=== 2000 census ===
As of the census of 2000, there were 7,032 people, 2,988 households, and 1,756 families living in the city. The population density was 2,207.7 people per square mile (851.1/km^{2}). There were 3,362 housing units at an average density of 1,055.5 per square mile (406.9/km^{2}). The racial makeup of the city was 96.94% White, 0.90% African American, 0.30% Native American, 0.95% Asian, 0.31% from other races, and 0.60% from two or more races. Hispanic or Latino of any race were 0.77% of the population.

There were 2,988 households, out of which 25.0% had children under the age of 18 living with them, 43.4% were married couples living together, 11.9% had a female householder with no husband present, and 41.2% were non-families. Of all households 35.8% were made up of individuals, and 15.0% had someone living alone who was 65 years of age or older. The average household size was 2.19 and the average family size was 2.83.

In the city the population was spread out, with 21.2% under the age of 18, 11.7% from 18 to 24, 25.4% from 25 to 44, 24.0% from 45 to 64, and 17.7% who were 65 years of age or older. The median age was 39 years. For every 100 females, there were 92.4 males. For every 100 females age 18 and over, there were 86.9 males.

The median income for a household in the city was $26,906, and the median income for a family was $34,291. Males had a median income of $27,012 versus $19,154 for females. The per capita income for the city was $17,916. About 14.4% of families and 19.0% of the population were below the poverty line, including 25.4% of those under age 18 and 9.6% of those age 65 or over.

== Events ==
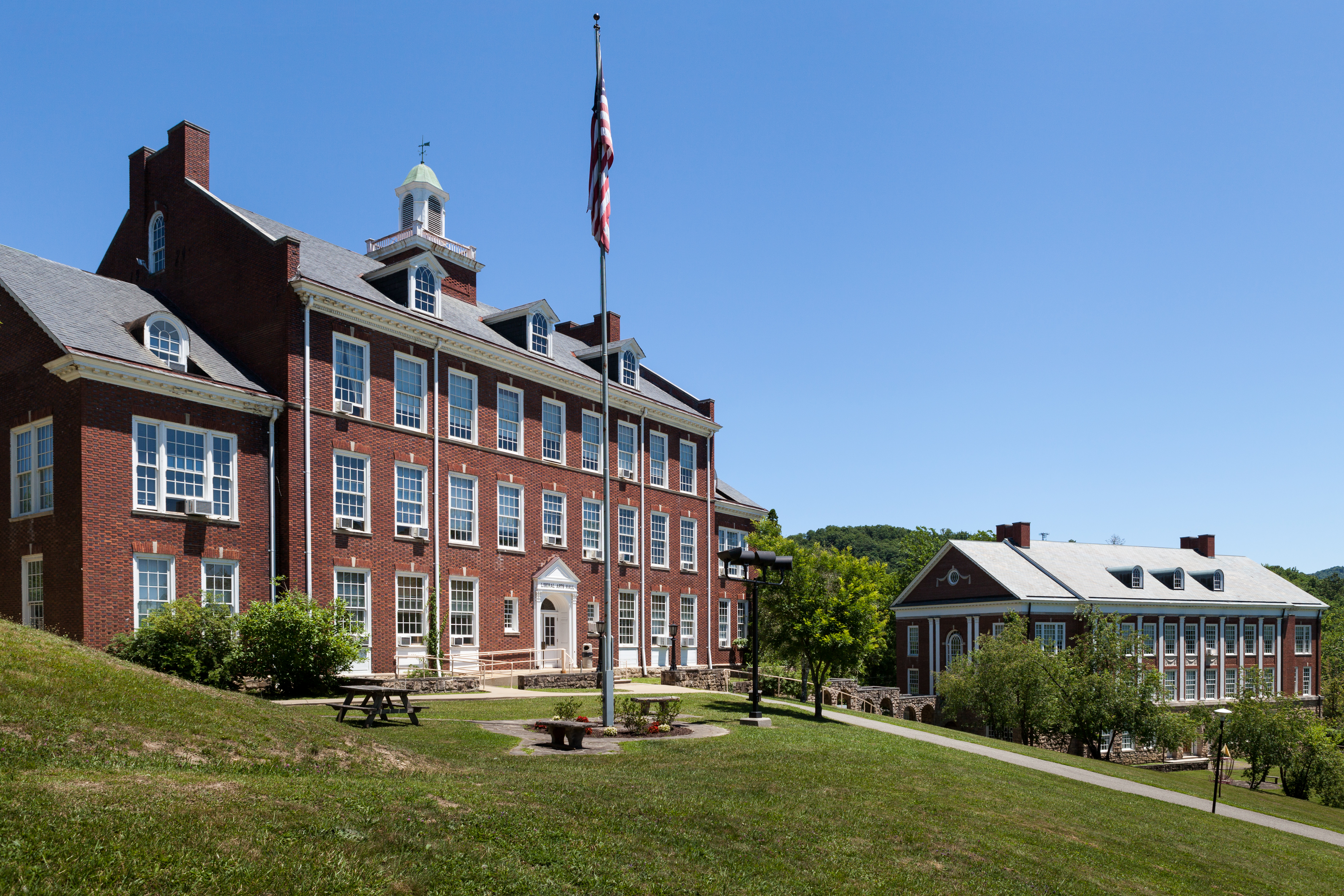
Albert and Liberal Arts Halls at Davis & Elkins College

Augusta Heritage Festival is a music and heritage festival, with 10+ themes ranging from Old Time, Blue Grass, Cajun, Irish, dance, wood and metal working and more. Attracting musicians and students from around the world, it is held on the Davis and Elkins College campus and in town over 5 consecutive weeks every summer, typically in July and August. There is also a week-long Old Time event in October, and a dulcimer week in the spring.

== Parks and recreation ==
Elkins is a qualified Tree City USA as recognized by the National Arbor Day Foundation.

== Transportation ==
Elkins sits at the junction of US 33, US 219, and US 250. Heading west of the city, US 33 is Corridor H, a major four-lane highway connecting to Buckhannon and Interstate 79 at Weston. Long-term plans call for Corridor H to be extended further past its current ending at Kerens eventually to Interstate 81 at Strasburg, Virginia.

Elkins-Randolph County Airport (Jennings Randolph Airfield) is a regional airport with two runways, each approximately 4,500 feet (1,400 m) long.

The western terminus of the Allegheny Trail is in Elkins.

== Notable people ==
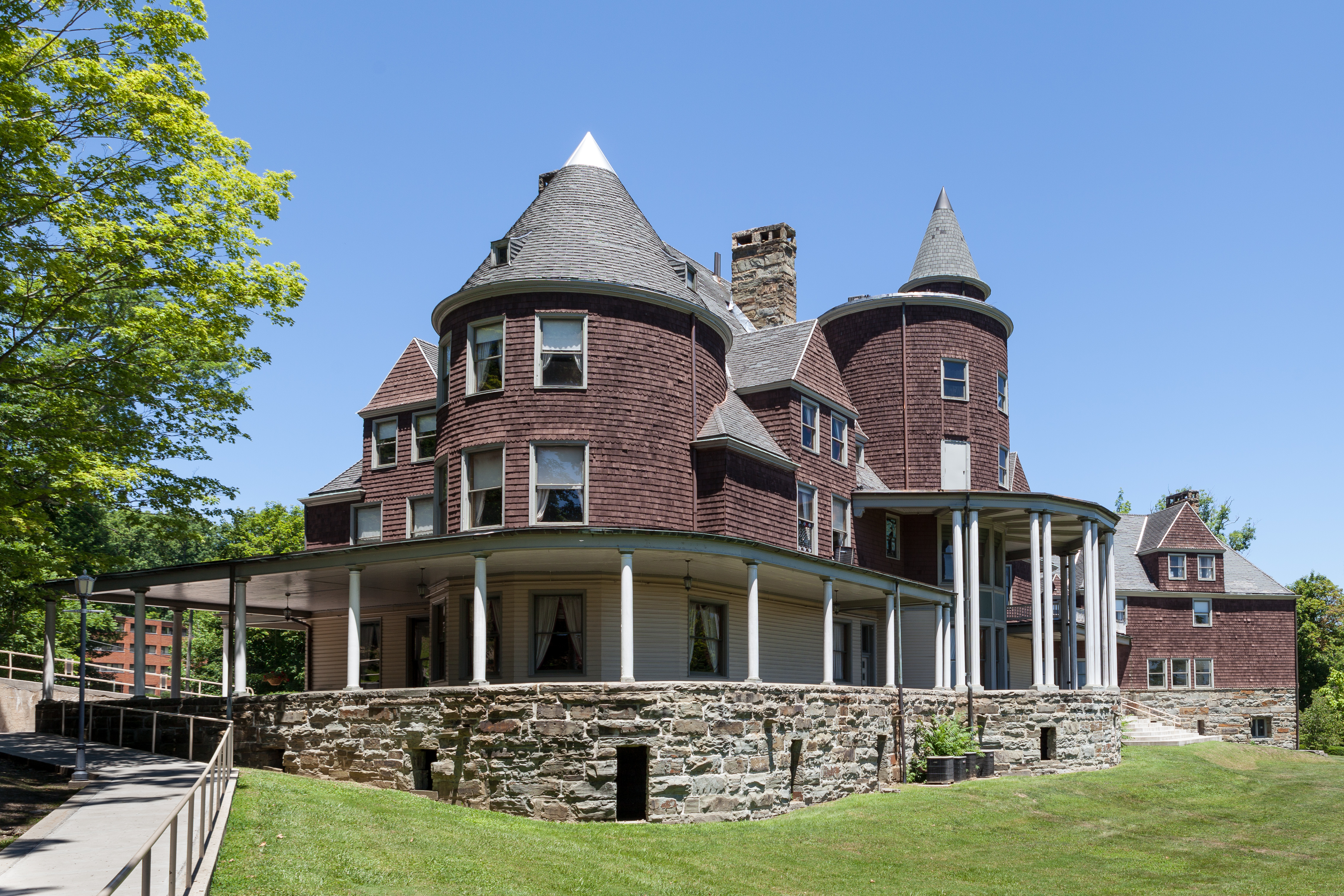
Halliehurst was the summer estate of Senator Stephen Benton Elkins, who founded the city.

- James E. Allen, Jr., educator
- Randy Armstrong, musician and multi-instrumentalist
- Herman Ball, American football player
- Wally Barron, 26th governor of West Virginia from 1961–1965
- Henry G. Davis, U.S. senator from West Virginia from 1871–83 and Democratic nominee for Vice President in 1904; co-founder of Elkins
- Stephen B. Elkins, U.S. senator from West Virginia from 1895–1911; co-founder and namesake of Elkins
- Del Gainer, baseball player
- Marshall Goldberg, National Football League all-pro player
- Katherine Hoover, composer and flutist
- Jonathan Kyle, West Virginia House of Delegates from the 66th district
- Eldora Nuzum, first female editor of a daily newspaper in West Virginia and interviewer of U.S. Presidents
- John Ochsendorf, MIT Professor and MacArthur Fellow
- Jae Spears, West Virginia state legislator
- Tre Smith, Canadian Football League running back
- Doug Van Gundy, musician and poet
