= Hotel Seville NoMad =

Hotel in Manhattan, New York

- Seville Hotel
- U.S. National Register of Historic Places
- New York State Register of Historic Places
- New York City Landmark
- (2026)
- Location: 22 East 29th Street (88 Madison Avenue); Manhattan, New York
- Coordinates: 40°44′40.5″N 73°59′08″W
- Built: 1904 (original); 1907 (annex)
- Architects: Harry Allan Jacobs (original); Charles T. Mott (annex)
- Architectural style: Beaux-Arts
- NRHP reference No.: 05000088
- NYSRHP No.: 06101.012275
- NYCL No.: 2602

Significant dates
- Added to NRHP: February 24, 2005
- Designated NYSRHP: December 18, 2004
- Designated NYCL: March 6, 2018

The Hotel Seville NoMad (formerly the Seville Hotel, Carlton Hotel, and James New York NoMad) is a hotel at 22 East 29th Street, at the southwest corner with Madison Avenue in the NoMad neighborhood of Manhattan in New York City, United States. The original 12-story hotel on Madison Avenue was completed in 1904 to designs by Harry Allan Jacobs. The 11-story annex to the west was designed by Charles T. Mott and completed in 1907, while a three-story annex at 88 Madison Avenue to the south was finished in 2004 and designed by the Rockwell Group. The hotel is a New York City designated landmark and is listed on the National Register of Historic Places.

The original portions of the hotel were designed in the Beaux-Arts style. The facade is divided horizontally into three sections and is largely made of brick, terracotta, and limestone above the first story. Each facade is also split vertically into bays, with ornamentation such as balconies and curved metal windows. The hotel's original public rooms, which included a lobby and restaurants, were in the basement and first floor; many of these spaces have since been modified. The modern-day lobby is within the annex at 88 Madison Avenue and leads to restaurant spaces. The upper stories contain 360 guest units, which face either the street or three interior light courts.

The developer Maitland E. Graves began constructing the hotel in 1901 and named it the Seville, but he ran out of money before the hotel was finished. A syndicate that included Louis C. Raegener took over the project in 1903 and opened the Seville Hotel the next year. The Seville was extremely popular among visitors soon after it opened, prompting Raegener to add an annex between 1906 and 1907. Raegener and his company, the Roy Realty Company, continued to operate the Seville until 1946. The Hotel Seville's popularity began to decline in the mid-20th century as businesses and entertainment venues relocated uptown, and it became a single room occupancy hotel in the late 20th century. The Seville was renamed the Carlton in 1987. The Wolfson family bought the hotel in the late 1990s and renovated it extensively in the early 2000s and the 2010s. The GFI Capital Resources Group bought the hotel in 2015 and renovated it again, reopening it as the James NoMad Hotel in 2018. Hyatt acquired the hotel in 2025, renovating it yet again and rebranding it as Hotel Seville NoMad.

== Site ==
The Hotel Seville NoMad is at 22 East 29th Street, at the southwest corner with Madison Avenue, in the NoMad neighborhood of Manhattan in New York City. The land lot is L-shaped, wrapping around another structure at the northwest corner of 28th Street and Madison Avenue, and measures 205,132 square feet (19,057.4 m^{2}). The original hotel and annex have a frontage of 75 feet (23 m) on Madison Avenue to the east, 150 ft (46 m) on 29th Street to the north, and 50 ft (15 m) on 28th Street to the west. Neighboring buildings include the Church of the Transfiguration, Episcopal to the north, the Prince George Hotel and Hotel Latham to the south, the New York Life Building to the southeast, and the Emmet Building and Martha Washington Hotel to the east.

Prior to the present hotel's construction, the site was occupied by the Madison Avenue Presbyterian Church, built in 1844. This was replaced in 1875 by the Rutgers Presbyterian Church, which moved uptown in 1890. The Scottish Rite Hall acquired the Rutgers Presbyterian Church building in 1887. The structure was used as a Masonic Hall until 1901, when it was sold.

== Architecture ==
Hotel Seville NoMad (originally the Seville Hotel) is designed in the Beaux-Arts style. It consists of the 12-story original hotel at the corner of Madison Avenue and 29th Street, as well as an 11-story annex in the middle of the block on 28th and 29th Streets. There is also a three-story annex in the middle of the block on Madison Avenue, which includes the hotel's lobby. The original portion of the hotel was one of the first buildings designed by Harry Allan Jacobs, who was also responsible for the Hotel Marseilles and the Andrew Freedman Home. The 28th and 29th Street annex was the work of architect Charles T. Mott, who specialized in row houses in New York City.

=== Form and facade ===
The facade is vertically divided into four bays on Madison Avenue, three on 28th Street, and nine on 29th Street (six in the original building and three in the annex). A chamfered corner with one bay connects the Madison Avenue and 29th Street elevations of the facade. Each elevation is divided horizontally into three parts; a base, midsection, and capital. The base consists of the basement and first three stories; the midsection comprises the fourth through tenth stories; and the capital consists of the eleventh and twelfth stories. The three sections are separated from each other by cornices. Most of the windows have been replaced over the years.

The original part of the building is U-shaped with a light court facing south, while the annex is I-shaped with light courts facing west and east. There is an areaway with an iron-pipe railing along both Madison Avenue and 29th Street, behind which the basement windows are visible. A three-story annex on 88 Madison Avenue was completed in 2004, supplanting the hotel's original lobby at 22 East 29th Street.

==== Original building ====
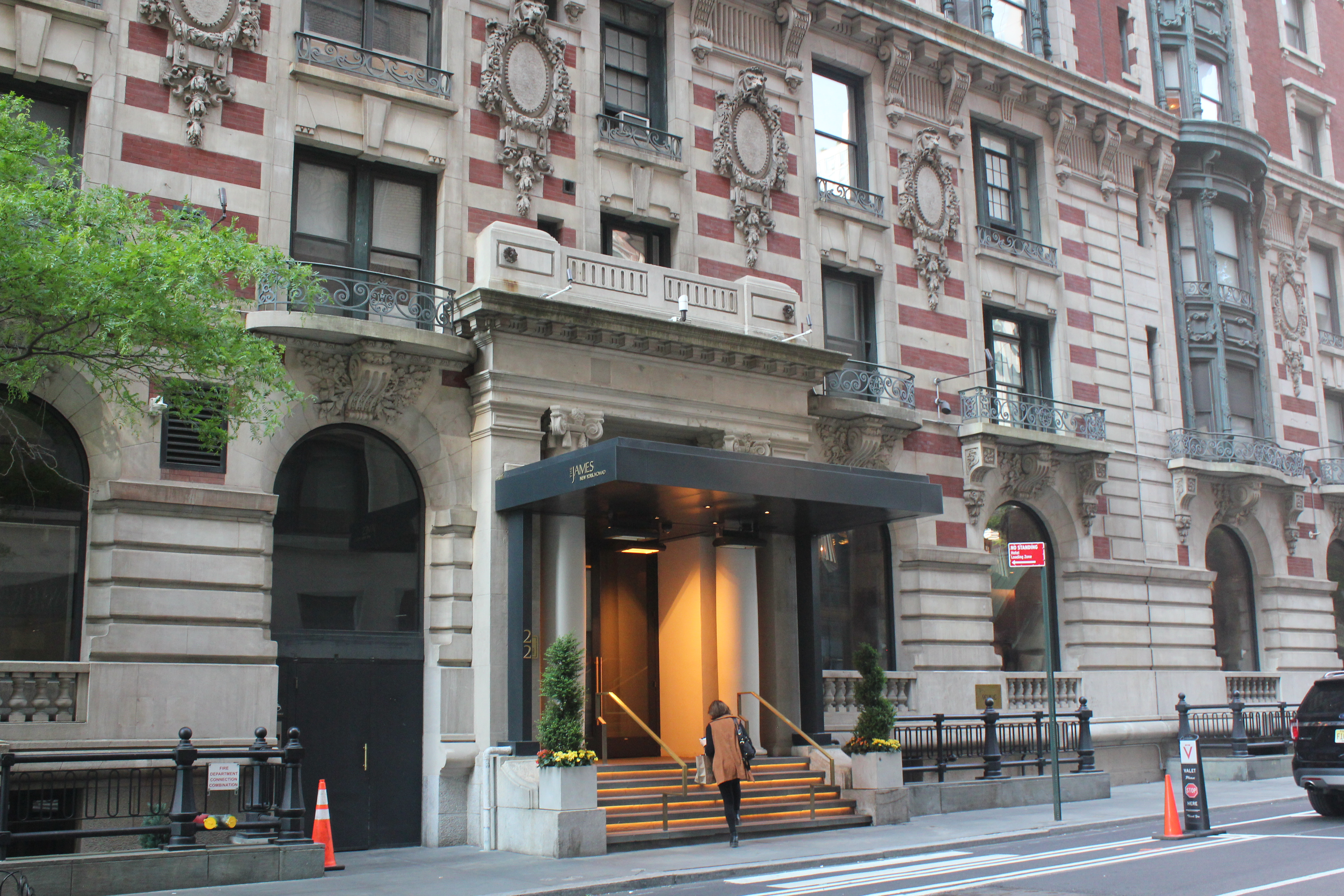
29th Street entrance

The basement is clad in granite ashlar with rectangular windows. Much of the first story contains a facade of rusticated limestone blocks, while the corners are decorated with limestone quoins. The Seville Hotel's original main entrance is through a slightly protruding portico on 29th Street, The portico consists of Ionic columns in antis, with Tuscan or Doric pilasters on the outside, all of which support an entablature. There is also a canopy above the entrance, dating from the 2010s. At ground level, on both sides of the 29th Street entrance, are high round-arched openings with concave frames, balustrades, and keystones flanked by carvings of oak leaves. The southern three bays on Madison Avenue have similar round-arched openings, but the keystones are not flanked by carvings. The chamfered corner has an entrance, topped by a round arch with a keystone, balustrade, and rough stone blocks. The northernmost bay on Madison Avenue and the easternmost bay on 29th Street include a rectangular metal-framed window at the first story, which is divided into six panes by mullions and a transom bar.

The second and third stories of the original building have limestone-framed rectangular window openings. Some of these openings retain their original windows, which consisted of double-hung sash windows flanked by sidelights, Almost all of the second-story windows on 29th Street and Madison Avenue have protruding limestone balconettes with decorative iron railings. There are guttae and keystones on the second-story windows' lintels. Some of the bays are wider than the others (Note: The first and third bays from the south on Madison Avenue, and the third, sixth, seventh, and ninth bays from the east on 29th Street, are wider than the other bays.) and contain large console brackets below the balconette. On the third story, there are oval terracotta cartouches depicting lions' heads and foliage between each of the windows. Each bay includes rectangular windows with iron railings and is flanked by brackets. The chamfered corner has similar decorations, except that the third-story window is a round arch. A cornice with modillions and dentils runs above the third story.

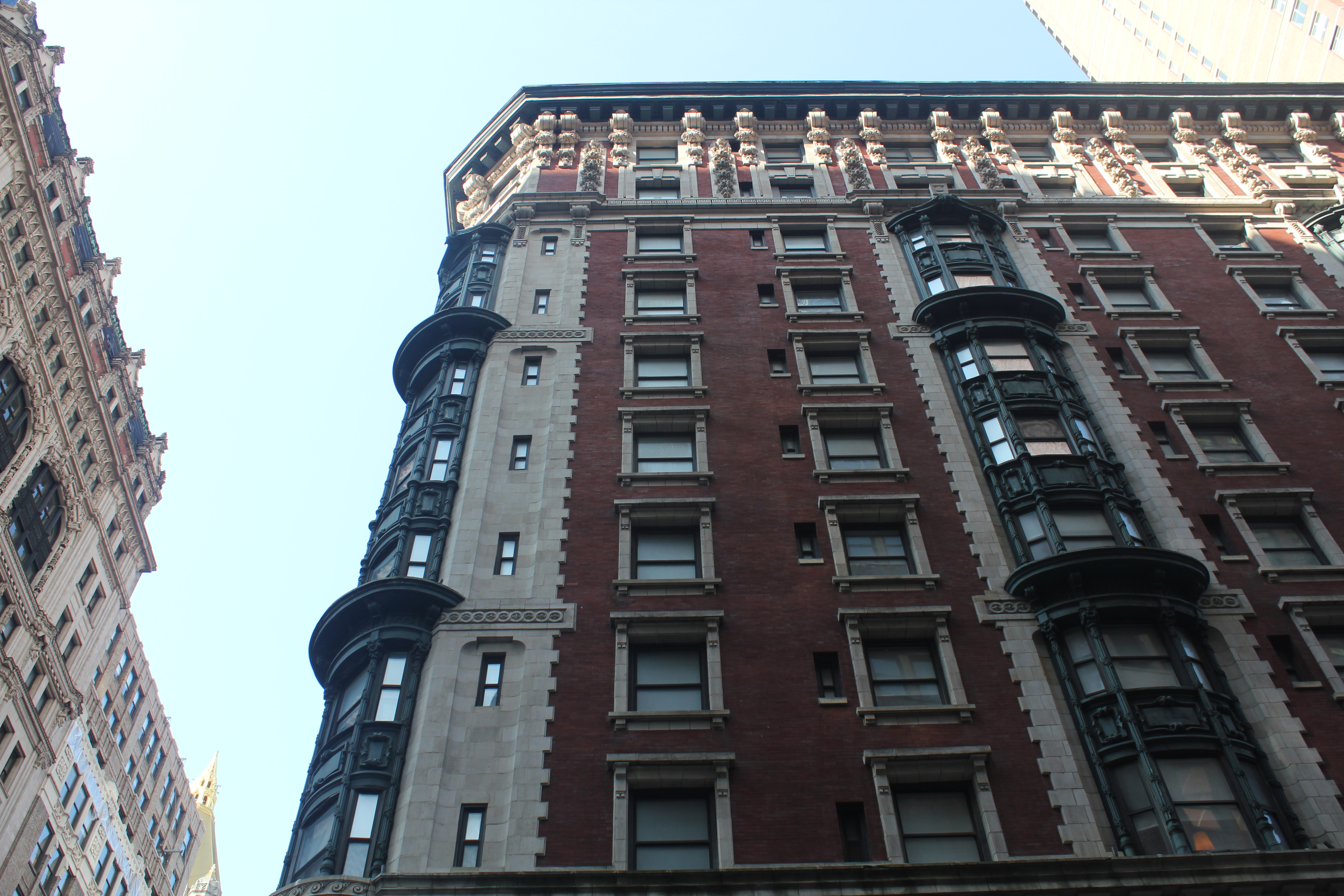
Easternmost bays on the 29th Street facade of the original building

On the fourth to tenth stories, the facade of the original hotel is largely made of brick with limestone or terracotta trim, and the window arrangement is similar to that on the base. The narrow bays on Madison Avenue and 29th Street (Note: The second and fourth bays from the south on Madison Avenue, and the first, second, fourth, fifth, and eighth bays from the east on 29th Street, are narrower than the other bays.) have rectangular window openings with slightly protruding limestone frames; the sills and lintels in these bays are both supported by brackets. The wide bays are clad in metal and curve outward; each bay is divided into three vertical sections by mullions and contain scrolled spandrel panels. These metal bays are flanked by quoins and are decorated with curved cornices and guilloché panels above the fifth and eighth stories. The chamfered corner has a similar metal bay flanked by a strip of terracotta. There are several bays of tiny rectangular windows on both Madison Avenue and 29th Street, including one on each side of the chamfered corner. Above the tenth story runs a cornice with a Greek key pattern, as well as curved hoods that protrude from each of the wide bays.

The original hotel's top two stories constitute the crown and are clad in red brick. Each bay contains a masonry frame that surrounds flat-arched windows the eleventh and twelfth stories; there are also keystones above the eleventh stories. Double-height vertical panels are placed between each bay. Above the twelfth story are large console brackets and dentils, as well as a protruding metal cornice with modillions. The northwestern corner of the structure includes a single-story penthouse. The southern elevation of the original facade is split into two wings by the light court. Both wings are clad in plain brick and have three bays of windows that are flush with the facade. Two angled metal bays are also visible in the light court itself.

==== Annex ====
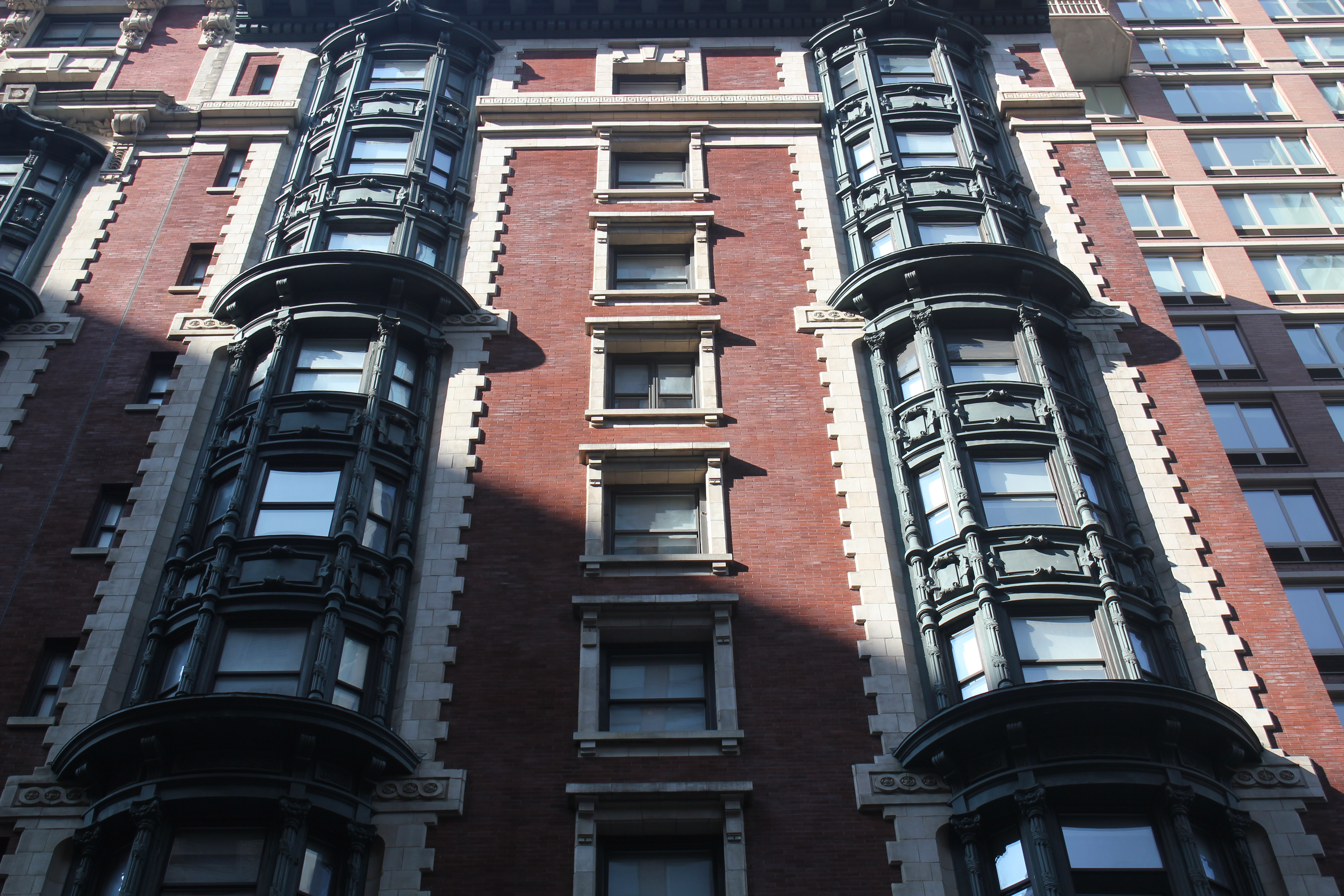
Annex facade on 29th Street

The annex faces both 28th and 29th Street; on both streets. the facade is three stories tall. The facade of the annex is similar in design to that of the original building, although it is only 11 stories tall and lacks some of the original building's details. On 29th Street, the basement is recessed from the areaway and has rectangular windows. The ground story contains a rusticated-limestone facade with three round-arched windows, similar to those in the original building. On the second through eleventh stories, the central bay includes rectangular windows with slightly protruding frames, while the outer bays have curving metal windows, similar to in the original building. The limestone-and-brick strips of the original building extend to the second and third floors of the annex, and there are cartouches between the third-story windows. The fourth through eleventh stories are clad in brick. A cornice with a Greek key pattern runs above the tenth story, and a protruding metal cornice with modillions runs above the eleventh story.

The 28th Street elevation of the annex is also three bays wide and is a simplified version of the 29th Street elevation. The basement is not visible, and the first story is shorter than in the rest of the building. At ground level, there was an entrance flanked by storefront windows. The central second-floor window formerly had a molded frame with a cartouche above it, but this cartouche was removed in the mid-2010s, when double-height openings were added to all three bays. Above the base, the facade is made of brick. The central bay contains rectangular windows with slightly protruding frames, while the outer bays have angled metal windows flanked by quoins. There is an additional, smaller rectangular window on each story between the central and easternmost bays. A cornice runs above the eleventh story.

The western elevation of the annex can be seen from a neighboring plaza on 28th Street. This elevation has a plain brick facade, within which are three bays of angled metal windows. There are also several bays of rectangular windows in varying sizes, which are flush with the facade; they are mostly double-hung windows. The eastern elevation also has two angled metal bays within a plain brick facade.

=== Interior ===
Originally, the hotel's main public rooms were in the basement and first floor, while the upper stories housed the guestrooms. There was a main entrance on 29th Street, as well as a side entrance at the corner of Madison Avenue and 29th Street (which led to the basement). The three-story annex that was completed in 2004 covers 17,000 square feet (1,600 m^{2}).

==== Lower stories ====
The first floor originally included the lobby, main hotel office, dining room, and women's parlor. The entirety of the first floor had a Siena marble wainscoting on the walls. The original lobby occupied much of the original hotel's 29th Street frontage; part of the lobby's original marble mosaic floor remains intact within a stairway. To the west was a parlor in the 29th Street portion of the annex, which includes a portion of its original mosaic floor and plaster ceiling. East of the original lobby was a dining room on Madison Avenue, with a paneled plaster ceiling and mosaic floor, though much of the decoration was damaged or covered up by the early 21st century. Within the middle of the dining room, the floor was removed to create a two-story space in the basement. There was another dining area south of the lobby, with ceiling moldings and mosaic floor. The dining area has a 168-square-foot (15.6 m^{2}) art glass dome that was covered in the 20th century and restored in 2005. A "Tudor room", with Gothic Revival plaster decorations on the ceiling, was located in the middle of the annex's first floor, though the ceiling has been covered up.

The basement originally housed a barber shop, men's cafe, and hair salon. The basement retains some of its original details, including marble floors and a men's cafe with wooden ceiling beams. The men's cafe was accessed from the corner of Madison Avenue and 29th Street. The annex's 28th Street entrance originally led to a Jacobean lobby in the basement with mosaic-bordered marble floors, plaster columns, a paneled low ceiling, and a niche facing the entrance. The second lobby also had a curving marble staircase with white treads and yellow walls, which ascended to the lobby.

The annex at 88 Madison Avenue includes the modern-day lobby, which was built in 2004. A set of limestone steps leads down from the sidewalk to a carpeted lobby. One side of the lobby contains a 24-foot-high (7.3 m) waterfall with a basin, backlighting, and a fabric print depicting an old photograph of the hotel. The lobby has a triple-height ceiling which leads into an adjacent restaurant space.

Part of the basement and first floor were combined in 2004 to form a double-level restaurant space next to the modern lobby, covering 7,000 square feet (650 m^{2}). The restaurant opened in 2005 as Country; the space was illuminated by crystal chandeliers on the upper level and translucent fabric cubes on the lower level. As of 2022, Hotel Seville NoMad housed an Italian restaurant named Scarpetta, as well as a cocktail lounge named the Seville; both spaces were designed by Thomas Juul-Hansen. The lounge, in the basement, was intended to resemble a Prohibition-era speakeasy. There is also a 40-foot-long (12 m) mural by Domingo Zapata near the bar's entrance. The restaurant space retains elements of the hotel's original design, such as wooden beams, as well as modern elements including a curving ceiling around the restaurant's edges. The modern-day hotel also has 5,000 square feet (460 m^{2}) of meeting space, housed within the annex.

==== Upper stories ====
Four staircases lead from the first story to the top story, of which two staircases extend to the basement. Each staircase has white marble steps, iron balustrades, and wooden handrails. There is an additional staircase in the eastern portion of the original lobby, which has marble-and-tile walls and an arched plaster ceiling. On the upper stories, there are corridors with rooms on each side; the rooms were originally accessed by wooden doors with transom windows. The guestrooms consisted of both single-room and multi-room units. Some of the single-room units had communal bathrooms, while other single-room units and all of the multi-room suites had private bathrooms. Suites could have up to five rooms, connected to each other by private hallways. There was a roof garden as well.

The modern-day hotel's upper stories are divided into 360 units, of which 28 are suites and two are penthouses. Some of the rooms in the annex, along 28th Street, face the plaza of a neighboring building. Four suites, themed to various eras of New York City's history, were added to the hotel in 2012; one of the suites had a bar and poker table hidden behind a bookcase. The rooms were decorated in blue and gray by 2025.

== History ==
In the early 19th century, the surrounding area was largely rural, with cottages and farms. New Yorkers began establishing mansions and row houses north of Madison Square Park during the mid-nineteenth century. Several churches were built nearby, including the "Little Church Around the Corner" and the Marble Collegiate Church. A commercial boom followed with the growth of hotels such as the Fifth Avenue Hotel, Gilsey House, and Grand Hotel, as well as restaurants, Broadway theaters, the second Madison Square Garden, and office buildings. The opening of the New York City Subway's first line (now the IRT Lexington Avenue Line) one block east, in 1904, spurred further development in the area. The 28th Street subway station was two blocks southeast of the intersection of Madison Avenue and 29th Street, and there were many stores and entertainment venues nearby, so the area was highly attractive to hotel developers.

=== Development ===
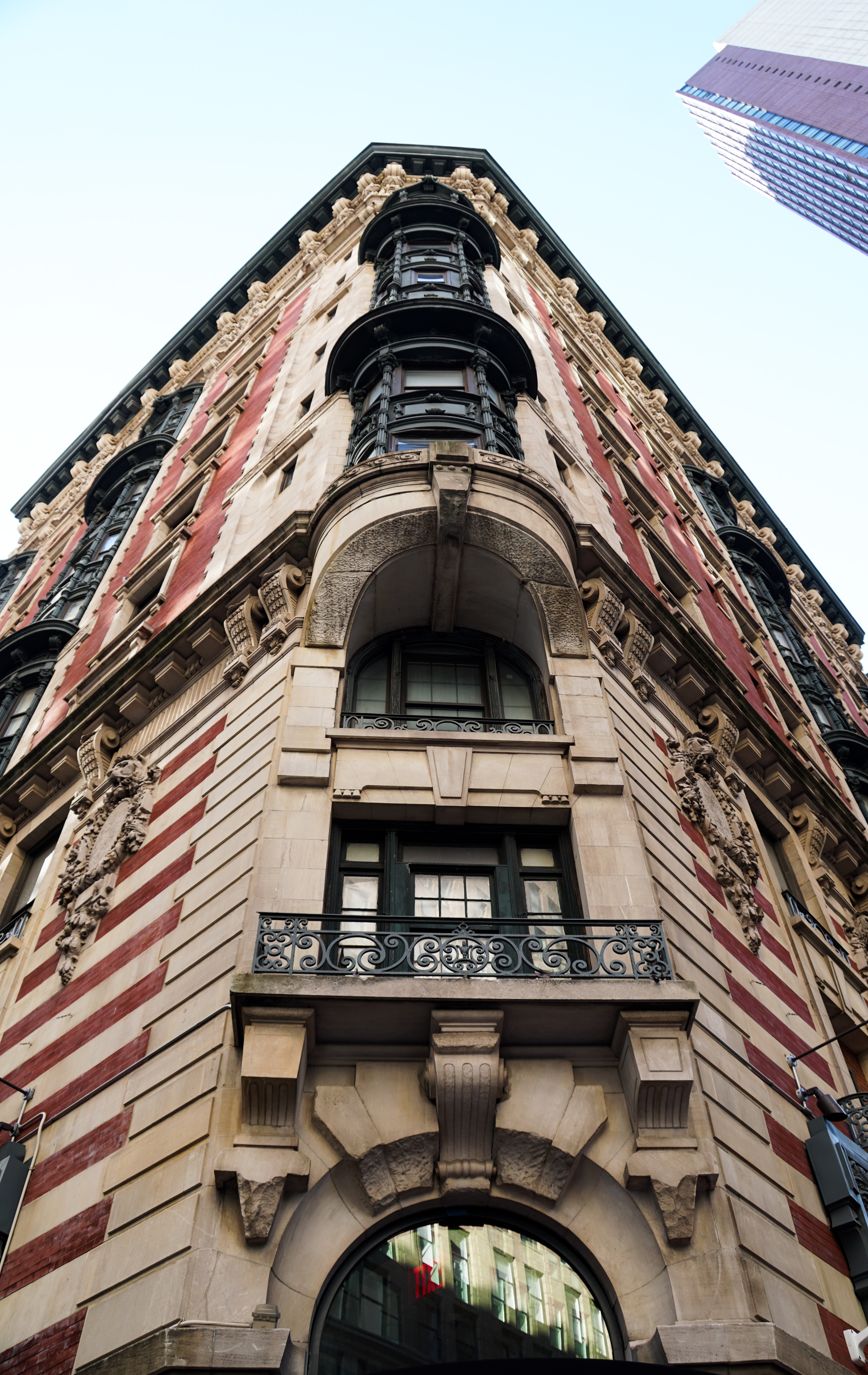
Detail of the chamfered corner on the Seville (now James New York – NoMad)

Real estate developer Myer Hellman bought the Scottish Rite Hall at Madison Avenue and 29th Street in April 1901 for $175,000. Hellman intended to erect an apartment building there. The Real Estate Record and Guide wrote at the time: "The underground road will create so much traffic between Broadway and [Park Avenue South], that there should be excuse for more activity both on Madison [Avenue] and on the side streets." Hellman quickly leased the site to Maitland E. Graves, who hired Harry Allan Jacobs to draw up plans for the hotel. Graves wanted an elaborate structure facing onto Madison Avenue, though the main entrance was relocated to the longer 29th Street frontage in the final plans. Jacobs filed plans for a 12-story apartment hotel with the New York City Department of Buildings in July 1901; at the time, the hotel was planned to cost $765,000. The structure was supposed to have 410 guest units, including 300 bathrooms. Hellman took title to the site the next month. In early 1902, the Metropolitan Life Insurance Company loaned Graves $475,000 for the hotel's construction.

The hotel was nearly completed in early 1903, when several contractors placed mechanic's liens on the property. Graves ended up owing over $65,000 to 20 contractors, prompting him to file for bankruptcy that April, and he lost the hotel to foreclosure. The hotel was sold at an auction in July 1903 to a syndicate headed by P. Henry Dugro, who paid $489,000, beating out more than 50 other bidders. The Twenty-two East Twenty-ninth Street Company was placed in charge of finishing the hotel, which was expected to cost an extra $150,000, but Drugo's partners Louis C. Raegener (Note: Sometimes spelled "Raegner") and Harold Binney bought out Drugo's stake in January 1904. At the time, the hotel was to be known as the Aberdeen, and Raegener had hired Edward Purchas as the first manager. Raegener completed the hotel, which opened as the Seville c. March 1904. (Note: The city's first subway line opened in October 1904. According to National Park Service 2005, p. 8, this was "just about seven months after the opening of the hotel", which dates the Seville's completion date to around March 1904.) The Seville was taller than many of the surrounding row houses, and its corner site drew further attention to the structure. The hotel catered to both short-term visitors and long-term residents; early advertisements described its proximity to Grand Central Depot and the Fifth Avenue shopping district. The New-York Tribune described the Seville as "in the heart of the city, but just away from the noise".

The Seville was extremely popular among visitors soon after it opened, attracting guests such as actress Mrs Patrick Campbell. Raegener leased a 200-foot-deep site next to the hotel in November 1905, and he hired Charles P. Mott, his brother-in-law, to draw up plans for a 12-story annex there. The annex was to have 19 bedrooms per floor, but Raegener could not start construction until the next year because they had to wait for an existing lease to expire. Mott filed plans for the annex with the Manhattan Bureau of Buildings in January 1906. The annex was finished in September 1907, doubling the amount of usable space in the hotel, which had 400 guestrooms and 300 bathrooms. This expansion allowed the Seville to accommodate more permanent residents as well as live-in staff members (mostly maids). In addition, the annex provided more capacity for business visitors, since business in the area was also increasing.

=== 1910s to 1950s ===
The Seville's operators acquired the neighboring four-story row houses at 86 and 88 Madison Avenue, collectively occupying a 50-by-200-foot (15 by 61 m) lot, in July 1913. The Sun reported that the houses were a "big factor to the financial success of the hotel" merely because they existed, since their presence allowed natural light and air to enter the hotel from the south. The number of short-term guests at the hotel continued to increase during the 1910s, and many patrons chose to live there year-round. The Seville's owner, Louis Raegener, also lived at the hotel with his wife for over twenty years. Advertisements for the hotel praised the structure's fireproof construction and described the nearby entertainment venues, stores, and transportation. According to an undated brochure for the Seville, the hotel was a "Modern Hotel with a homelike atmosphere..."

Raegener bought the 50-by-200-foot (15 by 61 m) land lot under the annex, at 15–17 East 28th Street and 18–20 East 29th Street, in May 1920. That December, Raegener's firm Roy Realty Company bought the 10-story apartment building at the northwest corner of Madison Avenue and 28th Street, south and east of the hotel. This gave Raegener full ownership of the western side of Madison Avenue between 28th and 29th Streets. Raegener hired Dietrich Wortmann in 1922 to replace the apartment building and the two houses on Madison Avenue with a low-rise commercial building. which would preserve the hotel's natural light exposure. After Raegener died in 1928, the executor of his estate indicated that the hotel had not made a net profit in several years. His company, the Roy Realty Company, retained ownership of the hotel. In December 1929, the Roy Realty Company leased the hotel to Jacob Wilson of the Seville Operating Corporation for 89 years.

Permanent residents and short-term guests continued to patronize the Seville after Raegener died. The Roy Realty Company continued to operate the Seville until 1946, when Roy Realty sold the hotel to the Seville Realty Corporation. The buyers also acquired the commercial building on 28th Street and Madison Avenue, around which the Seville wrapped. At the time, the hotel had 425 guestrooms, and its roof garden was still in operation. An undergarment store opened next to the Seville's lobby in 1947, and another undergarment company opened a showroom on the first floor in 1950. An investment group known as the Seville Syndicate bought the Hotel Seville in May 1955 at an assessed valuation of $800,000. The buyers also took over a $723,000 mortgage that had been placed on the hotel.

=== 1960s to 1990s ===
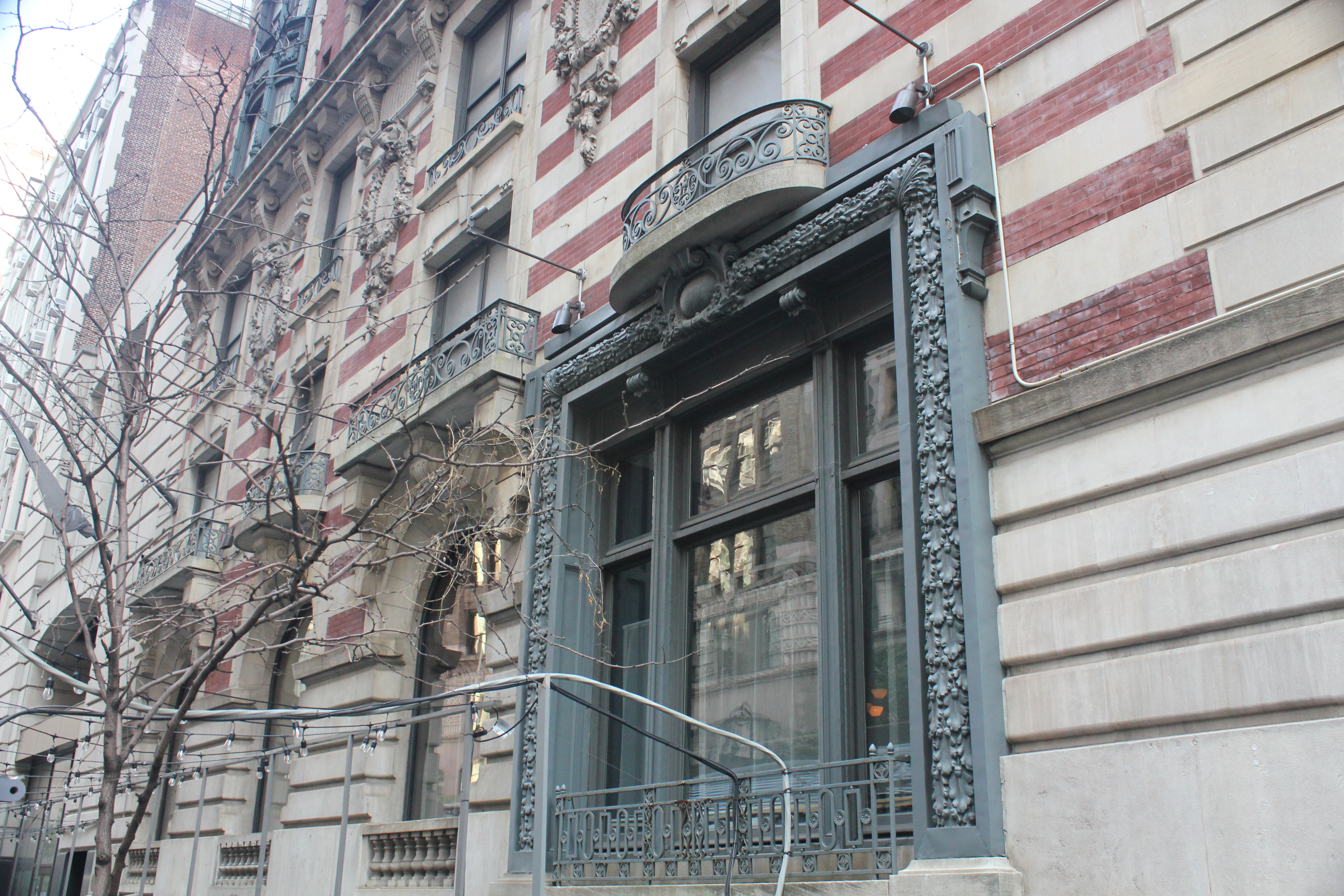
Ground-story windows on Madison Avenue

The Hotel Seville's popularity began to decline in the mid-20th century, along with that of other hotels in the neighborhood, as businesses and entertainment venues relocated uptown. The Seville remained popular with theatrical personalities who hosted their weddings there. The hotel was advertised to visitors attending the 1964 New York World's Fair. and the ground story housed an art dealer known as the Seville Galleries in the mid-1960s. One of the hotel's owners, minority shareholder Merit Koslowsky, attempted to sell the hotel in 1965, but his partners filed a lawsuit to prevent him from doing so. The Seville Syndicate ultimately sold the hotel in September 1967 to Robert Roth and Richard S. Forman of Seville Properties Inc. for $2.3 million, after the New York Court of Appeals ruled that the sale could proceed. The Seville was renovated in the mid-1970s, and the hotel underwent further upgrades in the early 1980s.

During 1985, New York University rented the top six stories of the Seville Hotel and used them as dormitories for transfer students and freshmen. The hotel had closed to visitors entirely by then, and a new owner bought the Seville and renovated the rooms. The hotel was renamed the Carlton in 1987. (Note: National Park Service 2005, p. 12, claims that the renaming happened in the 2000s, but newspapers from 1993 already described the hotel as the Carlton.) The Carlton functioned as a single room occupancy hotel with 371 rent-regulated apartments until the 1990s, Some of the Carlton's 29 remaining rent-regulated residents sued the hotel's operators in 1997, claiming that the operators were harassing them while renovating the hotel to accommodate short-term guests. As a result, the New York City Department of Buildings revoked some of the hotel's construction permits. The Wolfson family acquired the hotel in the late 1990s and began renovating it. Around the same time, the owners of the Carlton sold the site's unused air rights to the developer of a neighboring skyscraper.

=== 2000s to present ===
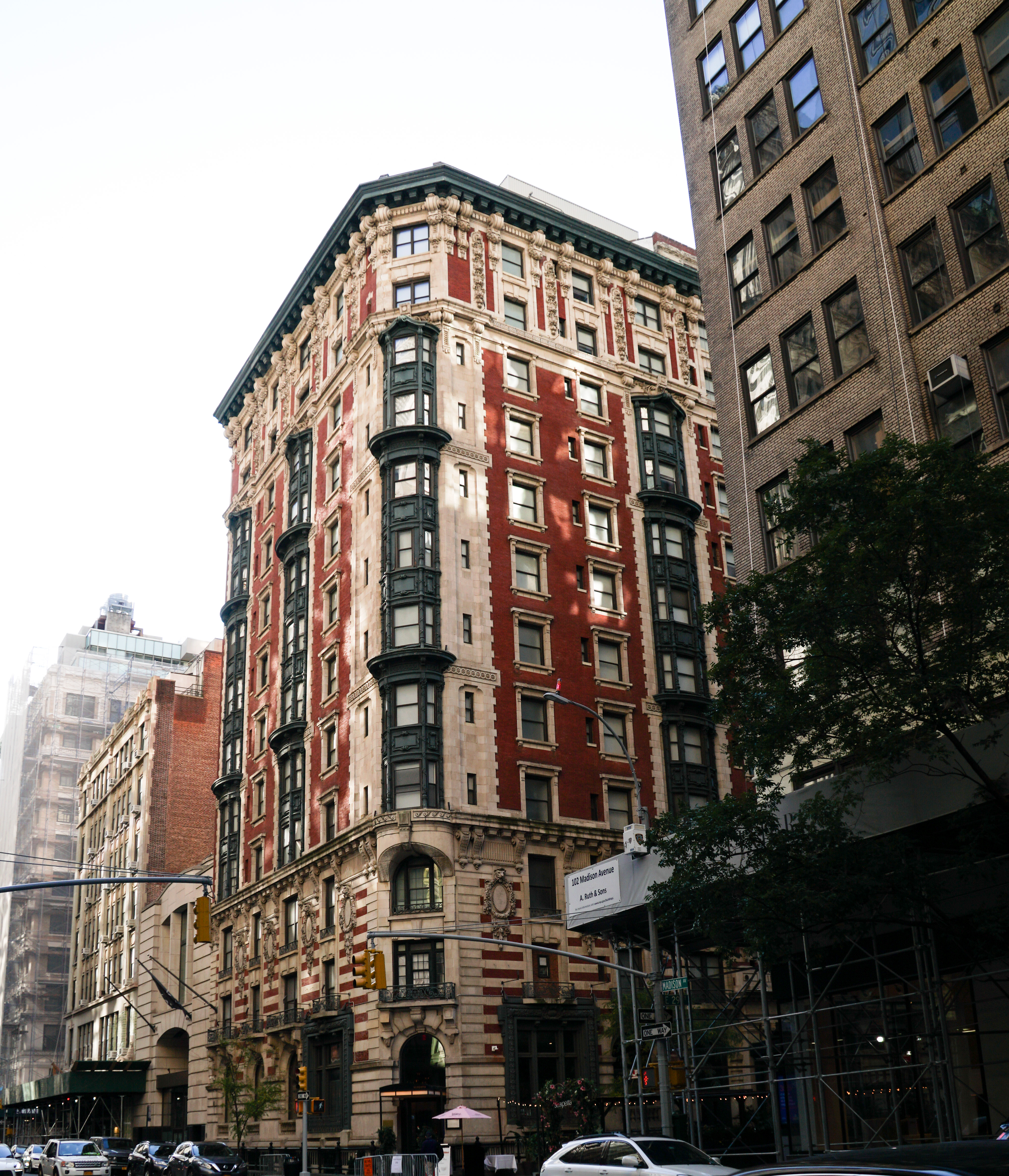
Southward view from Madison Avenue; the annex at 88 Madison Avenue can be seen at left.

Carol Bullock-Walter took over as the hotel's manager in the early 2000s and began converting it into a four-star hotel. As part of the project, a three-story annex with a new main entrance was built at 86–88 Madison Avenue, and the guest rooms were refurbished. The renovation of the guest rooms was completed in 2003. The three-story annex was completed in 2005, and the hotel's main entrance was relocated to 86–88 Madison Avenue. The Rockwell Group designed both the lobby and the hotel's restaurant, which was renovated concurrently. During the renovation, the hotel's managers rediscovered and restored the first-story bar's original glass dome, which was extremely dirty and had dozens of broken glass panes; before the renovation, no one had realized that the dome still existed, as it was hidden above a dropped ceiling. Geoffrey Zakarian agreed to operate a restaurant named Country within the ground floor of the Carlton, complementing his Town restaurant at the Chambers Hotel. The Country restaurant opened in October 2005 and was ranked by Travel + Leisure magazine as one of the world's five best new restaurants that year. The restaurant also took over the hotel's room service. The hotel had 316 rooms by the late 2000s,

The Carlton was renovated again in 2010. The Country restaurant was replaced by seafood restaurant Millesime, which opened in late 2010. The Carlton became part of Marriott International's Autograph Collection brand in early 2012, and several specialty suites opened at the hotel later the same year. The Bar Bordeaux, the first bar in New York City selling only Bordeaux wine, opened within the Carlton in 2014. In October 2015, GFI Capital Resources Group bought the Carlton from the Wolfson Group for $162.1 million. GFI borrowed $153 million to pay for the hotel. After the purchase, GFI announced in November 2016 that it would renovate the Carlton's lobby, create a 4,500-square-foot (420 m^{2}) retail space, and rebrand the hotel as the James New York – NoMad. Thomas Juul-Hansen was hired to redecorate the lower-story spaces and all the guest units. The hotel reopened in February 2018, with the Seville cocktail lounge and the Scarpetta restaurant at its base.

The New York City Landmarks Preservation Commission (LPC) hosted hearings in February 2018 to determine whether the James New York – NoMad and the nearby Emmet Building should be designated as a city landmarks. About a dozen people spoke in favor of both landmark statuses, and the buildings were designated as landmarks on March 6, 2018. During the late 2010s and early 2020s, the James New York – NoMad employed a "witch in residence", as well as services such as reiki, astrological readings, and tarot readings. GFI bought a 61 percent stake in the hotel from its partners in June 2020; at the time, Denihan Hospitality Group held a minority ownership stake. The James New York – NoMad became part of Sonesta International Hotels' The James hotel brand in early 2023. LuxUrban Hotels announced in January 2025 that it would lease the hotel for 15 years, rebranding it the J Hotel by LuxUrban. A bar called Il Bar opened at the hotel early that same year, along with a furniture store. Hyatt acquired the hotel in April 2025 and rebranded it as Hotel Seville NoMad, redesigning the interiors.

== Critical reception ==
A writer for The Austin Statesman wrote in the early 1940s that the Seville was "one of the older, conservative hotels of [the neighborhood], with high ceilings and spacious lobby". In 1983, the Boston Globe wrote: "It has spacious rooms, shabby furnishings in some of them, but luxurious marble baths in the manner of a European hotel." The same year, The Globe and Mail described the Seville as "a beautiful, carved stone building", characterizing it as a hotel "for people who prefer to stay in a neighborhood, an area where other people live and there's room to breathe".

The New York Times wrote in 2007 that the Country restaurant and "the cheer of the well-trained staff" were positive qualities but that the hotel lacked a gym or exercise room, "a glaring omission". A writer for The Daily Telegraph praised the hotel for being "elegant and formal without being stiff or old-fashioned" but criticized the lack of service and the fact that her room overlooked a brick wall. When the hotel was renovated into the James New York in the late 2010s, a writer for The Globe and Mail said: "The rooms are spacious and as well-appointed as one would expect from a hospitality group that made its name in SoHo." A reviewer for Condé Nast Traveler praised the hotel's location and public spaces, saying, "Saying a hotel has a "sense of place" is a pretty tired trope at this point, but this one really hits the mark".

The hotel building itself received mixed reviews. Brendan Gill of The New York Times wrote that the hotel building "has a restless incoherence very unlike the handiwork of either McKim or White", contrasting the building's architecture with that of structures designed by architectural firm McKim, Mead & White. When the hotel was renovated in 2007, a writer for the New Haven Register said the Wolfson family's "vision has produced stunning results throughout, but the showstopper is an original stained glass dome that illuminates the elegant dining room". Alfred and Joyce Pommer, who wrote a book about Murray Hill, Manhattan, in 2013, described the former Hotel Seville as having "altogether a robust design". The hotel building has also been shown in several TV shows, including Blue Bloods, Curb Your Enthusiasm, and Smash.

== See also ==
- List of hotels in New York City
- List of New York City Designated Landmarks in Manhattan from 14th to 59th Streets
- National Register of Historic Places listings in Manhattan from 14th to 59th Streets
