= Lionello Perera =

American banker (1871–1942)

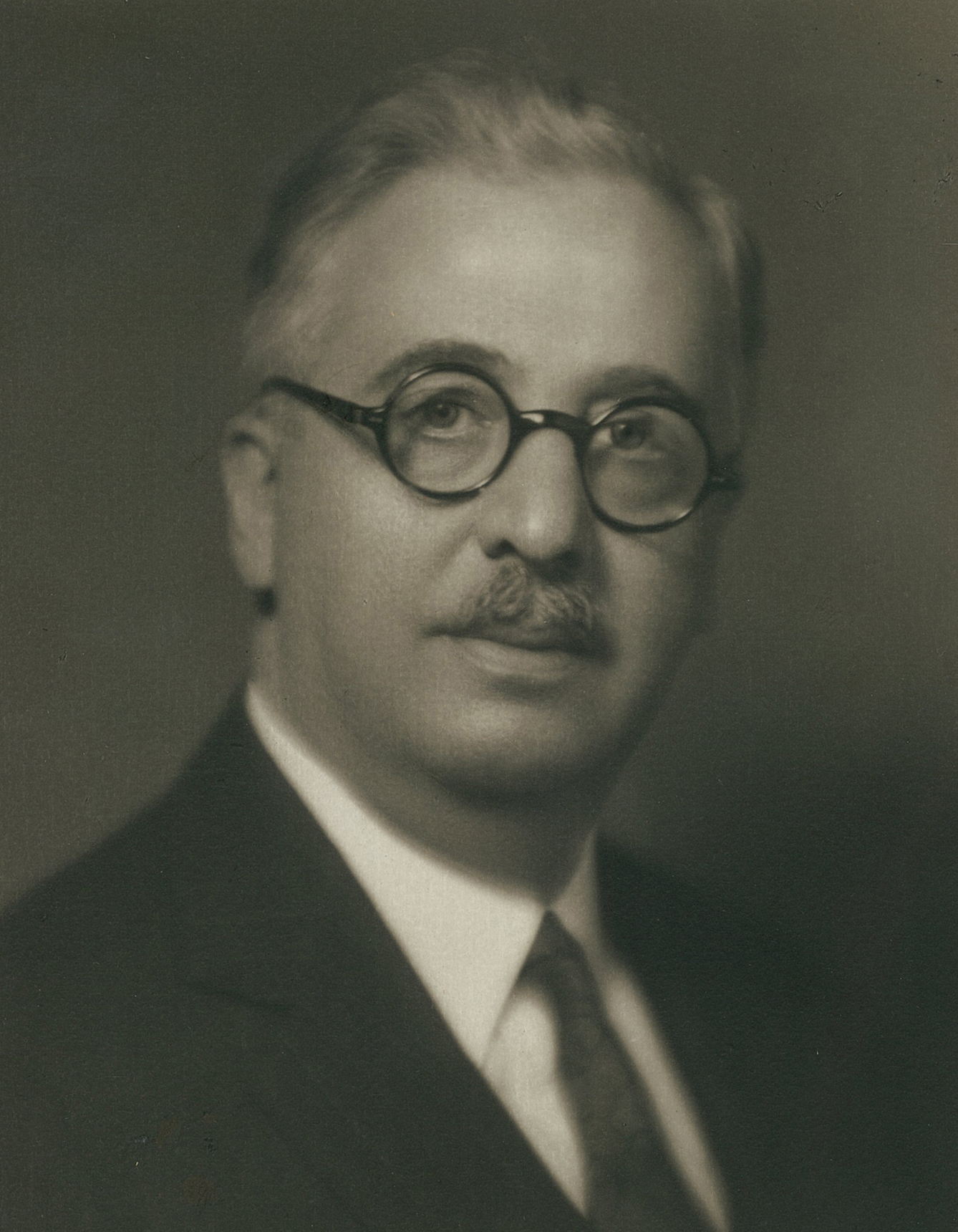
- Born: June 25, 1871; Venice, Italy
- Died: April 26, 1942 (aged 70); New York City, United States
- Education: Royal High School of Commerce, (today’s Ca' Foscari University of Venice)
- Spouse: Carolyn Allen Perera
- Parents: Cesare Lopes Perera (father); Emilia Cantoni (mother)

Lionello Arturo Lopes Perera (né Leone Arturo Perera Lopez; June 25, 1871 – April 26, 1942) was a banker, philanthropist and patron of the arts and music, active in New York at the beginning of the 20th century.

Lionello Perera was born and grew up in Venice, Italy. He studied commerce there, and then emigrated to the US at the invitation of his uncle, the banker Salvatore Cantoni. He continued his career in New York City where he participated in the foundation of Bank of America together with Amadeo Peter Giannini. Furthermore, Lionello founded and was involved in many charities which gave aid to Italian immigrants on the East Coast. He was also a passionate patron of the arts, supporting many artists and musicians including Arturo Toscanini and Gian Carlo Menotti. He helped Fiorello La Guardia run for the office of mayor of New York, leaning on his influence in the Italian American community.

== Early life (1871-1894) ==
Lionello Perera was born in Venice, Italy on June 25, 1871. His parents, Emilia Cantoni and Cesare Lopes Perera, had Jewish origins, both Sephardic and Ashkenazi. He was the fourth of six siblings and the only male among his sisters Rosa, Olga, Clara, Clelia, and Alice. Both their parents died when Lionello was still a teenager. On his parents’ death, Lionello and his sisters were entrusted to their maternal grandfather Leon Vita Cantoni, a well-known Venetian commercial agent. Between 1886 and 1889 he studied commerce at the "Regia Scuola Superiore di Commercio" (Royal High School of Commerce), today’s Ca’ Foscari University of Venice, and then started working in the financial sector.

== Business career ==
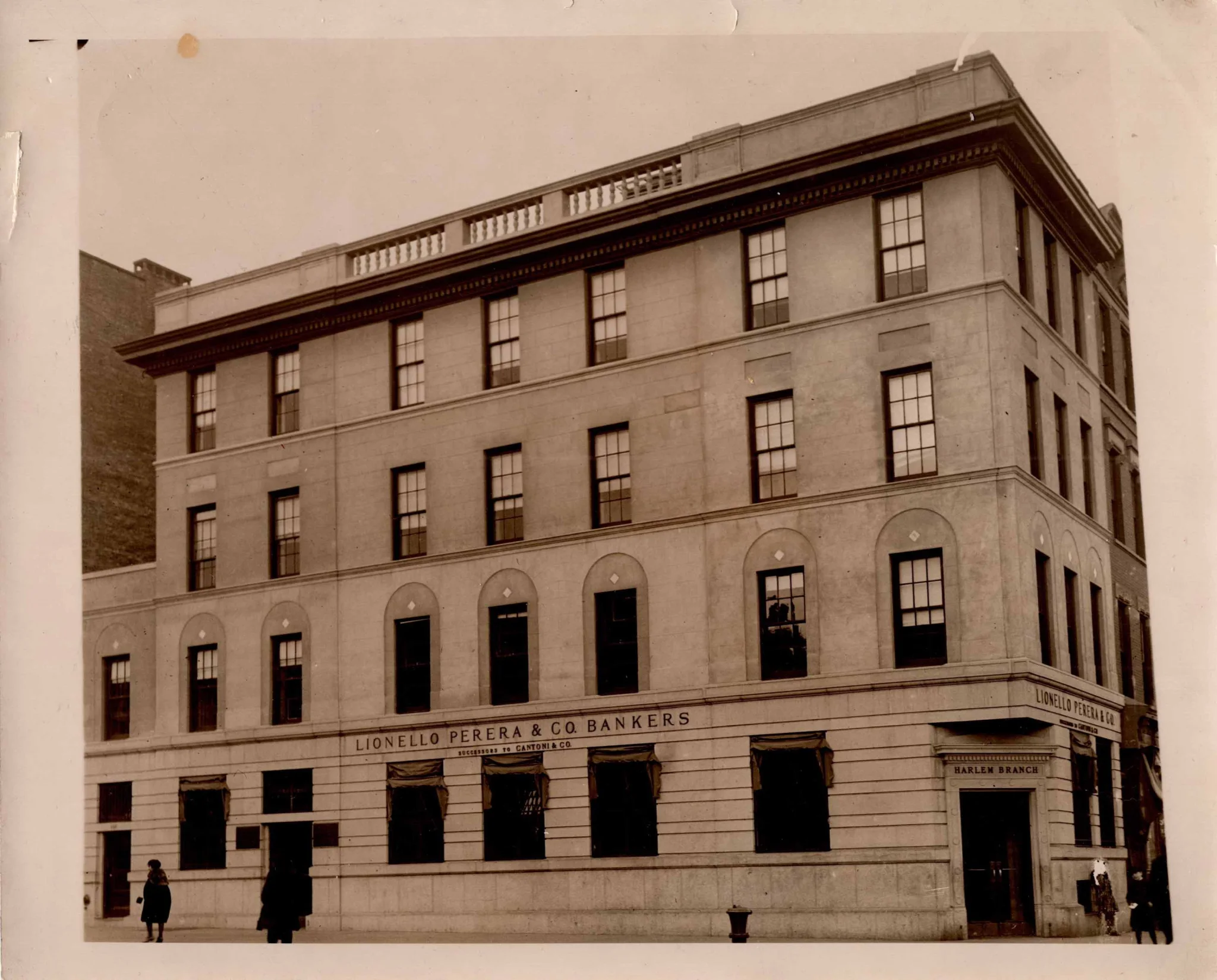
Harlem branch of Lionello Perera & Co. (1921)

=== Banca Cantoni: Salvatore Cantoni & Co. (1865-1896) ===
Shortly after his graduation, Lionello Perera emigrated to New York. He arrived at Ellis Island on board of the Kaiser Wilhelm II on April 19, 1894. In New York, his maternal uncle, the banker Salvatore Cantoni, had invited him to start working at Salvatore Cantoni & Co. His uncle’s banking business was the first Italian bank in North America and the only one to have access to the Wall Street stock exchange. Lionello Perera became essential to his uncle's business thanks to his commercial and linguistic expertise. He also quickly gained the trust of the New York Italian immigrant community.

=== Banca Perera: Lionello Perera & Co. (1896-1926) ===
After his uncle's death, Lionello Perera decided to take over his banking business. In 1896, with the help of other Jewish American investors, he purchased the majority shares and renamed the business Lionello Perera & Co. He decided to carry on with the tradition of a commercial bank specialized in money exchange, later adding various financial products such as savings, loans, safe deposits, and long-term investments. During the following three decades the bank evolved into New York’s largest savings bank, largely due to the exponential growth of Italian American customers following the increase of immigration from the Kingdom of Italy. Thanks to the professional abilities of its founder and to trust-building among the Italian American community, Lionello Perera & Co. overcame various financial crises that shaped the financial field in the USA, which at the time was characterized by a lack of regulation and had experienced several bank runs. He invested and donated considerable amounts of money to support the Kingdom of Italy, both during and after World War I.

=== Bank of America (1926-1932) ===
A bank run finally hit the Perera Bank during the 1920s with customers lining up at the counters. On February 21, 1924, many account holders came to withdraw all their savings fearing the bank’s insolvency. The panic was luckily overcome in a few days, thanks to Lionello Perera’s ability to manage the situation and accommodate the requests of all customers asking to withdraw their money, thus soon reassuring the Italian American community with regard to the bank’s solvency. This bank run in February 1924 and the increasing difficulties of the financial sector in the USA convinced Lionello Perera to start a process of acquisition and mergers that aimed at strengthening his business. He embarked on a business relationship with the Italian American banker Amadeo Peter Giannini and his brother Attilio, who were expanding their branches from California to New York. On August 31, 1926, he transformed his company into the Commercial Exchange Bank of New York, which allowed Giannini to buy shares of his banking activity and enter Wall Street for the first time. In 1927, together they bought the second largest Italian American bank in New York, Sessa Bank of Brooklyn. Eventually, in April 1928 they announced the constitution of the Bank of America National Association, the first nationwide bank of the United States, with Lionello Perera as vice president. The association broke up in 1932 and Lionello Perera's share was subject to a hostile takeover by the predecessor of today's Citibank, while Amadeo Giannini recovered his shares only years later and relaunched today's Bank of America.

== Patron and philanthropist ==
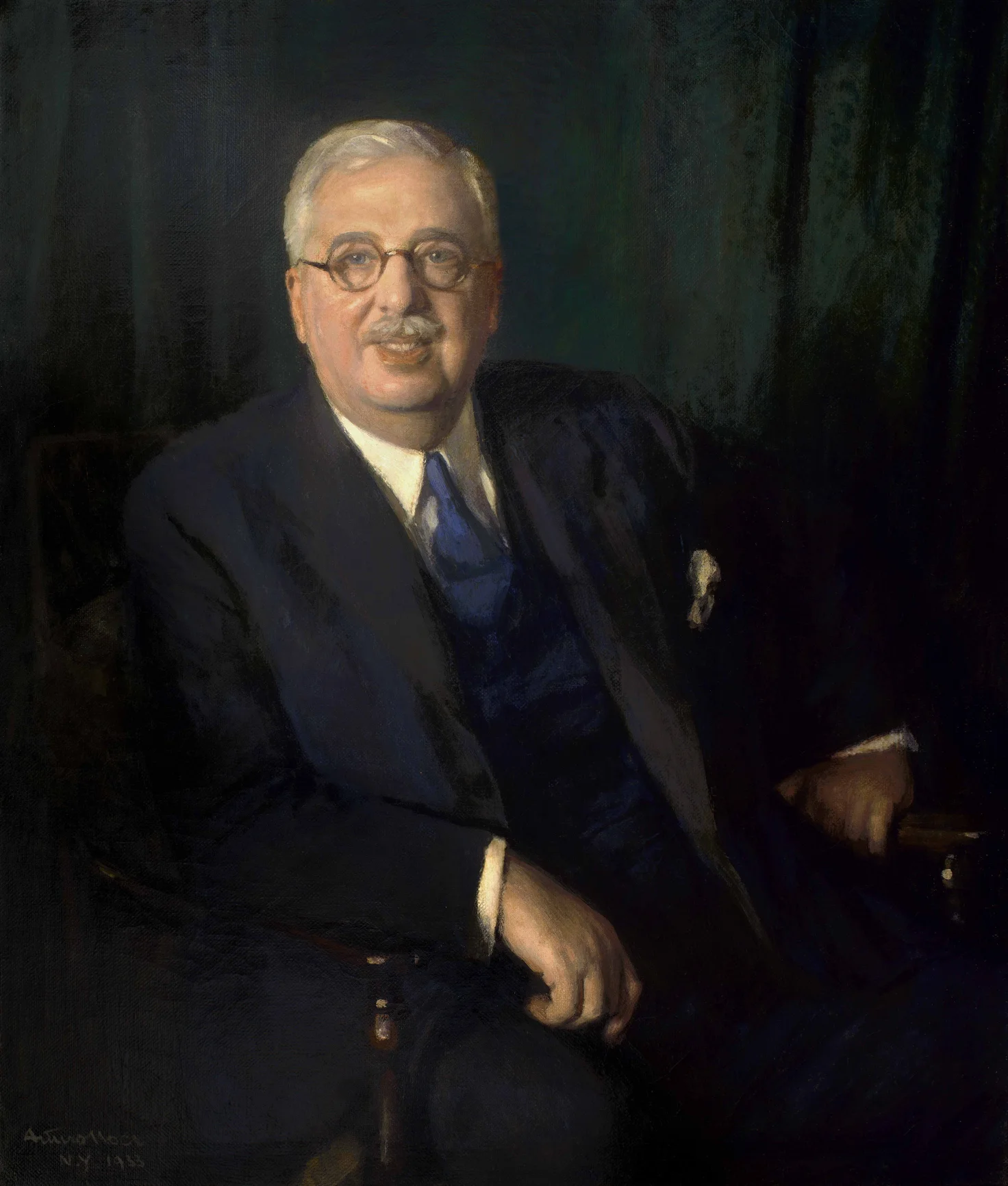
Arturo Noci, Portrait of Lionello Perera, 1933, oil on canvas. (Courtesy of the Perera Family Archive)

=== Art collector ===
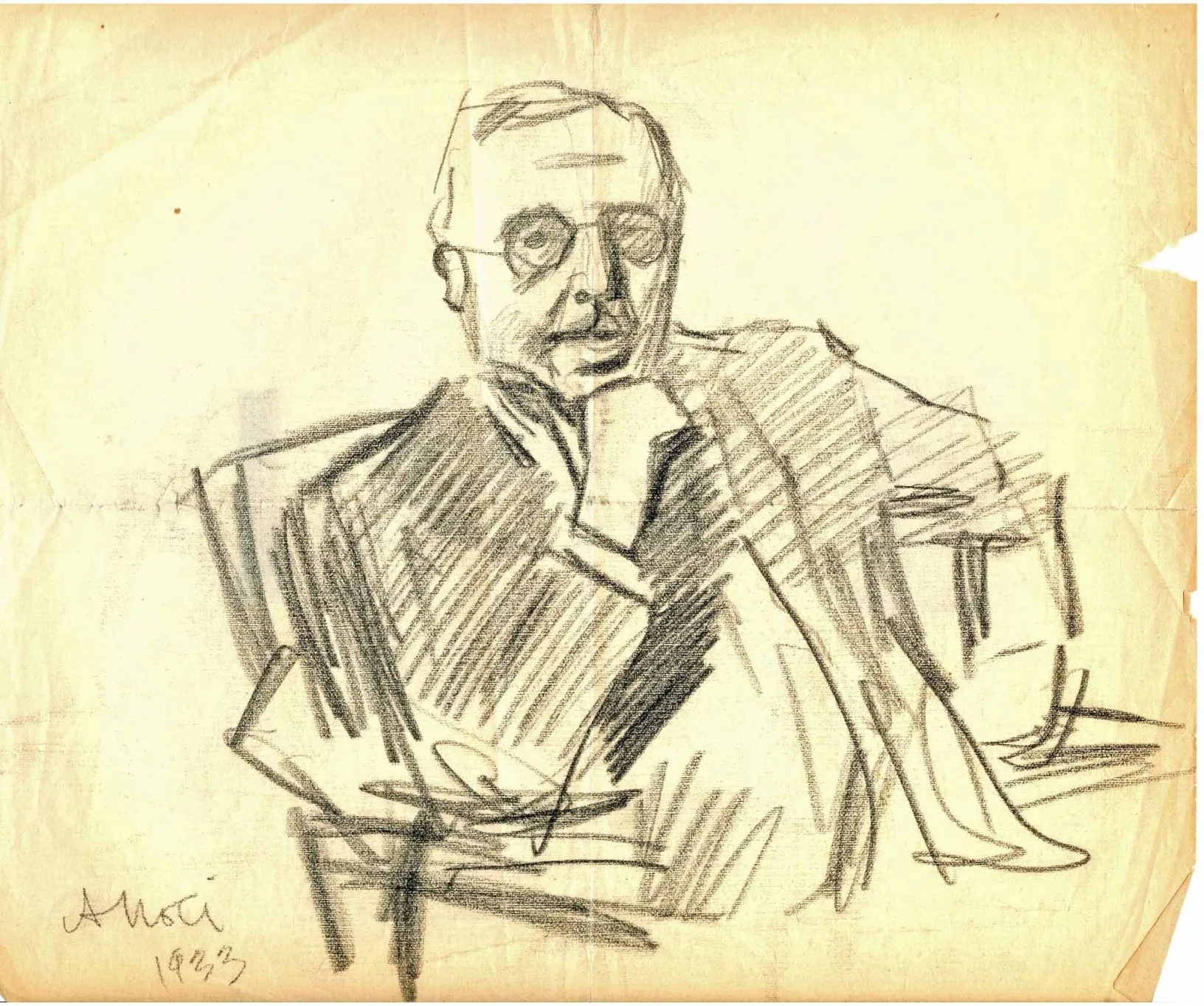
Arturo Noci, Study for the portrait of Lionello Perera, 1933

Perera was passionate about fine arts and acted as an important collector in the US with a particular attention to eighteenth century genre painting, as well as nineteenth century European Naturalism. His collection mostly consisted of Italian masters such as Pietro Longhi, Lorenzo Lotto, Arturo Noci, and Cosimo Rosselli. Lionello Perera used to draw caricatures of friends, acquaintances and people he met during his public and private life. He drew on everything that was at hand: envelopes, calendar pages, concert programs, business cards, and napkins. Among his subjects were several protagonists of American high society, politics, and the arts such as Fiorello La Guardia, Enrico Caruso, Arturo Toscanini, and E. Philips Oppenheim. Hundreds of drawings are still in the collection of the Perera family and some even at the Library of Congress, though many are dispersed since he enjoyed exchanging caricatures as was customary at the time.

=== Music patron ===
On October 17, 1904, he married Carolyn Allen, daughter of Charles Chauncey Allen and Louise Sondheim. Together they had five children: Charles Allen, Nina, Lionel Cantoni, George Alfred, and Lydia. Lionello and Carolyn shared a passion for music, in particular classical music and Italian opera. At that time opera was for Italian Americans both a means of social bonding inside their community and a good way to counter racial prejudice by emphasizing their cultural heritage.

During the 1930s the Pereras used to host private recitals and chamber music concerts in their reception room at their house, 49 East 80th Street. They invited celebrated musicians and composers like Giovanni Martinelli, Arturo Toscanini, Ildebrando Pizzetti, Gian Carlo Menotti, Béla Bartók, and Yehudi Menuhin. Their Art Deco house a rare one-family building in Manhattan, was designed by architect Harry Allan Jacobs in 1929. Lionello Perera and Carolyn Allen Perera supported the Casa Verdi in Milan, a home for retired professional musicians, which was founded by composer Giuseppe Verdi.

=== Philanthropist for the Italian Americans ===
Perera was also very active in helping Italian immigrants in New York, and further war veterans and those impacted by war or natural disasters in their home country. The earliest mention of his philanthropic activity is recorded in 1905, when, as representative of the Italian Red Cross in the United States, he sent help for the earthquake that hit southern Italy. As the Italian Delegate for the American Red Cross, he also devoted his efforts to organizing healthcare centers and services for Italian immigrants in America, through the Italian Welfare League. Thanks to his efforts he was nominated Cavaliere della Repubblica on January 24, 1909, and designated Ufficiale by the King of Italy on March 11, 1911. During World War I he directed the Italian Division of the Liberty Loan campaign. In 1934, Mayor Fiorello La Guardia appointed Lionello Perera to the New York Child Welfare Board.

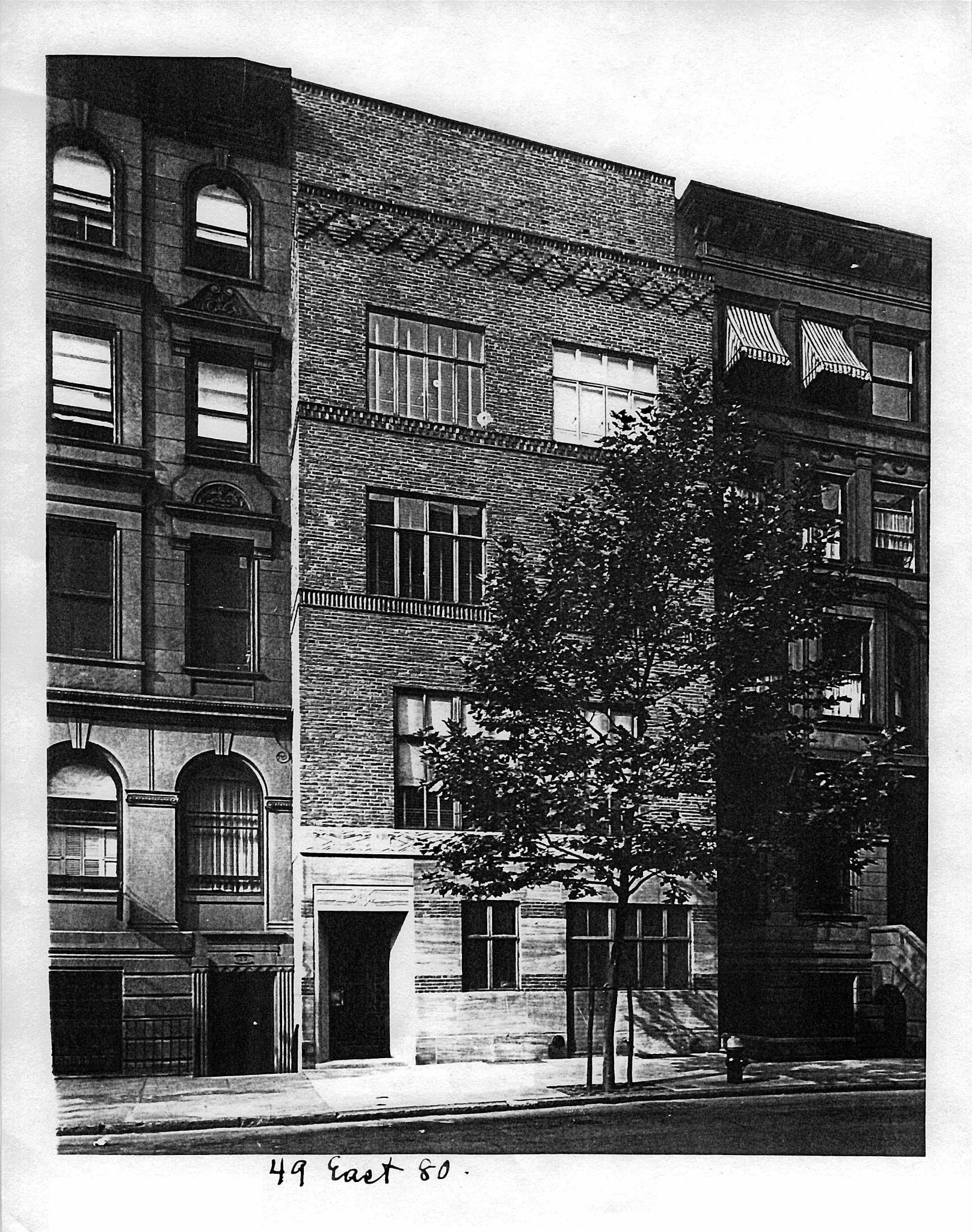
Perera Home Facade (mid 1930s)

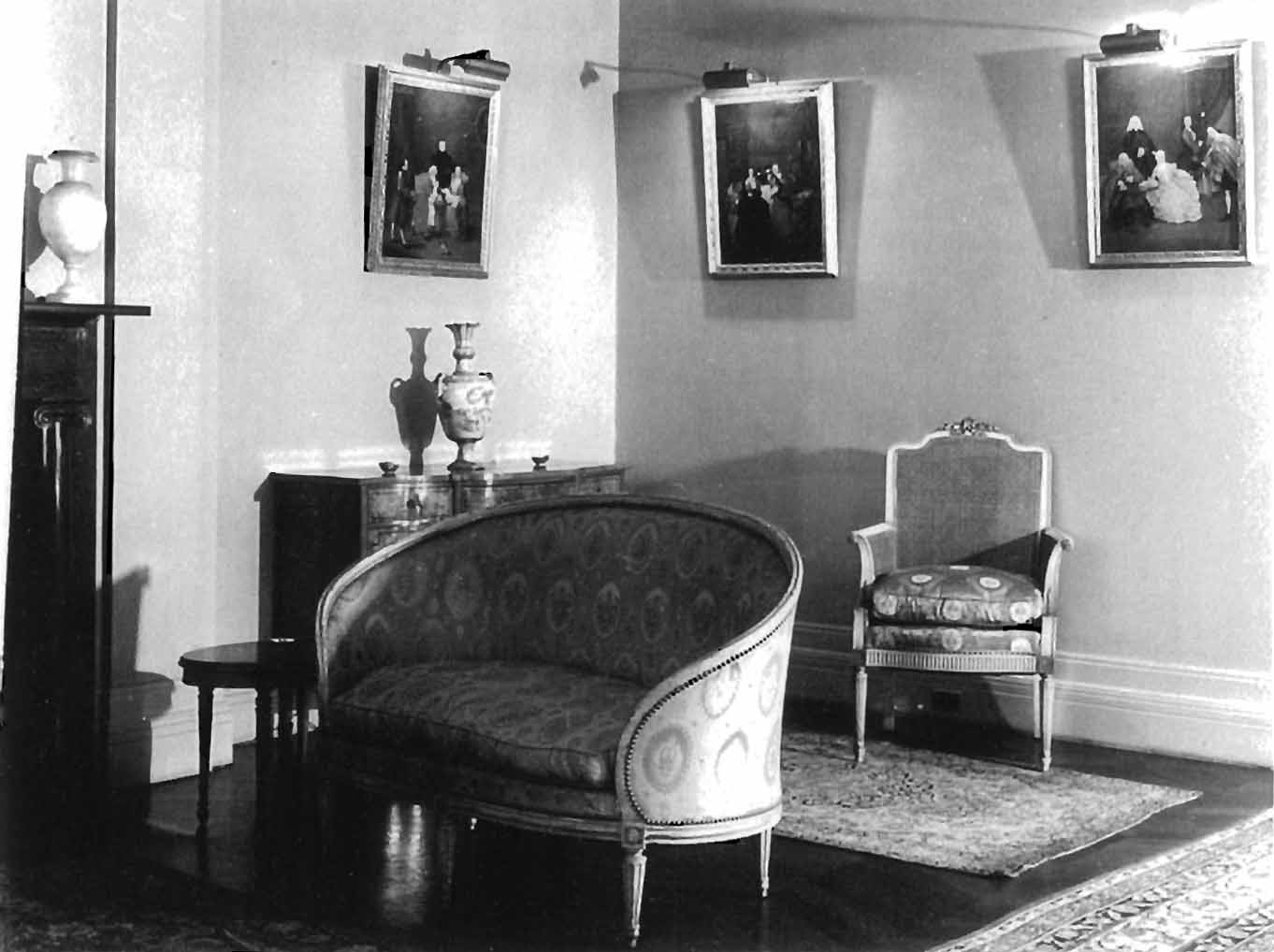
Perera Home Sitting Room (mid 1930s)

== Private life and late years ==
In July 1920 Perera was finally granted United States citizenship by naturalization, though he always felt both Italian and American. The interwar period was increasingly challenging with regard to his Italian and Jewish identity because of the complex relationship between the Fascist regime and the Italian American community, as well as due to the initial political ambiguity of the USA towards Benito Mussolini. He participated in the foundation of Casa Italiana at Columbia University, the first research center devoted to Italian heritage in a North American higher education institution. Meanwhile he tried to shift the Italian immigrant community towards supporting Fiorello La Guardia, a strenuous opponent of Nazism and Fascism. Two of his sisters, Clelia Perera Napoli and Olga Perera Pincherle, were persecuted by the Fascist regime because of their Jewish origin, and Olga died with two of her children in the Auschwitz concentration camp.

Perera died of a stroke on April 26, 1942, at Pennsylvania Station upon his return from a trip to Washington.
