= 49 East 80th Street =

House in Manhattan, New York

- House at 49 East 80th Street
- U.S. National Register of Historic Places
- New York State Register of Historic Places
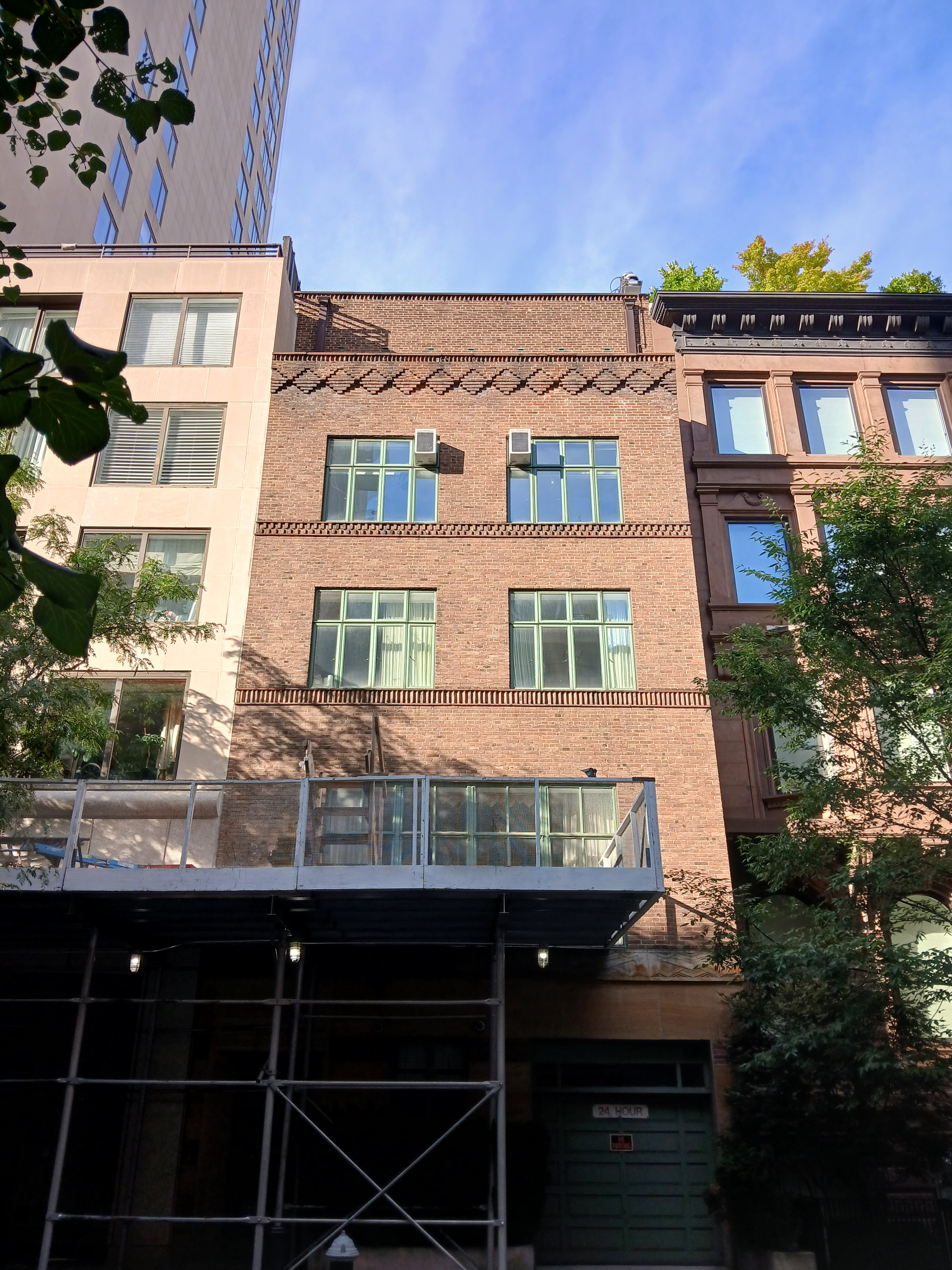
- Facade of 49 East 80th Street

- Location within Manhattan Location within New York City Location within New York Location within the United States
- Location: 49 E 80th St., Manhattan, New York, US
- Coordinates: 40°46′37″N 73°57′40″W
- Area: 2,554 ft^{2} (237.3 m^{2})
- Architect: Harry Allan Jacobs
- Architectural style: Art Deco
- NRHP reference No.: 07001193
- NYSRHP No.: 06101.016200

Significant dates
- Added to NRHP: 2007-11-15
- Designated NYSRHP: 2007-09-27

49 East 80th Street is a residence on the Upper East Side of Manhattan, New York City, United States. Designed in the Art Deco style by Harry Allan Jacobs for the banker Lionello Perera, the house was built in 1930. The main elevation of the facade is made of multi-colored stone and brick, while the rear is made of brick. The house spans five stories, plus a basement, and has five bathrooms and eight bedrooms across nearly 9,200 square feet (850 m^{2}). The house was used by banker Walter E. Sachs after Perera's death in 1942. Sachs sold the house in 1970 to singer Barbra Streisand, and it was owned by real-estate magnate Michael T. Cohen between 1980 and 2025. The house is listed on the National Register of Historic Places.

== Description ==
49 East 80th Street is on the Upper East Side of Manhattan. The building occupies a rectangular 2,554-square-foot (237.3 m^{2}) land lot on the north side of the street, with a frontage measuring 25 feet (7.6 m) wide and a depth extending 102 feet (31 m) into the block. It is one block north of the New York Society Library. The house was designed in the Art Deco style by Harry Allan Jacobs for the banker Lionello Perera.

=== Exterior ===
The main elevation of the facade, on 80th Street, is made of multi-colored stone on the ground floor and plain brick on the upper stories. The first story has a recessed entrance in its leftmost (western) bay with a metal alloy gate, decorated with low reliefs. The entrance is capped by a cast stone band with abstract zigzags, and a rhombus motif bearing the address number "49". The first story's center bay has a metal casement window, and the eastern bay has a garage door. When built, the eastern bay originally had a front kitchen space. Spanning the facade are soldier courses of bricks, laid at a diagonal with their long (stretcher) faces oriented vertically. On the second story is a single casement window, while the third and fourth stories contain two casements, each with four lights (panes). Above the windows on these stories are decorative brick courses and pyramidal corbels. The fifth story is designed as a windowless attic.

The rear elevation has a five-story brick facade. At the ground floor is a raised terrace with a French door, awning, and garden steps. The upper floors include large casement windows; the second story has one casement window with French doors, while the other stories have two casement windows apiece. These windows open onto connected fire escapes overlooking a landscaped garden.

=== Interior ===
The house spans five stories, plus a basement, and has five bathrooms and eight bedrooms. The interior covers nearly 9,200 square feet (850 m^{2}) and was described in The New York Times as having originally been decorated in a "severe" style. When built, the house had 20 rooms in total, including a raised "English basement".

The first story has an octagonal entrance vestibule with matching mirror-image terrazzo floor and plaster ceiling designs. A doorway, with a transom of leaded glass, leads to the front hall, where a curving staircase with a metal railing and an elevator lead to the upper stories. The rear of the first floor has a dining room, which contains the French doors to the garden, along with a metal Art Deco fireplace mantel with symmetrical leaf fronds. A kitchen connects with the dining room. The original kitchen was in the front of the house but has been replaced by the garage.

The second floor has a grand sitting room at the front, illuminated by the large casement window. It has decorative pilasters topped by Art Deco capitals, and a fireplace with classically-inspired paneled pilasters and abstract geometric ornamentation. The second floor also includes a rear library with paneled walls, a plaster ceiling, and a fireplace, illuminated by the casement window overlooking the garden. The bedrooms on the third and fourth stories have similar casement windows to the sitting room, and they also have decorative pilasters beneath flat architraves. The fifth floor, originally a windowless attic story, is used as a kitchen and has exposed ceiling beams and a skylight. Jacobs designed the art deco sconces and chandeliers that were installed throughout the house.

== History ==
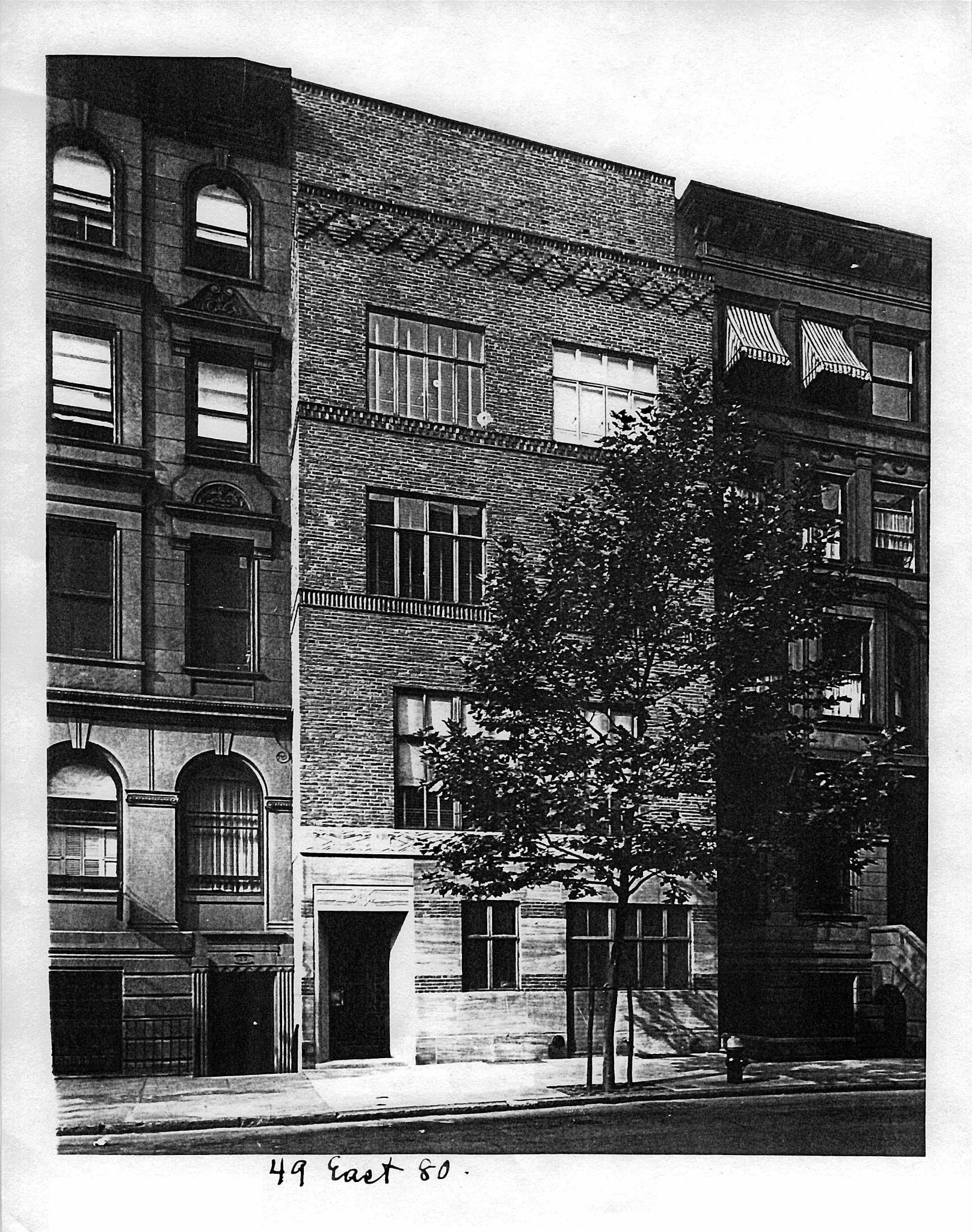
Facade (mid 1930s)

Lionello Perera (1871–1942) was an Italian-born American banker. He immigrated to the US in 1894, becoming a successful banker over the next three decades, and in 1928 his firm merged with Bank of America. The next year, Perera, his wife Carolyn, and their family hired Harry Allan Jacobs to design them a house on the Upper East Side of Manhattan. The Perera House was one of four single-family houses in Manhattan for which plans were filed with the New York City Department of Buildings in 1929; two of the other three houses were also located on 80th Street.

Carolyn was involved in many Italian cultural and welfare organizations, as well as musical groups. As such, she often hosted many events for these groups. During the Pereras' ownership, the house hosted events such as a reception for their son Lionel Jr., displays of Carolyn's spring plantings, and teatime events and receptions. Perera died in 1942, and banker Walter E. Sachs, the descendant of a founder of the banking firm Goldman Sachs, moved into the house. The house was initially leased out in 1943; it was purchased outright the next year. Sachs and his wife Mary Williamson Sachs lived in the house until they divorced, after which Mary kept the house until February 1970.

The house was sold at a foreclosure auction in January 1970 after Mary failed to make mortgage or tax payments on the property. Actress Barbra Streisand bought the house for $420,000; this amount included $295,000 for the property itself, along with back taxes. At the time, Streisand said she had been rejected for membership in two nearby housing cooperatives because of her occupation. Streisand said she "would much rather have the 17 rooms horizontally than vertically" but that she did not have much choice but to buy a multistory house. Streisand hosted a reception for US Congress member Bella Abzug, attended by 3,000 people, shortly after moving in. By May 1970, Streisand was renovating the house and looking to lease it out.

Real-estate magnate Michael T. Cohen bought the house in 1980 for $4 million. The house was listed on the National Register of Historic Places in 2007. By 2024, Cohen had listed the building for sale for $18 million; it was sold the next year for $15.9 million.

== See also ==
- Art Deco architecture of New York City
- East 80th Street Houses, another set of nearby houses on the National Register of Historic Places
- National Register of Historic Places listings in Manhattan from 59th to 110th Streets
- William Schickel House, another nearby house on the National Register of Historic Places

== Sources ==
- National Register of Historic Places Inventory/Nomination: House at 49 East 80th Street (PDF) (Report). National Park Service. 2007.
