= Harry Allan Jacobs =

American architect (1872–1932)

- Occupation: Architect
- Buildings: 22 East 29th Street, 129 East 73rd Street, Hotel Marseilles, Andrew Freedman Home, Hotel Elysée, 820 Park Avenue, New York Friars Club

Harry Allan Jacobs (1872–1932) was an American architect from New York City. He designed the Seville Hotel and Hotel Marseilles, both New York City designated landmarks, and the wings added to 1125 Grand Concourse (Andrew Freedman Home).

Jacobs was born and raised in New York City. He trained to be an architect at the Columbia School of Mines graduating in 1894 and continued his studies in Paris at the Ecole des Beaux Arts. He won the Prix de Rome.

Jacobs redesigned the house at 26 West 56th Street in Midtown Manhattan for Henry Seligman in 1907. He designed several residential buildings in what is now the Upper East Side Historic District including an Italian Renaissance Revival style residence for Charles Guggenheimer at 129 East 73rd Street (1907). He designed a new façade for philanthropist R. Fulton Cutting's home at 22 East 67th Street (1908) and a residence for theater producer Martin Beck at 13 East 6th Street (1921) Jacobs also designed the Andrew Freedman Home (1925) at 1125 Grand Concourse in the Bronx with Joseph H. Freedlander. He designed the Hotel Elysee at 54-60 East 54th Street in 1927. He designed a residential building that included the home of publisher Andrew J. Kobler at 820 Park Avenue (1926). He also designed the original New York Friars Club building. In 1930, he designed a house at 49 East 80th Street for banker Lionello Perera.

His son Robert Allan Jacobs was also an architect and worked in partnership with Ely Jacques Kahn.

A collection of his photographs are held by the Columbia University libraries.

== Work ==
- Hotel Marseilles, a New York City Landmark
- James New York - NoMad, a New York City Landmark
- Original Friars Club building in New York City
