= No Longer Empty =

US non-profit organization

No Longer Empty was a New York City-based, 501(c)(3) nonprofit arts organization dedicated to orchestrating site-specific public art exhibitions in empty storefronts. No Longer Empty was conceived as an artistic response to the worsening economic condition in 2009, and its effect on both the urban landscape and the national psyche. It has since then expanded its mission to create a more lasting effect on the community through a series of programs that consist of panel discussions, art workshops, art tours and outreach and collaborations with the local community.

No Longer Empty ceased programming in July 2020 due to the COVID-19 pandemic.

No Longer Empty's first exhibition was a series of installations at two storefronts adjacent to the Hotel Chelsea. Established and emerging artists, including five Hotel Chelsea resident artists, responded to the space and its history, creating site-specific works. Since then, No Longer Empty has organized ten exhibitions in New York City, including the Andrew Freedman Home. With its exhibitions and programming, No Longer Empty attempts to synthesize the contemporary art world and the values of community building.

Members of the advisory board include artist Scherezade García.
