= Andrew Freedman =

American businessman and baseball franchise owner (1860–1915)

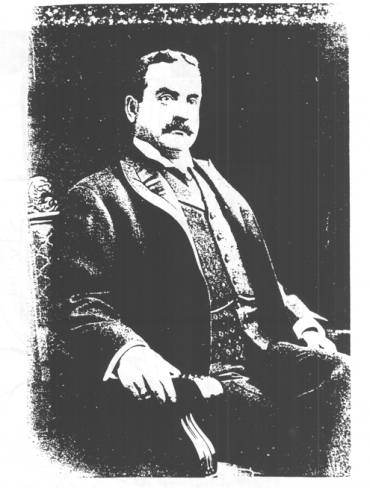
- Born: September 1, 1860; New York City, New York, U.S.
- Died: December 4, 1915 (aged 55); New York City, New York, U.S.
- Occupations: Owner of the New York Giants (1895–1902); Owner of the Baltimore Orioles (1902); Director of the Interborough Rapid Transit Company; Director of the Wright Company

Andrew Freedman (September 1, 1860 – December 4, 1915) was an American businessman who is primarily remembered as the owner of the New York Giants professional baseball team of the National League from 1895 to 1902. He also briefly owned the Baltimore Orioles of the American League in 1902; the franchise would later relocate, and became the New York Yankees. Freedman was also a director of various companies, including the Interborough Rapid Transit Company and the Wright Company. He was born and died in New York City.

== Biography ==
Andrew Freedman was born in New York City on September 1, 1860; his family were middle-class German-Jewish immigrants. He attended Grammar School No. 35, a public school in Lower Manhattan, and City College of New York.

=== Baseball ===
In 1895, Freedman became the principal owner of the New York Giants of the National League (NL), purchasing a controlling interest in the club from Cornelius C. Van Cott for approximately $53,000 ($2,051,100 in current dollar terms). During his ownership of the team, Freedman drew the ire of many of his players for various fines and abuses. In one incident, star pitcher Amos Rusie sat out the entire 1896 season during a feud with Freedman. NL presidential candidate Al Spalding called Freedman an "impossibility in baseball", demanding that Freedman retire from the game. Freedman refused.

With the financial backing of John T. Brush, principal owner of the Cincinnati Reds, Freedman purchased controlling interest in the Baltimore Orioles of the rival American League (AL) on July 17, 1902. The Orioles were in significant debt, reportedly owing $12,000 ($446,538 in current dollar terms). As a result, part-owner and team president John Mahon purchased shares in the team from players John McGraw, Joe Kelley, and Wilbert Robinson, becoming principal shareholder of the Orioles. Mahon, with the controlling interest in the Orioles, comprising 201 of the team's 400 total shares, sold his shares to Freedman. Upon taking control of the franchise, Freedman released the Orioles' best players from their contracts so that they could be signed by NL teams: Kelley and Cy Seymour signed with the Reds, while Joe McGinnity, John McGraw, Roger Bresnahan, Dan McGann, and Jack Cronin signed with the Giants. American League president Ban Johnson, along with minority owners of the Orioles, took control of the Orioles franchise, which had to forfeit their game that day as they did not have enough players. The Orioles relocated to New York City in 1903 and were renamed the Highlanders; since 1913, the franchise has been the New York Yankees.

At the end of September 1902, Freedman sold the Giants to Brush.

=== Other interests ===
Freedman took over the Manhattan Athletic Club, which fell into receivership in 1893, as its receiver.

He was a director of the Interborough Rapid Transit Company (IRT). He first became involved in IRT when John B. McDonald sought to include Freedman. Freedman reported that he invested $1.7 million ($63,259,615 in current dollar terms) in the company in 1901 and 1902. He also served on the board of directors of the Wright Company, established in 1909 to market the Wright brothers' airplanes in the United States.

Freedman owned an ice yacht, named "Haze", which won a pennant race in North Shrewsbury, New Jersey.

=== Death and estate ===
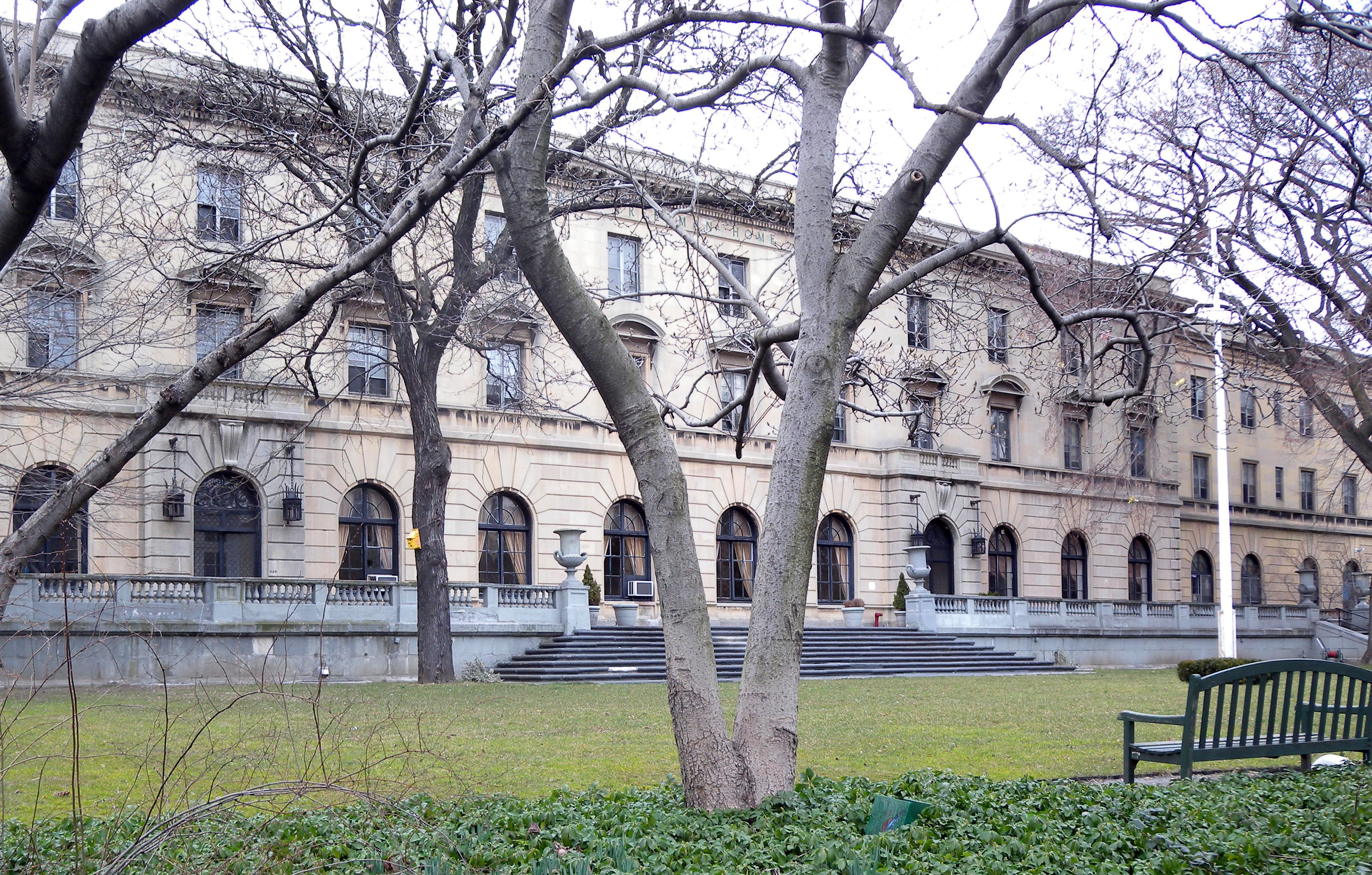
The Andrew Freedman Home

Freedman died in New York City on December 4, 1915, following a nervous breakdown. He was unmarried. His estate was worth over $4 million ($127,302,632 in current dollar terms). Samuel Untermyer served as executor of the estate.

In his will, Freedman bequeathed money to build the Andrew Freedman Home at 1125 Grand Concourse in The Bronx. The home was initially intended to serve as a retirement home specifically for wealthy people who lost their fortunes. Plans were filed in 1922 to build the home as a four-story brick building, with the cost of construction estimated at $500,000 ($9,617,296 in current dollar terms). The building cost approximately $1 million ($18,786,408 in current dollar terms) and opened in 1924. The Andrew Freedman Home was named a New York City Designated Landmark in 1992.
