= Andrew Freedman Home =

Historic building in the Bronx, New York

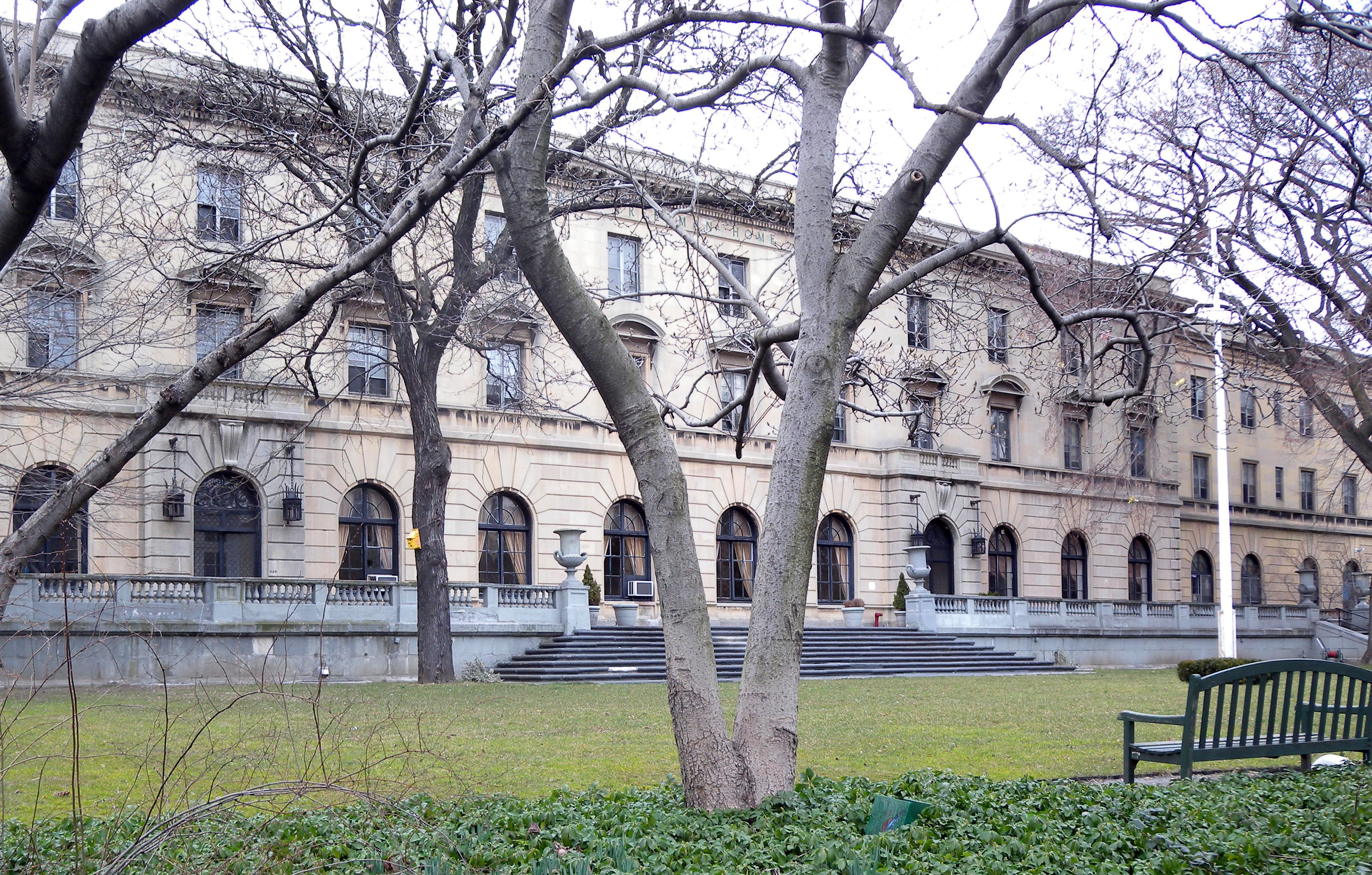

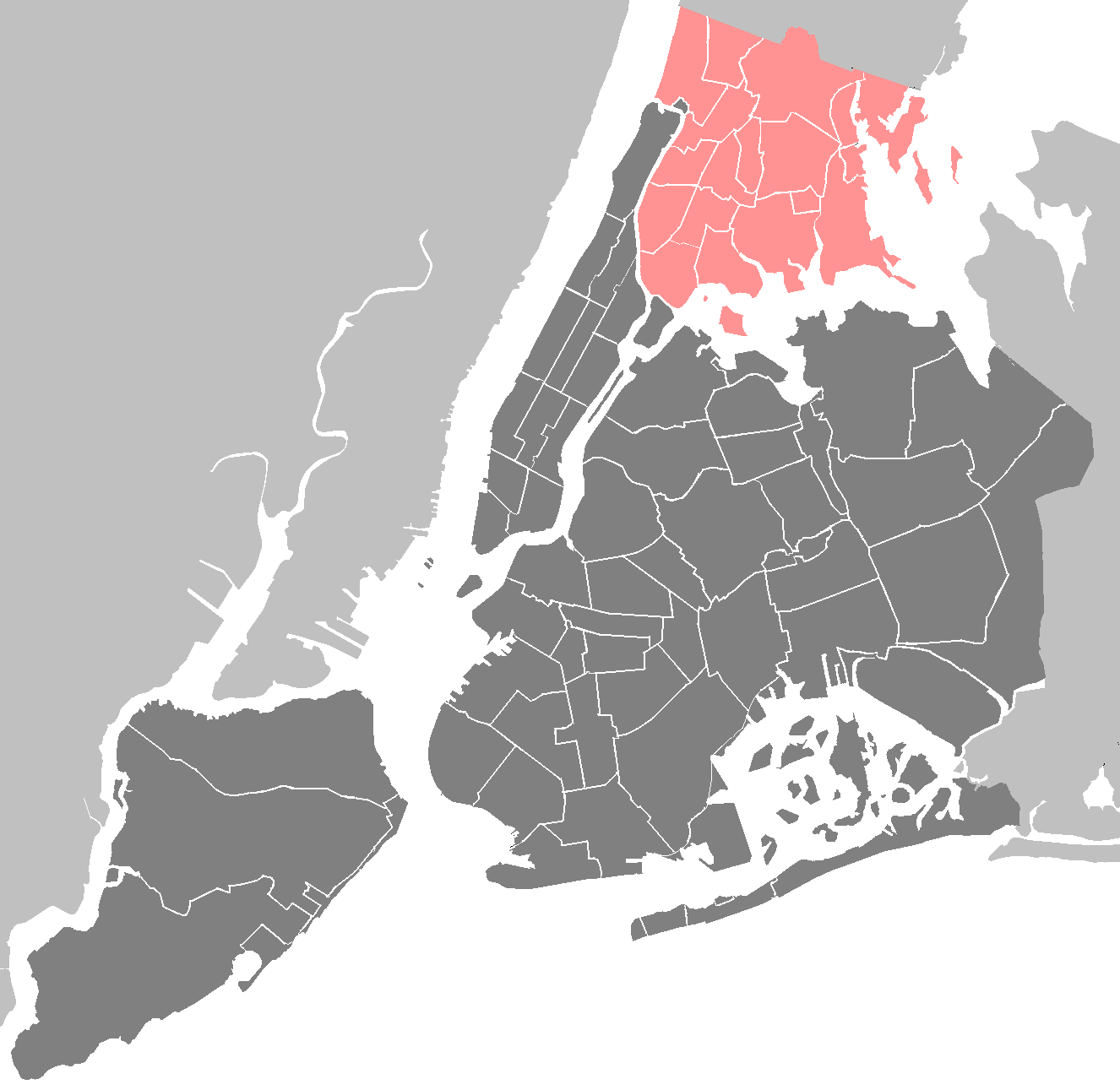
- Location within Bronx

General information
- Type: House
- Location: 1125 Grand Concourse; The Bronx, New York
- Coordinates: 40.832742°N 73.920142°W
- Construction started: 1924

Design and construction
- Architect: Friedlander Jacobs

The Andrew Freedman Home is a historic building in the Bronx, New York City. Constructed by the estate of the millionaire Andrew Freedman, it has been renovated into an artists' hub consisting of an interdisciplinary artist residency, an incubator space, workforce development and community services. It is a New York City designated landmark. The money to build it was bequeathed by Freedman. Located at 1125 Grand Concourse in the Concourse neighborhood, the Andrew Freedman Home was designed as a retirement home for wealthy individuals who had lost their fortunes.

The trust that operated the Andrew Freedman Home ran out of money in the 1960s. The home was reopened in 1983 for all elderly individuals, regardless of past financial status. As of 2012, the Andrew Freedman Home serves as a day-care center and event space.

== Background ==
During the Panic of 1907, Andrew Freedman, a self-made millionaire, came to the realization that he almost lost his entire fortune. He feared what would have happened to him in his later life without his wealth. As a result, he developed the idea of a charitable trust to build a home for older individuals who had lost their fortunes, where they could live in their retirements.

When Freedman died in 1915, his estate was worth over $4 million ($127,300,000 in current dollar terms). Samuel Untermyer served as executor of his estate.

In his will, Freedman bequeathed money to build the Andrew Freedman Home at 1125 Grand Concourse in The Bronx. The home was intended to serve as a retirement home for "aged and indigent persons of both sexes", who had formerly been of "good circumstances" financially. Each resident lived at the Andrew Freedman Home rent free, and received free servants.

== Construction ==
Plans were filed in 1922 to build the home as a four-story brick building. Untermeyer purchased the plot of land on Grand Concourse. Architects Joseph H. Friedlander and Harry Allan Jacobs estimated the cost of construction at $500,000 ($9,617,296 in current dollar terms). The Home was built as a four-story building in a French and Italian Renaissance style with soft gray and yellow limestone. The building cost approximately $1 million ($18,790,000 in current dollar terms) to build.

The Andrew Freedman Home opened in 1924. The building was expanded between 1928 and 1931, adding two new wings. The building included formal English gardens, a well-manicured lawn, and public rooms with fireplaces and oriental rugs. Each private residence contained a white marble shower stall.

== Retirement home ==
The Home could accommodate 130 residents at a time. Although the first guests to move into the Home did not have the intended cultural background, many wealthy individuals who lost their fortunes in the Wall Street Crash of 1929 moved into the Home in the 1930s. After World War II, various Jews of European descent moved into the home.

At dinner, formal dress was a requirement. People were forbidden to sleep on couches or put their feet on the furniture in the public areas.

Just as with its beneficiaries, the trust's money ran low by the 1960s. By 1965, residents were required to pay rent. People began to move out of the Home as the area around Grand Concourse declined.

== Recent developments ==
The Mid Bronx Senior Citizens Council purchased the home in 1982, and relocated the remaining 30 residents. They reopened the Home in 1983 as a residence for the elderly and poor.

The Andrew Freedman Home was named a New York City Designated Landmark in 1992.

As of 2012, the Andrew Freedman Home serves as a daycare center and event space. On April 4, 2012 No Longer Empty opened "This Side of Paradise", an exhibition of artworks in various mediums including photography, video projections and installations. Artists such as photographer Sylvia Plachy and graffiti artist Daze showed work relating to the history of the Home and addressing themes like immigration and memory.

Since "This Side of Paradise", Andrew Freedman Home Director Walter Puryear has offered an Artist In Residency program. Resident Artists have included DJ Kool Herc, Aaron Lazansky, Melissa Calderón, fiber artist Valarie Irizarry, and Josue Guarionex. AFH | AIR artists are awarded studio space and participate in group exhibitions in the Home's galleries. Artists offer workshops to the local Bronx community, exchanging 20 hours of labor per month for AIR benefits. Workshops are low-cost or free-of-charge and include art-making and music lessons, such as Afro-Puerto Rican drum classes offered by Jose "Dr. Drum" Ortiz.

Current AFH | AIR resident artist and organizations include Renée Cox, En Foco, Jennie West and Meguru Yamaguchi.

Andrew Freedman Home exhibits art regularly in its galleries and as installations throughout the building and grounds. Bronx Voyeurs featured works by artist Emory Douglas and others in a multichannel video installation in windows of the Home, curated by Walter Puryear and designed by Benton C Bainbridge. Interactive exhibit Undesign the Redline examined the social effects of urban planning in a series of participatory displays.

In Fall, 2017, a three-venue exhibition between Andrew Freedman Home, BronxArtSpace and Swing Space opened, featuring Incarcerated Nation, Noté Peter George, Solitary Watch, Hank Willis Thomas, Julia Justo, and dozens of other organizations and artists. STATE PROPERTY is a multi-disciplinary examination of American consumerism of prison labor and our daily choices to purchase, condone or reject goods created in penitentiaries.
