= Hotel Marseilles =

Residential building in Manhattan, New York

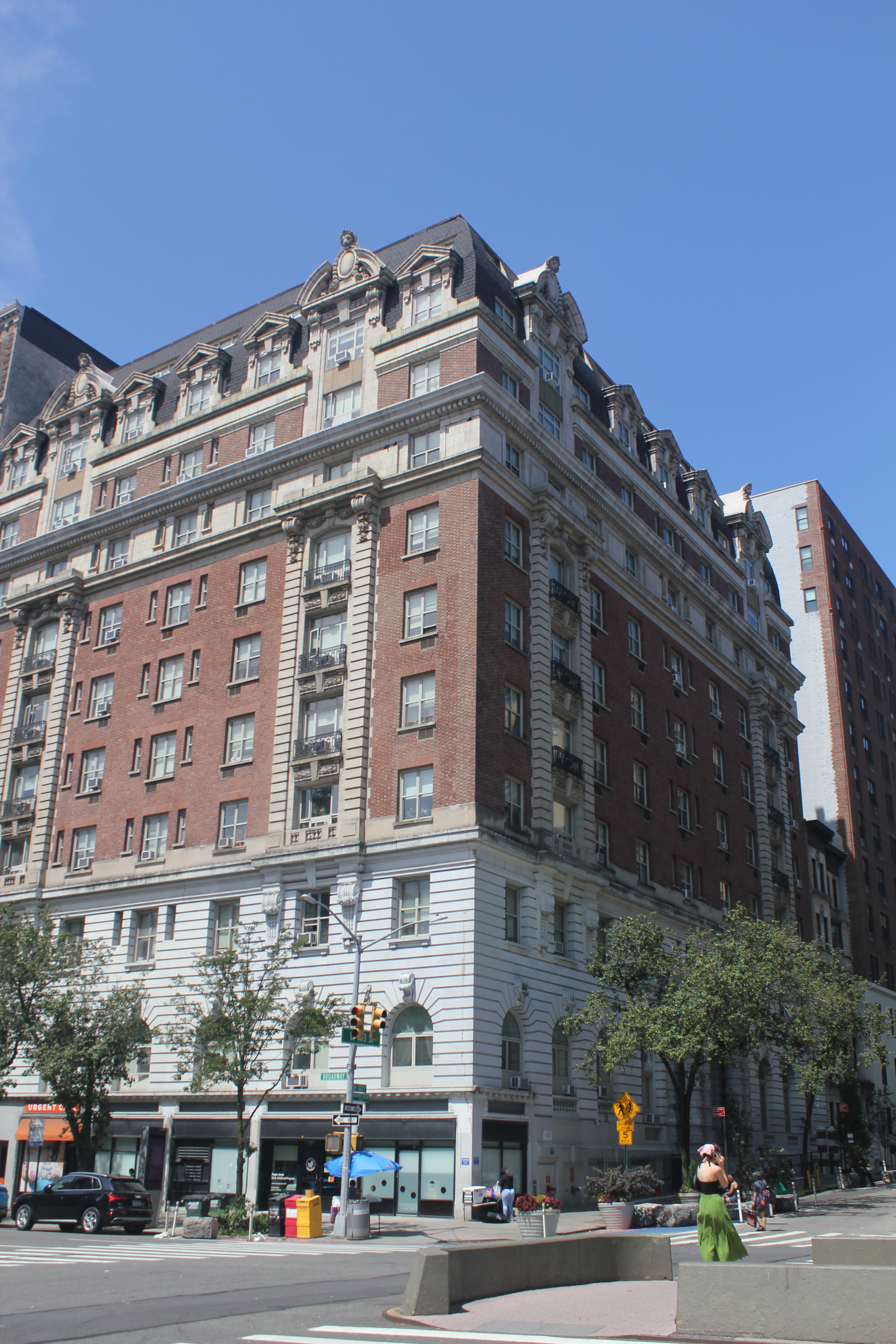
- Interactive map of the Hotel Marseilles area

General information
- Architectural style: Beaux-Arts
- Location: 2689–2693 Broadway, New York, NY, 10025, United States
- Coordinates: 40°47′57″N 73°58′09″W
- Construction started: 1902
- Opening: October 1905
- Owner: Marseilles LLC

Technical details
- Floor count: 11

Design and construction
- Architect: Harry Allan Jacobs
- Developer: J. Arthur Pinchbeck

Other information
- Number of units: 134

New York City Landmark
- Designated: October 2, 1990
- Reference no.: 1660

The Hotel Marseilles (also known as the Marseilles) is a residential building at 2689–2693 Broadway, on the corner with West 103rd Street, on the Upper West Side of Manhattan in New York City. Constructed between 1902 and 1905 as one of several apartment hotels along Broadway on the Upper West Side, the Marseilles was designed by architect Harry Allan Jacobs in the Beaux-Arts style. The building is a New York City designated landmark.

The building is 11 stories tall. Its facade is largely made of red brick and stone, with ornamentation made of architectural terracotta and wrought iron. The limestone base is three stories high and contains a main entrance on 103rd Street; the building also contains an interior light court facing south. The structure is topped by a two-story mansard roof with asphalt tiles. When the Marseilles operated as a hotel, it contained several dining rooms and other spaces for guests. The upper stories were arranged into more than 250 guestrooms, which have since been converted into 134 apartments for the elderly.

The Marseilles was developed by J. Arthur Pinchbeck, whose Netherlands Construction Company developed the structure as an apartment hotel. The hotel was completed in October 1905 and was originally operated by Louis Lukes before being resold several times in the 20th century. The ground-story rooms were replaced with shops in the 1920s. The structure contained a refugee center for Holocaust survivors in the 1940s, and the Marseilles became a single room occupancy hotel in the late 20th century. Two attempts to convert the building into affordable housing for elderly people failed in the 1960s and 1970s. The West Side Federation for Senior Housing sponsored a third, successful conversion, which was completed in 1980.

== Site ==
The Marseilles is located at 2689–2693 Broadway, at the southwest corner with 103rd Street, on the Upper West Side of Manhattan in New York City. It occupies the eastern end of the city block bounded by Broadway to the east, 103rd Street to the north, West End Avenue to the west, and 102nd Street to the south. The hotel has an alternate address of 2693 Broadway. The rectangular land lot covers 12,110 ft^{2} (1,125 m^{2}), with a frontage of about 101 feet (31 m) on Broadway and 120 feet (37 m) on 103rd Street. Nearby buildings include the Master Apartments two blocks west, the Horn & Hardart Building one block north, and the Association Residence Nursing Home one block east. In addition, an entrance to the New York City Subway's 103rd Street station is immediately across 103rd Street from the building.

Before European colonization of modern-day New York City, the site was part of the hunting grounds of the Wecquaesgeek Native American tribe. After the British established the Province of New York, the area became part of the land holdings of Isaac Bedlow in the late 1660s; he owned the land on what is now the west side of Manhattan from 89th to 107th streets. Humphrey Jones acquired the land between 99th and 107th streets in 1752. While the Manhattan street grid was laid out as part of the Commissioners' Plan of 1811, the neighborhood remained undeveloped through the late 19th century. The sites on Broadway's western sidewalks from 89th to 109th streets were still vacant as late as the 1890s.

== Architecture ==
The Hotel Marseilles was designed by Harry Allan Jacobs and is one of multiple apartment hotels on Broadway designed in the Beaux-Arts style. The building is 11 stories high and is U-shaped, with a light court on its southern side.

=== Facade ===
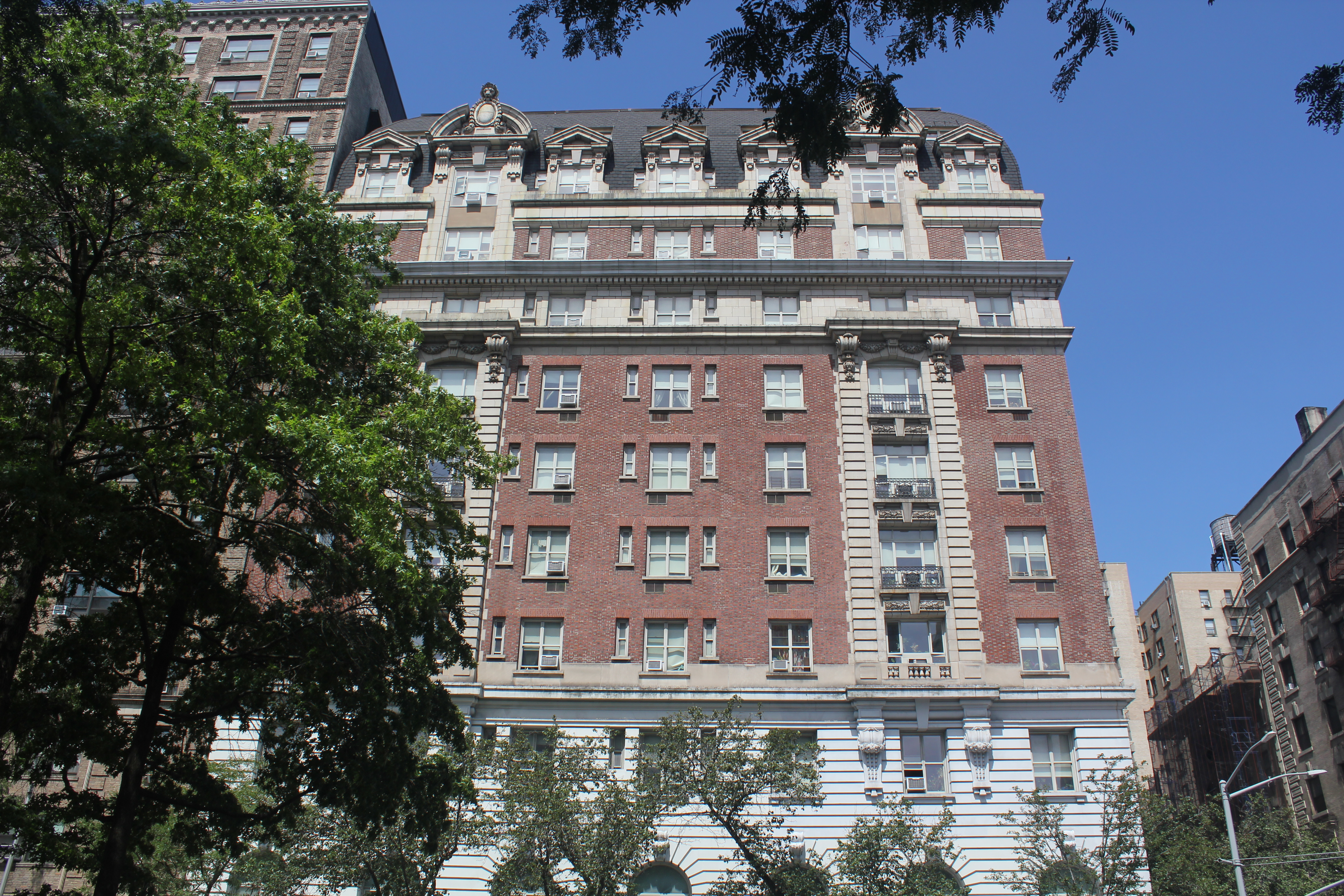
The facade on Broadway

The facade is made of brick and stone, although some decorative details are made of architectural terracotta and wrought iron. On Broadway, the facade is divided into seven bays, while on 103rd Street, the facade is divided into nine bays. The design of the Marseilles is similar to that of the Manhasset Apartments several blocks north, which also has a brick facade and a mansard roof. The western elevation, which is partially visible from the street, is clad with plain brown brick and has three windows on each story.

On Broadway, the first through third stories are clad in rusticated stone blocks, interspersed with some horizontal courses. There are some storefronts on the first story along Broadway, which are separated vertically by piers; a cornice runs above these storefronts. There are keystones and voussoirs above the second-story windows, which are arched. The windows on the third story are smaller, and there are large console brackets flanking the second-outermost windows, as well as narrow slit windows flanking the third and fourth bays from the south. A cornice runs above the third story. On the fourth to seventh stories, the facade is generally made of red brick, except for the stone window sills. The second-outermost bays are flanked by vertical quoins, which support small cornices above the seventh story. The entire eighth floor is clad in stone, while the ninth floor is clad in brick, with a terracotta cornice running horizontally above it. There is a mansard roof above the ninth story, which was re-clad with asphalt tiles in the late 20th century. The tenth-story windows in the mansard roof are topped by pediments, while the eleventh story has double-hung windows within the roof.

The design of the base along 103rd Street is similar to on Broadway, except that the ground slopes up from east to west, and there is a recessed areaway in front of the ground story. There is an iron fence in front of the areaway, which was replaced at some point in the 20th century. The original main entrance to the building is in the central bay on 103rd Street, on the second story, through an arch measuring 15 feet (4.6 m) tall. The entrance is flanked by Tuscan-style fluted columns with bands, and there is an ornate entablature above the columns. In addition, a cartouche with mask and swag motifs is placed above the entrance. The bays directly next to the entrance are arched and contain rectangular panes with an oculus above them. On the third through seventh stories, the window in the central bay is flanked by slit windows. The upper stories are similar in design to the Broadway facade.

=== Features ===
Early plans for the hotel called for a basement with mechanical equipment, including power generators, steam generators, refrigerators, and water and air filters. When the building opened, it was a full-service hotel, and it had several restaurants and central kitchens. The ground story included offices, parlors, a palm court, a 40-by-100-foot (12 by 30 m) main dining room or ballroom, and three smaller dining rooms for private use. In addition, some space was rented out to merchants. There were additional dining rooms on the mezzanine, as well as a dining room for maids and children on the second floor. The dining room was replaced in 1925 with storefronts.

On the third through ninth stories, there were about 31 rooms on each floor, along with 18 private bathrooms and two shared bathrooms. There were 17 suites per floor, each of which had one to three rooms. The tenth floor contained bedrooms for the servants, housekeeper, and housekeeping assistants, in addition to public baths; there was a roof garden above the building. In addition, each floor was served by a freight lift, two passenger elevators, and a mail chute. After a renovation in 1980, the building had 134 apartments. These units were composed of 31 studio apartments and 103 one-bedroom units. Each of the apartments' bathrooms has emergency buzzers, and about one-tenth of the apartments are set aside for disabled residents.

== History ==
During the early 19th century, apartment developments in the city were generally associated with the working class. By the late 19th century, apartment hotels were becoming desirable among the middle and upper classes. Between 1880 and 1885, more than ninety apartment buildings were developed in the city. The city's first subway line was developed under the adjacent section of Broadway starting in the late 1890s, and it opened in 1904 with a station at Broadway and 103rd Street. The construction of the subway spurred the development of high-rise apartment buildings on Broadway. Several apartment hotels had been built along Broadway in advance of the subway's opening, including the Belleclaire and Ansonia to the south, as well as the Manhasset Apartments to the north.

=== Use as apartment hotel ===
==== 1900s to 1920s ====
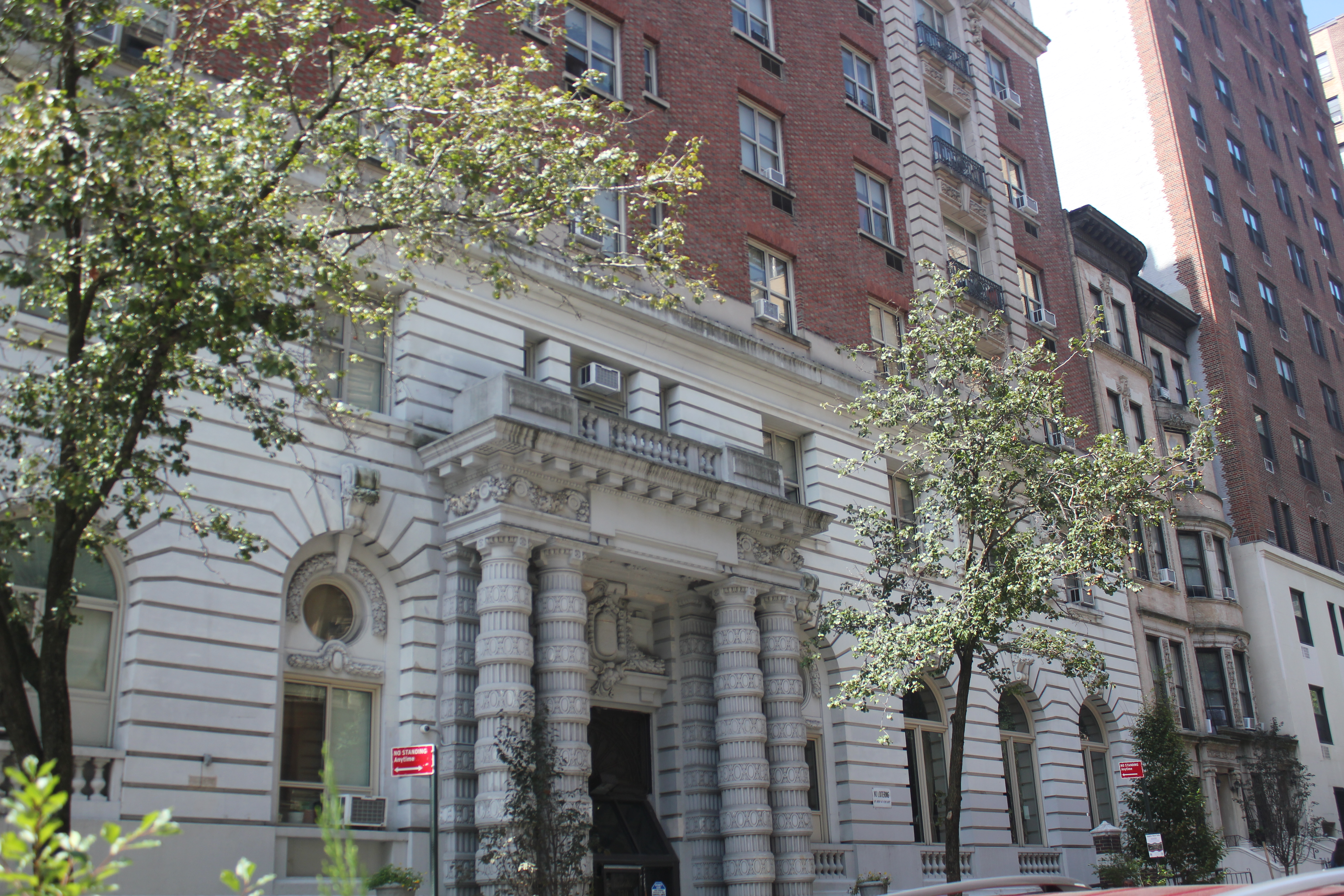
The entrance on 103rd Street

J. Arthur Pinchbeck, who owned the Netherlands Construction Company, acquired a 100-by-125-foot (30 by 38 m) site at the southwest corner of Broadway and 103rd Street in March 1902, with plans to erect a nine-story apartment hotel there. Following an architectural design competition, Pinchbeck hired Harry Allan Jacobs to design an apartment hotel on the site the next month. Jacobs devised blueprints for a brick-and-stone structure with a steel frame, and he filed plans for the hotel with the Manhattan Bureau of Buildings in July 1902, at which point the structure was planned to cost $750,000. The Netherlands Construction Company received the general contract to construct the building. By June 1904, the building's interior finishes were nearly ready. The hotel was completed in October 1905, and Louis Lukes signed a 21-year lease to operate the hotel that month, paying a total of $1.45 million. A promotional brochure described the hotel as offering "first-class accommodations" and "home-like refinement".

In its early years, the Marseilles served both short-term visitors and long-term residents. Among the permanent residents was U.S. president Franklin D. Roosevelt's mother Sara Roosevelt, along with the author Dorothy Parker. It hosted events such as political speeches, dinners, and club meetings, as well as a 1921 Zionist convention. The hotel's operators defaulted on a $66,000 mortgage in mid-1907, and it was offered for sale as part of a foreclosure proceeding although the sale was postponed several times. A firm led by Henry S. Clement Sr. leased the building that October. Shortly afterward, the building was again offered for sale; the building was taken over by the Netherlands Construction Company's creditors for $656,119. Clement's son Henry S. Clement Jr. was designated as the receiver for the Marseille. The businessman Herbert Du Puy bought the structure in October 1909, at which point the structure was known as the Langham. Du Puy also took over the building's $525,000 mortgage.

The H. S. Clement & Son Company sold its leasehold of the Marseilles to James C. Ewing in 1911, and the hotel's manager, Charles A. Weir, announced plans for a roof garden atop the building two years later. To protect views from the Marseilles, Du Puy acquired a house to the west of the hotel in 1916; he bought several additional buildings to the south and west the following year. During the early 1920s, the ground-store storefront was leased to the Marseilles Dress Shop. Du Puy sold the hotel and his other properties on the block in February 1925 to Samuel Brener for about $6.5 million. The new owner hired Charles N. Whinston & Bros. the same year to add storefronts to the ground floor, which cost $100,000. Afterward, one of the new storefronts was leased to Irving Eisler as a drugstore. Brener leased the Marseilles to Harry Tannenbaum's Marseilles Operating Corporation in 1926 for 21 years at a total cost of $3 million. The leasehold was sold later that year to the hotelier Edward Arlington for $2.2 million. At the time, the hotel had 280 rooms, and Arlington operated three other hotels in Upper Manhattan.

==== 1930s to 1970s ====
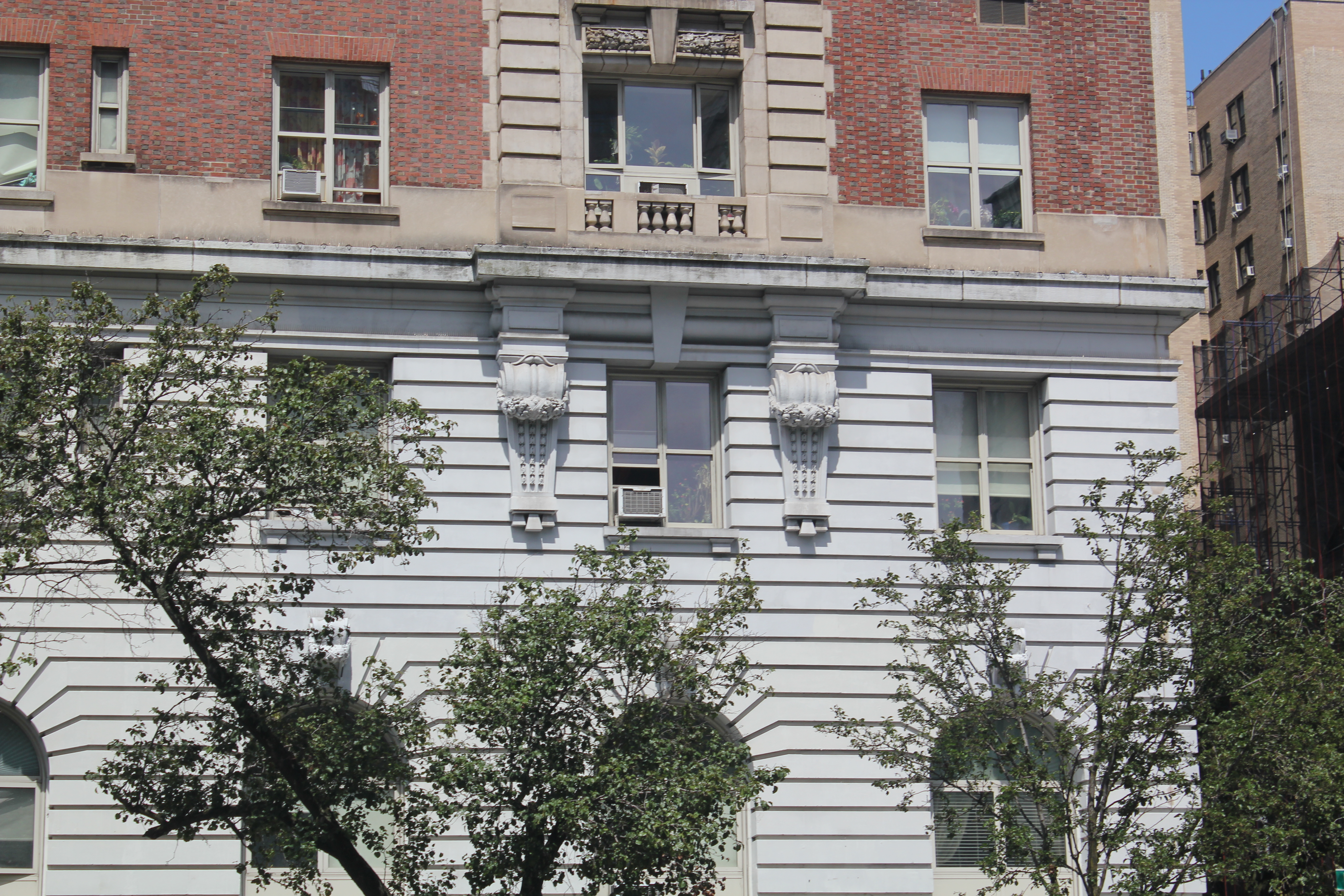
The second through fourth stories as seen from across Broadway

Childs Restaurants renovated one of the storefronts at the building in 1930, replacing the original windows with larger ones. At the time, the Metropolitan Life Insurance Company held a $6 million mortgage on the hotel. After the hotel's owner defaulted on about $744,000 worth of loans on the building, the Morewood Realty Corporation bought the building for $635,000 at a foreclosure auction in December 1937. The Anco Investing Corporation and Sovereign Investing Corporation also waived the liens that they had placed on the building's mortgages. Morewood owned the building until October 1944, when the structure was sold to a holding company named 240 West 103rd Street, Inc. The new owner also took over responsibility for the Marseilles' $555,000 mortgage and negotiated an extension of the mortgage.

After World War II, the Marseilles housed Holocaust survivors, as did several other hotels in Upper Manhattan. The United Service for New Americans leased about 150 rooms to accommodate displaced immigrants, occupying about two-thirds of the Marseilles' available space. The Marseilles' reception room was used as an interview room for newly arrived migrants, and there were also a clothing-donation room, kitchen, classrooms, and clinics for refugees. The organization also hosted English classes and cultural orientations at the hotel, in addition to entertainment and music performances arranged by refugees. The writer William B. Helmreich wrote that some of the refugees had never had a private room before they stayed at the Marseilles. During the Marseilles' time as a Jewish refugee center, the hotel hosted events such as Passover Seders and birthday parties for U.S. president Harry S. Truman. An estimated nine thousand Holocaust survivors passed through the Marseilles between 1946 and 1949, living there for an average of two weeks. By late 1949, the hotel housed 1,500 refugees simultaneously.

Herbert Oberman and several partners bought the operating lease in July 1950 for 21 years, paying $945,000 and taking over a $25,000 mortgage. At the time, there were a total of 271 rooms in the building, divided into one- and two-room apartments. The United Service of New Americans surrendered its lease, and the new operators planned to add kitchenettes to the apartments. The renovation cost $75,000. After the hotel was renovated, Oberman bought the building in May 1951 and transferred the operating lease to an unnamed syndicate represented by the lawyer Abe Silver. Jack Glatstein and Bernie Edelson leased the building itself in October 1952 for 19 years, paying a total of $1.8 million. The lease was then resold in 1956 to the Marseilles Realty Corporation, which planned to renovate the building. By the late 1950s, neighborhood residents frequently complained that the Marseilles' tenants were dumping trash on the street, causing rat infestations. In addition, Edna Crenshaw opened a barbershop at the hotel in 1959 after finding that there were no barbershops for black residents nearby.

The Marseilles had become a single-room occupancy structure by the early 1960s, when it housed many people living on welfare. There was also an unsuccessful proposal to convert the building into housing for the elderly in 1969. By the following decade, one source described the Marseilles as "one of the worst single room occupancy sore spots of the West Side". The New York Times reported that residents of the building frequently threw debris at passersby. The New York Public Service Commission also investigated allegations that the Marseilles was charging its residents excessively high prices for phone service. Emily Kwoh bought the building in 1972, relocated all the tenants there, and began renovating it into housing for elderly Asians. Subsequently, the building was abandoned for five years.

=== Use as elderly housing ===
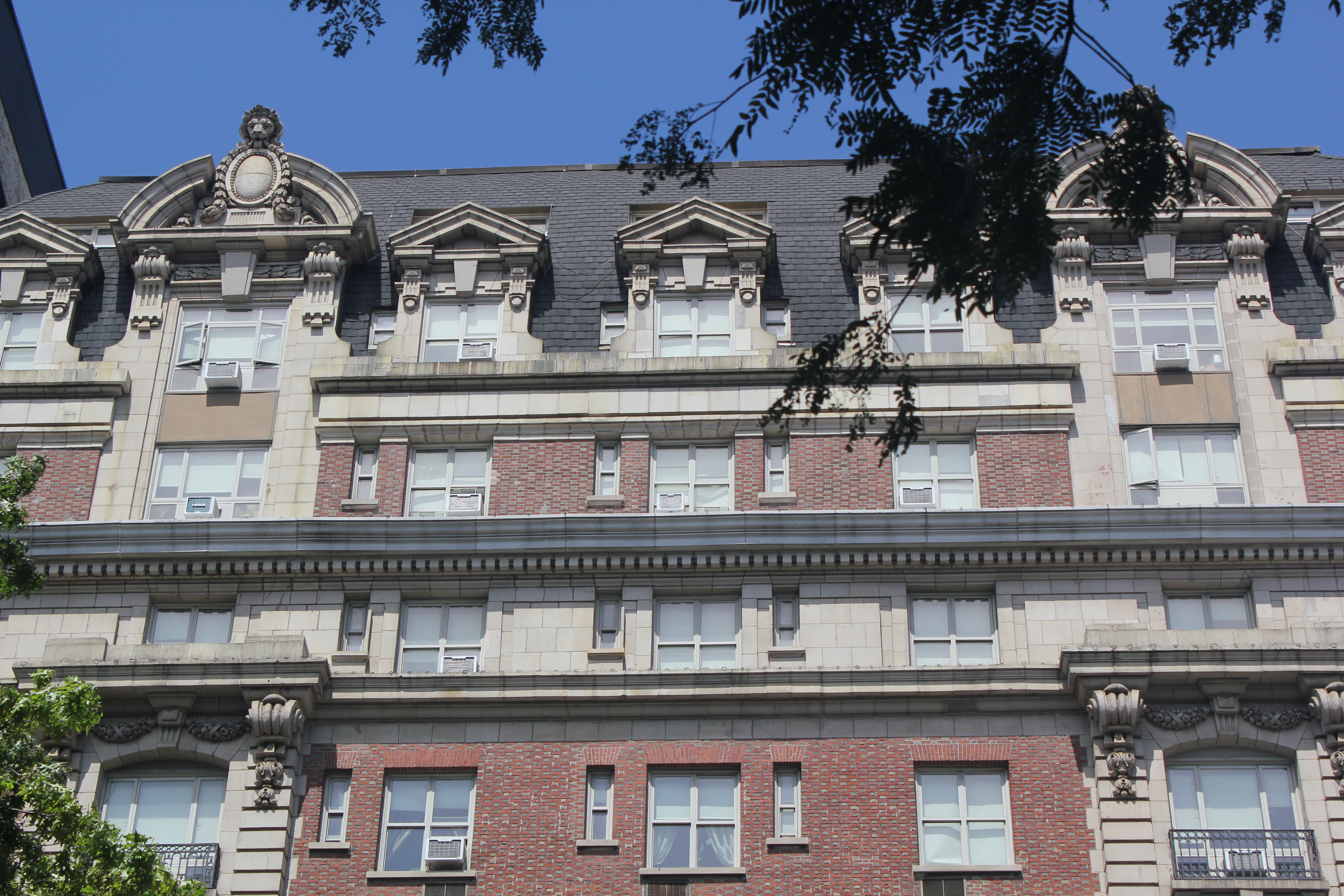
Architectural details of the upper stories

Starting in 1978, the 102nd–103rd Streets Block Association petitioned local residents to convert the building into affordable housing for elderly people. At the time, the proposal required $20,000 in seed money until the federal government of the United States could provide further funds for the conversion; the block association raised $2,000 of that amount through small donations. The West Side Federation for Senior Housing sponsored the building's conversion, and the federal government provided an annual subsidy to help pay off the building's $5 million mortgage. In addition, the Jewish Association for Services to the Aged held group activities in the building. The affordable-housing conversion was completed in 1980.

Following the renovation, the Marseilles had 134 units of subsidized housing; all of the apartments were occupied within a year. Some of the building's apartments were rented to elderly Jewish people who lived in tenements nearby. A Thai restaurant opened within the building in 1982. The New York City Landmarks Preservation Commission began considering whether to designate the Marseilles as a city landmark in 1988, and the building was officially designated as a landmark two years later on October 2, 1990. The cornice above the eighth floor was also replaced in 1990 after it had deteriorated. In the 21st century, the Marseilles continues to function as a subsidized-housing development for elderly residents.

== See also ==
- List of New York City Designated Landmarks in Manhattan from 59th to 110th Streets
- List of buildings and structures on Broadway in Manhattan
