= Chienbäse =

Fasnacht tradition in Switzerland

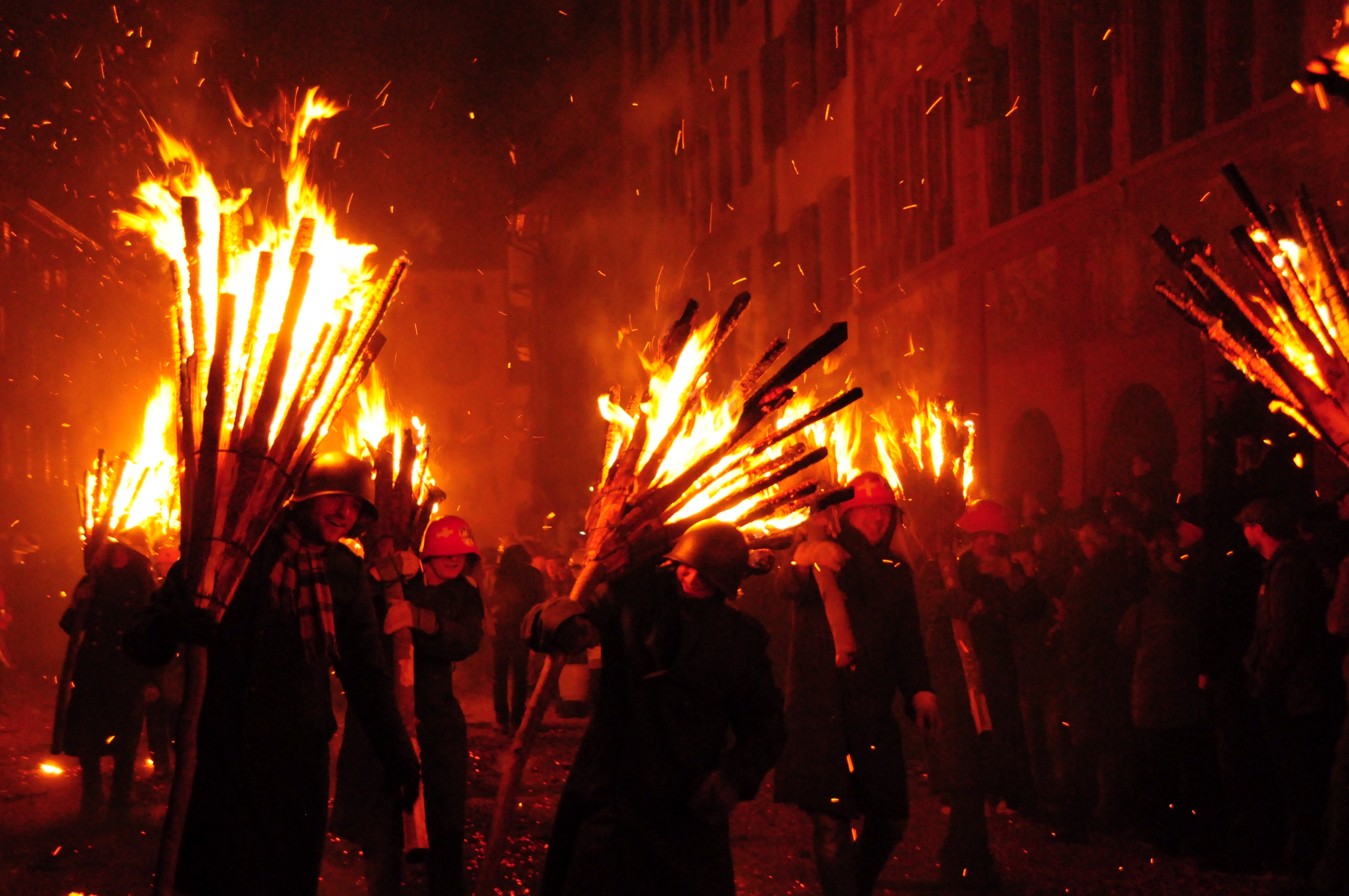
People carrying a "Chienbäse"

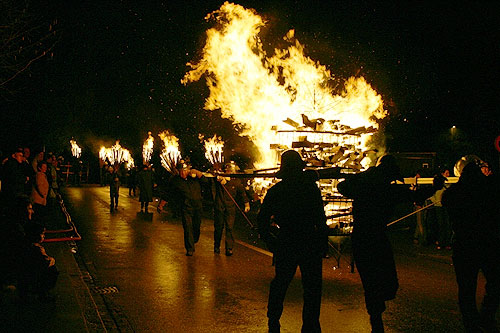
Carriers moving a bonfire in a carrying cage. Chienbäse bearers are visible in the background.

Chienbäse is a Fasnacht tradition of Liestal, Basel-Landschaft, Switzerland.

On the Sunday night after Ash Wednesday, the night before the Morgestraich in Basel city, a procession begins of people carrying burning bundles of pinewood chips (called Chienbäse, the Alemannic German for "pinewood besom") through the medieval town center along the Rathausstrasse, entering through the city gate from the south. In more recent decades the Chienbäse have been augmented with carts carrying bonfires, with flames often reaching as high as the houses. The parade is attended by thousands of spectators from Switzerland as well as from countries around the globe, closely packed on either side of the small street.

The origins of the custom are open to speculation. Often identified as a "pagan spring ritual" due to the archaic qualities of the fire spectacle, the earliest report of a procession of torch bearers dates to 1869. A tradition of bonfires before Lent has a longer history of attestation, dating from at least the 16th century.
