= Narrenmarsch =

Composition of march music

A Narrenmarsch is a composition of march music that is exclusively played at Fastnacht. Especially in the traditional Swabian-Alemannic Fastnacht, nearly every town has its own Narrenmarsch. The marches are mostly played during parades and other public events of the Narren. Many of these marches also got lyrics written for them that participants and audience can sing along.

== History ==
The Narrhallamarsch from Mainz from 1840 is regarded as the first specifically for the Fastnacht arranged march. It uses motives from a French opera.

The Narrenmarsch of Rottweil was presumably the first dedicated Narrenmarsch of the Swabian-Alemannic Fasnet and was composed by Heinrich von Basele in 1882. It premiered at a hall-event. It was rediscovered in 1911 by then musical director Sander, who arranged it for military music and played it at the parade with the town orchestra. A text for it was composed by Otto Wolf in 1919. In translation, the text describes the Rottweiler Fasnet as follows: "As long as blood flows through the veins of the city, we´ll celebrate Fasnet, Fasnet in all its glory. Holding up the tradition, never straying from it. To everyone´s joy and to nobody´s harm.").

Besides these marches that are composed for the occasion, existing marches can also become Narrenmärsche through being traditionally played at Fasnet parades. The "Altjägermarsch" for example is a widespread melody. It was originally composed as "Marsch der Freiwilligen Jäger" for the German Campaign of 1813 between 1813 and 1815 but is still played at the Fasnet. In Rottweil, the youth orchestra usually plays it at the parade. In Meersburg and Kiebingen it is just known as the "Narrenmarsch" while it is called "Sechseläuten-Marsch" in Zürich.
