= Helvetia Village Historic District =

Historic district in West Virginia, United States

- Helvetia
- U.S. National Register of Historic Places
- U.S. Historic district
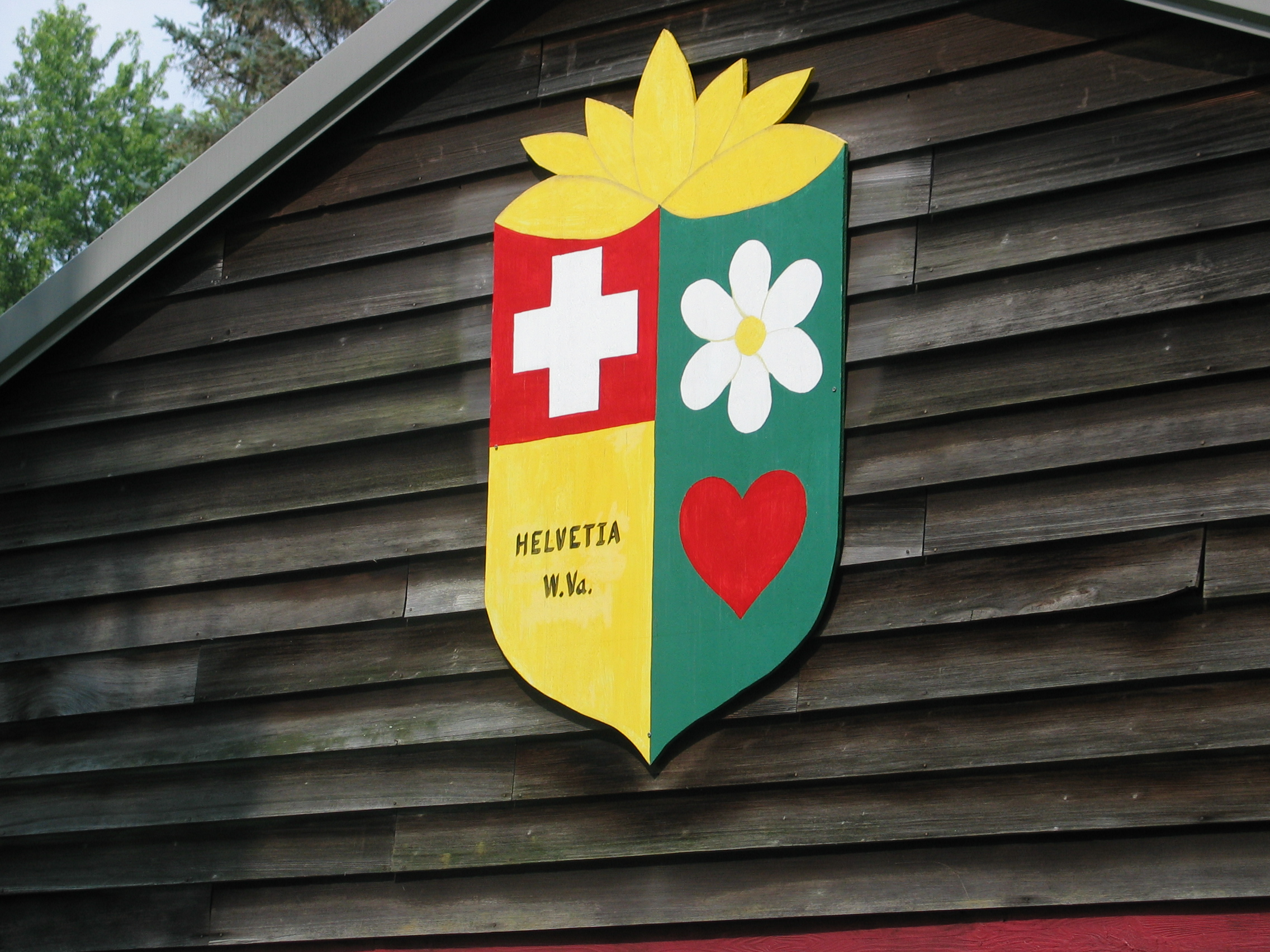
- Sign in Helvetia, West Virginia, August 2004

- Location within West Virginia Location within the United States
- Location: SR 45 and SR 46, Helvetia, West Virginia
- Coordinates: 38°42′19″N 80°12′14″W
- Area: 45 acres (18 ha)
- Architect: Rudolph Zumbach
- Architectural style: Carpenter Gothic, Log Cabin
- NRHP reference No.: 78002810
- Added to NRHP: November 29, 1978

Helvetia Village Historic District is a national historic district located at Helvetia, Randolph County, West Virginia. It encompasses 26 contributing buildings in the village center. Some of the buildings date to the original settlement period in 1869–1870, when they were built of log construction. Later 19th-century and early-20th century buildings are of frame construction, with a number in the Carpenter Gothic style. Notable buildings include The Church (1882), Huber Inn (c. 1880), Post Office and Store / house (1920s), the log Swiss Museum (c. 1869), Star Band Hall, Cheese Haus, an original cabin (1870), Helvetia Community Hall (1939), and Rudolph's Carpenter Shop.

It was listed on the National Register of Historic Places in 1978.
