= Helvetia, West Virginia =

Census-designated place in the United States

- Census-designated place
- Location within West Virginia Location within the United States
- Coordinates: 38°42′21″N 80°12′4″W
- Country: United States
- State: West Virginia
- County: Randolph
- Settled: 1869

Area
  - Total: 1.815 sq mi (4.70 km^{2})
  - Land: 1.815 sq mi (4.70 km^{2})
  - Water: 0 sq mi (0 km^{2})
- Elevation: 2,280 ft (690 m)

Population (2020)
  - Total: 38
  - Density: 21/sq mi (8.1/km^{2})
- Time zone: UTC-5 (Eastern (EST))
  - Summer (DST): UTC-4 (EDT)
- GNIS feature ID: 2586824
- Website: https://www.helvetiawv.com/

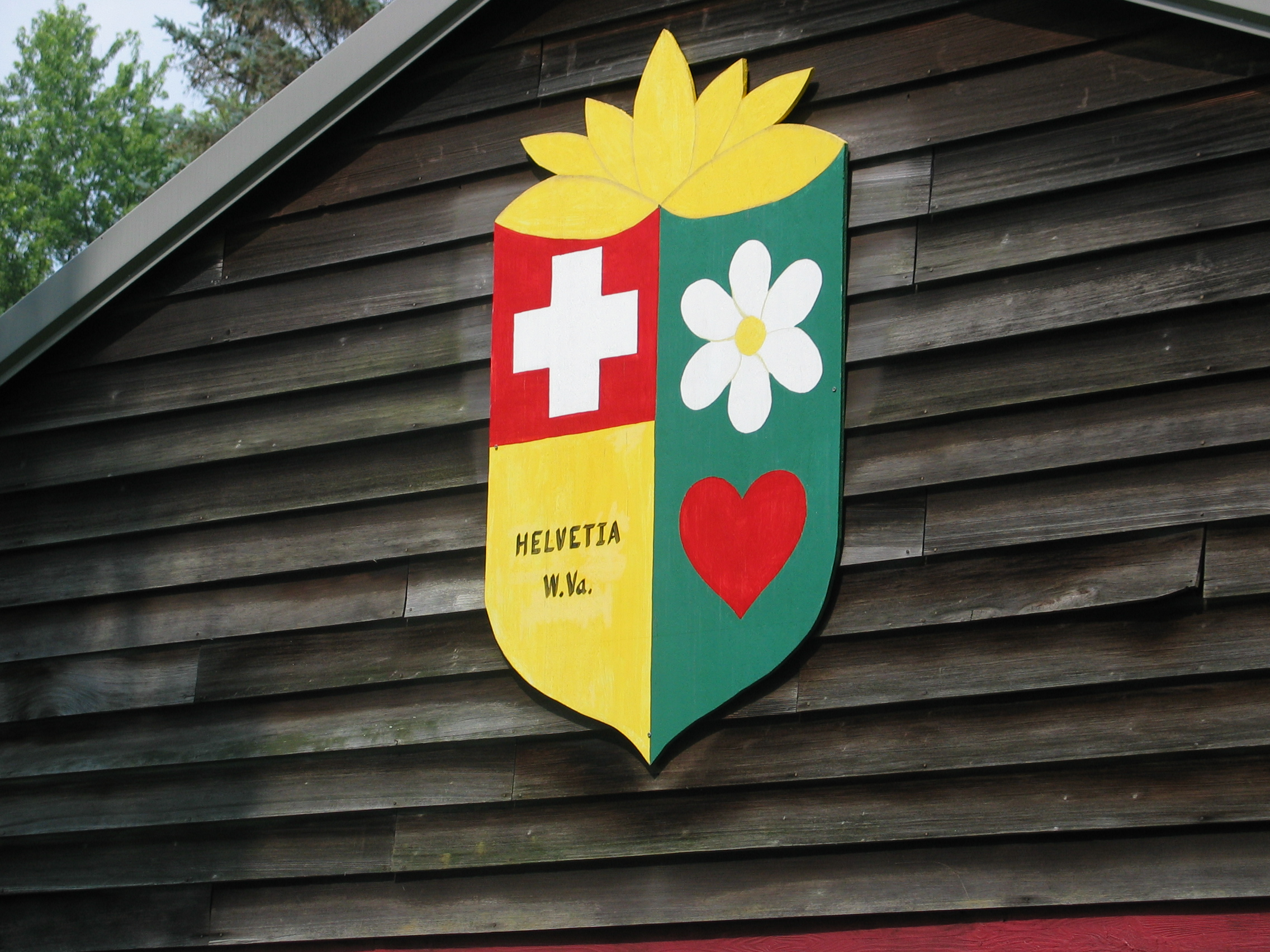
Shield representing Helvetia

Helvetia is a census-designated place (CDP) in Randolph County, West Virginia, United States. According to the 2020 census, its population was 38 compared to 59 at the 2010 census. The isolated community was settled by the Swiss starting in 1869, and is known today for retaining Swiss traditions, food, and folkways.

== History ==
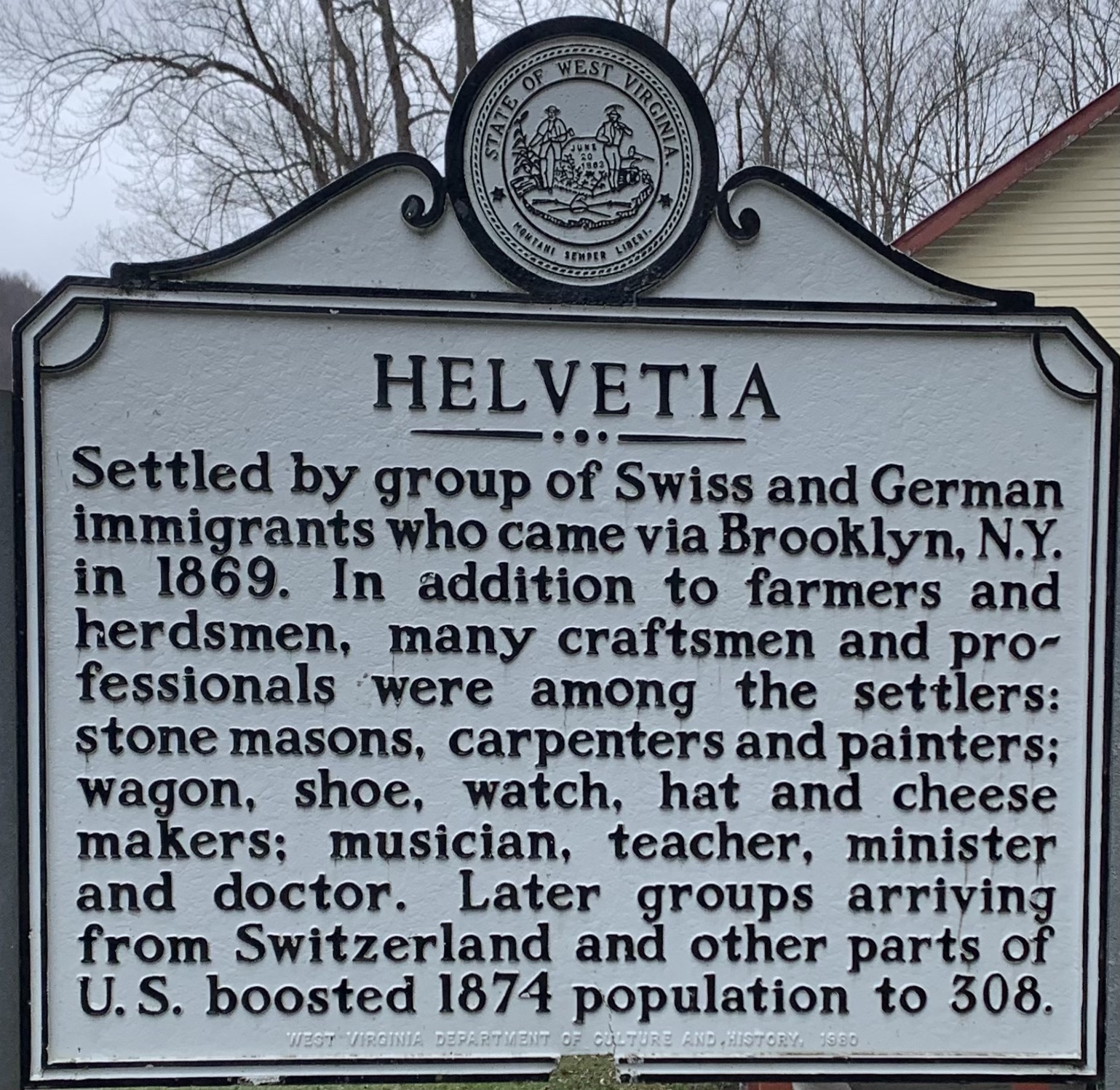
Historical marker located within the historic district

After the end of the Civil War, a group of Swiss German-speaking immigrants calling themselves the Grütliverein (Grütli Society) formed in Brooklyn, New York. The members agreed that they would all emigrate to another section of the country together when the time was right.

A member of the society named Isler surveyed large swaths of the eastern West Virginia mountains for a Washington-based firm and reported back to the society on the richness of the country. A six-man committee was assembled and left Brooklyn by rail on October 15, 1869. They arrived at Clarksburg on October 20th and traveled by foot over the mountains.

They reached a plot that was on offer for sale on October 20, and were disappointed by the extreme thickness of the wilderness in this lightly settled and rugged country. The land was very reasonably priced, though, and they had offers of other assistance from the land agents in Clarksburg if they would encourage further settlement in the area. After hearing the report of this exploration, the society members decided to go to West Virginia.

The settlers were able to buy their own tracts of land because of its low cost. An area of 100 acres (0.40 km^{2}) was set aside at the center of the community and split into lots, which were sold to skilled tradesmen as an incentive.

At the beginning of 1871, there were 32 people living in the community. A new arrival in that year, C.E. Lutz, became the local land agent and wrote advertisements in English and German for papers across the country extolling the virtues of the settlement. Lutz's methods would later face scrutiny from both American and Swiss authorities, and he would be investigated in 1880 by West Virginia State Senator Joseph J. Woods.

New settlers came from various parts of the United States and Canada, and some immigrated directly from Switzerland. In addition to farmers and herdsmen, many craftsmen and professionals were among the settlers: stonemasons; carpenters; painters; wagon, shoe, watch, hat, and cheese makers; musicians; teachers; ministers; and doctors. By 1874 the community's population had grown to a heady 308, and by 1875 a band and mutual aid society called the Schweizer-Kranken-Unterstützung-Verein (or, the Swiss Health Support Association) had been organized.

During the late 1960s, Eleanor Mailloux and Delores Baggerly worked to attract tourists to the town by highlighting the town's Swiss heritage. They established the Hütte restaurant, collaborated on a community cookbook titled Oppis Guet's vo Helvetia, and began the public annual Fasnacht celebration. Notably, Helvetia's Fasnacht combines the customs of the traditional Swiss Fasnacht and Sechseläuten.

The Helvetia Village Historic District was listed on the National Register of Historic Places in 1978.

== Events and festivals ==
- Fasnacht, last Saturday before Lent
- West Virginia Maple Syrup Festival, third Weekend in March
- Helvetia Ramp Supper, last Saturday in April
- Follow Your Bliss Festival, weekend after Father's Day
- Swiss National Holiday, Saturday nearest August 1
- Helvetia Community Fair, second full weekend in September
- Thanksgiving Dinner, Fourth Thursday in November
- Feast of Saint Nicholas Day, Saturday closest to December 5

== Notable people ==
- Jack Gibbons, pianist and composer
