= Swabian-Alemannic Fastnacht =

Pre-Lenten carnival in Alemannic folklore

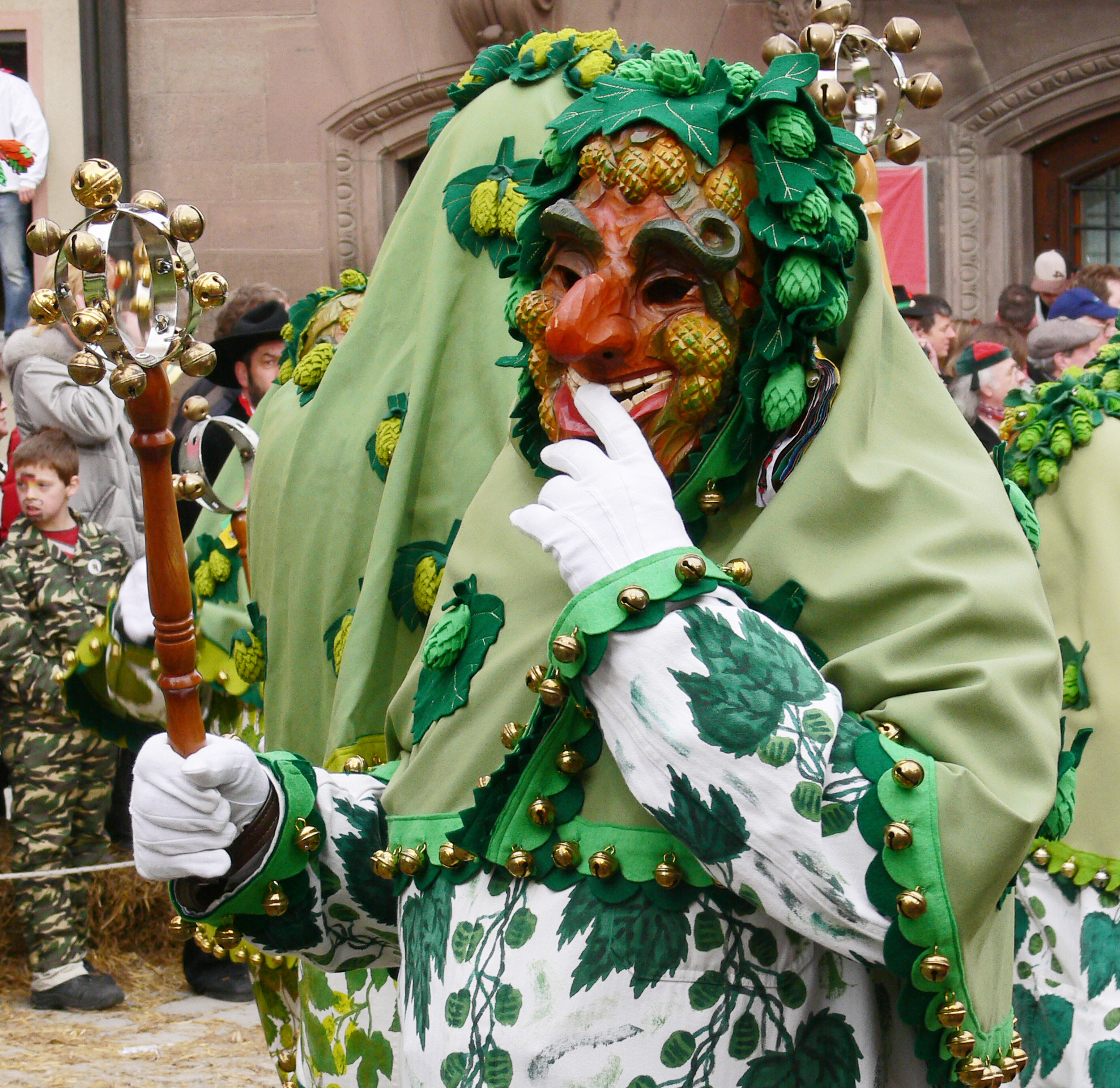
"Hopfennarr" from Tettnang with costume and mask

The Swabian-Alemannic Fastnacht, Fasnacht (in Switzerland) or Fasnat/Faschnat (in Vorarlberg) is the pre-Lenten carnival of Alemannic folklore in Switzerland, southern Germany, Alsace and Vorarlberg.

== Etymology ==
Popular etymology often links Fastnacht (in Mainz also Fassenacht, in Switzerland Fasnacht, in Swabia Fasnet, Fasent) with fasten ("to fast") – allegedly from celebrations on the eve preceding fasting. In the beginning of the 20th century it was a common assumption that the tradition had its roots in pre-Christian ritual. Comparison of dialect variants, however, yields an Old High German *fasanaht, with an element fasa- of unclear meaning. A likely derivation looked to Proto-Indo-European *pwo- "purify" (cognate to pava-mana), or alternatively to Middle High German vaselen "prosper, bud", and interpreted the festival as a fertility rite. Historians around Werner Mezger refuted those theories, and showed that the name derives from fasten ("to fast") and the tradition is Christian. They also showed that a lot of the rites came from the civitas diaboli model of the Catholic church.

Fasching (MHG vaschanc or vaschang) is related, probably originally with a second element -gang instead of -nacht.

== Overview ==
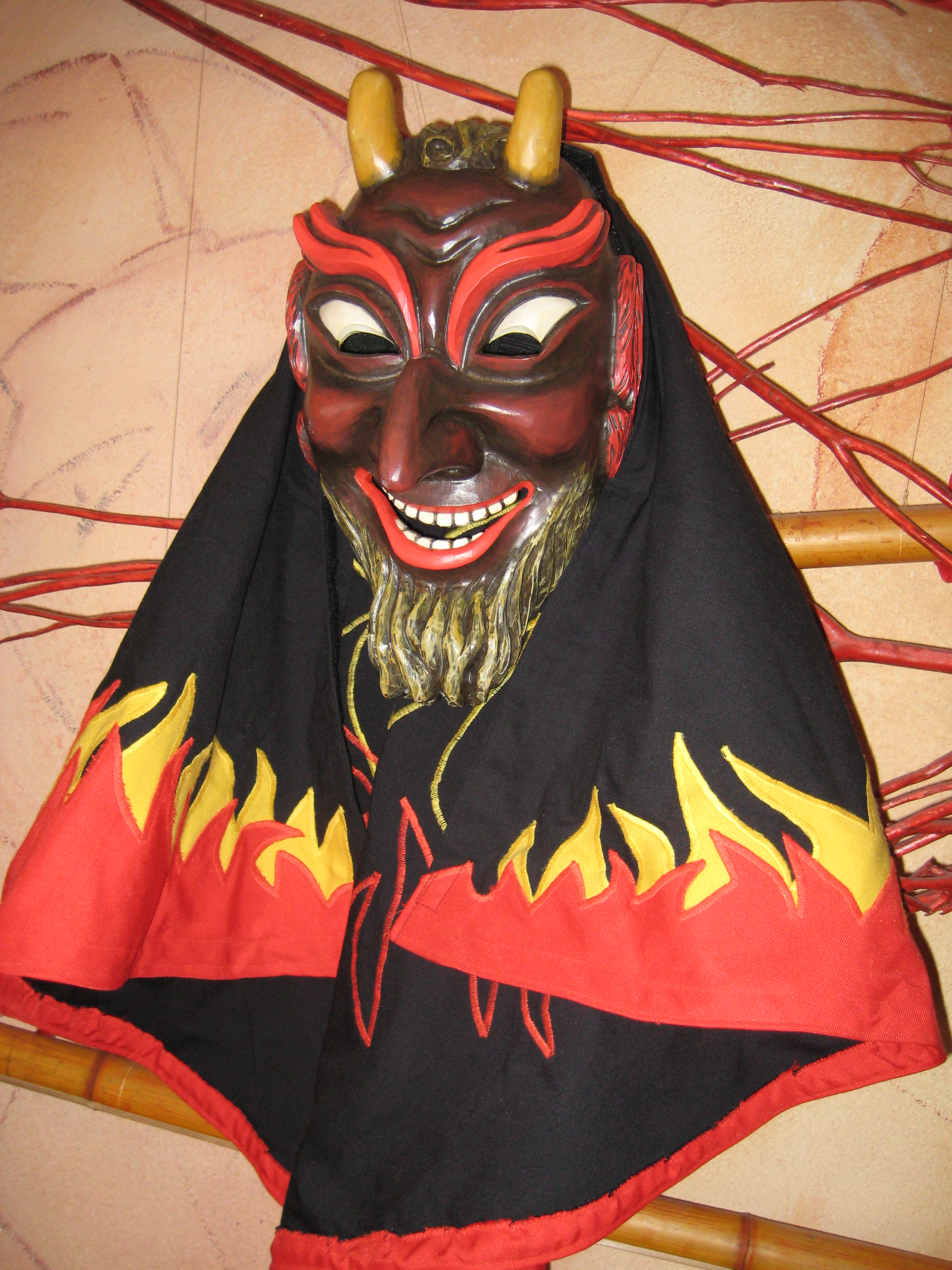
Fastnacht mask in Swabia

Fastnacht is held in the settlement area of the Germanic tribes of the Swabians and Alemanni, where Swabian-Alemannic dialects are spoken. The region covers German Switzerland, the larger part of Baden-Württemberg, Alsace, south-western Bavaria and Vorarlberg (western Austria).

The festival starts on the Thursday before Ash Wednesday, known as Schmotziger Donnerstag. In Standard German, schmutzig means "dirty", but in the Alemannic dialects schmotzig means "lard" (Schmalz), or "fat"; "Greasy Thursday", as remaining winter stores of lard and butter used to be consumed at that time, before the fasting began. Elsewhere the day is called "Women's Carnival" (Weiberfastnacht), being the day when tradition says that women take control. In particular regions of Tyrol, Salzburg and Bavaria traditional processions of the Perchten welcome the springtime. The Schönperchten (beautiful Perchts) represent the birth of new life in the awakening nature, the Schiachperchten ("ugly Perchts") represent the dark spirits of wintertime. Farmers yearn for warmer weather and the Perchtenlauf (Run of Perchts) is a magical expression of that desire. The nights between winter and spring, when evil ghosts are supposed to go around, are also called Rauhnächte (rough nights).

Swabian-Alemannic Fastnacht distinguishes itself from the Rhenish Carnival but did not develop an independent form until the first quarter of the 20th century. Whilst Carnival developed a new form of Fastnacht in the 18th century, an influence, which was taken up by the Swabian-Alemannic Fastnacht as well, contemplations to look back took place in the 20th century, recalling the traditions of Fastnacht in the Middle Age and the Early modern period.

== The Fastnacht cycle ==
=== Start: January 6th ===
The program of the coming Fastnacht is announced in public meetings, e.g. in Bad Saulgau or Bonndorf, and in other towns like Waldkirch and Löffingen people gather in jesters’ meetings to discuss organizational details. A special type of jesters’ meetings, however, has been by far the most popular type of meetings for centuries. These are meetings of several thousands of jesters, and they take place almost every weekend in the weeks after Epiphany.

In many places, jesters will produce deafening noise using whips, or shaking the bells on the Häser (costumes) until they can be sure that every little bit of dust has fallen out; cleanliness is generally of great importance on January 6. In the area of the upper Neckar, “Abstauber” with black clothes will go door to door to clean the mothballed jesters' clothes. In Rottenburg am Neckar, witches will conduct a similar procedure on the guests and furniture of local inns.

Therefore, the so-called “Fiaßwäsch“ (washing of the feet) takes place in Lauffen ob Rottweil where the jester's council wash their feet in the ice-cold water of the fountain. At the same time, the jester's masks take pride of place in the living rooms of Immendingen and Möhringen. The Schramberger jesters also show their reverence towards the jester's clothing by solemnly blessing it: “Sei mir gegrüßt, du edles Kleid der Narren. Tritt nun hervor aus Deiner Jahresbleibe. Und erfülle mit Freude die Großen und die Kleinen. Dir sei geweiht die Fasnet im Jahre des Heils 20..“. (Greetings to the noble jester's robe. Come forth from where you have stayed all year. Bring joy to the old and the young. We dedicate this year's Fasnet to you.) The most important role on and around January 6 takes the jester's friendly gatherings.

=== Candlemas ===
The number of Fastnacht events again is noticeably increasing everywhere by the 40th day after Christmas, the Candlemas on February 2. On this day, it is common to do the Maschgern (Oberschwaben), the Strählen (Villingen), the Schnurren (Schwarzwald), the Welschen (Schömberg), the Hecheln (Oberndorf) or the Aufsagen: the jesters choose the most remarkable incidents of the last year to retell them to the people in an entertaining way.

Although in some places the Fastnacht celebrations already begin on November 11, as is common in the Rhenish regions, in Swabian-Allemanic areas, Fastnacht events typically only start off after the festive days following Christmas - on January 6, which is also Epiphany.

Drawing on an old custom, this is the day when the masks get a dusting and the first events and parades can begin. Strictly speaking, Fastnacht only begins with Fat Thursday (the Thursday before Ash Wednesday), which is the climax of the celebrations and the time when the parades and other celebrations become more frequent. There are also a number of recipes that are traditionally cooked at that time.

Accordingly, to many Swabian-Allemanic Jesters the date when Fastnacht begins marks a crucial distinctive feature to Karneval. Many people consider January 6 to be the original starting date. However, recent research does not support this opinion. On November 11, quite similar to Fastnachtsdienstag (Shrove Tuesday), starts a pre-Christmas fasting period that lasts for forty days. Hence, on Martinmas, similar traditions to Fastnacht can be ascertained. However, November 11 only evolved into the beginning of Fastnachtssaison (Carnival season) with the emergence of Karneval in the 19th century. After all, a Fastnacht that lasted over Advent season and Christmas would completely have opposed the meaning of these days.

The beginning of Fastnacht is celebrated full-throatedly in many places.

People used to wear masks and perform various songs and plays, for example, murder ballads. It was also common to gloss the actions of the fellow citizens at the roadside. Today the people meet in pubs at fixed times and the undisguised jesters go from pub to pub together. The commonly used forms of expression are four-liners and songs. Although the Swabian-Alemannic Fastnacht basically takes place in pubs in restaurants, there is a short period of Fastnacht sessions inside of halls after Candlemess (Lichtmess). Local clubs contribute to Fastnacht by organizing dancing events.

=== Wednesday before Fastnacht ===
Originally, the Wednesday before Fastnacht has not been a traditional holiday for the Swabian-Alemannic jesters. However, during the post-war era, some customs have been established that are celebrated in the early evening and herald the time of Fastnacht. Parts of these customs are the proclamation (German Ausrufen) or search (German Suche) for Fastnacht in the Black Forest area, as well as the incantation of the masks (German Maskenbeschwörung) or the fountain-cleaning ritual in Upper Swabia.

=== Thursday ===
Schmotziger Donnerstag which in the Alemannic dialects means "lard-laden Thursday " (from Schmotz meaning Schmalz), or "fat"; "Greasy Thursday", as remaining winter stores of lard and butter used to be consumed at that time, before the fasting began. Elsewhere the day is called "Women's Carnival" (Weiberfastnacht), being the day when tradition says that women take control. In particular regions of Tyrol, Salzburg and Bavaria traditional processions of the Perchten welcome the springtime. The Schönperchten (beautiful Perchts) represent the birth of new life in the awakening nature, the Schiachperchten ("ugly Perchts") represent the dark spirits of wintertime.

=== Determination of Fastnacht-Tuesday ===
Fastnacht-Tuesday is the day (respectively the night) before Lent, which always starts on Ash Wednesday. The date of the Ash Wednesday is strictly regulated. It is constantly located 46 days before Easter Sunday, which in turn is celebrated on the first Sunday after the earliest full moon in spring.

=== Old Fastnacht, Buurefasnacht ===
Despite the reforms of the Council of Benevento, which had brought forward the date of the beginning of Lent by six days, the original date (Tuesday, i the sixth week before eastern) was not forgotten, especially in rural areas as well as in protestant areas, which did not recognise these resolutions of the council.

In these areas, Fastnacht continued to be celebrated just under a week later on Monday: these customs still exist today, being preserved either as "Alte" or "Bauernfastnacht" ("old" or "peasants' Fastnacht"; alemannic: "Buurefastnacht"). Fastnacht was then frequently celebrated twice; the first Fastnacht, which ended on Ash Wednesday, was often called "Herren-" or "Pfaffenfastnacht" ("lords'" or "parsons' Fastnacht") to differentiate it from the Bauernfastnacht.

=== Groppenfastnacht ===
The Groppenfastnacht in Ermatingen, on the Swiss south bank of the Bodensee, which is celebrated three weeks before Easter, is considered "the world's last Fastnacht". In 2015, its 600th anniversary was celebrated, and it is deemed to be the Fastnacht that is most rich in tradition in eastern Switzerland.

== History ==
=== Origin in the Middle Ages and the Early Modern Age ===
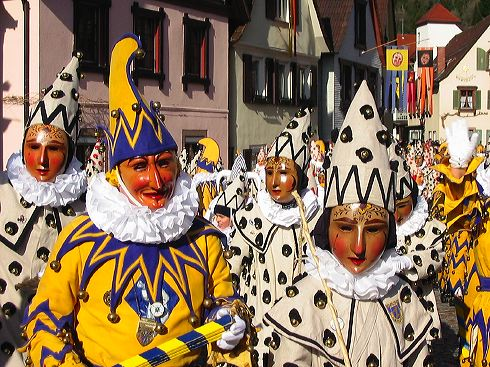
Jesters of baroque and Italian style: Wolfacher Schellen- und Röslehansel

Just like the carnival common in the Rhineland, the Swabian-Alemannic Fastnacht takes its origins from festivities, which were celebrated to consume perishable food before the beginning of lent. These kind of events have been recorded in central Europe from at least the 13th century. Historically, the festivities would vary from region to region, and the Fastnacht of the present day has notable differences to its historical counterparts. In addition to the excessive consumption of food, customs including dances, parades or Fastnacht games became popular since the 14th century. Food played a central role as well. In the parades of the Nuremberg guilds, the so-called “Schembartläufe”, were popular around 1500 AD. Butcher's dances, which featured the dancing butchers holding sausage rings, are also known from other cities.

A theory of the folklorist Dietz-Rüdiger Moser says that the conflict between the amusement/enjoyment of Fastnacht and the deprivation of Lent can also be interpreted in a theological way. Whereas, according to the augustinian two kingdoms doctrine, Fastnacht was equated with the kingdom of the devil “civitas diaboli”, Lent was seen as part of the kingdom of God or “civitas Dei”. This idea might have led to the invention of early Fastnacht figures such as devils and demons. The jester, who was considered as another central figure of Fastnacht at that time, was seen as the embodiment of evanescence, separation from god and death. Whereas studies conducted before and during the 1980s assumed that Fastnacht did not originate from Christian beliefs, scholars today agree that the existence of the church was a necessary condition for the emergence of Fastnacht. Fastnacht was an opportunity for the people to criticise authorities and also the church. This often led to prohibitions of Fastnacht.

Following the reformation, not only the period of fasting was dispensed with in the regions affected, but also the Fastnacht celebrations came to an end in many parts of Central Europe. Despite this, the tradition was still kept alive in individual protestant towns for some time. The Carnival of Basel is often presumed to be held at a later point than in other Swabian-Allemanic towns as a result of the reformation. In fact this is due to a decision made by the church in the 11th century, stating that Sundays were to be excluded from Lent. As a consequence, Ash Wednesday was preponed by six days. Basel (and also some other towns) however still held on to the traditional day.

Before Baroque, Fastnacht had been dominated by relatively plain costumes. However, during the emergence of Baroque, the Fastnacht motives and figures went through a period of revaluation and refinement. This especially applied for the commonly used masks, which were now carved out of wood instead of using clay or paper, like it had been customary before. Additionally to this development there was an increasing and distinct Italian influence on Fastnacht, based on the Commedia dell’arte.

=== Carnival and its renunciation ===
Despite its revaluation during Baroque, Fastnacht was thought to be a "primitive, outdated custom from the dim and distant past" in the Enlightenment. Due to that common point of view, celebrating Fastnacht stopped or was even forbidden. This changed when, influenced by Romanticism, carnival started to develop.

Beginning in cities like Cologne, where Fastnacht was increasingly being organized by the intellectual middle class instead of the working class, carnival quickly established itself throughout central Europe. The original Fastnacht still existed, but was driven back more and more. Only at the beginning of the 19th century some old customs were picked up again; especially in rural areas and in the lower middle class in the Swabian-Alemannic area, people felt patronized by carnival, which was dominated by the educated middle class, and started remembering traditions passed down from previous generations. In the subsequent period, numerous old Narrenzünfte were re-established.

Until today, the Vereinigung Schwäbisch-Alemannischer Narrenzünfte ("Union of Swabian-Alemannic Jester Guilds"; VSAN) rarely admits new members, whereas the basis of the admission can be traced back to historic custom. Soon after, the umbrella organizations Verband Oberrheinischer Narrenzünfte (1937) and Narrenvereinigung Hegau-Bodensee (1959) were founded. This founding wave remains up until today. One of the main reasons for this wave is the introduction of meetings for jesters established by Hermann Eris Busse. The VSAN and its sister associations allow jesters to meet other jesters outside of their traditional villages. The Landesverein Badische Heimat, whose manager Busse was, hosted the first of these meetings on January 28, 1928, in Freiburg. Today, the number and dimension of these meetings have grown to an extent in which they threaten the traditional and village specific Fastnacht. Meanwhile, there are guilds that only visit jesters meetings without having village roots. Especially the VSAN has decided to reduce any form of these meetings greatly. This decision has, however, done no harm to the growing popularity of the meetings.

=== Development into modern Fastnacht ===
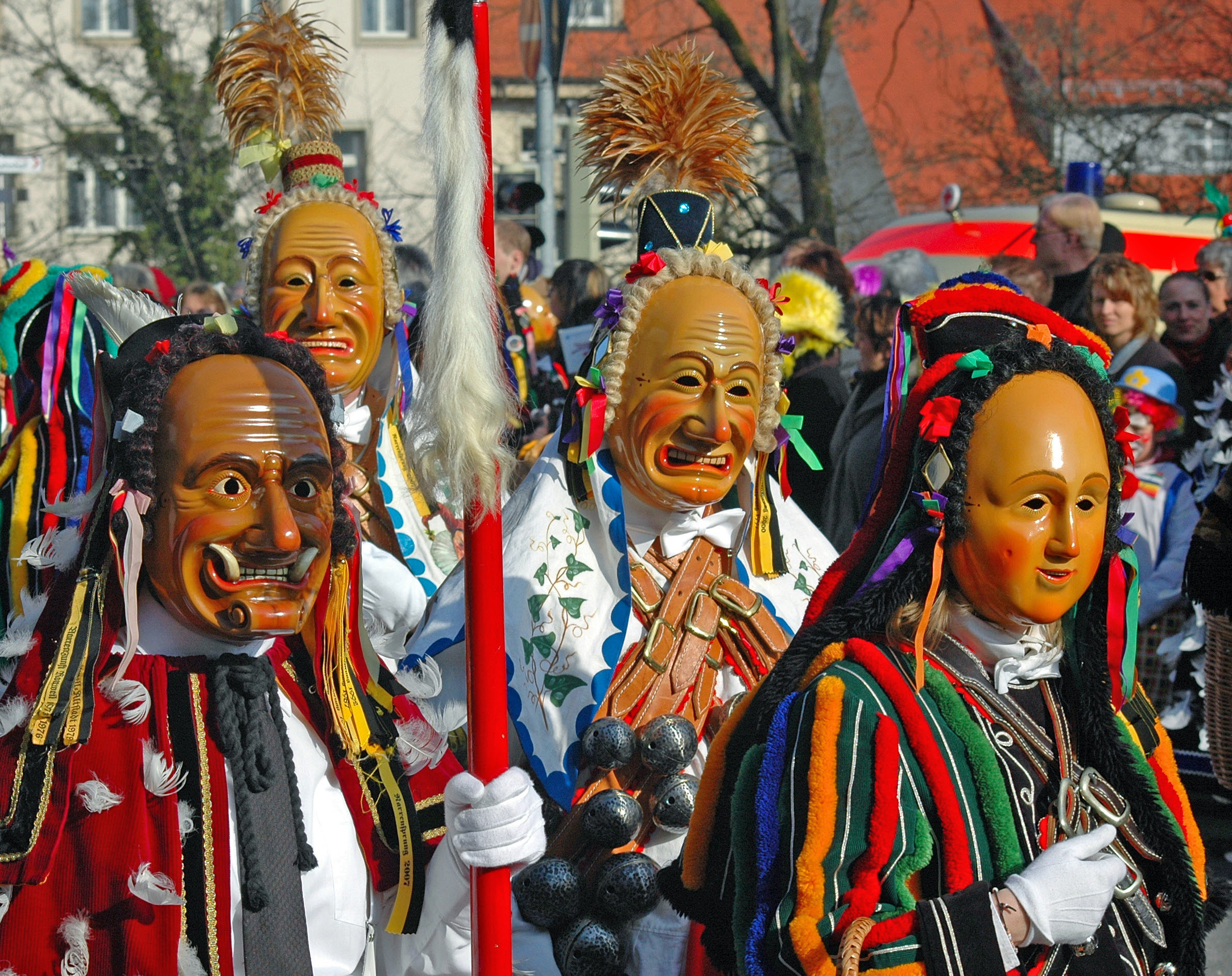
Masks of Fastnacht in Rottweil 2007

Up until the 20th century Fastnacht was only a local event that was celebrated solely at one's hometown. At the beginning of the 20th century the jester guilds started to organize and form jester's unions. This led to the founding of the Vereinigung Schwäbisch-Alemannischer Narrenzünfte in 1924. Forming this nationwide umbrella organization was necessary because of the unstable political situation and many regional Fastnacht bans. By creating the VSAN the jesters wanted to actively represent their political interests. Furthermore, they wanted to foster and preserve their culture, which is the main task of the organization today. After its establishment the VSAN quickly became popular to such an extent, that it had to stop accepting new members.

Numerous new Fastnacht characters have been created since the beginning of the 20th century alongside the organizational reform of the fool's guilds. Real historical Narrenhäser (disguises), which also could be worn in the new century without major changes, were preserved only in a few Fastnachten. Individual parts of masks (Larven) and disguises were much more common. They could not be classified that easily but they were combined with new characters. There were new developments of fool's guilds as well: In 1933 the Hexenzunft in Offenburg was founded, which was based on a combination of a fairy-tale and a medieval witch. This made the "Fastnachtshexe" a popular character of the Swabian-Alemannic Fastnacht. However, Fastnachtshexen already have been around since the 18th century in Tirol. Another character, that was popular in the Fastnacht, is the alte Vettel. Since the Middle Ages, the alte Vettel was played by men in women's clothing, who would joke and jump around, based on the motto "Topsy-Turvy World".

=== Fasnacht in Helvetia, West Virginia (USA) ===
The small Swiss-German enclave of Helvetia, West Virginia, was founded by immigrants in 1869, shortly after the U.S. Civil War. The celebration of Fasnacht (a spelling unique to the town’s Swiss-German roots, locally pronounced as "faz-nakt") continues to be the hallmark of Helvetia's cultural calendar. While the European parent tradition is often rendered Fastnacht (meaning 'Fasting Night'), the Helvetian spelling reflects the Swiss-Alemannic dialect of its founders. Isolated by the rugged terrain of the Appalachian Mountains, the community preserved a unique "Alpine-Appalachian" hybrid culture that remains one of the most authentic survivals of the Fastnacht tradition in North America. Unlike the large-scale parades of the Rhineland, Helvetia’s Fasnacht is an intimate, immersive experience that culminates on the Saturday before Ash Wednesday. The day is defined by several key stages:

1. The Masquerade and "Judging of the Masks" - It is tradition for everyone to wear a mask; those who don't are often jokingly teased or "swept" away by the jesters.
2. The Lantern Parade at Dusk - Processional through the snowy, unlit streets of the village that leads to the community hall.
3. The Square Dance - Alpine-Appalachian fusion in motion, provided by the Helvetia Star Band, which has existed in various forms for over a century.

The most significant departure from standard Swabian-Alemannic tradition is the inclusion of a Sechseläuten-inspired ritual. A large effigy known as Old Man Winter is suspended from the ceiling of the community hall during the dance. At midnight, the effigy is cut down, carried outside, and ritually burned on a massive bonfire. This act serves as a symbolic "exorcism" of the harsh mountain winter, a practice that resonates deeply with the local agricultural cycle.

== Characters ==
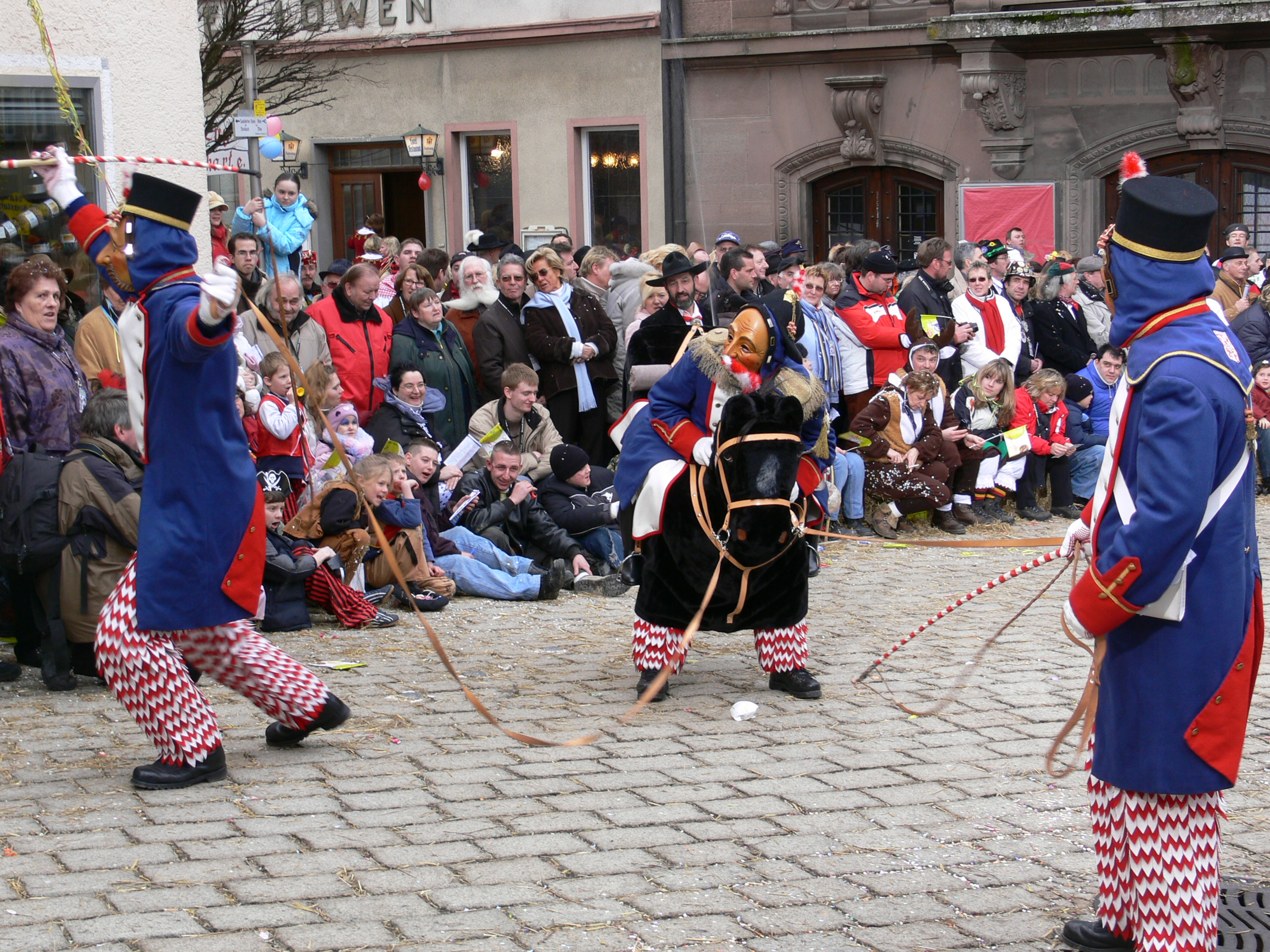
The carnival figure Fastnetsbutzerössle of the guild Altdorf-Weingarten

The Swabian-Allemannic Fastnacht has gained a vast number of different characters. When they perform they usually appear in homogenous groups of one type of character. However, there are a few groups that consist of various characters. In most cases they interact with each other. A popular way of interaction is the tradition of the driver. Here, an animal character is chastised by a group of characters that are covered by masks and equipped with a whip. These specific types of masks are called Häs. Examples for this particular tradition are the Fastnetsbutzerössle in Weingarten, the Brieler Rößle in Rottweil and Werners Esel in Bad Waldsee. In some areas there are exclusive characters, which often play a central part in the local Fastnacht tradition. Over the course of time entire character families have been developed through these special characters. The members of such families hold certain characteristics and functions. One example is the Gole in Riedlingen.

=== Daemon figures ===
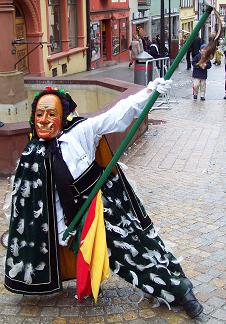
Federehannes from Rottweil, one of the oldest known devil figures

Daemon figures may well be counted among the oldest figures of traditional Fasnacht. Some of the costumes (called "Kleidle" in German) are several hundred years old, like the Schuttig of Elzach, a devilish figure that used to be widespread in parts of the Black Forest. Today, these daemons often also play the solitary part of a warlock, for example in Offenburg's guild of witches. And Triberg's Fastnacht is dominated by a devil figure that was created in the 19th century.

=== Jesters ===
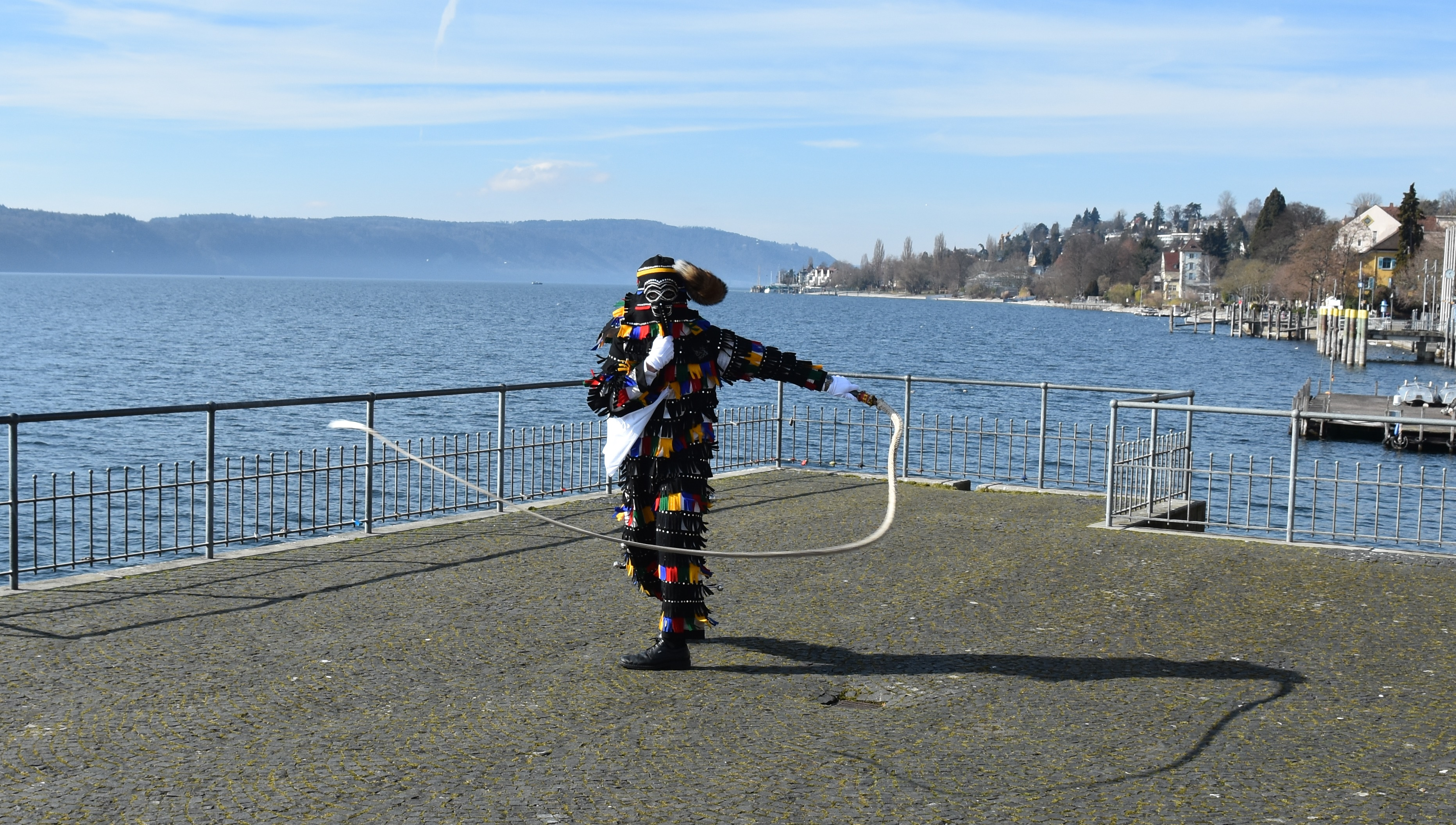
Der Ueberlinger Haensele is snapping his Karbatsche (whip)

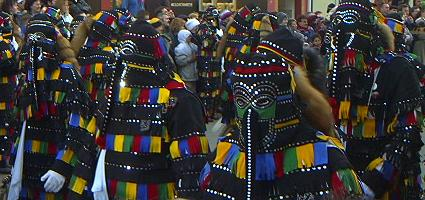
Überlinger Hänsele with textile masks

Narren (Jesters) probably appeared at the same time like demon figures and in various forms. In the Baar region, the "Weißnarr", (white jester), for instance, is common. One of the oldest figures of Fastnacht though are the "Narro" from Villingen, also called the "aristocrat of Alemannic Fastnacht", or the "Hansel" from Donaueschingen, Hüfingen, Immendingen and Bräunlingen. Other jesters with a long tradition are the "Biß" From Rottweil and its pendants. The aforementioned "Weißnarr" is mostly represented by men but some are accompanied by a female companion during parades, who often either don't wear any costume or a plain traditional and regional one. The "Weißnarren's" costume is made of a white linen garment, which is elaborately depainted or embroidered. Compared with the "Weißnarr's" baroque elegance, jesters such as the "Blätzlenarr" or the "Spättlenarr" and "Fleckennarr" may look a bit earthy, an impression which might also be caused by their costume, which is made of old fabric remnants. Due to increasing wealth nowadays though, many costumes are being designed more elaborate. Single pieces of a costumes' fabric, for instance, are blind-stitched manually. Nevertheless, the "Flecklenarren's'" costumes and masques have been elabouratively refined during baroque and thus a new group of jesters, called "Fransennarren" which are to be found until today in several cities celebrating Svabian-Alemannic Fastnacht, emerged. One example of a "Blätzlenarr" is Der Überlinger Hänsele, which is the carnival figure of the city of "Überlingen". There is a geographical difference between the Svabian-Alemannic jesters though, hence in some regions the masques are mainly made of cloth whereas they are mainly made of wood in others. A group of jesters called "Spättlehansel" presents a particular rarity within Svabian-Alemannic jesters since their masks are equipped with a moveable mandible. Yet another group of jesters near to the Swiss border called the "Narro-Altfischerzunft" in Laufenburg not only possess south-western Germany's oldest noted masque made of wood, but also had been developing a positively aristocratic self-image over the centuries. Coming from Italy and connected to the Carnival's triumph in the 18th and 19th century, the figure "Bajazzo" emerged and influenced some Svabian-Alemannic figures like e.g. the "Rössle- and Schellenhansele". Due to that, those figures use to carry bells, a pig's bladder or mirrors at parades until today.

=== Legendary figures ===
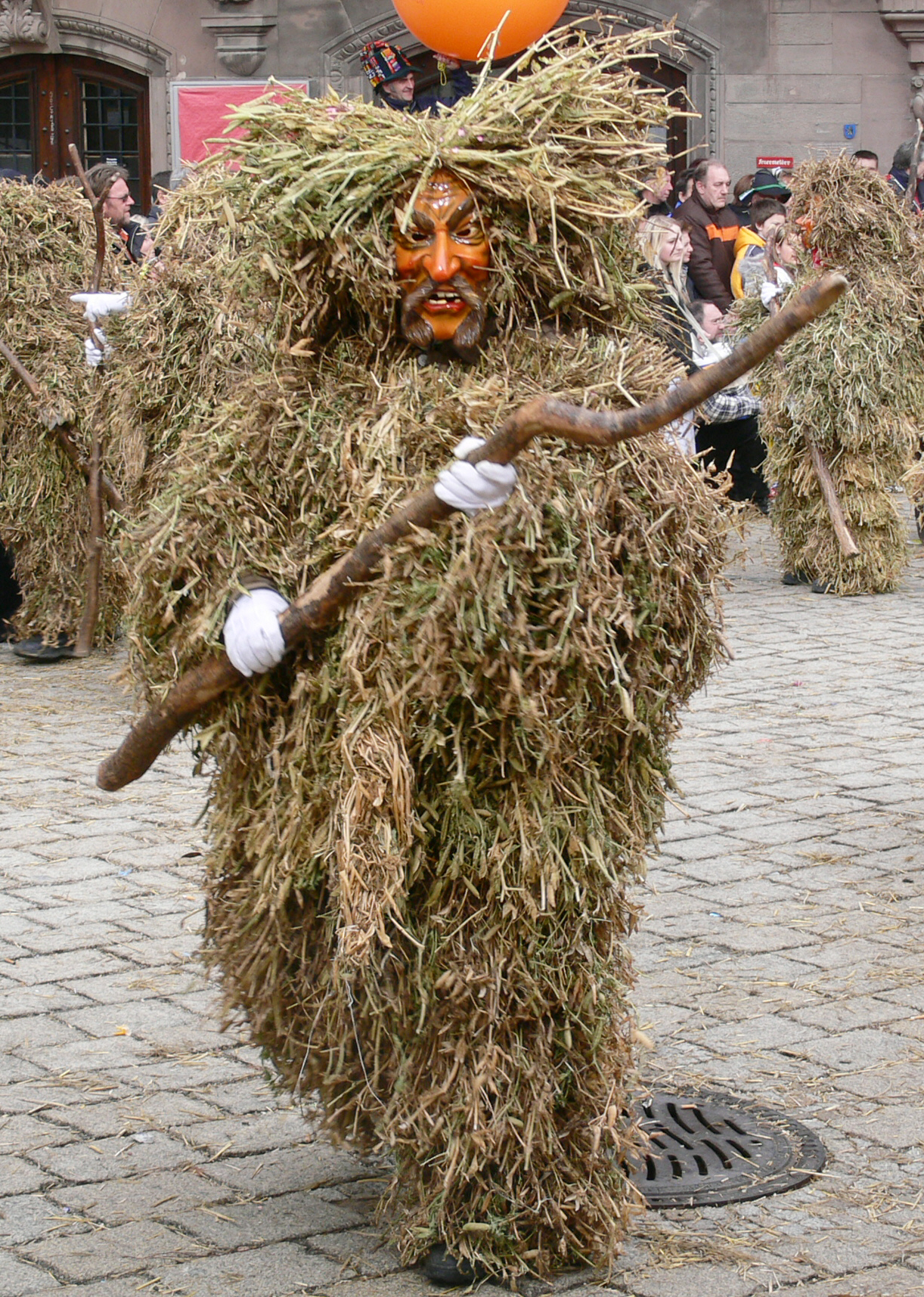
"Hooriger Bär" (hairy bear) of the Poppelezunft Singen

One could also say that a lot of the post-war newly created Fastnacht figures attribute to the Wild Peoples (Wilde Leute). The legendary figures often allude to local stories or past events in history. Most of the younger Jester Guilds lace their newly created figures into current local customs by telling a legend or story related to the old traditions.

=== Witches ===
The same also often holds true for witches, discussed above.

=== Animal figures ===
In addition to the Hairy Bears (hoorigen Bären), there is the Night Raven (der Nachtkrabb), a bird-like figure that also belongs to the carnival characters of the Murrhardt Jester Guild. They can be found on a mural in the Murrhardt Monastery.

=== Maschker ===
At several places along the Danube, there are several small groups of carnival revelers who appear to be masked and represent themselves differently. This can particularly be observed in restaurants or the roads of Ehingen, Mühlheim, and Munderkingen. Traditionally, it is mostly women who wear these masks that appear with a slogan. Usually, small presents, so called Kromet, are given to unmasked passers-by. The tradition of the Maschkers is several centuries old. Most figures came into existence with the introduction of clubs and a more organised Fasnacht. Hence, Maschkers often appear along with organised Fasnacht activities, but are not an organised addition.

== Customs ==
=== Fools' calls ===
The Swabian-Alemannic Fastnacht fools' calls are more recent and analogous to the traditional battle cries (Alaaf, Helau, Ahoy, ...) of the large carnival cities. The fools traditionally greet others with a shriek of delight, something they explain to be a spontaneous expression of joy, which could be documented in writing as "Ju-Hu-Hu-Hu". In Rottweil and a few others the fool's call kept the original form (Hu-Hu-Hu). Elsewhere certain fools' calls emerged from the Fastnachts since World War II, and from time to time even became an identifying feature of the carnival. The most well-known call of the Swabian-Alemannic Fastnacht is "Narri-Narro", where the masked figures call out to the civilians.

The fools' calls are unique and different depending on the places and guilds which they are from.

=== Narrenmarsch ===
The events of the Fastnacht are often accompanied by dedicated music, the so-called Narrenmärsche

== Switzerland ==
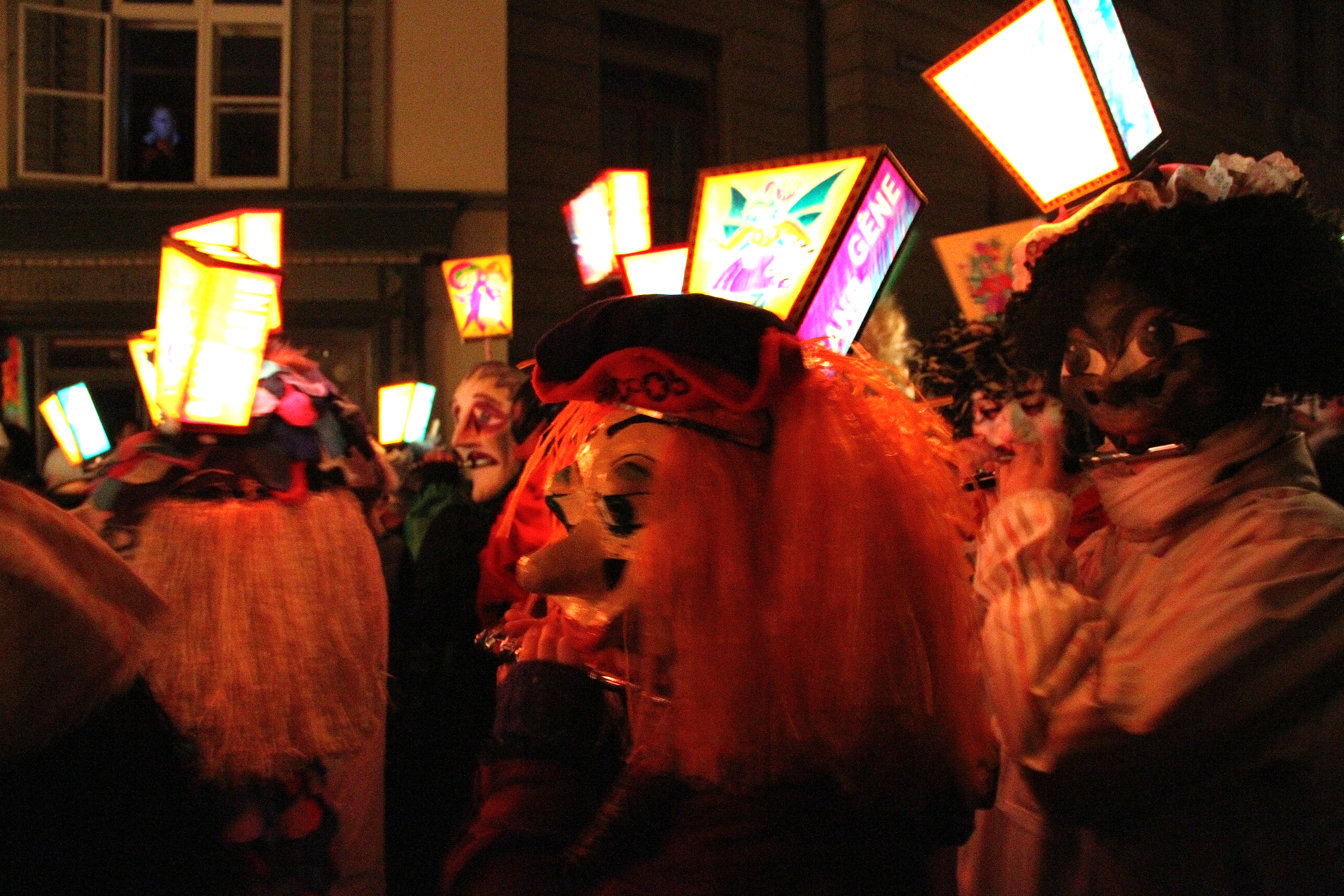
Morgestraich in Basel (2013)

- Basel (Basler Fasnacht): Schnitzelbangg

In protestant Basel, Fasnacht begins on the Monday after Ash Wednesday, since it has been existing since its many re-inventions before and after the Reformation, in its current form since about 1835. Since then, it is considered to be a civil Fasnacht, quite contrary to the other large Fasnacht events in the Catholic cantons of Switzerland, mainly the one in Lucerne. The Basler Fasnacht starts with the Morgestraich when, at 4am, all the lights go out in the city and carnival participants walk through the streets with beautifully painted lanterns, costumes and typically big-nosed masks, accompanied by drummers and pipers playing piccolos. The festival continues for three days with events for children and displays of floats.

- Bernese Fassnacht
- Liestal (Chienbäse)
- Lucerne (Lozärner Fasnacht)

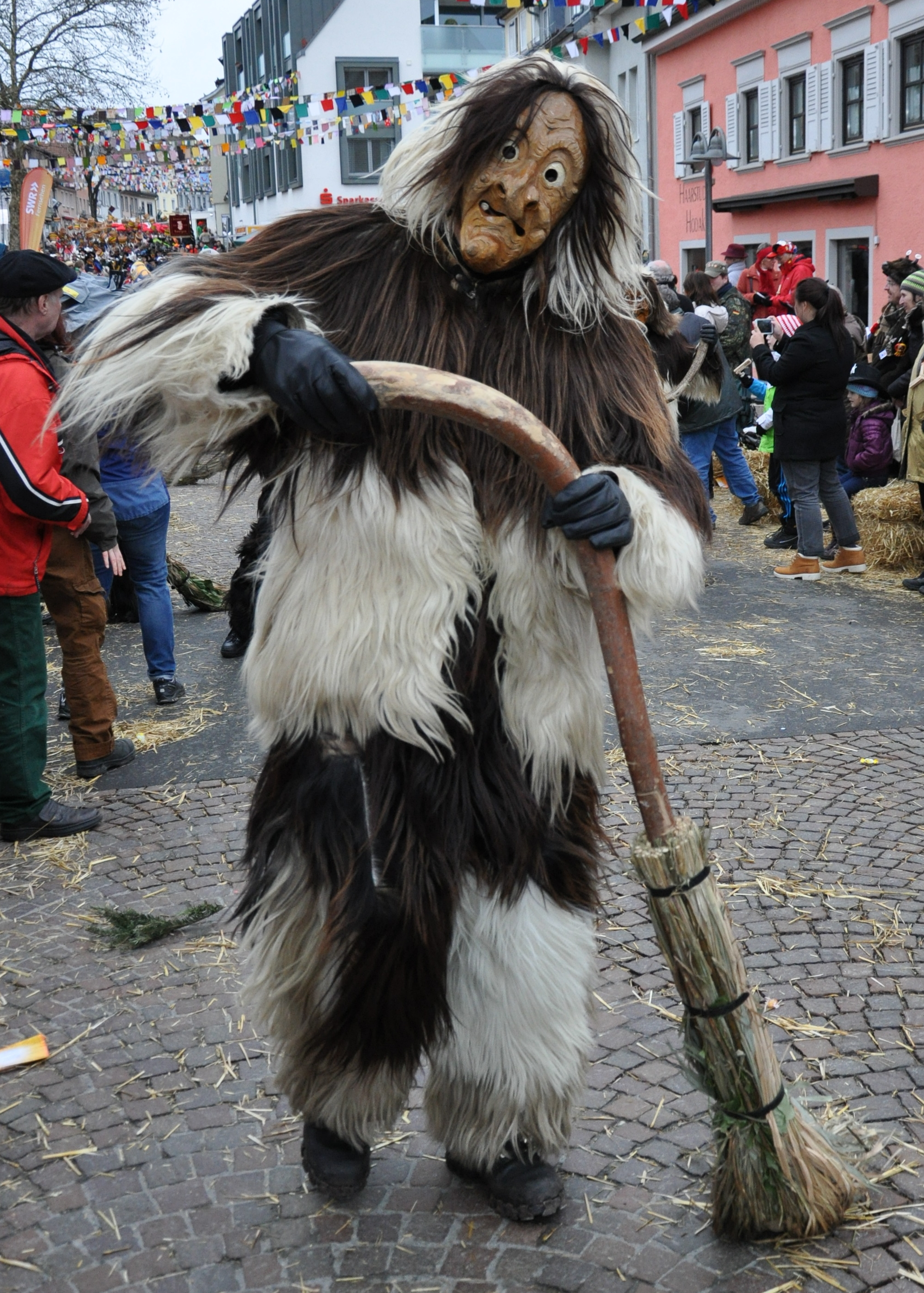
Fasnacht in Willisau (2012)

The Lucerner Fasnacht, based on religious, Catholic backgrounds, starts every year on the Thursday before Aschermittwoch (Ash Wednesday) with a big bang at 5am called Morgenwacht (Morning Watch). There are big parades in the afternoon on Schmotzige Donnerstag (literally: Lardy Thursday) and the following Monday, called Güdismontag (literally: Paunch Monday), which attract tens of thousands of people. Lucerne's Carnival ends with a crowning finish on Güdisdienstag (literally: Paunch Tuesday) evening with a tremendous parade of big bands, lights and lanterns with even a larger audience. Quite contrary to the Basler Fasnacht, a large part of the audience are also dressed up in costumes, especially in the evenings.

- Solothurn
- Olten
- Rapperswil (Eis-zwei-Geissebei)

== See also ==
- Carnival of Basel
- Carnaval (in the Netherlands)
- Der Überlinger Hänsele
- Fasnacht (observances in the United States)
- Guggenmusik
- Pre-Christian Alpine traditions
