= Der Überlinger Hänsele =

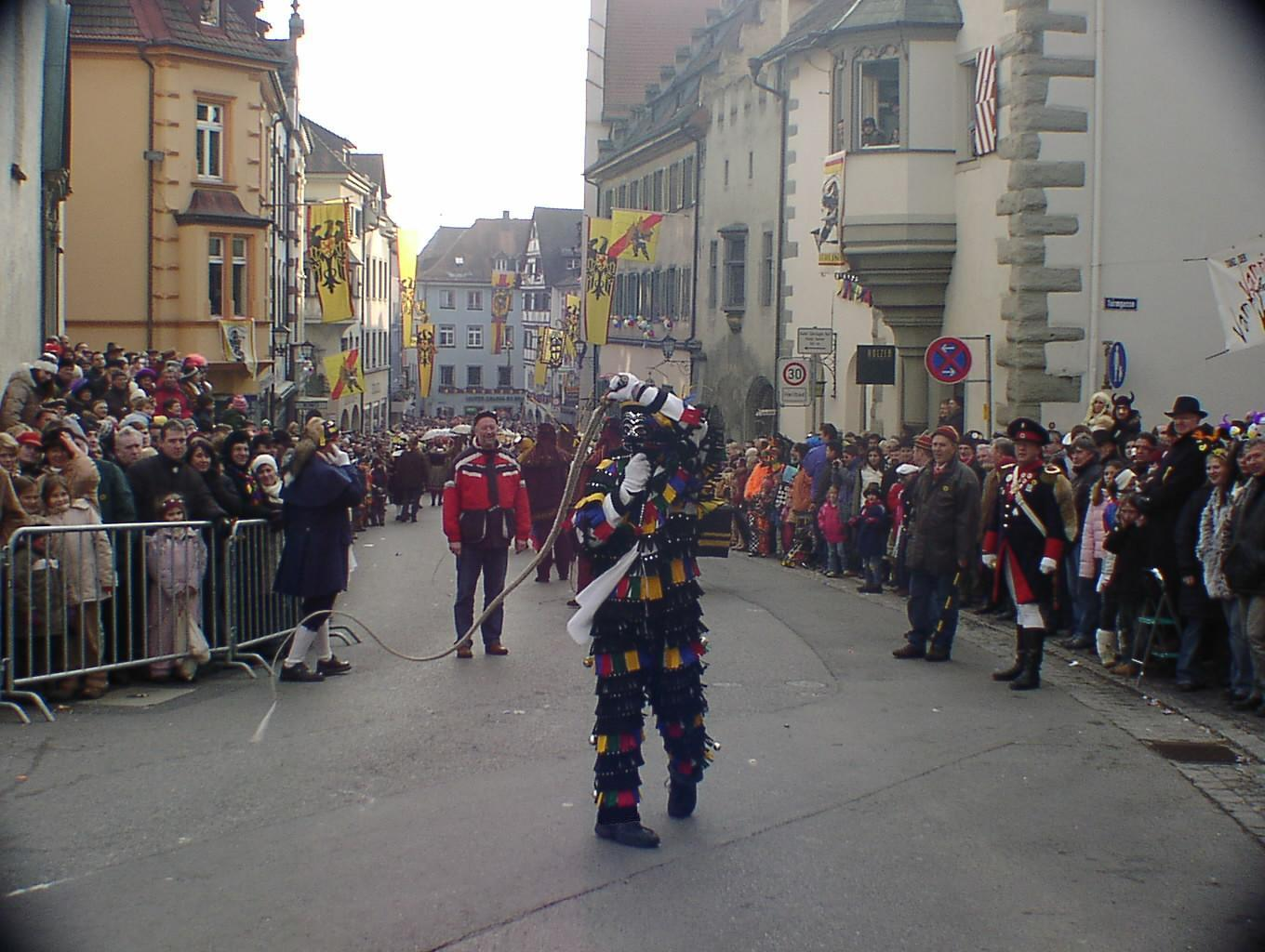
Überlinger Hänsele in 2006

The Überlinger Hänsele is a famous carnival figure of the city of Überlingen am Bodensee, Germany.

The Hänsele is the main figure of the carnival in Überlingen. Only male citizens of Überlingen are allowed to appear with this carnival suit on. The first time the Hänsele appears during carnival is the Saturday evening before Ash Wednesday for the big "Hänsele Juck" (procession of the Hänsle through the old city of Überlingen). More than 1500 of these Hänsele entertain the audience along the street.

== Appearance ==
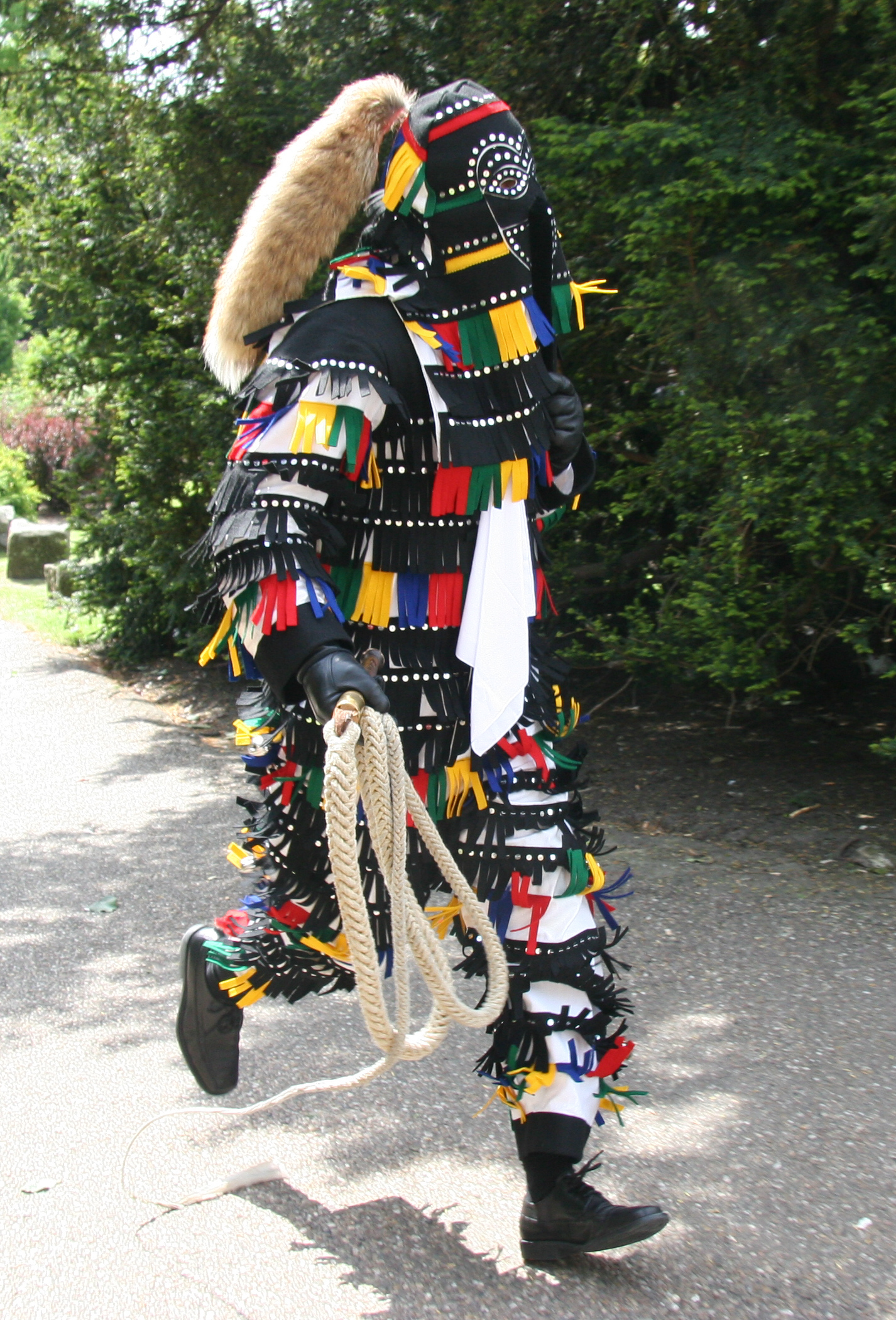
Überlinger Hänsele in 2008

The character Hänsele appears on the Saturday and Sunday before Ash Wednesday. It also appears in July in connection with the Überlinger Schwerttanzkompanie (Sword dance company of Überlingen) at the second Schwedenprozession (a procession to commemorate the successful defense of the Swedish siege in the Thirty years War) on the second Sunday in July. During the sword dance only one person at a time plays Hänsele, and he is involved in all civic celebrations; his identity usually remains anonymous. Hänsele's costume is noted for its colorful felted squares, its fox tail, and the women's perfume worn on the mask. In addition, Hänsele carries a heavy whip; prior to Fasnet, groups of uncostumed Hänseles gather in the market square to practice snapping their whips.

== History ==
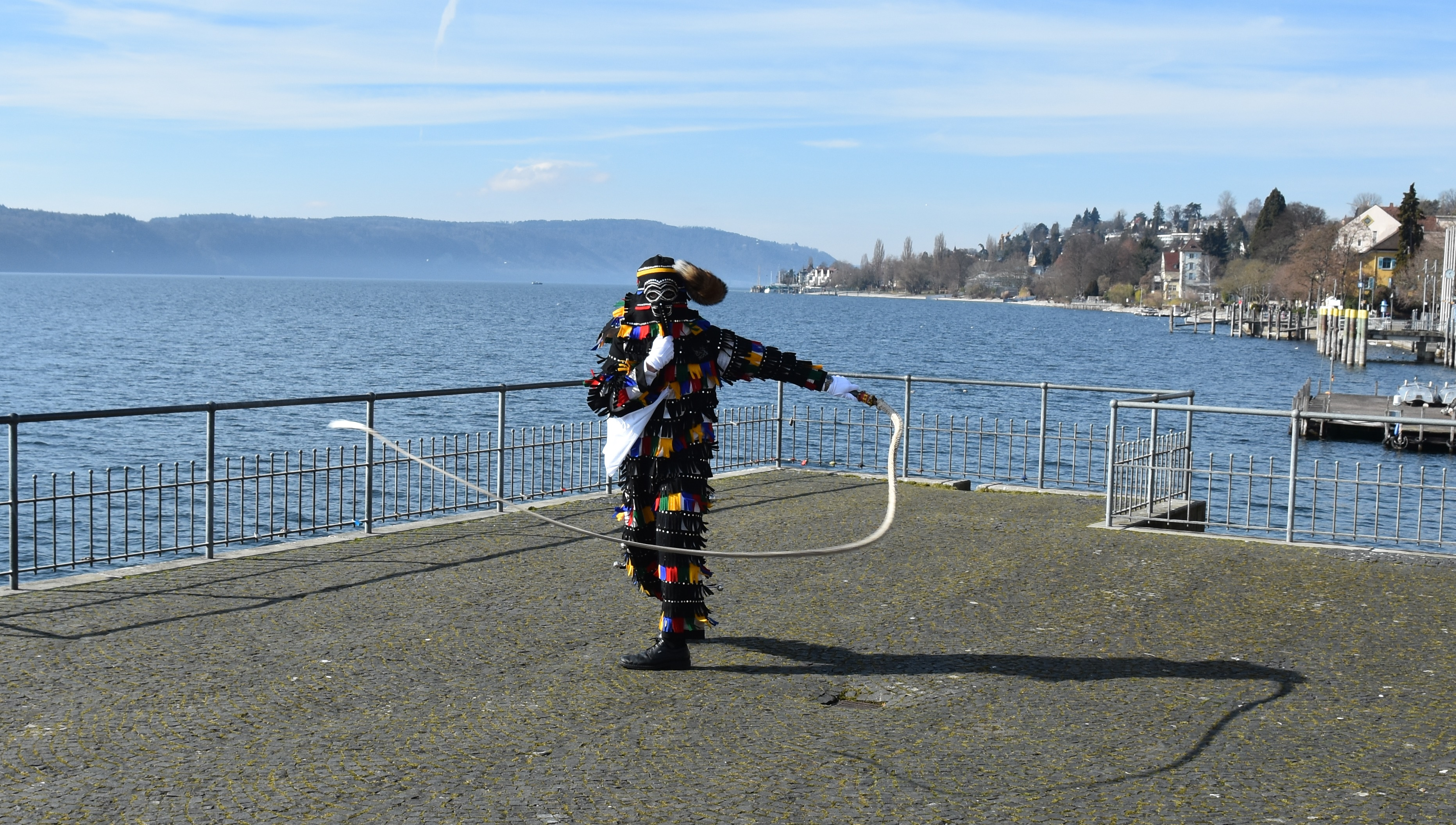
Der Ueberlinger Haensele is snapping his Karbatsche (whip)

In 1496, the Hänsele was first mentioned in a legislative ruling that banned people from wearing a devil suit, though it is unknown if that devil suit was similar in appearance to the modern Hänsele. In 1769, the Hänsele was named in connection with the carnival for the first time by the council of Überlingen. It is written there that it was forbidden to wear the Hänsele after the bedtime ringing of the church bells. In the council protocol of 1789, the Karbatsche was named and banned as well.
