= Basel Carnival =

Annual carnival in Basel, Switzerland

Basel Carnival Basler Fasnacht
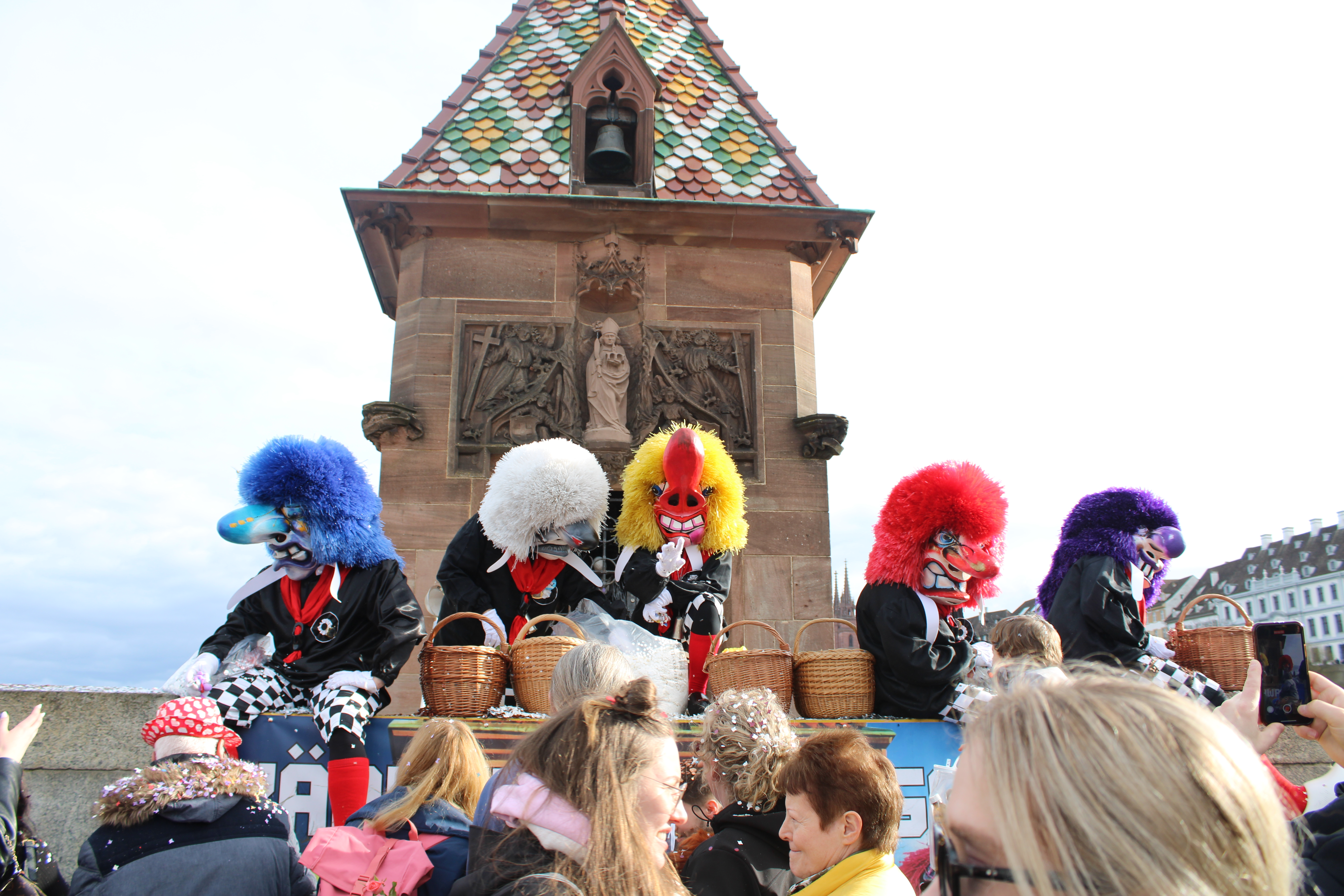
- Genre: Carnival
- Frequency: Annual
- Locations: Basel, Switzerland

Basel Carnival
- UNESCO Intangible Cultural Heritage
- Country: Switzerland
- Reference: 01262
- Region: Europe and North America

Inscription history
- Inscription: 2017 (12th session)
- List: Representative

The Basel Carnival (German: Basler Fasnacht) is the biggest carnival in Switzerland. Basler Fasnacht takes place annually between February and March in Basel. It has been listed as one of the top fifty local festivities in Europe.

Since 2017, the Carnival of Basel has been included in UNESCO's intangible cultural heritage.

== Overview ==
Basler Fasnacht 2024

Basler Fasnacht 2024

The Basler Fasnacht starts on the Monday after Ash Wednesday at precisely 4:00 am with the so-called Morgestraich (see below). The carnival lasts for exactly 72 hours and, therefore, ends on Thursday morning at 4:00 am. During this time the Fasnächtler (the participants) dominate the old town of central Basel, running free in the streets and restaurants. Basler Fasnacht is often referred to as die drey scheenschte Dääg ("the three most beautiful days").

Unlike the Carnival celebrations held in other cities on the Rhine (such as those in Cologne, Mainz and Düsseldorf), the Basel Carnival features a clear and well-maintained separation between participants and the spectators who line the streets.

In addition, since the 19th century, the Basler Fasnacht event has provided satirical commentary on current local and global events.

== Components of the Fasnacht ==
=== Costumes ===
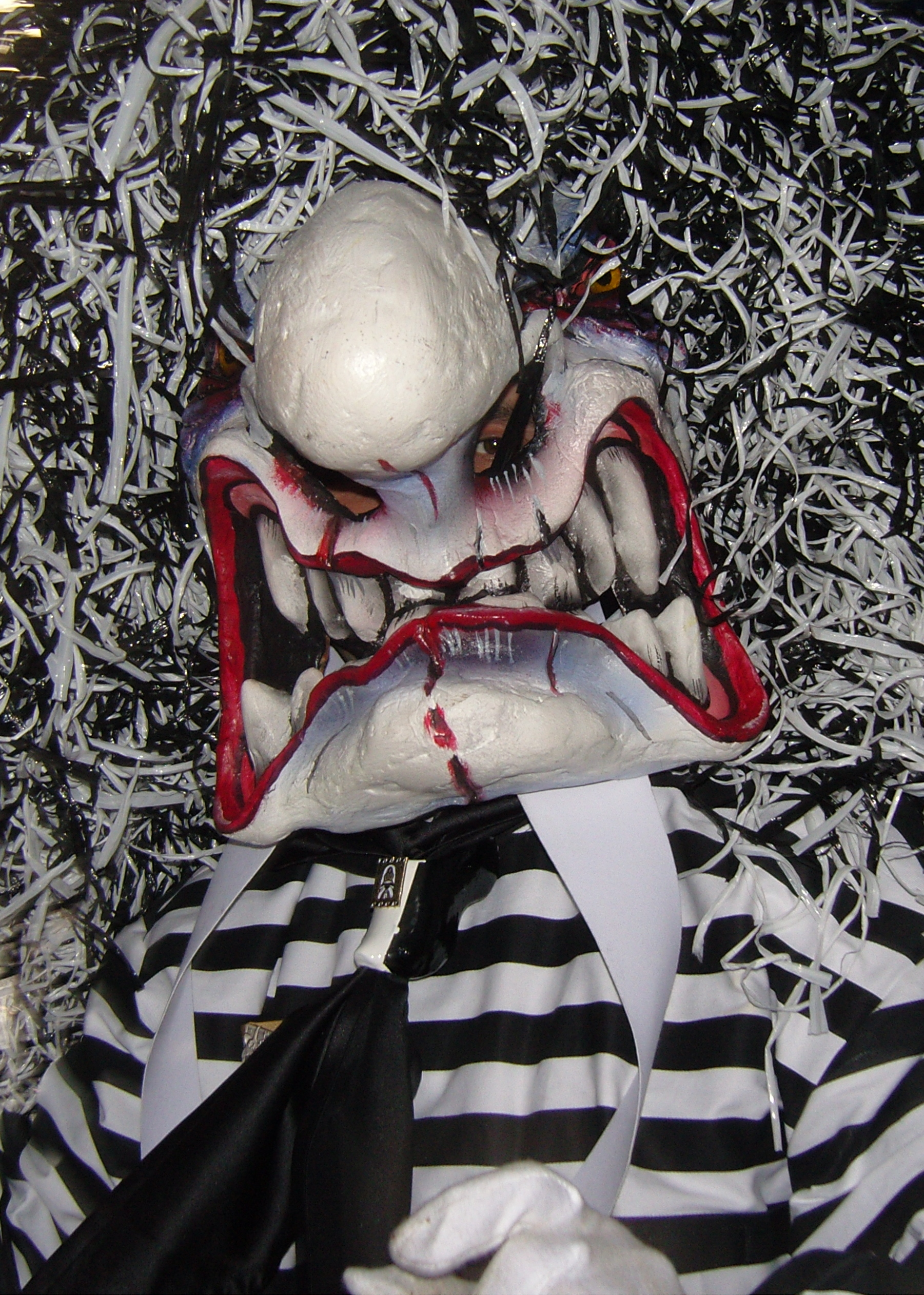
Traditional Waggislarve masks used at the Carnival of Basel

The approximately 18,000 active Fasnächtler dress up in a wide variety of costumes, including a mask known as a Larve. Participants are fully concealed and must remain incognito while parading; it is considered inappropriate and a breach of protocol to identify oneself by removing the mask, other than during official breaks from the parade. Members of the various Cliques wear costumes that fit a specific theme, except during Morgestreich and on Fasnacht Tuesday. Costumes and masks commonly represent famous people including politicians, or even comic characters or animals. More traditional masks recall Napoleonic soldiers, harlequins (Harlekin), the famous Waggis (buffoons portraying an exaggerated caricature of Alsatian peasants), and the figure of the Alti Dante (old dame), an upper-class elderly woman.

=== Cortège ===
The parades taking place on Monday and Wednesday afternoon are called Cortège and follow two defined ring routes: the inner ring runs clockwise, and the outer ring runs counterclockwise. The two routes are sometimes referred to as the blue and the red route because of their colour representation on the route map. The Fasnächtler who participate in the parade generally toss confetti into the crowds, and hand out candy and other treats to the spectators.

=== Sujet ===
Most of the groups choose a Sujet (French: theme) for the Fasnacht. These Sujets are usually related to recent events and are highly satirical. These Sujets can be seen on lanterns during Morgenstreich and in the costumes worn by Clique members during the Cortège. Most Cliques also distribute Zeedel (flyers containing ironic verse).

=== Räppli (Confetti) ===
In the Basel German dialect, confetti are called Räppli. According to some local historians, the throwing of confetti is a typical tradition from Basel that later spread to the rest of the world. While there is no proof for this theory, the amount of confetti used during Basler Fasnacht is huge in comparison to other carnivals.

Originally, sweets in the form of small sugar balls known as confetti (an Italian name, similar to the English confectionery) were given away or thrown at the crowd during the parade. After this practice was prohibited in the 19th century, small shards of paper were used as a replacement. Until it was banned in the second half of the 20th century, it was also common to use straw instead of confetti, although wheat chaff is still sometimes thrown in some of the outlying towns and regions.

Only single-coloured Räppli (confetti) can be purchased in Basel. Räppli is available in all possible colours, but never mixed. This was decided by the regional confetti manufacturers to prevent the once-common practice of reselling "used" confetti. Throwing mixed confetti is seen as very bad form, since one would have picked it up from the street, which is obviously an unhygienic practice.

For spectators, there is the ever-present danger of being attacked from behind by a confetti-throwing Waggis, especially if not wearing a Carnival badge (see below) known as a Blaggedde (which sounds similar to plaquette to French and English listeners). It is an unwritten law that masked and/or costumed participants are not subject to confetti attacks.

By the evening, the routes of the Cortège are ankle-deep in confetti. Even so, Basel's sanitation department succeeds in clearing away this mess within two hours during the night, so, by the following morning, there is little evidence of the previous day's events.

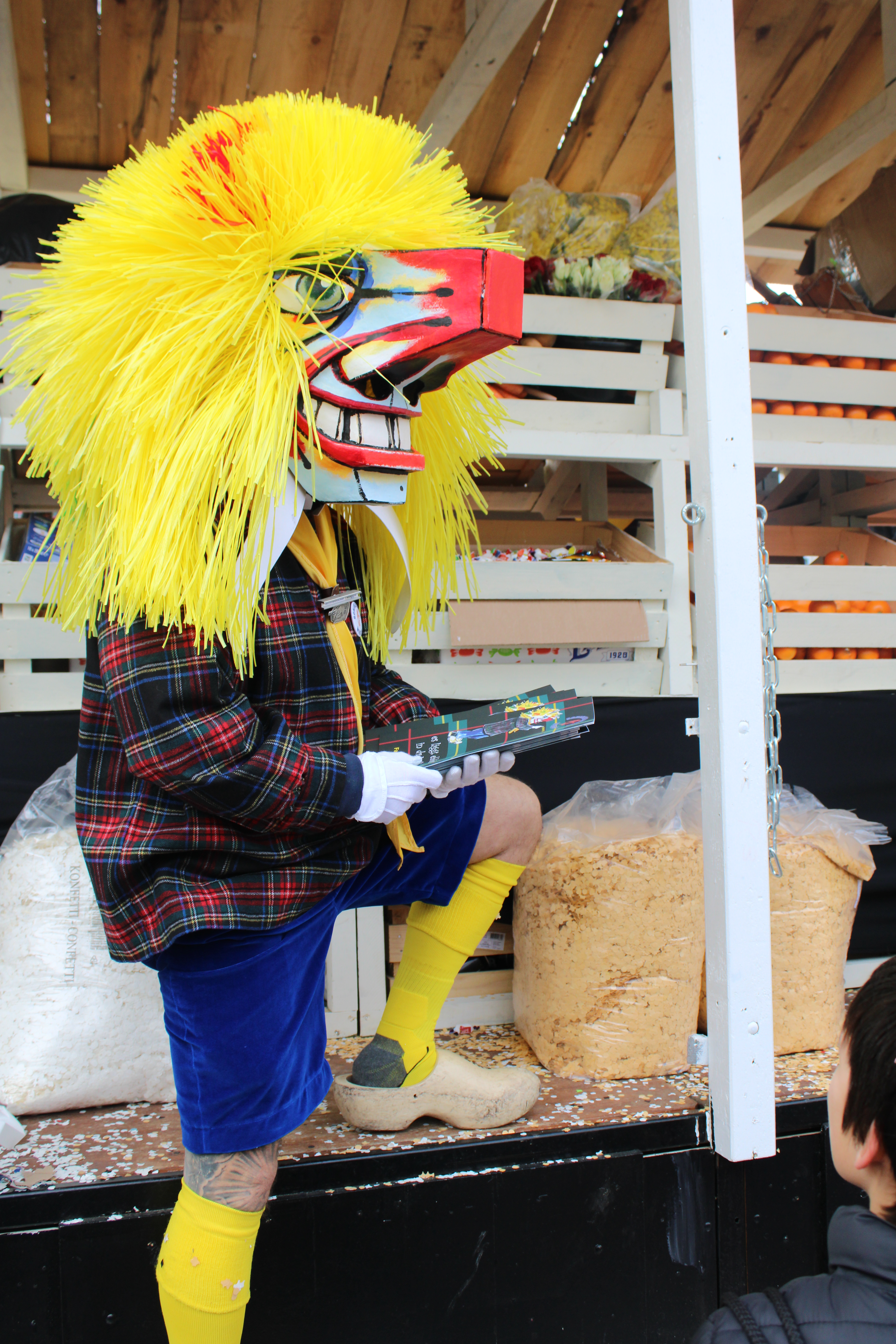
Fasnacht Waggis giving away texts on the sujet written by his Clique

== Groups ==
At the Basel Carnival there are five major groups of participants.

=== Cliques ===
One of the oldest formations are the Cliques, who march through the old town playing the piccolo and basler drum. A Clique usually consists of a Vortrab (vanguard), the Pfeifer (piccoloflutes), the Tambourmajor (drum major) and the Tambouren (drummers). Except on the Cortège, the Cliques do not follow fixed routes, and it is thus very common for different Cliques to cross paths. In that case, one Clique will stop and let the other Clique pass. Spectators, on the other hand, will be politely guided off the route by the Vortrab.

=== Gugge (brass band) ===
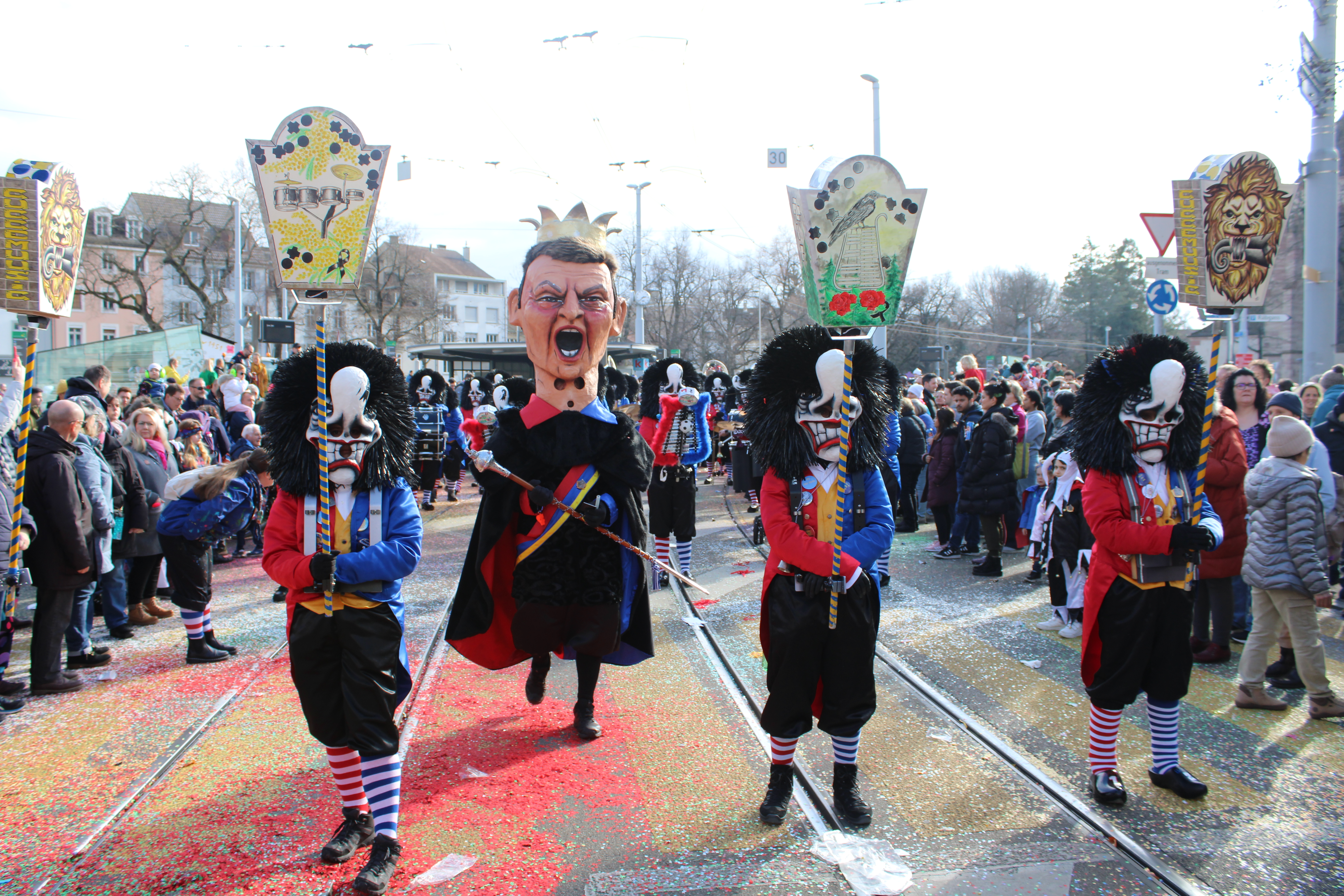
A Gugge (brass band)

Brass band marching through Basler old town during Basler Fasnacht

Marching brass bands playing Guggenmusik are another formation present during Carnival. Although the Guggemusik groups do not participate on Morgestreich, they march and play throughout Fasnacht, starting with the Cortège on Monday, and are showcased on Tuesday night when they perform in Guggekonzerts in various locations.

=== Schnitzelbank singers ===
The Schnitzelbank singer is a bard that sings satirical verses about current events in Basel or from around the world. The verses are sung in Swiss German and the singer will show Helge (illustrations) to the current verse. Similar verses are also distributed by the various Cliques in flyers known as Zeedel. The singers appear regularly in the restaurants and bars on Monday and Wednesday night and in the clique-cellars (local Clique meeting halls) on Tuesday.

=== Floats ===
During the Cortège, there are many trucks or tractors with decorated trailers. In these large trailers (Waage) are usually Waggis throwing oranges, sweets, flowers or other treats to (or at) the crowd. The Waggis also shower bystanders with copious amounts of confetti. The Waggis are an affectionate spoof on the Alsatian farmers who, in the distant past, regularly rolled up to Basel markets to sell produce. Some trucks are on display on the Kasernenareal from Monday night to Wednesday morning.

Similar to the Waage are the smaller carriages (Chaise / Schäse) with only 2–4 people giving away treats. Most of the people in the carriages, generally less rude than the Waggis, are dressed as old ladies and referred to as the Alti Tante (meaning "old aunt"), giving them a near-royal feeling.

=== Schyssdräggziigli ===
Many non-Clique individuals and small groups known as Schyssdräggziigli also wander through the streets. Like the Cliques, they play music with piccolos and drums.

== Events during the Fasnacht ==
=== Morgestraich ===
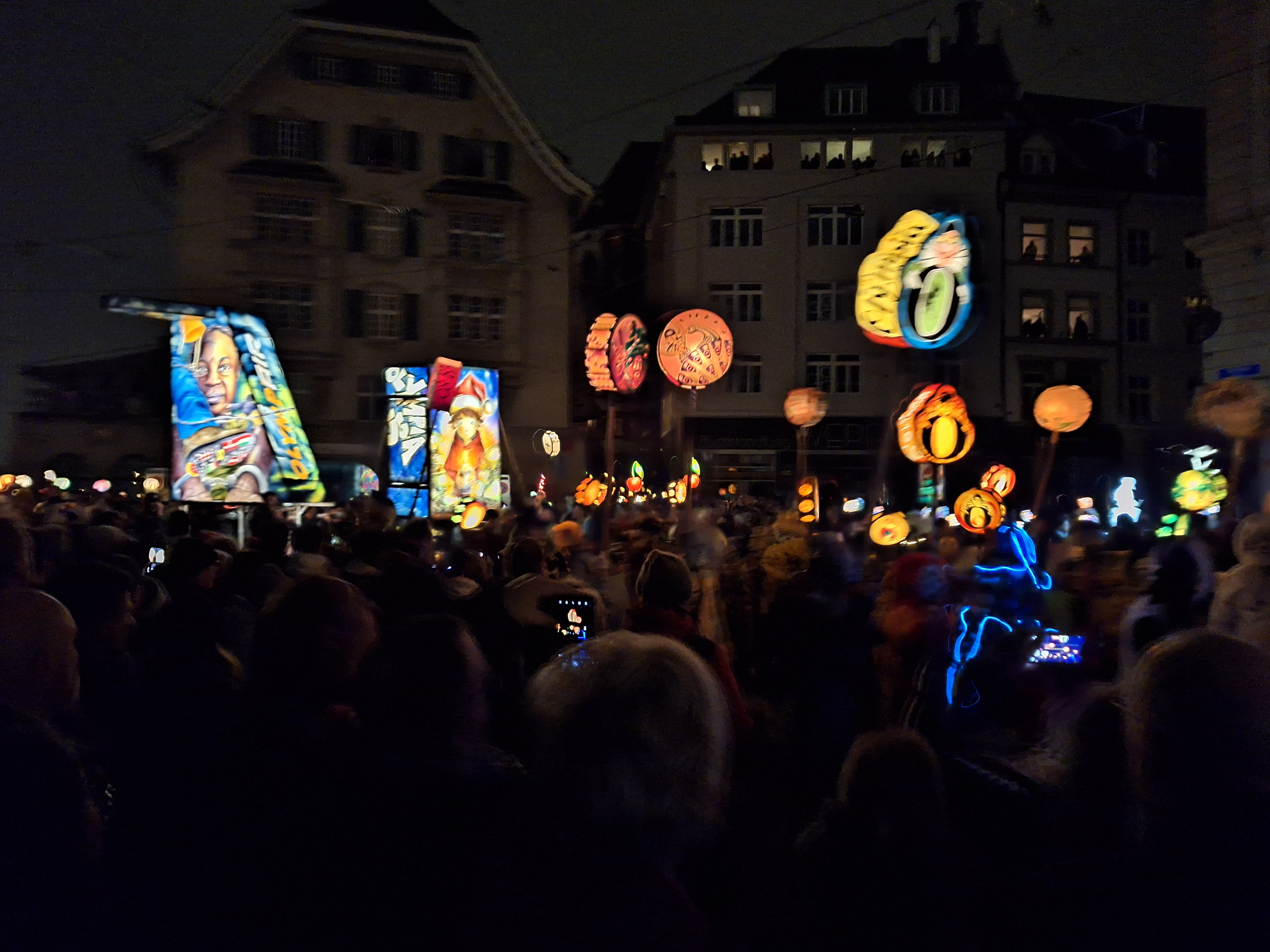
Basler Fasnacht, Morgestraích 2025

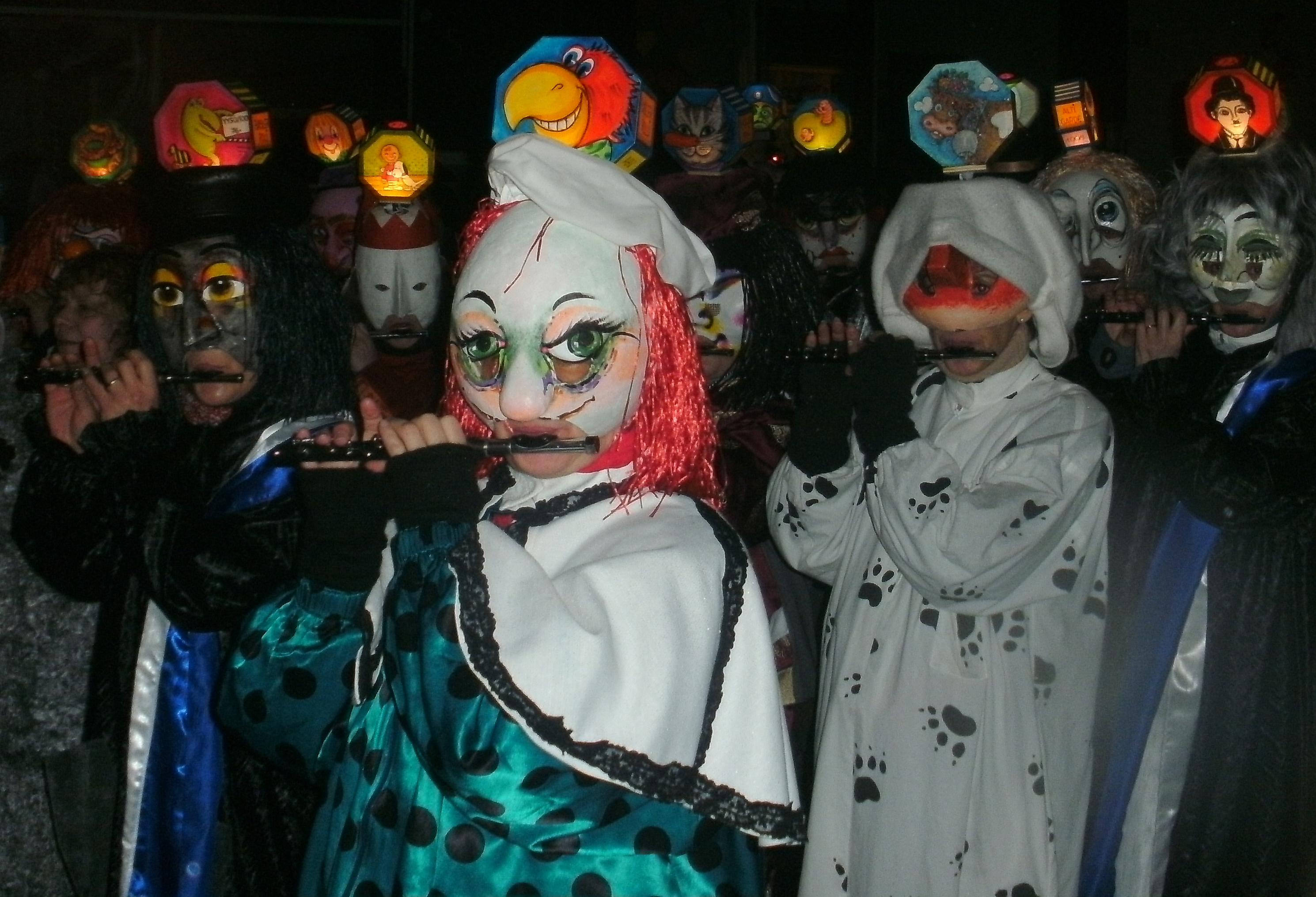
Morgestraich 2010, Piccolo player with small Kopflaterne

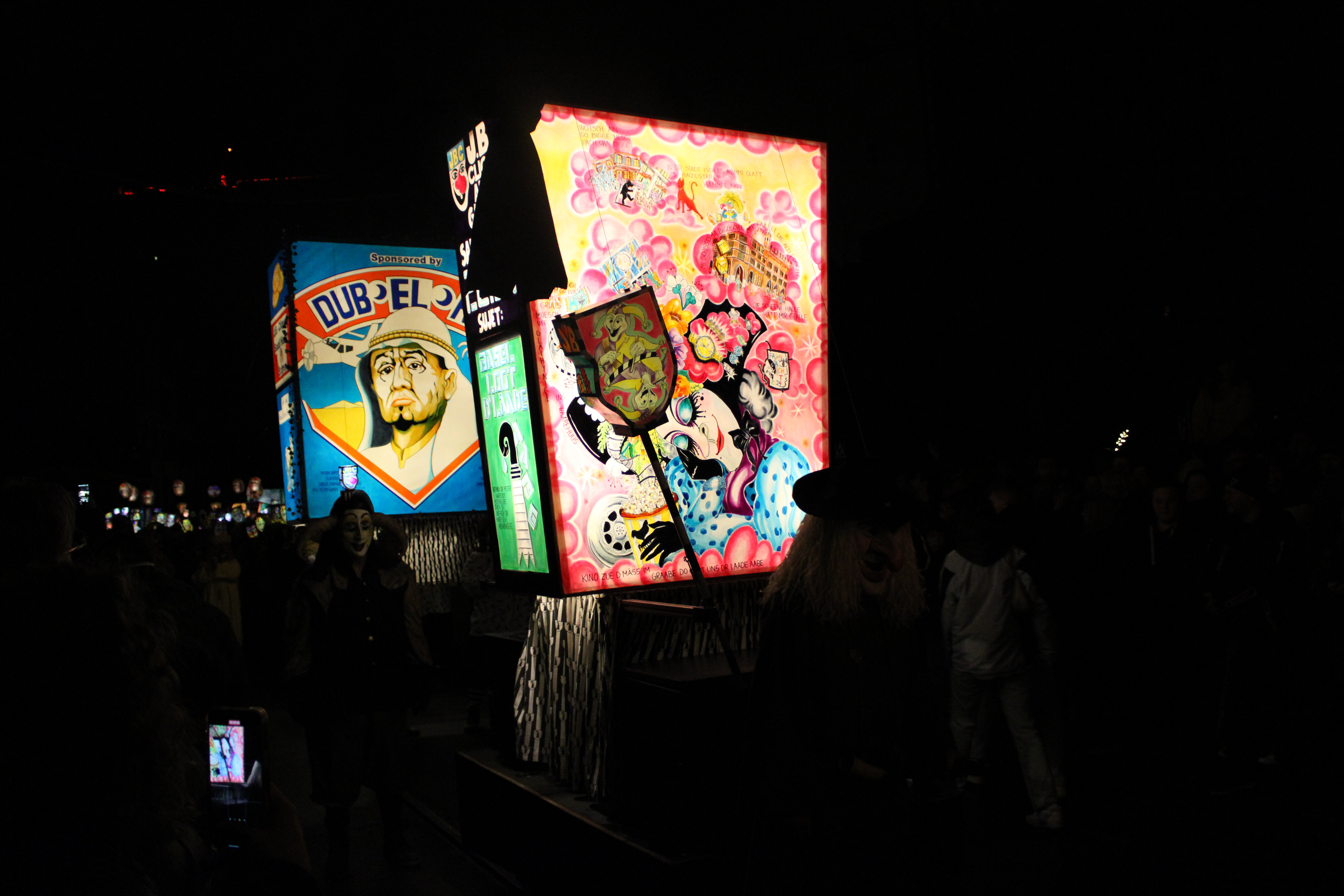
Morgestraich - Basler Fasnacht 2024

Morgestraich - Basler Fasnacht 2024

Morgestraich piccolo- Basler Fasnacht 2024

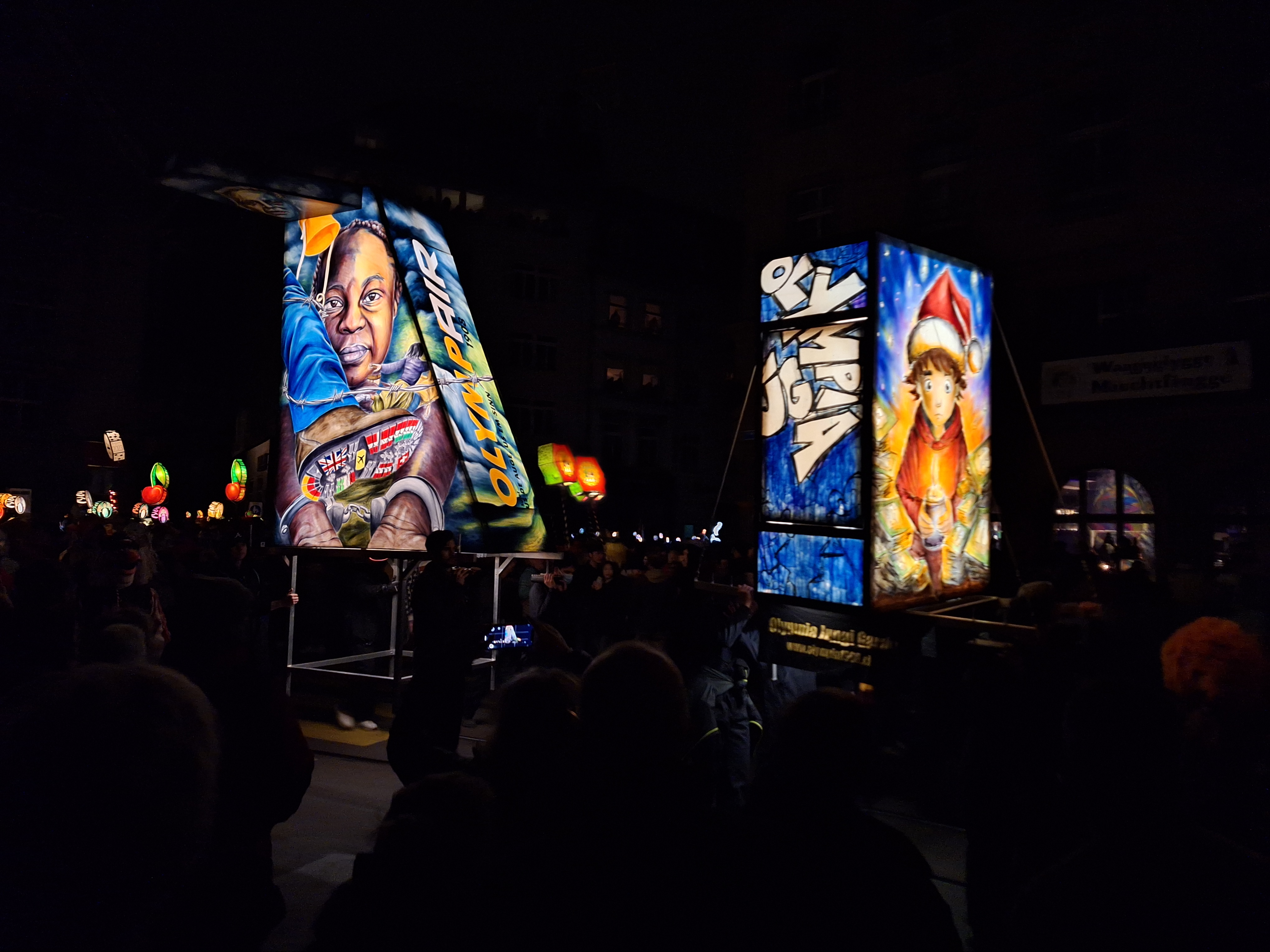
Basler Fasnacht Morgestraich 2025

The Morgestraich (in Basel dialect, Morgenstreich in High German) on Monday morning marks the beginning of the Carnival in Basel. At exactly 4 am, all the lights in the old town of Basel are turned off, and the Industrielle Werke Basel (the Industrial Works of Basel are the public utility organisation of the city) shuts down the streetlights. The only light remaining comes from the lanterns of the Cliques. There are two major types of lanterns, the large Zugslaterne (parade lanterns) that are wheel-mounted or carried by 2 to 4 people in front of the Cliques; and the head-mounted Kopflaterne (head lanterns) that every participant wears. Some Cliques have uniform Kopflaternen but traditionally during the Morgestraich, Clique members do not wear uniform costumes. This varied dressing is called "Charivari".

On the command "Morgestraich, vorwärts marsch!" ("Morgestraich, forward march!") from the drum majors, all Cliques begin to march and play the same march, the "Morgestraich", with their instruments. No Guggenmusik is played during Morgestraich.

From 4 am on Monday, many restaurants and bars in the old town open their doors and remain open for the following 72 hours. There, it is possible to sample traditional Basler carnival specialties, such as flour soup, Zwiebelkuchen and Käsewähe (a quiche-like baked dish).

=== Gugge concerts ===
On Tuesday evening, the areas around Marktplatz, Barfüsserplatz and Claraplatz are devoted to Guggekonzerts by the Guggemusik groups, who take turns to play on purpose-built stages to large crowds. The main Guggekonzert at Marktplatz draws thousands of spectators and is broadcast live by Telebasel, the local TV channel. The traditional Cliques, which march while playing piccolos and Basler snare drums, retreat to the side streets. The Guggemusik groups march through the city centre, then stop to play four to five songs and then move on. Some Guggemusik groups are also invited to play in cafés and restaurants to serenade the guests.

=== Children and Family Fasnacht ===
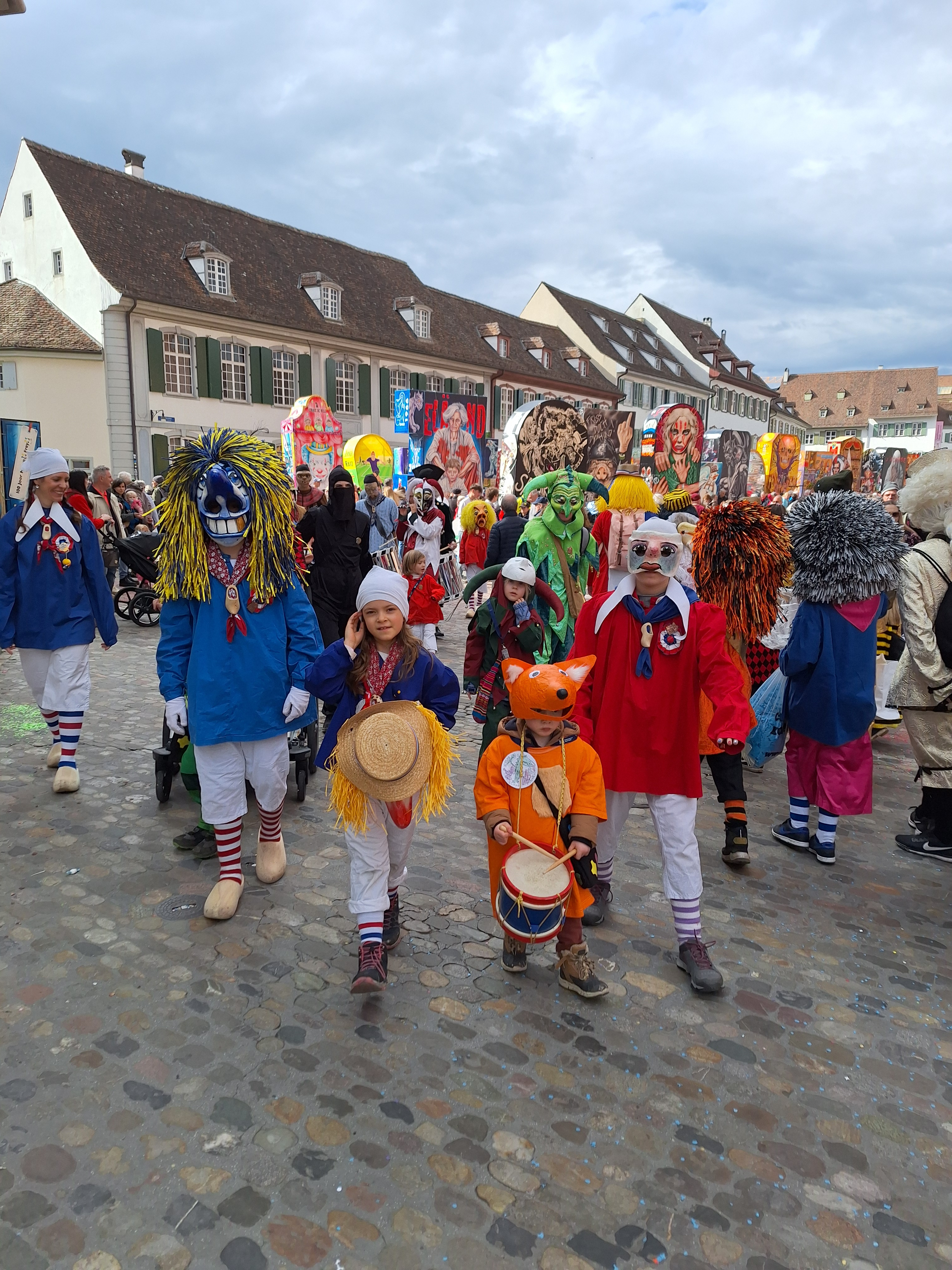
Basler Family Fasnacht, 2025

The Children and Family Fasnacht is on Tuesday. On this day, there are many parades through the city, but, this time, it is not the Cliques that take part, rather families with their children. If the people come from different Cliques, it is common to see groups with mixed costumes and masks.

It is not expected that the children, especially the youngest, will wear the heavy traditional masks.

=== Lantern Exhibition ===
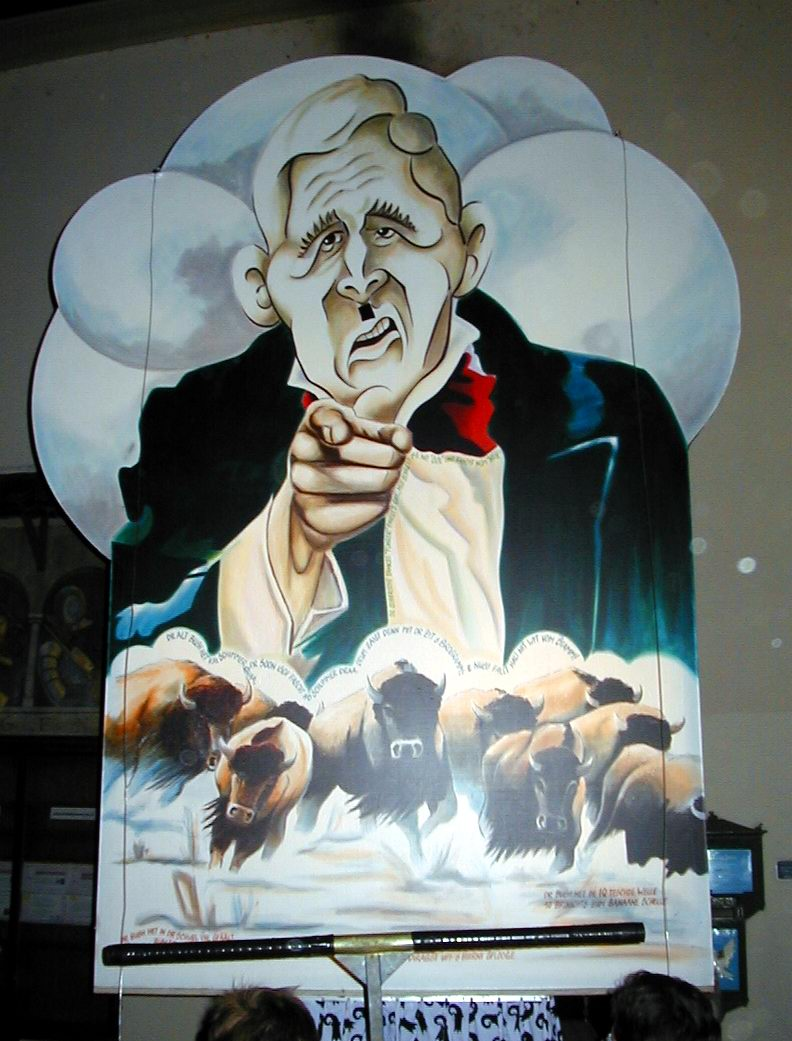
In 2003, George W. Bush was a famous sujet on the lanterns.

All lanterns are on display from Monday evening until Wednesday morning on the Münsterplatz (the square in front of the Basel Münster) and are lit in the evenings. The lantern exhibition is referred to as the largest open-air art exhibition of the world.

== Events around Fasnacht ==
There are a number of events that occur before and after Fasnacht. This is not a complete list, rather an overview of the larger or more significant events.

=== Pre-Fasnacht events ===
Before Fasnacht starts, various events (Vorfasnachtsveranstaltungen) take place. Some of them are used for experiments with the Fasnacht topic, such as Fasnachts-Musicals or concerts with traditional Fasnacht instruments and crossovers with "classic" instruments. Most of these events also feature Schnitzelbanks or other satiric elements.

Some of the so-called Vorfasnachtsveranstaltungen are:

- Mimösli at the Häbsetheater
- Offizielles Preistrommeln und -pfeifen (the official contest of drummers and flutists)
- Pfyfferli at the Theater Fauteuil
- Charivari in the Volkshaus
- Räppli-Serenade in the Rheinpark (cancelled since 2005)
- Stubete in the Restaurant Atlantis
- Kinder-Charivari in the Theater Basel
- Monstre-Trommelkonzert (aka Drummeli), formerly in the Messe Basel, as of 2011 at the Musical Theater Basel
- Fasnachtsbändeli (for children and families), Theater Arlecchino
- S Ridicule in the Helmut Förnbacher Theater Company at Badischer Bahnhof
- Zofingerconzärtli in the Congress Center Basel, the oldest pre-fasnacht event organized by the student society Zofingia Basel, since more than 125 years.

=== Lantern piping ===
The lantern piping (Ladärne yynepfyffe) takes place on the Sunday evening before Fasnacht. The lanterns, most of them still wrapped up from delivery from their respective workshops, are brought to where the parade begins in the city centre. Their arrival is accompanied by the pipers (still without costumes or masks), while the drummers leave their drums at home.

=== Lantern farewell ===
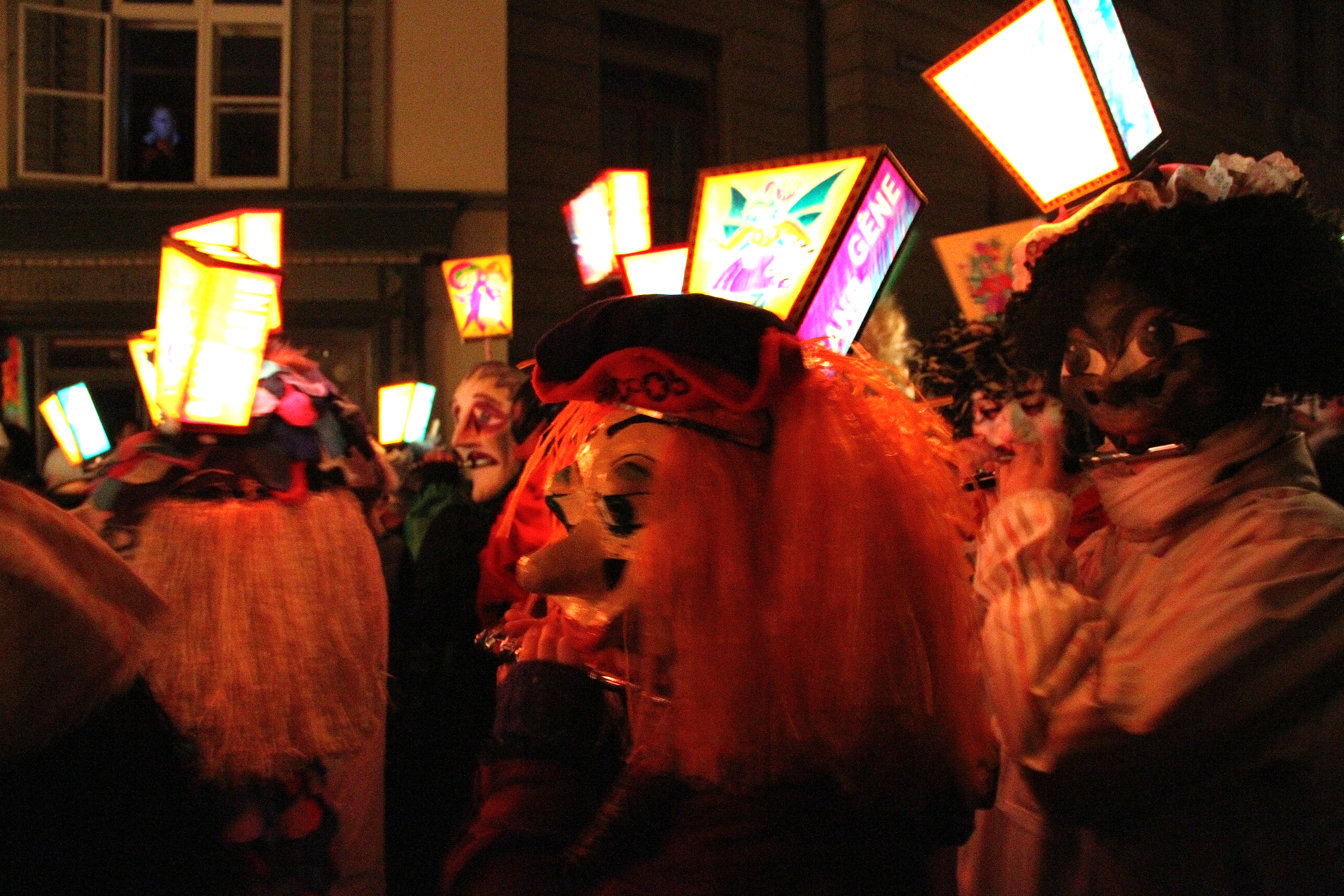
Basel Carnival (Switzerland) Morgestraich, February 18, 2013

The lantern farewell (Ladärne Verabschiide) is performed by the Cliques on the final evening of the Fasnacht, normally starting at 4:00 am on Thursday but sometimes earlier. Each Clique has a specific ritual for the farewell, most of which involve forming a circle with their lanterns and chanting a particular musical composition. Popular compositions are the Wettsteinmarsch, the Tagwacht, the Retraite, the Basler Marsch and "le Lancier". During this chanting, the lanterns are gradually extinguished.

=== Kehrausball ===
On the Saturday after Fasnacht, there are many masked balls, which are together known as the Kehrausball (or Kehruss in the local dialect). Many Cliques have their own masked balls in their clique-cellars.

=== Stroll Sundays ===
On any one of the three Sundays directly following the Fasnacht (known as the Bummelsonntage, or "stroll Sundays"), all Cliques and Guggenmusik groups participate in the final act of the Fasnacht. During their chosen day (1st, 2nd, or 3rd Bummelsonntag, depending on the group), the groups go on a small trip somewhere outside of Basel, usually including a visit to a restaurant. Later in the evening, the groups return to Basel in normal street clothes (no costumes or masks) and parade one last time through the inner city, particularly along the major street in the city, Freie Strasse.

== Organization ==
Since 1901, the organisation of Fasnacht has been arranged by the Fasnachts-Comité, which acts as the official contact for all questions and concerns about Fasnacht. The Comité also distributes Fasnacht badges (Blaggedde). These are sold in four versions and cost between 9 and 100 Swiss francs, and the proceeds go to the Fasnacht groups. It is requested, though not required, that visitors purchase a badge, so that the groups can continue to finance themselves. The saying goes: "He who doesn't have a badge harms the Fasnacht."

=== Fasnacht in numbers ===
In 2004, over 480 units were registered with the Fasnachts-Comité: 141 Cliques, organisations and groups, 141 floats and coaches, 61 Gugge music groups, 86 pipe and drums groups, and 55 individual masks and small groups. In total, there were more than 12,000 Fasnächtler who took part in organised groups. In addition, there were approximately 6,000 "wild" Fasnächtler (Schyssdräggzygli). A total of 185 parade lanterns were carried or pushed on mobile frames.

== History ==
Similar to many other carnival traditions, the Basel carnival has its roots in Celtic and Germanic customs, specifically in practices related to ancestor veneration, the expulsion of winter, and fertility rituals.

The specific history of the Basler Fasnacht remains unknown as all the documents related to the carnival were destroyed in the catastrophic earthquake of 1356. The earliest surviving document relating to the Basel Carnival traces back to the year 1376.

During the Reformation period, some celebrations were restricted, and at times even banned. In response, the Basel carnival gradually transformed into a form of resistance against authoritative repression. Additionally, the parade themes shifted towards political topics, adopting a distinctively satirical nature.

It remains unclear why Carnival starts one week later in Basel than elsewhere in Switzerland or Germany.

The common explanation is that after the Reformation in 1520, Basel continued celebrating its Fasnacht, while the other regions officially stopped. It is said, that in order to differ from the Catholic customs, Fasnacht was scheduled one week later starting in 1529. There are no documents from this era supporting this theory, and the resolutions from 1529 were not quoted until 200 years later.

Historians note that the Catholic carnival date was rescheduled six days earlier in 1091 in the Council of Benevent, because the Sundays were excluded from the 40-day fasting period before Easter, making Ash Wednesday the first day of Lent. From then until the 16th century, the two carnival dates existed. The first one, ending on Ash Wednesday, was known as the Herren- or Pfaffenfasnacht (lords' or priests' carnival) and was observed by those members of the higher echelons of society. The second, one week later at the old time, was known as the Bauernfasnacht (farmers' carnival). Afterwards, only this second carnival was celebrated in Basel.

Today, the Carnival of Basel is said to be the only case where the Catholic carnival survived in a post reformation protestant city in the world".

In 2017 the UNESCO added the Carnival of Basel to the list of Intangible Cultural Heritage.

=== Noteworthy events ===
In 2002, the Industrielle Werke Basel (IWB) turned the streetlights off too early, at 3:59 am. Nonetheless, Fasnacht went on until Thursday at 4:00 am. Therefore, the 2002 Fasnacht lasted one minute longer than usual.

During the night before Morgestraich 2006, about 50 cm of snow fell within only a couple of hours and blocked the inner city of Basel. It took great effort to free the city from the snow and enable the Fasnacht to take place. Never before has a Fasnacht been celebrated with more snow, and especially not fresh-fallen snow. This 50 cm of snow was the third-highest snow level ever recorded in Basel and the highest level of fresh-fallen snow within 24 hours for the city.

In 2020 and 2021, the carnival was cancelled due to the COVID-19 pandemic. In 2022 the carnival took place again in a limited form.

== See also ==
- Swabian–Alemannic Fastnacht
