= List of interments at Woodlawn Cemetery (Bronx) =

The following is a list of notable persons interred in Woodlawn Cemetery in the Bronx, New York City.

== A ==
- Charles H. Adams, politician
- Anthony Allaire
- Vivian Beaumont Allen
- Vincent Alo
- Princess Anastasia of Greece and Denmark buried with her parents in the family mausoleum.
- John Murray Anderson
- Alexander Archipenko
- Herman Ossian Armour
- James C. Auchincloss

== B ==
- Benjamin Babbitt
- Jules Bache
- James Anthony Bailey
- Jacob Baiz
- Joseph C. Baldwin
- Billy Bang
- Frances Elizabeth Barrow
- Diana Barrymore
- Nora Bayes
- Charles Becker
- Digby Bell
- Laura Joyce Bell
- Alva Belmont
- Oliver Belmont
- Irving Berlin, songwriter and musician
- Maximilian Berlitz
- Samuel Betts
- Amelia Bingham
- Ausburn Birdsall
- Elizabeth Bisland
- Cornelius Bliss
- Evangeline Wilbour Blashfield
- Nellie Bly
- Coralie Blythe
- George Boldt
- Robert W. Bonynge
- Emma Booth, involved with the Salvation Army
- Gail Borden
- Bostwick family
- Anne Lynch Botta
- William V. Brady, Mayor of New York City
- Josephine Brandell
- Boris Brasol
- Herbert Brenon
- George Frederick Bristow
- Benjamin Bristow
- Addison Brown
- Henry Bruckner, Bronx Borough President
- Charles Waldron Buckley
- Ralph Bunche, United Nations official and diplomat
- Richard Busteed
- Benjamin Franklin Butler (1795–1858), lawyer
- Charles Butler

== C ==
- Hervey C. Calkin
- Harry Carey
- Charles A. Carleton
- Diahann Carroll
- Vernon and Irene Castle, well-known husband and wife dancing team, movie stars
- Fermine Baird Catchings, genealogist
- Carrie Chapman Catt
- Alfred C. Chapin
- John Wilbur Chapman, Evangelist, Author, Hymn Writer
- Robert Chesebrough, Chemist, discovered petroleum jelly
- Joseph Hodges Choate, lawyer, diplomat
- Bobby Clark (comedian)
- Horace F. Clark
- Huguette Clark
- William A. Clark
- Henry Clews
- George M. Cohan – bronze statue in center of Times Square
- Ornette Coleman
- Barron Collier
- Samuel Colman, painter, interior designer, and writer
- Ida Conquest
- Austin Corbin
- Ricardo Cortez
- Lotta Crabtree
- Charles Nelson Crittenton
- William Nelson Cromwell
- Celia Cruz
- Countee Cullen
- Frederick Kingsbury Curtis

== D ==
- Leopold Damrosch
- Jess Dandy
- John H. Davis, American writer
- Miles Davis
- Clarence Day
- Zachariah Deas
- Cornelius H. DeLamater
- George W. De Long
- Rafael Díez de la Cortina y Olaeta, linguist
- Sidney Dillon
- E.L. Doctorow
- Charles Cleveland Dodge, Brigadier General (youngest), American Civil War
- William E. Dodge
- Richard Dorson
- Elsie Driggs, painter of Precisionism
- Paul Du Chaillu
- Hazel Nell Dukes, civil rights activist
- Vernon Duke
- Finley Peter Dunne
- William C. Durant

== E ==
- Gertrude Ederle, record-setting swimmer
- Gus Edwards, songwriter and vaudevillian
- Duke Ellington
- Albert Ellis

== F ==
- Benjamin L. Fairchild
- David Farragut
- Edoardo Ferrari-Fontana
- Bud Fisher
- Clara Fisher
- Rudolph Fisher
- Clyde Fitch
- Geraldine Fitzgerald
- James Montgomery Flagg
- Joe Foy, baseball player
- Ace Frehley, Kiss guitarist
- Frankie Frisch, baseball player
- Antoinette Perry Frueauff

== G ==
- Tommy Gagliano, Mobster
- Lindley Miller Garrison, US Secretary of War
- Francis Patrick Garvan, Director of Bureau of Investigations
- John Warne Gates, Gilded Age industrialist and gambler
- Charles Sidney Gilpin, stage actor
- Thomas F. Gilroy, Mayor of New York City
- Ambrosio José Gonzales, Cuban general
- Jay Gould, Gilded Age American railroad magnate and financier
- Jay Gould II, an American real tennis player and a grandson of Jay Gould
- Archibald Gracie
- Archibald Gracie III, Confederate General
- Archibald Gracie IV, Titanic survivor
- Charles K. Graham, Union General & Civil Engineer
- George Bird Grinnell, anthropologist, historian, naturalist, and writer.
- Lawrence Grossmith, English actor
- Simon Guggenheim, U.S. Senator, philanthropist

== H ==
- The Haffen family of Haffen Brewing Company are buried on 'brewers' row.'
- Oscar Hammerstein Sr.
- Lionel Hampton
- W. C. Handy
- Edward Harkness, philanthropist
- Lamon V. Harkness, businessman, stockholder in Standard Oil, yachtsman
- William L. Harkness
- Charles K. Harris
- Sue Harvard, opera singer
- William Frederick Havemeyer, businessman, Mayor of New York City
- William Haviland, actor
- Coleman Hawkins
- Millicent Hearst
- August Heckscher
- John Held Jr.
- Victor Herbert
- Adelaide Herrmann
- Alexander Herrmann
- Christian Archibald Herter
- John D. Hertz, businessman, thoroughbred racehorse owner and breeder
- Jim Holdsworth, baseball player
- Celeste Holm, actress
- Casper Holstein.
- Richard Hudnut
- Charles Evans Hughes, 11th Chief Justice of the United States
- Frederick P. Hummel
- Harold Hunter, skateboarder
- Arabella Huntington – cenotaph as she is buried in California
- Collis P. Huntington
- Barbara Hutton
- Henry Baldwin Hyde

== I ==
- Samuel Isham

== J ==
- Milt Jackson
- Illinois Jacquet
- Fanny Janauschek
- Buddy Johnson
- Bumpy Johnson
- Ella Johnson
- Hall Johnson
- Augustus D. Juilliard

== K ==
- Hermann Jakob Knapp
- Felix Knight
- Pedro Knight
- Fritz Kreisler

== L ==
- Fiorello La Guardia
- Scott La Rock
- Daniel S. Lamont
- Walter W. Law
- Canada Lee
- Henry Lehman
- Frank Leslie
- J. C. Leyendecker, illustrator
- Harold Lockwood
- Frank Belknap Long, horror author
- Mansfield Lovell, Confederate officer
- August Guido Lüchow, restaurateur
- George Platt Lynes

== M ==
- A. Kingsley Macomber, businessman, Thoroughbred racehorse owner and breeder
- Rowland Macy
- Frankie Manning, dancer, instructor, and choreographer
- Martha Mansfield
- Vito Marcantonio, politician
- Dewey Markham
- Alfred Erskine Marling
- Louis Marx, toy merchant
- Bat Masterson, lawman, writer
- Victor Maurel
- William McAdoo
- Josiah Calvin McCracken
- Alice Foote MacDougall, restaurateur
- Charles McCarron, vaudeville composer
- George A. McGuire
- Jackie McLean, musician
- George McManus, cartoonist
- Roi Cooper Megrue, playwright
- Marie Mattingly Meloney
- Herman Melville, author
- Dean Meminger
- Mario Merola (1922–1987), lawyer, New York City Councilman, and Bronx County District Attorney
- William P. Merrill
- Harry F. Millarde (1885–1931), silent film actor and director
- Cyrus Miller, lacrosse player
- Gilbert Miller
- Marilyn Miller
- Norma Miller
- Florence Mills
- John Purroy Mitchel, Mayor of New York City
- John Bassett Moore
- George L. K. Morris (1905–1975), Cubist artist, writer, and editor
- Paul Morton
- Robert Moses, government official, planner, builder, and Parks Department Commissioner of New York City
- Bernarr McFadden Founder of the Physical Culture Hotel in Dansville, NY, McFadden Publications

== N ==
- Thomas Nast, political cartoonist
- LeRoy Neiman, artist
- Harold Nicholas
- Ruth Rowland Nichols
- Hideyo Noguchi
- James W. Nye

== O ==
- Blanche Oelrichs
- Hermann Oelrichs
- William Butler Ogden
- Chauncey Olcott
- Joe "King" Oliver
- Dave Orr
- Marcus Otterbourg

== P ==
- Augustus G. Paine Jr.
- Felix Pappalardi
- Dorothy Parker (ashes reburied at Woodlawn in 2020)
- James Cash Penney
- Antoinette Perry, actress, director and co-founder of the American Theatre Wing
- Alex Pompez, African-American baseball executive
- Generoso Pope
- George B. Post
- Otto Preminger, film director
- Samuel I. Prime
- Frederick Freeman Proctor, vaudeville impresario
- Joseph Pulitzer, newspaper owner and founder of Pulitzer prize
- Big Pun
- Mihajlo Pupin, Serbian-American electrical engineer, physicist and inventor
- Hovsep Pushman (1877–1966), American artist of Armenian background

== R ==
- Charles Ranhofer
- Norman B. Ream
- Theodor Reik
- Gaetano Reina
- Lance Reventlow
- Leonard Kip Rhinelander
- Grantland Rice
- Vincent Richards
- Tex Rickard
- Max Roach
- Charles Francis Roe
- Katherine Bissell Roe
- Delmar "Barney" Roos
- Margaret Rudkin, Pepperidge Farm founder
- Dick Rudolph, major league baseball pitcher, one of 17 who was allowed to continue to throw the spitball after baseball made against the rules in 1920
- Damon Runyon

== S ==
- Alexander P. de Seversky, a Russian-American aviation pioneer and inventor
- Louis Sherry, restaurateur, caterer, confectioner and hotelier
- A. Ledyard Smith, archaeologist
- Ada "Bricktop" Smith, dancer, jazz singer, vaudevillian and saloon-keeper
- Ruth Brown Snyder, murderer
- Elizabeth Cady Stanton, early women's rights activist
- Joseph Stella, artist
- Josef Stránský, Czech conductor, composer, and art collector
- Ida Straus (cenotaph only; her body was not recovered after the Titanic sinking)
- Isidor Straus – owner of Macy's Department Store, Democratic member of the 53rd Congress of the United States, victim of the sinking of the RMS Titanic
- William Lafayette Strong, Mayor of New York City
- William Matheus Sullivan, prominent New York City lawyer and patron of music
- Karl Struss

== T ==
- Arthur Fitzwilliam Tait, artist
- Jōkichi Takamine
- Clarice Taylor
- Ben Teal, theater director
- Jerry Thomas, bartender
- Olive Thomas
- James Walter Thompson, businessman, advertiser
- Lloyd Tilghman, Confederate General
- Dan Topping
- Henry E. Tremain, Civil War Medal of Honor recipient, author, lawyer
- Ada Bampton Tremaine, philanthropist
- Cicely Tyson

== U ==
- Vladimir Ussachevsky
- Gladys Unger
- Irwin Untermyer
- Samuel Untermyer

== V ==
- Abraham Van Buren
- Robert Anderson Van Wyck, first Mayor of Greater New York City
- Virginia Fair Vanderbilt

== W ==
- Madam C. J. Walker
- Arthur Mellen Wellington
- William Collins Whitney
- Bert Williams
- Lottie Williams
- Ann Woodward
- Frank Winfield Woolworth
- James Hood Wright
- Cootie Williams jazz musician
