= Charles T. Mott =

American architect

Halliehurst

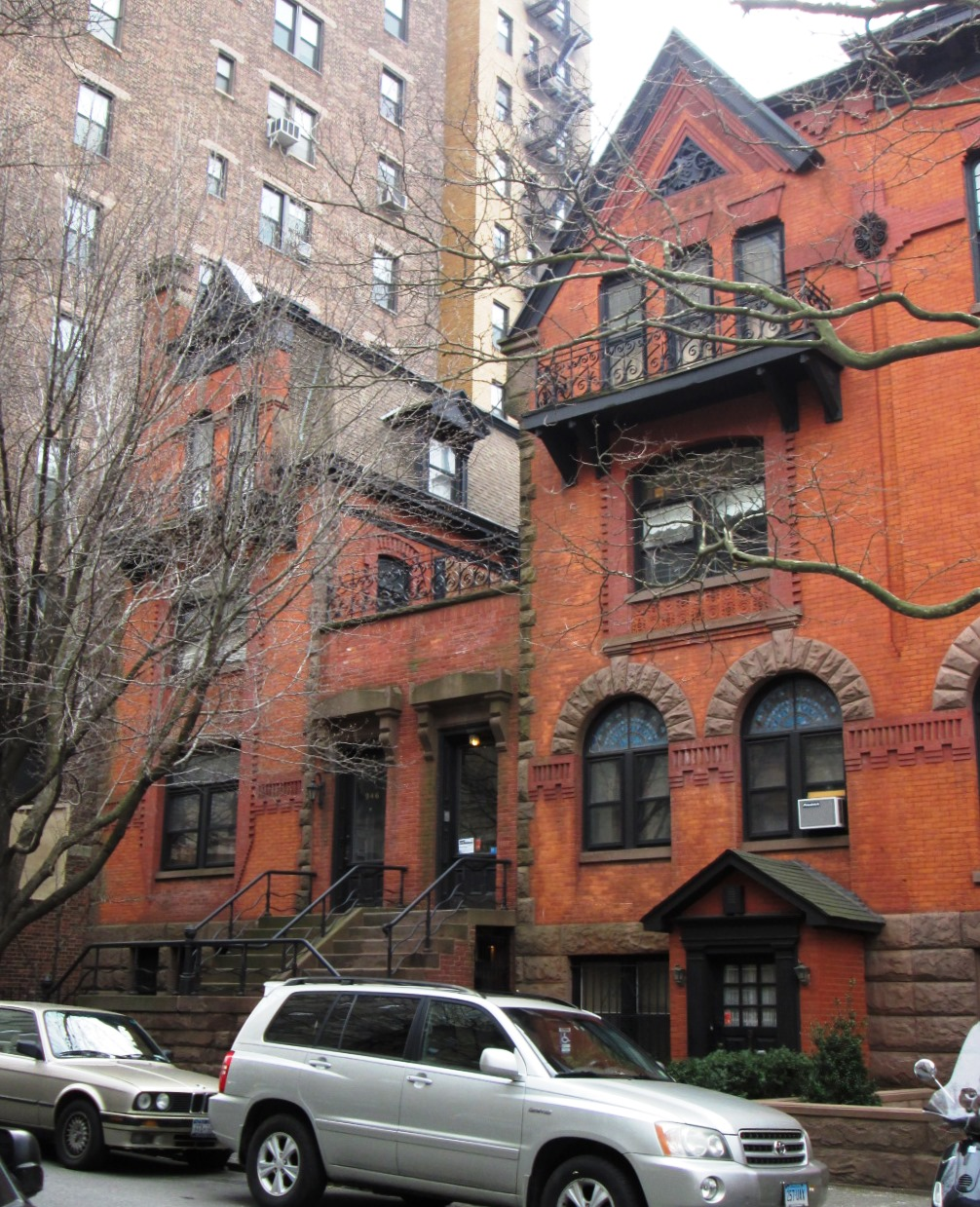
944-946 President Street in Park Slope, Brooklyn

Charles T. Mott was an architect in the U.S. He designed many rowhouses in Manhattan, New York City and Halliehurst (1890), for businessman and government official Stephen Benton Elkins who later became a U.S. Senator. Halliehurst is in what is now Elkins, West Virginia and is part of the Davis & Elkins College campus. He also designed an annex to the Seville Hotel building and many West Side Rowhouses in Manhattan, New York City. He was a fellow in the American Institute of Architects.

Halliehurst and the Davis & Elkins College campus are part of the Davis and Elkins Historic District, a National Historic Landmark.

Halliehurst was completed in 1890 for Elkins. It is a large and elaborate Queen Anne Victorian style building. The exterior is finished mainly in wooden clapboards and stone. Its interior is elaborate with a large main hall and dining room. Halliehurst was given by Hallie Elkins (the widow of Stephen Elkins) to the college, which has used it in a variety of ways.

Mott designed the Romanesque revival townhouses at 246 and 248 West 73rd Street in Manhattan. He also designed 940-946 President Street in Park Slope, Brooklyn. He also designed 325 West 76th Street for Edward Jones one of the founders of Dow Jones & Company and 337 West 76th Street (1900).

On the south side of 73rd Street between Broadway and West End Avenue he designed 19 rowhouses, mostly for developer William J. Merritt & Co. He also designed properties at 27, 29, and 31 West 95th Street and 318, 320, 322, 324, 326, 338, 330 and 332 West 77th Street as well as 308, 310, and 312 West 77th Street.

American Architect and Building News ran a feature on his house for Elkins on July 25, 1891.

Mott partnered with Hugo Kafka to form Kofka & Mott from 1893 to 1896.

Halliehurst is listed on the National Register of Historic Places.
