= Davis and Elkins Historic District =

Historic district in West Virginia, United States

- U.S. National Register of Historic Places
- U.S. National Historic Landmark District
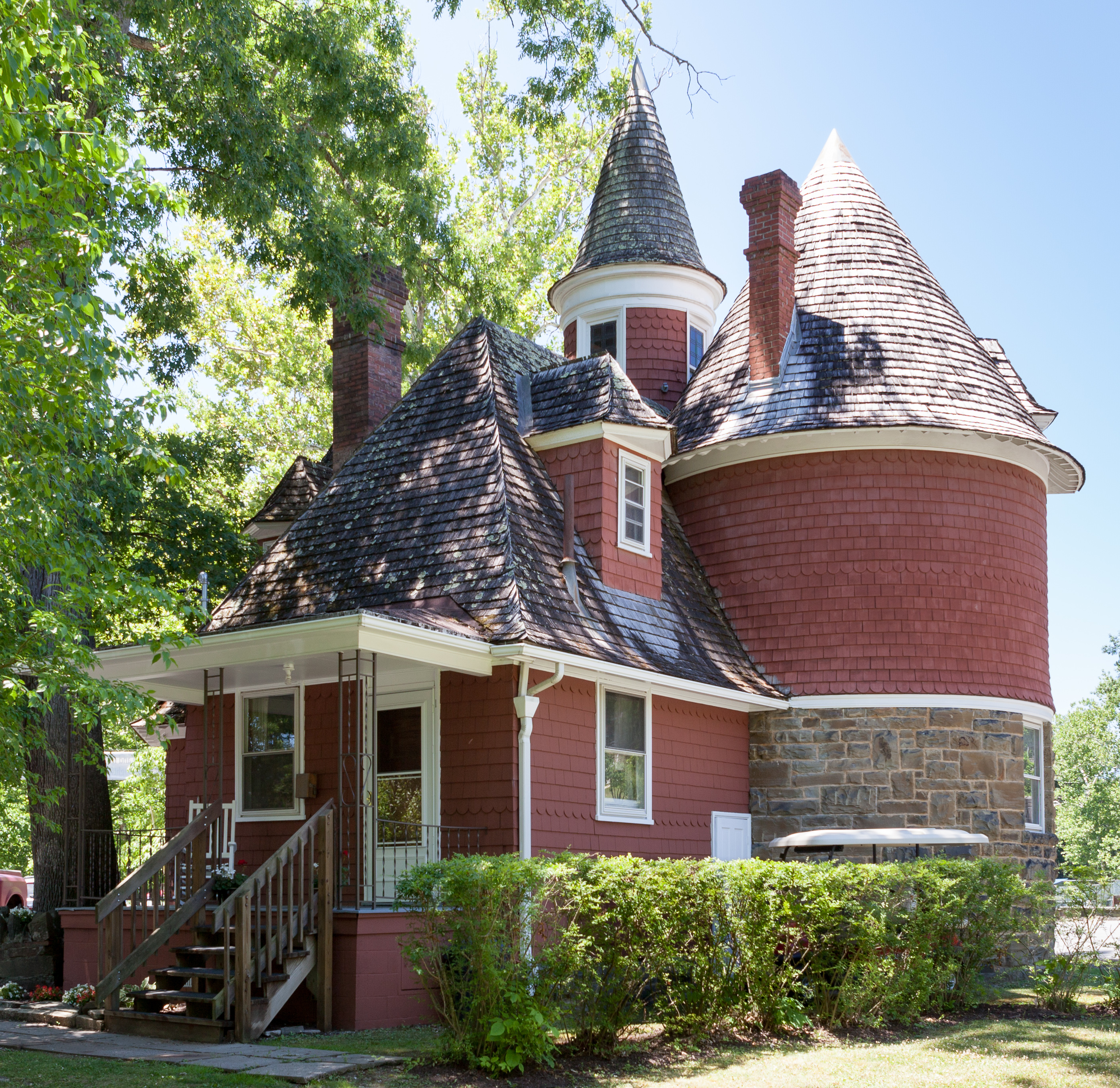
- The Gate House, part of the Historic District, in July 2014.

- Location within West Virginia Location within the United States
- Location: Elkins, West Virginia
- Coordinates: 38°55′51″N 79°50′50″W
- Area: 2 acres (0.81 ha)
- Built: 1890
- Architect: Charles T. Mott, Baldwin and Pennington
- Architectural style: Queen Anne
- NRHP reference No.: 96001129

Significant dates
- Added to NRHP: June 19, 1996
- Designated NHLD: June 7, 1998

The Davis and Elkins Historic District is a National Historic Landmark District on the campus of Davis & Elkins College in Elkins, West Virginia. It includes two mansions, the Senator Stephen Benton Elkins House (Halliehurst) and Graceland, that are separately listed on the National Register of Historic Places. A gate house and an ice house are also included in the district. These four structures are associated with the families of Henry Gassaway Davis (1823-1916) and Stephen Benton Elkins (1841-1911), who were dominating figures in the politics and economy of West Virginia in the late 19th century. It was declared a National Historic Landmark in 1998.

== Description and history ==
The Davis and Elkins Historic District is composed of four discontiguous sections of the Davis & Elkins College campus on the north side of Elkins. Each area contains a single structure, associated historically the life of either Henry Davis or Stephen Benton Elkins. Davis was a self-made businessman who made his fortune mainly in the railroad business, and then embarked on a series of highly successful coal ventures with Elkins, his son-in-law. Both Elkins and Davis served as United States Senators, and were significant figures in both state and national politics in the post-Civil War years of the 19th century.

=== Graceland ===
Graceland, completed in 1893 for Davis, is a large and sophisticated expression of Queen Anne Victorian architecture, designed by Baldwin and Pennington of Baltimore, Maryland. It is a mainly stone structure, with architectural variety typical of the Queen Anne, and a more Colonial Revival porch across the front. It was the centerpiece of a 360-acre (150 ha) estate, and is prominently sited on one of the highest points of the Davis & Elkins campus. It now serves as an inn and conference center for the college.

=== Halliehurst ===
Halliehurst, completed in 1890 for Elkins, was designed by Charles T. Mott of New York City. It is also a large and elaborate Queen Anne Victorian, its exterior finished mainly in wooden clapboards and stone. Its interior is particularly elaborate, with a large main hall and dining room. Halliehurst was given by Hallie Elkins (the widow of Stephen Elkins) to the college, which has used it in a variety of ways since.

=== Icehouse ===
The icehouse is a cylindrical stone structure, built for the Elkinses to house ice used for refrigeration. It has typically been used by the college as a coffeehouse and gathering place for students.

=== Gatehouse ===
The gatehouse is located at the northeast corner of Campus Drive and Sycamore Street. Built for the Elkinses at the same time as Halliehurst, it is stylistically similar to the main house, although on a smaller scale. It was the longtime home of the estate's groundskeepers, a role that continued into the college years.

== See also ==
- List of National Historic Landmarks in West Virginia
- National Register of Historic Places listings in Randolph County, West Virginia
