= Jan Eriksson =

Jan Eriksson may refer to:

- Jan Eriksson (footballer, born 1962)
- Jan Eriksson (footballer, born 1967)
- Jan Eriksson (ice hockey)

== See also ==
- Jan Ericson, Swedish politician
