= Mary Brooks Picken =

American author

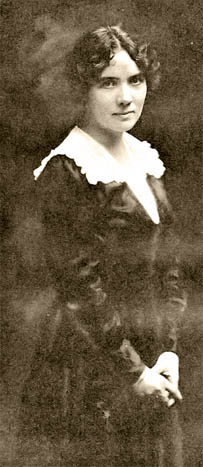
Mary Brooks Picken c. 1918, photo published in her book Secrets of Distinctive Dress

Mary Brooks Picken (August 6, 1886, Arcadia, KS – March 8, 1981, Williamsport, PA) was an American author of 96 books on needlework, sewing, and textile arts. Her Fashion Dictionary was published by Funk and Wagnalls in 1957.

== Career ==
She founded the Woman's Institute of Domestic Arts and Sciences in Scranton, Pennsylvania. An expert on fashion, Picken was an authority on dress, fabric, design, and sewing. She taught "Economics of Fashion" at Columbia University and was one of the five founding directors of the Metropolitan Museum of Art's Costume Institute. She was the first woman to be named a trustee of the State University of New York's Fashion Institute of Technology, by Thomas E. Dewey, the Governor of New York, in 1951.

When vice-president of the G. Lynn Sumner advertising agency she designed the course material for the Richard Hudnut Du Barry Success Course.

She was a member of the National Academy of Sciences National Research Council's Advisory Committee on Women's Clothing, which selected Hattie Carnegie as the designer of the United States Army's women's uniform and provided advice and assistance on all elements of the U.S. Army's women's uniform beginning in 1949. Picken was one of the founders of the Fashion Group, now the Fashion Group International, a nonprofit professional association. She also served as chairman of its board.

== Personal life ==
She was married to G. Lynn Sumner, president of the advertising firm of G. Lynn Sumner Co. of New York. Picken died on March 8, 1981, at a nursing home in Williamsport, Pennsylvania.

== Published works ==
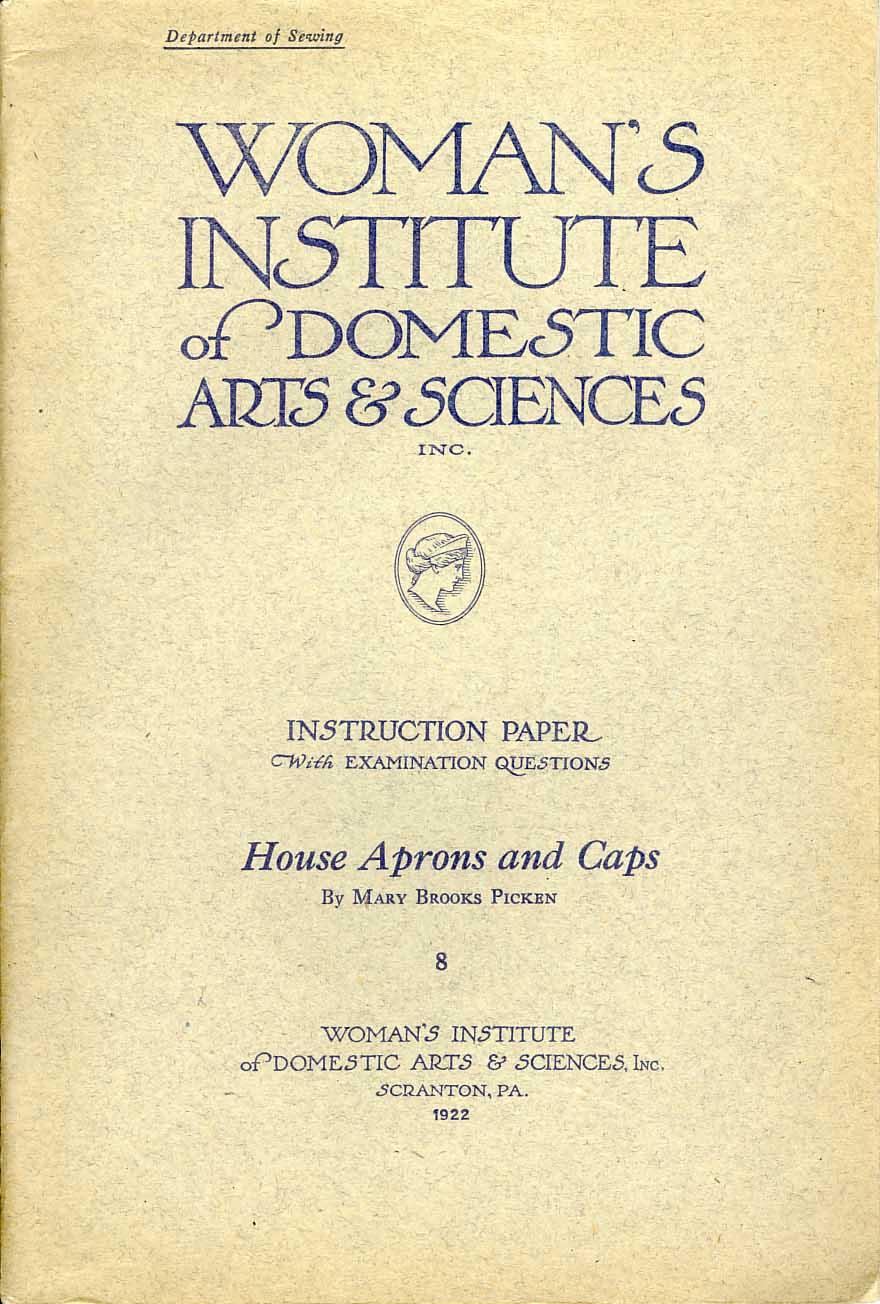
Cover of one of Picken's books.

1915

- Corsets And Close-fitting Patterns - No. 4
- Drafting and plain dressmaking - 3 A-2
- Fancy aprons and sunbonnets
- Millinery Stitches, Department of Millinery, Instruction Paper with Examination Questions
- Skeleton Foundations, Parts 1 & 2, No. 102 A & B, Department of Millinery, Instruction Paper with Examination Questions
- Solid Foundations, Parts 1 & 2, No. 103 A & B, Department of Millinery, Instruction Paper with Examination Questions
- Braid Hats, No. 104, Department of Millinery, Instruction Paper with Examination Questions
- Piece-Goods Hats, No. 105, Department of Millinery, Instruction Paper with Examination Questions
- Essential Stitches and Seams, Part 1, No. 1 A-3, Department of Sewing, Instruction Paper with Examination Questions
- Pattern Drafting, No. 2-3, Department of Sewing, Instruction Paper with Examination Questions
- Tight Linings and Boning, No. 5-2
- Essential Stitches and Seams, Part 2, No. 1 B

1916

- Millinery Facings
- A Glossary of Millinery Terms, Department of Millinery
- Developing Hats of Braid, Department of Millinery
- Fancy and Draped Crowns, Department of Millinery, Instruction Paper with Examination Questions
- Tailored Buttonholes and Buttons, Instruction Paper with Examination Questions
- Woolen Materials and Tailored Plackets No. 12, Department of Sewing (First Ed); Department of Tailoring, (1922 Ed), Instruction Paper with Examination Questions
- Harmony of Dress, 11-2, Department of Sewing, Instruction Paper with Examination Questions
- Fancy aprons and sunbonnets
- Underwear and lingerie 10 B; Department of Sewing, later published as Plain Undergarments, No. 202
- Tailored Skirts, Woman's Institute of Domestic Arts & Sciences, Instruction Paper with Examination Questions
- Embroidery Stitches Parts 1 and 2, No. 7-A & 7-B, Department of Sewing, Woman’s Institute of Domestic Arts & Sciences Inc., Instruction Paper with Examination Questions
- Remodeling and Renovating, No. 17, Department of Dressmaking, Instruction Paper with Examination Questions

1917

- Maternity and Infants' Garments - No. 19-2
- Miscellaneous garments 22

1918

- The Secrets of Distinctive Dress

1919

- Millinery Made Easy, 70WI, Department of Millinery, advertising pamphlet for course in millinery, reprinted in 1921, 1922, 1923, & 1924

1920

- Drafting And Plain Dressmaking - Part 2 - No. 3 B-2
- Patterns For Children And Misses' Garments - No. 18
- Pattern Drafting - No. 2-3
- Tight Linings And Bonings - No. 5-2
- Laces, Silks, And Linen - No. 6
- The Dressmaker And Tailor Shop - No. 25-2

1920

- Underwear And Lingerie
- Harmony of Dress - No. 11-2
- Corsets and Close Fitting Patterns
- Tailored Skirts - No. 13
- Woman's Institute Fashion Service; Instruction Quarterly included "Smart Designs ... With Detailed Instructions for Making"; Woman's Institute Magazine published monthly at least through Spring of 1930

1922

- Tailored Pockets, Woman's Institute of Domestic Arts & Sciences
- Tight Linings and Boning, Woman's Institute of Domestic Arts & Sciences
- House Aprons and Caps, No. 405, Woman's Institute of Domestic Arts & Sciences, Instruction Paper with Examination Questions

1923

- Woolen Materials and Tailored Plackets, Woman's Institute of Domestic Arts & Sciences, Instruction Paper with Examination Questions
- Individualizing Tissue-Paper Patterns, No. 403, Instruction Paper with Examination Questions
- Tailored Seams and Plackets, No. 414, Instruction Paper with Examination Questions
- Textiles and Sewing Materials, Women's Institute of Domestic Arts & Sciences

1925

- The Mary Brooks Picken Method Of Modern Dressmaking
- Underwear and Lingerie, Part 1, No 407-A, Instruction Paper with Examination Questions
- Designing and Planning Clothes, No. 415, Instruction Paper with Examination Questions

1927

- How to Make Dresses the Modern Singer Way (Singer Sewing Library No. 2) (reissued 1928, 1929, 1930)

1929

- How to make draperies, slip covers, cushions and other home furnishings the modern Singer way (Singer Sewing Library)

1930

- Sewing Secrets, Modern Methods of Stitching, Decorating and Finishing, The Spool Cotton Company (reissued 1934)

1931

- Laundering and Dry Cleaning, Woman's Institute of Domestic Arts & Sciences

1933

- Principles of Tailoring, Woman's Institute of Domestic Arts & Sciences

1939

- The language of fashion: Dictionary and digest of fabric, sewing and dress, Mary Brooks Picken school, Incorporated

1941

- Sewing For the Home, New York and London, Harper & Brothers

1943

- Mending Made Easy, The ABC and XYZ of Fabric Conservation, Harper & Brothers

1949

- Singer Sewing Book, New York, Singer Sewing Machine Co.

1955

- Sewing Magic
- Needlepoint Made Easy

1956

- Dressmakers of France: The who, how, and why of the French couture, Harper, 1956.

1957

- The Fashion Dictionary, Funk and Wagnalls, 1957. (1973 edition ISBN 0-308-10052-2, 1999 Dover republication ISBN 0-486-40294-0)

1993

- Old-Fashioned Ribbon Trimmings and Flowers. ISBN 978-0486-27521-5

1999

- A Dictionary of Costume and Fashion: Historic and Modern (unabridged Dover Books republication of The Fashion Dictionary, 1957). ISBN 978-0486-40294-9
