= Stephen B. Elkins =

American politician (1841–1911)

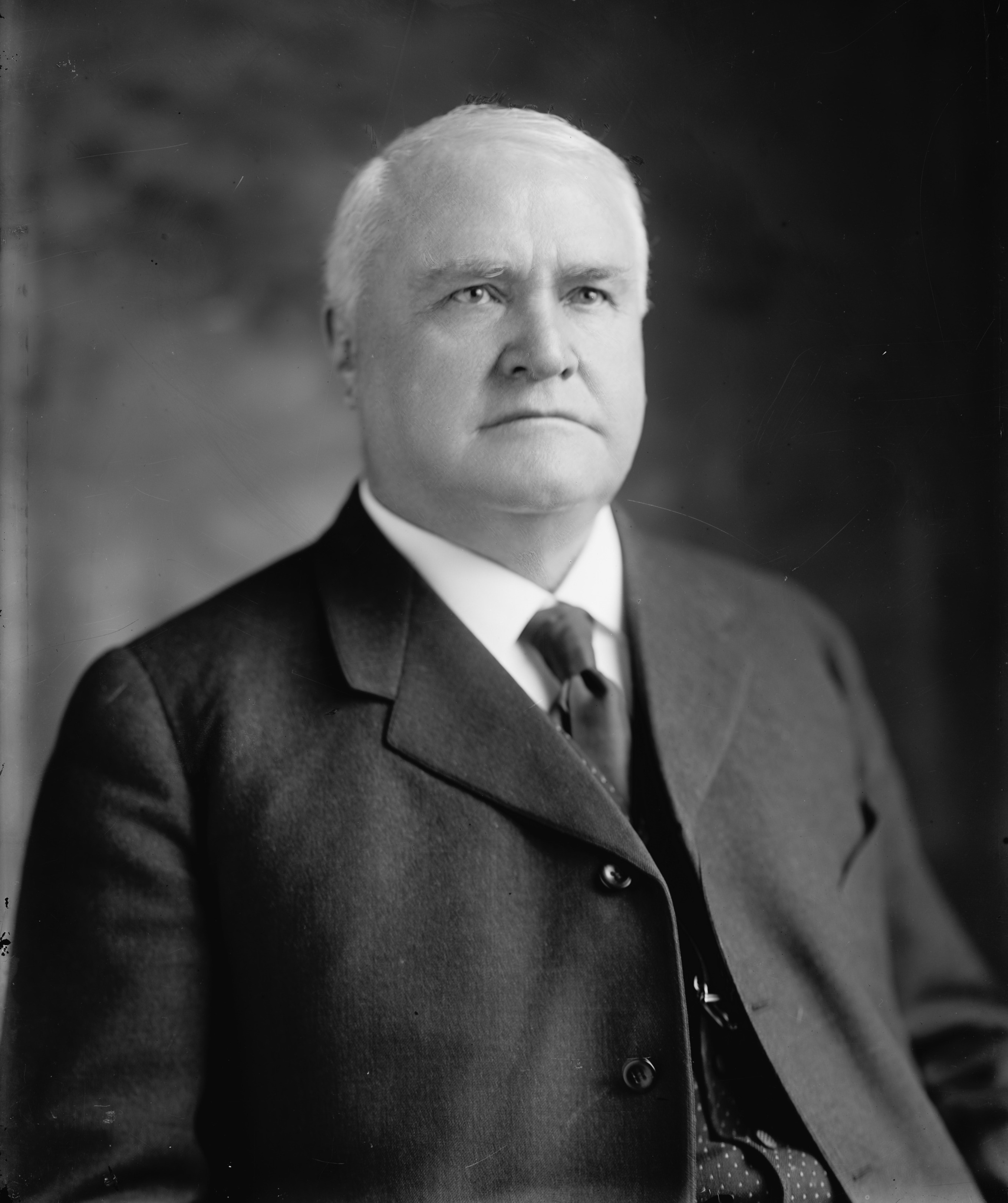
- Elkins, 1905–1911

United States Senator from West Virginia
- In office March 4, 1895 – January 4, 1911
- Preceded by: Johnson N. Camden
- Succeeded by: Davis Elkins

38th United States Secretary of War
- In office December 17, 1891 – March 5, 1893
- President: Benjamin Harrison
- Preceded by: Redfield Proctor
- Succeeded by: Daniel S. Lamont

Member of the U.S. House of Representatives from New Mexico's at-large district
- In office March 4, 1873 – March 3, 1877; Delegate
- Preceded by: José Manuel Gallegos
- Succeeded by: Trinidad Romero

Personal details
- Born: Stephen Benton Elkins; September 26, 1841 New Lexington, Ohio, US
- Died: January 4, 1911 (aged 69) Washington, D.C., US
- Party: Republican
- Spouse(s): Sarah Jacobs; Hallie Davis
- Education: Masonic College; University of Missouri, Columbia (BA)

Military service
- Allegiance: United States • Union
- Branch/service: United States Army • Union Army
- Rank: Captain
- Battles/wars: American Civil War

Stephen Benton Elkins (September 26, 1841 – January 4, 1911) was an American industrialist and politician. He served as the secretary of war between 1891 and 1893. He served in the United States Congress as a delegate from the Territory of New Mexico and a senator from West Virginia.

== Biography ==
=== Early life ===
Stephen Benton Elkins was born on September 26, 1841, near New Lexington, Ohio and moved with his family to Westport, Missouri (now part of Kansas City) in the mid-1840s. His parents were Philip Duncan Elkins and Sarah Pickett Withers. He attended the Masonic College in Lexington, Missouri in the 1850s, and graduated from the University of Missouri in Columbia in 1860. After graduation, he briefly taught school in Cass County, Missouri. Among his pupils was future James-Younger Gang member Cole Younger. Elkins studied law and was admitted to the Missouri state bar in 1864, the same year he moved to New Mexico Territory. Upon his arrival, he began to learn Spanish so he could represent those living in the area.

=== Civil War ===
In the American Civil War Elkins' father and brother joined the Confederate Army under Sterling Price, but he joined the Union Army. Before he joined the Union Army he was to encounter Quantrill's Raiders twice and was spared from being killed because of his father and brother. He noted:

They marched me along and we got to Quantrill's camp. There I saw Cole Younger, Dick Yager and George M. Todd, and several others afterward known for desperate deeds. Those I have mentioned were farmers' sons around where I lived. They identified me and said: Here comes Steve Elkins. All the way along I had been afraid that those fellows who had captured me would shoot me in the back, for I had on the watch which I am carrying now in the office of the secretary of war.

Elkins entered the Union Army as a captain of militia in the 77th Missouri Infantry. He served under Kersey Coates and only saw action once in the Battle of Lone Jack, which he said filled him with disgust for war. Elkins noted that his good fortune of being protected by Quantrill matched a fear of being butchered by Quantrill for becoming a Union soldier as Quantrill's Raiders were thought to be present at the battle.

Foster thought the Confederates were the guerrilla hands who raised the black flag, and never gave any quarter. So he refused to surrender, and every one of his officers was picked off. The guerrillas were victorious. I went over the battlefield afterward, the blood, the cries for water and death, the naked bodies stripped of their clothing, the dead horses which served for ramparts, gave me a disgust for war, which makes it seem strange that I am here at the head of the war department of this great government.

Elkins and Foster from the Lone Jack Battle were to argue for a pardon for Younger following his conviction in the Northfield, Minnesota bank robbery (Younger had rescued Foster from execution by Quantrill's Raiders in the battle).

=== New Mexico ===
Elkins entered the practice of law at Mesilla, New Mexico, and was elected to the territorial legislature in 1864 and 1865. He was appointed territorial district attorney for a term from 1866 to 1867. It was at this time, on June 10, 1866, that he married his first wife Sarah Simms Jacobs.

In 1867, Elkins served as attorney general of the territory and later as U.S. district attorney from 1867 to 1870. He was elected territorial delegate to the U.S. Congress in 1872, and reelected in 1874, serving from March 4, 1873, to March 4, 1877. In 1875, he met and married his second wife, Hallie Davis, and continued to practice law. He founded and was president of the Santa Fe National Bank, and pursued broad business interests in land, rail, mining, and finance including president of the massive Maxwell Land Grant Company. It is widely believed that the boundaries of the land grant were expanded by Maxwell through fraud. In attempting to evict "squatters" (legitimate land grant heirs) from the Land Grant he would be accused of being part of the Santa Fe Ring. Along with his brother in law, Thomas B. Catron, Elkins participated in what would become the largest land speculation conspiracy in U.S. history. Using his influence on politicians such as congressmen, territorial judges, and U.S. Surveyors General, Elkins was able to patent Spanish and Mexican land grants in his name, thereby illegally including himself as a legitimate heir to the grants. By collectively representing opposing parties in land disputes, Elkins and Catron effectively manipulated territorial government policy to illegally partition Spanish and Mexican land grants, a direct violation of the Treaty of Guadalupe Hidalgo.

=== West Virginia ===
Elkins married Hallie Davis, daughter of Senator Henry G. Davis of West Virginia, in 1875. He became a citizen of West Virginia in 1878 and began developing oil, coal, and timber industries with his father-in-law. They partnered to form the Davis Coal and Coke Company.

Stephen and Hallie built their home, Halliehurst, in Randolph County, and the town of Elkins was established nearby. New York architect Charles T. Mott designed the house. It was given by his widow along with surrounding property to Davis and Elkins College and is now part of the college's campus. It is individually listed on the National Register of Historic Places and also is a contributing property in the Davis and Elkins Historic District.

=== Secretary of War ===
Elkins served as Secretary of War in the Benjamin Harrison administration from December 17, 1891, to March 5, 1893. He was appointed owing to close friendship with Secretary of State James G. Blaine. Amongst his goals were that the rank of lieutenant general be revived, and also that noncommissioned officers receive higher pay to improve the quality of the service. He also broadened the intelligence functions of the Division of Military Information.

=== U.S. Senator ===
After his service as Secretary, Elkins was elected to the U.S. Senate in 1895, serving the state of West Virginia, and was re-elected twice. In the Senate, he held the positions of chairman of the Committee on the Geological Survey (Fifty-sixth and Fifty-ninth Congresses), and of member of the Committee on Interstate Commerce (Fifty-seventh through Sixty-first Congresses). Elkins served as Senator until his death in Washington, D.C. in 1911, and is interred in Maplewood Cemetery of Elkins, West Virginia.

== Legacy ==
Stephen Benton Elkins is the namesake of Elkins, West Virginia.

== See also ==
- Davis & Elkins College, in Elkins, WV; named for Senators Elkins and Davis
- Halliehurst or Senator Stephen Benton Elkins House
- List of members of the United States Congress who died in office (1900–1949)

U.S. House of Representatives
| Preceded by José Manuel Gallegos | Delegate to the U.S. House of Representatives from New Mexico's at-large congressional district 1873–1877 | Succeeded by Trinidad Romero |
Political offices
| Preceded by Redfield Proctor | United States Secretary of War; 1891–1893 | Succeeded by Daniel S. Lamont |
U.S. Senate
| Preceded by Johnson N. Camden | U.S. Senator (Class 1) from West Virginia; 1895–1911; Served alongside: Charles James Faulkner, Nathan B. Scott | Succeeded by Davis Elkins |
| Preceded by Shelby Cullom | Chair of the Senate Interstate Commerce Committee; 1901–1911 | Succeeded by Moses E. Clapp |
