= Sullivan Foundation =

American nonprofit organisation

The Sullivan Foundation is a non-profit organization dedicated to finding, developing, and furthering the careers of promising opera singers within the United States. Founded through the bequest of a prominent lawyer, William Matheus Sullivan (1885-1947), the foundation has awarded grants to close to 500 singers. Awards are given on the basis of an annual audition hosted by the foundation. The first director of the foundation was Edward Johnson, general manager of the Metropolitan Opera.

Past recipients of the Sullivan Award include such noted singers as Christine Brewer, Jessye Norman, Jerry Hadley, Kathleen Battle, Michael Devlin, Renée Fleming, Leona Mitchell, Susan Graham, Patricia Racette, Hanan Alattar, and Elizabeth Futral.

== Sullivan Award recipients ==
=== 2010s ===
- Alexandra Batsios, soprano (2015)
- Tracy Cox, soprano (2015)
- Jasmine Muhammad, soprano (2015, Gail Robinson Award)
- Simone Osborne, soprano (2015, Rose Bampton Award)
- Ariada Wehr, soprano (2015)
- Megan Marino, mezzo-soprano (2015)
- Deborah Nansteel, mezzo-soprano (2015, Betty Allen Award)
- Kevin Ray, tenor (2015)
- Brian Vu, tenor (2015)
- Shea Owens, baritone (2015)
- Sean Michael Plumb, baritone (2015, Theodor Uppman Award)
- Reginald Smith, Jr., baritone (2015)
- Kihun Yoon, baritone (2015)
- Alisa Jordheim, soprano (2016, Rose Bampton Award)
- Claudia Rosenthal, soprano (2016, Gail Robinson Award)
- Samantha Gossard, mezzo-soprano (2016)
- Alyssa Martin, mezzo-soprano (2016)
- Siman Chung, countertenor (2016)
- Miles Mykkanen, tenor (2016)
- Jack Swanson, tenor (2016)
- Kang Wang, tenor (2016)
- Alex DeSocio, baritone (2016)
- Ben Edquist, baritone (2016)
- Joseph Lattanzi, baritone (2016)
- Robert Mellon, baritone (2016)
- Alan Higgs, bass-baritone (2016)
- Davóne Tines, bass-baritone (2016, Betty Allen Award)
- Christian Zaremba, bass (2016)
- Michelle Bradley, soprano (2017, Betty Allen Award)
- Monica Dewey, soprano (2017)
- Pureum Jo, soprano (2017, Gail Robinson Award)
- Felicia Moore, soprano (2017)
- Laura Wilde, soprano (2017, Rose Bampton Award)
- Kristen Choi, mezzo-soprano (2017)
- Abigail Levis, mezzo-soprano (2017)
- Derrek Stark, tenor (2017)
- David Walton, tenor (2017)
- Christian Pursell, baritone (2017, Theodor Uppman Award)
- Leah Hawkins, soprano (2018, Betty Allen Award)
- erica Petrocelli, soprano (2018, Rose Bampton Award)
- Bille Bruley, tenor (2018)
- Mario Rojas, tenor (2018, Gail Robinson Award)
- Charles Sy, tenor (2018)
- Michael Adams, baritone (2018)
- Anthony Robin Schneider, bass (2018)
- Elizabeth Polese, soprano (2019, Gail Robinson Award)
- Katherine DeYoung, mezzo-soprano (2019, Betty Allen Award)
- Aryeh Nussbaum Cohen, countertenor (2019, David Lloyd Award)
- Kidon Choi, baritone (2019, Rose Bampton Award)
- Jarrett Porter, baritone (2019, Theo Uppman Award)

=== 2020s ===
- Katerina Burton, soprano (2021, Rose Bampton Award)
- Chelsea Lehnea, soprano (2021, Gail Robinson Award)
- Alice Chung, mezzo-soprano (2021)
- Key'mon W. Murrah, countertenor (2021, Betty Allen Award)
- Errin Duane Brooks, tenor (2021, David Lloyd Award)
- Nicholas Newton, bass-baritone (2021, Theodor Uppman Award)
- Adia Evans, soprano (2022)
- Elena Villalón, soprano (2022, Gail Robinson Award)
- Meredith Wohlgemuth, soprano (2022, Rose Bampton Award)
- Cody Bowers, countertenor (2022, David Lloyd Award)
- Matthew Cossack, baritone (2022)
- Navasard Hakobyan, baritone (2022, Theodor Uppman Award)
- Brian Major, baritone (2022, Betty Allen Award)
- Amber R. Monroe, soprano (2023, Betty Allen Award)
- Murrella Parton, soprano (2023, Gail Robinson Award)
- Teresa Perrotta, soprano
- Michelle Mariposa, mezzo-soprano (2023)
- Meridian Prall, mezzo-soprano (2023)
- Moisés Salazar, tenor (2023, David Lloyd Award)
- Le Bu, bass-baritone (2023, Theodor Uppman Award)
- Meryl Dominguez, soprano (2024)
- Brittany Olivia Logan, soprano (2024)
- Lauren Margison, soprano (2024)
- Aubrey Odle, mezzo-soprano (2024)
- Chuanyuan Liu, countertenor (2024)
- Daniel O'Hearn, tenor (2024)
- Joseph Parrish, bass-baritone (2024)
- Christian Simmons, bass-baritone (2024)

== Career Development Grants ==
=== 2010s ===
- Alisa Jordheim, soprano (2015)
- Felicia Moore, soprano (2015)
- Aleksandra Romano, mezzo-soprano (2015)
- Daniel Bates, tenor (2015)
- Ian McEuen, tenor (2015)
- Hunter Enoch, baritone (2015)
- Matthew Scollin, bass (2015)
- Leah Hawkins, soprano (2016)
- Raquel González, soprano (2016)
- Jacqueline Piccolino, soprano (2016)
- Lauren Eberwein, mezzo-soprano (2016)
- Eric Ferring, tenor (2017)
- Jorge Espino, baritone (2017)
- Theo Hoffman, baritone (2017)
- Steven LaBrie, baritone (2017)
- Anthony Robin Schneider, bass (2017)
- Meryl Dominguez, soprano (2018)
- Daniel Moody, countertenor (2018)
- Geoffrey Agpalo, tenor (2018)
- Alexander McKissick, tenor (2018)
- Carlos Enrique Santelli, tenor (2018)
- Timothy Bruno, bass (2018)
- Simona Genga, mezzo-soprano (2019)
- Richard Trey Smagur, tenor (2019)
- Christopher Kenney, baritone (2019)
- William Meinert, bass (2019)

=== 2020s ===
- Erika Baikoff, soprano (2021)
- Marlen Nahhas, soprano (2021)
- Seokjong Baek, tenor (2021)
- Terrence Chin-Loy, tenor (2021)
- Aaron Crouch, tenor (2021)
- Anthony León, tenor (2021)
- Timothy Murray, baritone (2021)
- Christian Simmons, bass-baritone (2021)
- Raven McMillon, soprano (2022)
- Sun-Ly Pierce, mezzo-soprano (2022)
- Meridian Prall, mezzo-soprano (2022)
- Luke Sutliff, baritone (2022)
- Duke Kim, tenor (2022, John Mariatry Award)
- Vladyslav Buialskyi, bass-baritone (2022)
- Mary Evelyn Hangley, soprano (2023)
- Kathleen O'Mara, soprano (2023)
- Kyle Tingzon, countertenor (2023)
- Lawrence Barasa, tenor (2023)
- Thomas Cilluffo, tenor (2023)
- Sankara Harouna, baritone (2023)
- Gabrielle Beteag, mezzo-soprano (2024)
- Kaswanna Kanyinda, mezzo-soprano (2024)
- Yonathan Astatke, baritone (2024)
- Eleomar Cuello, baritone (2024)
- Ben Reisinger, tenor (2024)
- John Mburu, bass (2024)
