= Hanan Alattar =

American operatic soprano

- Born: September 24, 1975 (age 51); Houston, Texas, U.S.
- Occupation: Singer
- Website: hananalattar.com

Hanan Alattar (born September 24, 1975) is an American operatic soprano who has had an active international career in concerts and in operas since the early 2000s. She has performed with many leading opera companies and orchestras in the United States and Europe, collaborating with such notable conductors as Plácido Domingo, James Conlon and Miguel Harth-Bedoya.

== Early life and education ==
Alattar was born in Houston, Texas. She first became interested in opera while a student at Saint Agnes Academy in her native city. She studied vocal performance at the University of Texas at Austin and with Marlena Malas and Diane Richardson at the Juilliard School in New York City. While at Juilliard she portrayed roles in several productions, including Tatyana in Eugene Onegin, Lady Billows in Britten's Albert Herring, and the title role in Igor Stravinsky's The Nightingale (2004). In The New York Times review of the latter performance, Allan Kozinn wrote that "[Alattar] sang the Nightingale's music with beauty, suppleness and the right measure of flighty virtuosity."

Alattar was the New Horizon Scholar at the Aspen Music Festival from 2000 to 2002, and was notably the winner of the Aspen Concerto Competition in 2002. While at Aspen she performed the roles of Blanche in Edward Berkeley's production of Poulenc's Les dialogues des Carmélites under the baton of James Conlon, sang Giorgetta in Puccini's Il tabarro with conductor Julius Rudel, and performed the title role in Donizetti's Lucia di Lammermoor. In 2002–2003 she was a member of the Young Artist Program at the Opera Theatre of Saint Louis. She was a finalist in Houston Grand Opera's Eleanor McCollum Competition and in 2004 received the Sullivan Foundation Award.

== Career ==
Alattar made her professional opera debut in 2004 with the Opera Theatre of Saint Louis (OTSL) as Sacagawea in the world premiere of Stephen Mager's Dream of the Pacific. Later that year she made her debut with the New York City Opera (NYCO) as the First Maid in Richard Strauss' Daphne. She has since returned to the NYCO as The Water in Rachel Portman's The Little Prince (2005) and as Zerlina in Mozart's Don Giovanni (2006).

In 2005 Alattar made her debut with the Gotham Chamber Opera (GCO) in New York City as Alceste in Handel's Arianna in Creta. That same year she performed the role of the Beggar Woman in Stephen Sondheim's Sweeney Todd with the Wolf Trap Opera Company and Bubikopf in Viktor Ullmann's Der Kaiser von Atlantis with the Chicago Symphony Orchestra at the Ravinia Festival. In 2006 she made her debut with the Los Angeles Opera as Amore in L'incoronazione di Poppea and returned to the LAO later that year to create the role of Dragonette in the world premiere of Elliot Goldenthal’s Grendel and portray the Celestial Voice in Don Carlo. In 2007 she portrayed Ghita in Alexander von Zemlinsky's Der Zwerg with the American Symphony Orchestra at the Bard Music Festival.

In 2008 Alattar returned to the Ravinia Festival in Chicago to portray Konstanze in Mozart's Die Entführung aus dem Serail and made her debut with Palm Beach Opera as Gilda in Verdi's Rigoletto. In 2009 she returned to the OTSL to portray Rosina in John Corigliano’s The Ghosts of Versailles and made her debut with the Boston Lyric Opera as Micaëla in Carmen. In 2010 she performed the role of Clarice in the GCO's production of Haydn's Il mondo della luna at the Hayden Planetarium in New York City. In 2011 she made her debut with the Seattle Opera as Pamina in The Magic Flute.

In 2007 Alattar made her European debut as Pousette in Massenet's Manon at the Berlin State Opera under conductor Daniel Barenboim. In 2009 she made her UK debut as Musetta in Jonathan Miller's production of La bohème at the English National Opera. She returned to the ENO in 2010 to play the lead role, Leila, in Georges Bizet's early opera The Pearl Fishers, in an updated production directed by British film-maker Penny Woolcock.
