= Senator Stephen Benton Elkins House =

Historic house in West Virginia, United States

- U.S. National Register of Historic Places
- U.S. National Historic Landmark District – Contributing property
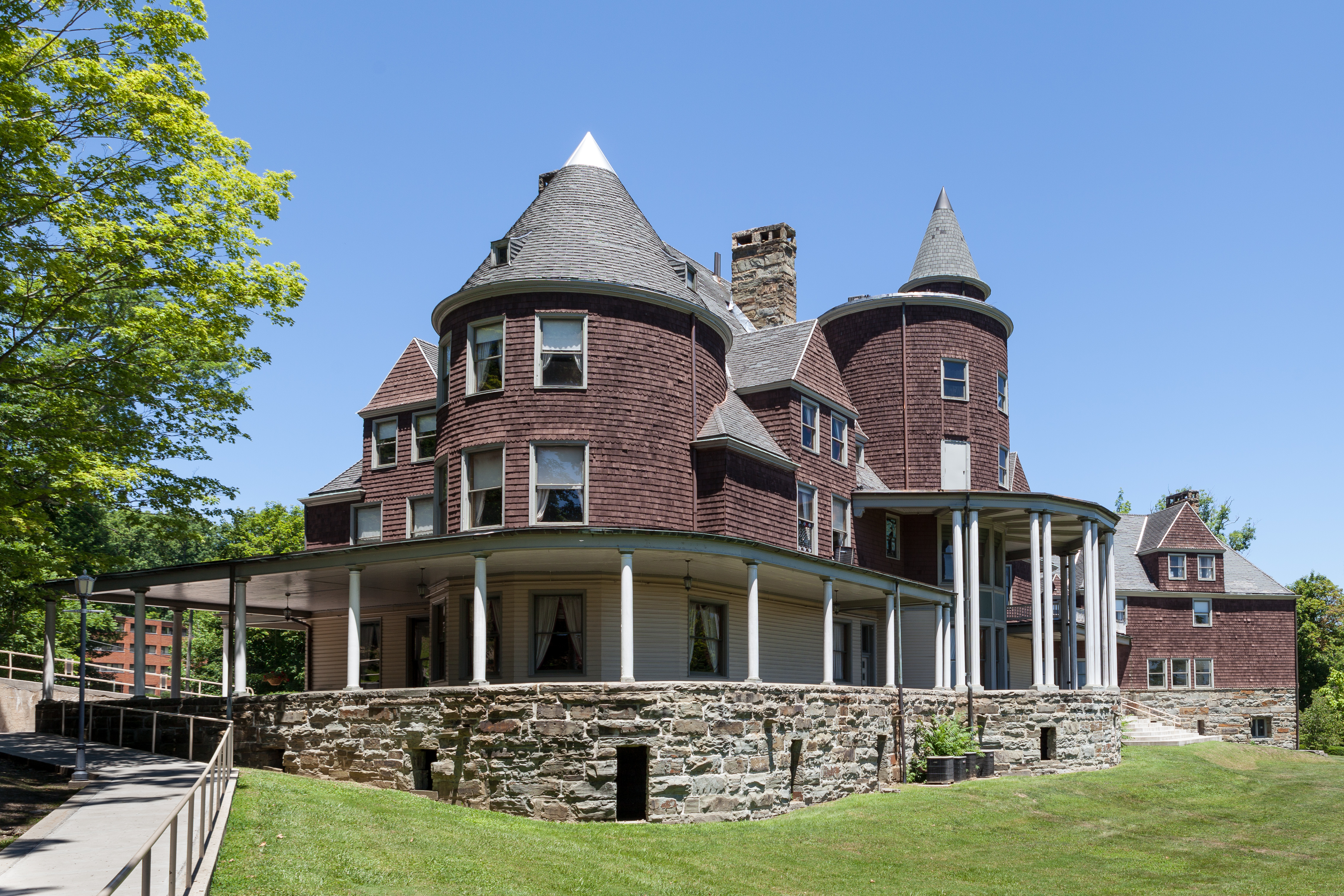
- The southwest corner, July 2014

- Location within West Virginia Location within the United States
- Location: Davis and Elkins College Campus, Elkins, West Virginia
- Coordinates: 38°55′51″N 79°50′50″W
- Area: 0.8 acres (0.32 ha)
- Built: 1890
- Architect: Charles T. Mott
- Part of: Davis and Elkins Historic District (ID96001129)
- NRHP reference No.: 82004329

Significant dates
- Added to NRHP: September 2, 1982
- Designated NHLDCP: June 7, 1998

Senator Stephen Benton Elkins House, also known as Halliehurst, is an historic mansion located at Elkins, Randolph County, West Virginia. It was designed by architect Charles T. Mott and built in 1890, as a summer home for U.S. Senator Stephen Benton Elkins. It consists of a three-story main block with hipped roof and service wing. The roof is punctuated by towers, turrets, dormers, and chimneys. A porch surrounds much of the first floor. It features a two-story portico with columns around a central, flat roofed tower. Located on a mountainside, it commands a view of the valley beneath and the forest and mountain peaks that surround the valley. In 1923, the house and approximately 60 acres of land were deeded to Davis & Elkins College by Sen. Elkins' widow.

In 1990 the mansion and the gatehouse were restored. Frantz Pugh of Elkins was recognized in 1990 when the college named him their Volunteer of the Year and designated him their heritage buildings restorationist and conserver of the fabric as a result of the restoration effort in reclaiming the Halliehurst mansion and its gatehouse on campus.

It was listed on the National Register of Historic Places in 1982. It is a contributing property in the Davis and Elkins Historic District, a National Historic Landmark.
