= Richard Hudnut =

American businessman (1855–1928)

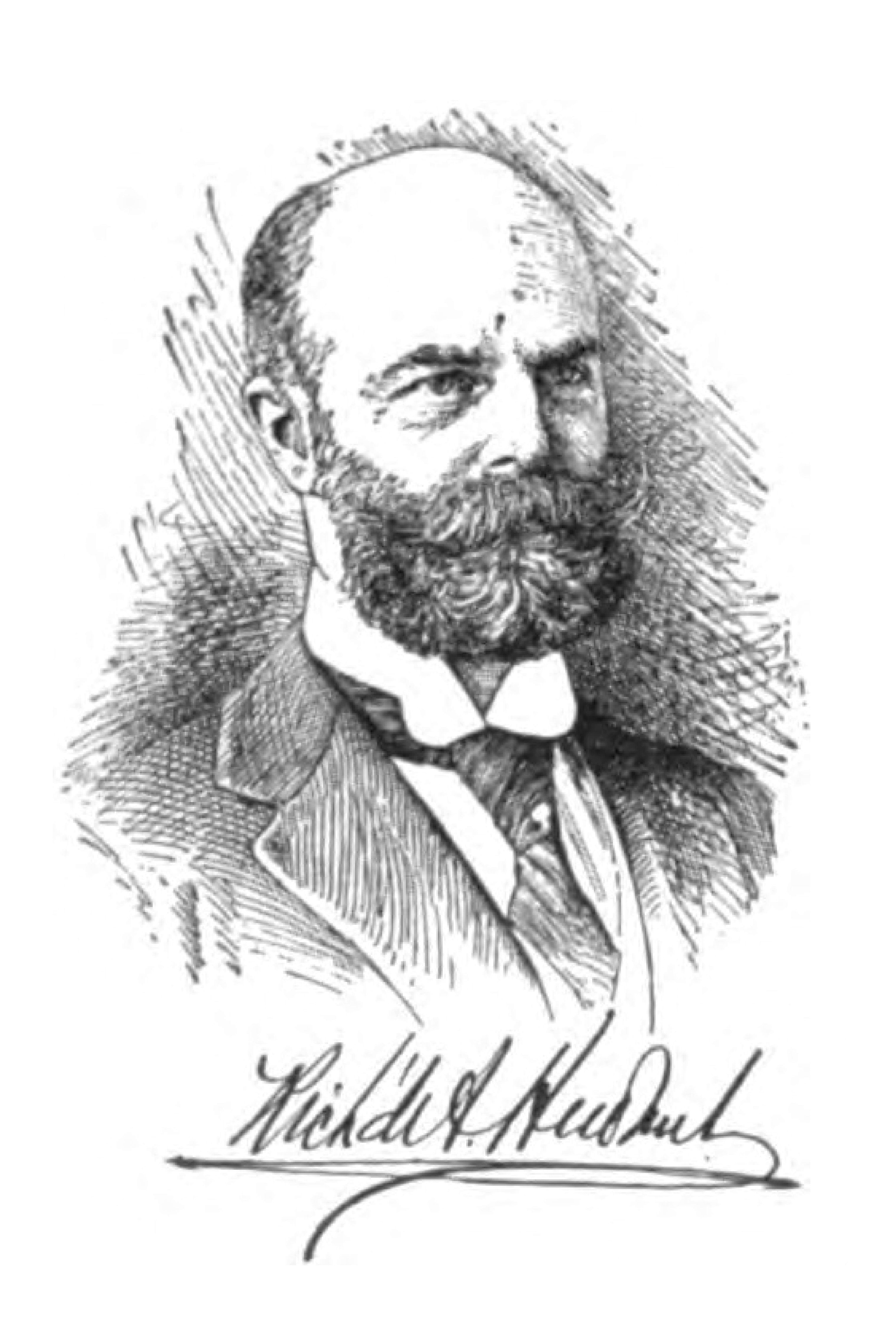
- Born: June 2, 1855
- Died: October 30, 1928 (aged 73); Juan-les-Pins, France
- Occupations: Cosmetologist, perfumer, pharmacist
- Known for: Cosmetics and perfumes
- Spouses: Evelyn Isabell Beals; Winifred Kimball

Richard Alexander Hudnut (June 2, 1855 – October 30, 1928) was an American businessman recognized as the first American to achieve international success in cosmetics manufacturing. The company once maintained separate US and European headquarters on Fifth Avenue in New York City and on the Rue de la Paix in Paris, respectively.

Although his fortune had been built around cosmetics and beauty products, he preferred to be known as a "perfumer".

== Family ==
Hudnut's father Alexander (1830–1900) was a pharmacist with a store at Broadway and Ann Street in New York City. His mother was Margaret (née Parker). The name Hudnut derives from Hodnet, Shropshire. After graduating from Princeton University, Richard Hudnut toured France and returned with the idea of introducing French-style perfumes and cosmetics to American women. In 1880 he registered his name as a trademark in both France and the United States.

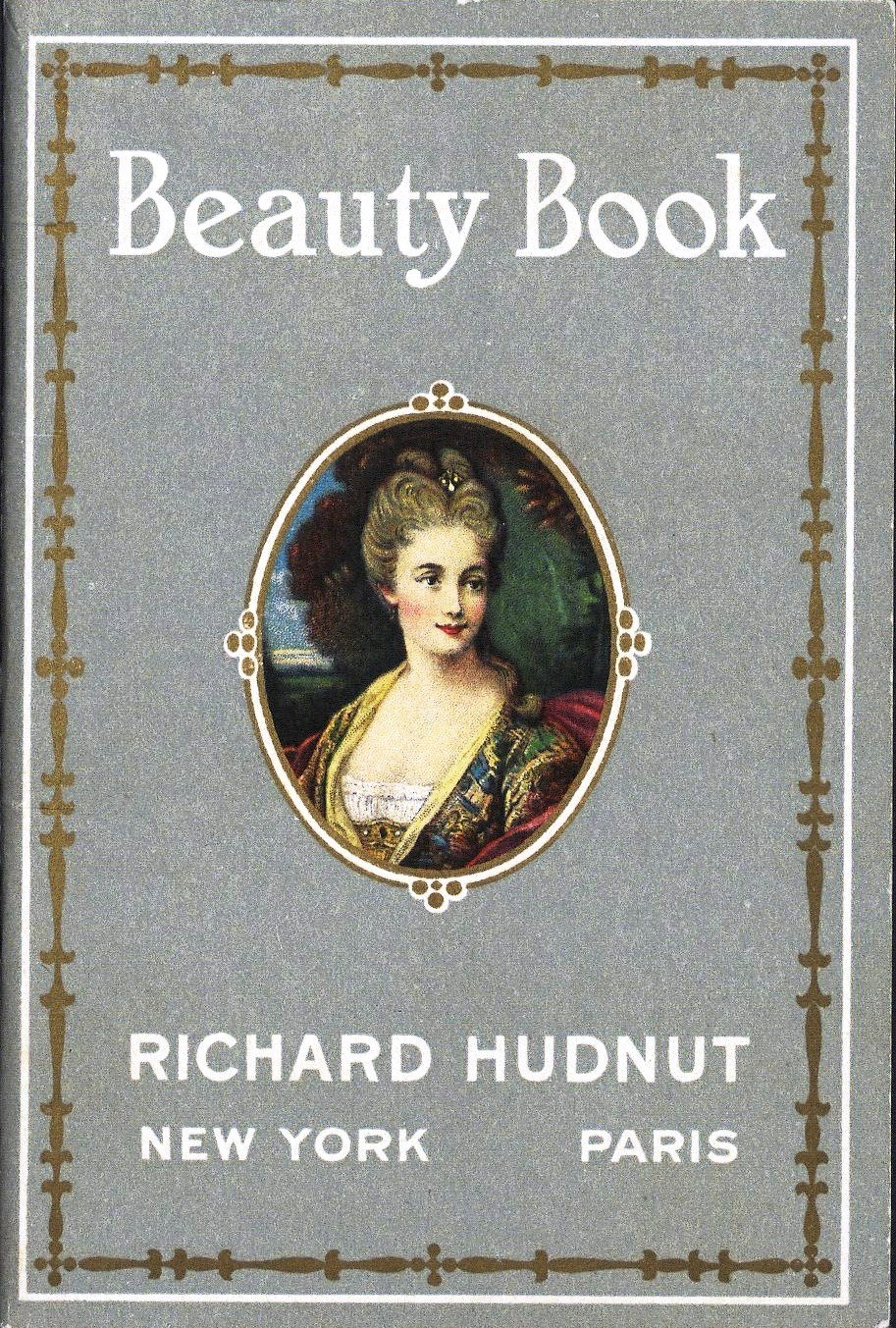
Beauty Book by Richard Hudnut

Hudnut began by transforming the family drugstore into an elegant showroom. The makeover was such that the shop now became a tourist attraction, and Hudnut's business flourished. In time, Hudnut's products became so widely known that he closed the retail store and focused on marketing his product lines through wholesale distributors.

One of the keys to Hudnut's success was that he sold his less expensive fragrances "on approval". After the consumer paid with postage stamps or a money order, Hudnut shipped the perfume. If the customer wasn't satisfied, Hudnut refunded the money.

Having made his fortune, Hudnut sold the business in 1916 and retired to France.

The Richard Hudnut Corporation was acquired in 1916 by William R. Warner & Company, which became Warner-Hudnut in 1950, then Warner-Lambert in 1955. In 2000, Warner-Lambert was purchased by Pfizer Corporation.

== Perfumes and Cosmetics ==
Early Richard Hudnut fragrances included Queen Anne Cologne (1880), Violet Sec (1896), Aimée (1902), DuBarry (1903), Vanity (1910), and Three Flowers (1915).

Product lines included Du Barry, Three Flowers, Gemey, Marvelous, and a line of hair care products. Hudnut's beauty products were sold in department stores. The company also introduced the Du Barry Success Course, which ran from 1940 until the early 1950s and was designed with the assistance of Mary Brooks Picken.

To maintain his image, Hudnut required dealers to sign a contract stating that not only would they not discount his products, but also not bundle his products with gifts of any kind (so as to, in effect, lower their purchase price.) Although this policy was outlawed in certain states (e.g., Texas), in states where it was enforceable, the company enforced it to the extent of the law. In 1922, the government charged Richard Hudnut Inc. with conspiracy to violate the Sherman Antitrust Act as a result of its price-control activities. Richard Hudnut, Inc. and Richard Hudnut Sales Company, a subsidiary, were again charged with unfair trade practices in 1936 under the Robinson-Patman Act.

== Incidents ==
Several colorful incidents marked Richard Hudnut's life.

In 1894, Richard Hudnut filed suit against the department store Carroll, Beadle & Mudge of Rochester, New York for allegedly selling imitation Hudnut perfume as the real thing.

In 1901, the U.S. Customs Service sent an officer to his house to inquire about certain imports that Hudnut was receiving at a particularly low cost, as no duty was being paid. The officer was told that Hudnut was not at home.

In 1901, patent solicitor Oscar Michel was arrested on $5,000 bail for passing a bogus check to Richard Hudnut. Hudnut had had the solicitor file a patent application for him but when he didn't receive it from the patent office, he demanded his money back from Michel. The check was returned "N.G." (non-negotiable).

In 1902, Richard Hudnut was exonerated on smuggling charges alleged to have been conducted by a steamship steward. The steward was arrested for smuggling violet essence and musk into the United States, some of which was traced to Hudnut's pharmacy. On further investigation, the collector entirely cleared Hudnut of any wrongdoing.

In March 1903, Richard Hudnut bought a suite of Louis Quinze chairs for $220 at an auction of actress Ada Rehan's personal property.

In 1905, upon returning from vacation at his Adirondacks camp, Hudnut discovered that his New York apartment had been burglarized; even his grand piano was gone.

In 1909, Hudnut applied for a tax refund on alcohol which had been used in cosmetics which were to be exported. The Collector of Customs granted the request, but demanded precise accounting of the quantities used in manufacturing, including any waste.

In 1915, Swift & Company sued Richard Hudnut for trademark infringement. Swift had registered the trademark "Vanity Fair" and challenged Hudnut's right to use the name "Vanity". The court ruled in favor of the plaintiff, in spite of the fact that Hudnut had registered his trademark earlier than Swift. The grounds were that Hudnut had used the name "Vanity" only once, and that use had not been public; it had been used on an invoice only.

In 1920, in another trade-mark dispute over the name "Nara" which Hudnut had registered and which was disputed by plaintiff Phillips who had registered the trade-mark "Nyra", Hudnut prevailed on appeal on the same legal principle that had found against him in Swift v. Hudnut. (Note: "The common law, and not the trade-mark statutes, defines what constitutes a trade-mark. The trade-mark recognized by the common law is generally the outgrowth of a considerable period of use rather than a sudden invention. The exclusive right to it grows out of its use and not its mere adoption. (Trade Mark Cases, i00 U.S. 82, 84) The trader must apply the mark to a vendible commodity and must actually put the commodity so marked on the market. Phillips v. Hudnut et al. (1920) 273 O.G. 629, Court of Appeals of the District of Columbia)

In 1922, after he had retired from business, Hudnut's stepdaughter, Natacha Rambova, married Rudolph Valentino, who had not completed his divorce from his first wife.

== Other interests ==
Richard Hudnut was also the president of the Hudnut Realty Co.

== Marriages ==
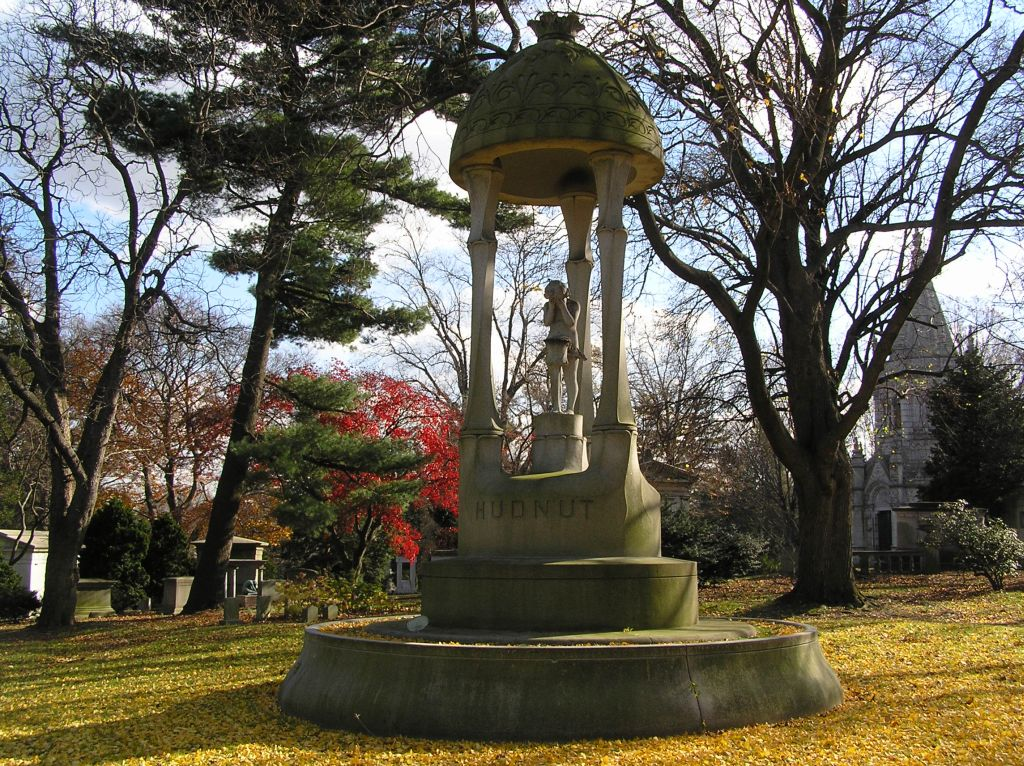
The monument to Richard Hudnut in Woodlawn Cemetery, Bronx, NY

Richard Hudnut was married twice. His first wife Evelyn Isabell Beals (d. 1919), whom he married on May 14, 1881, was the daughter of granite dealer Horace Beals, and Jane A. Dwyer, better known as the Duchess of Catelluccia.

He married his second wife, Winifred Kimball Hudnut (1871 – 1957), the mother of Natacha Rambova (née Winifred Shaugnessy), on June 1 1920. Hudnut was her fourth husband.

== Community service ==
Hudnut was a member of several professional organizations including the American Pharmaceutical Association, the Manufacturing Perfumers' Association of the United States of which he had been variously, chairman, vice-president and treasurer, the American Geographical Society, the Metropolitan Museum and the Republican Club of New York.

== Death ==
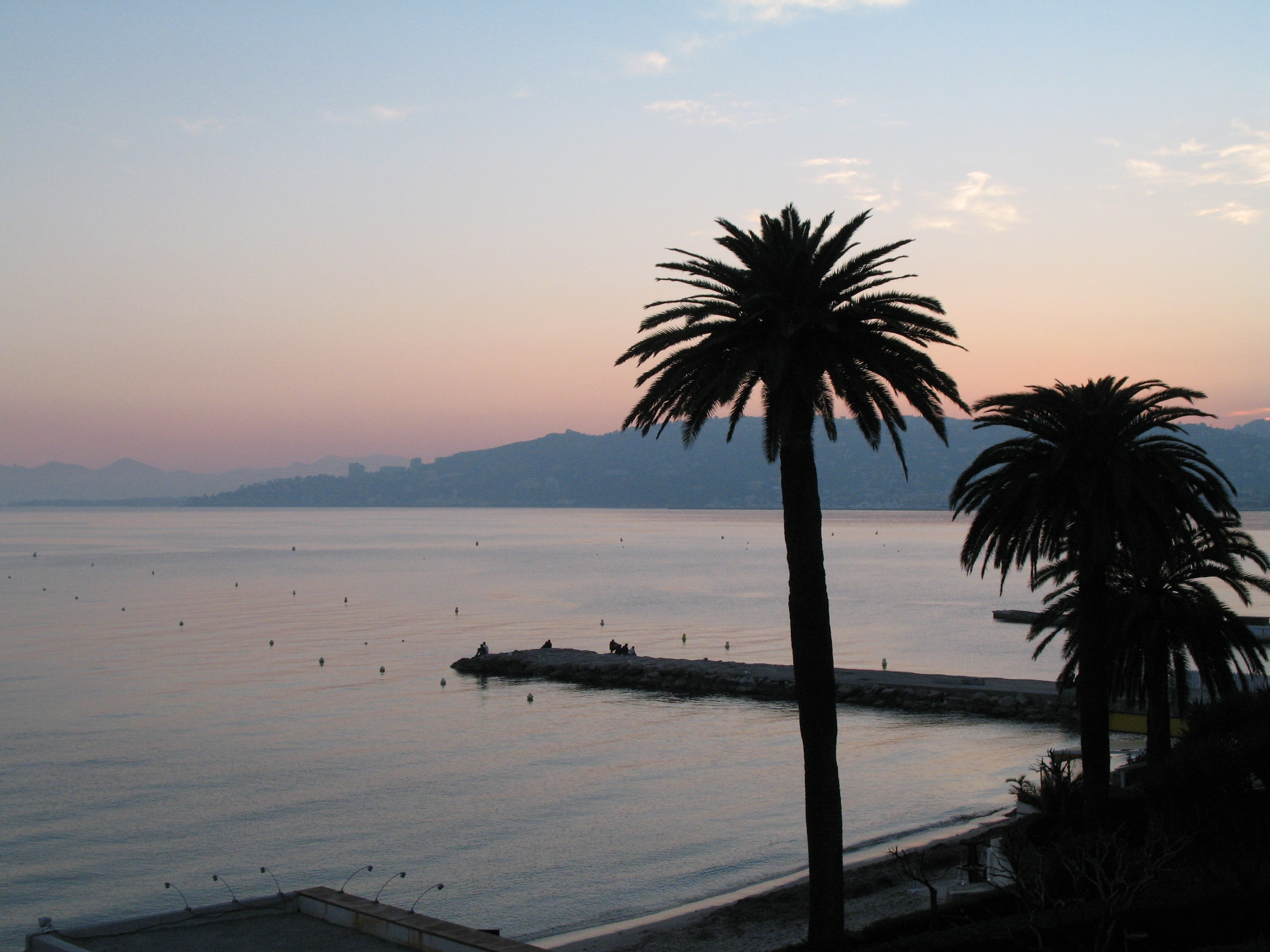
View of the lagoon in Juan-les-pins

Richard Hudnut died in 1928, at the age of 73, at Juan-les-Pins, France, where he owned a château. He is buried in Woodlawn Cemetery in The Bronx, New York City.

== Richard Hudnut products (1915) ==
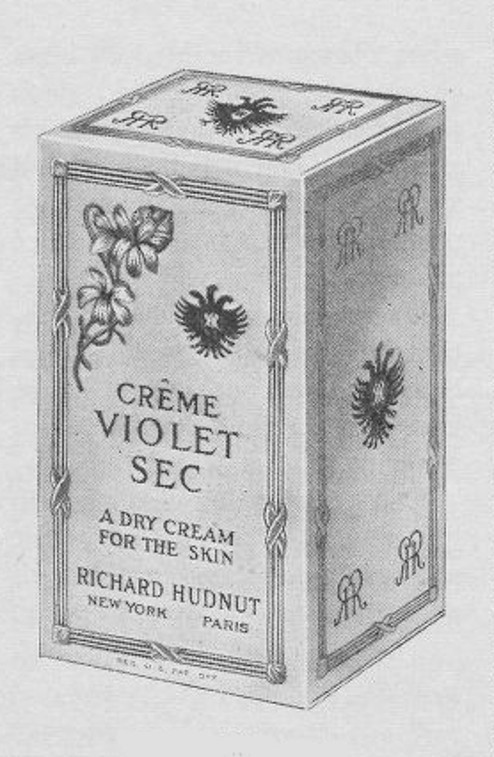
Skin cream

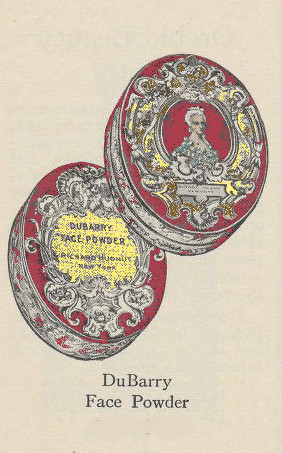
DuBarry face powder

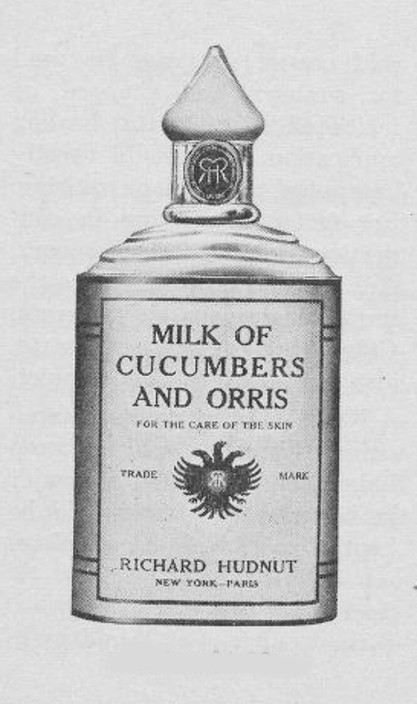
Milk of Cucumbers and Orris

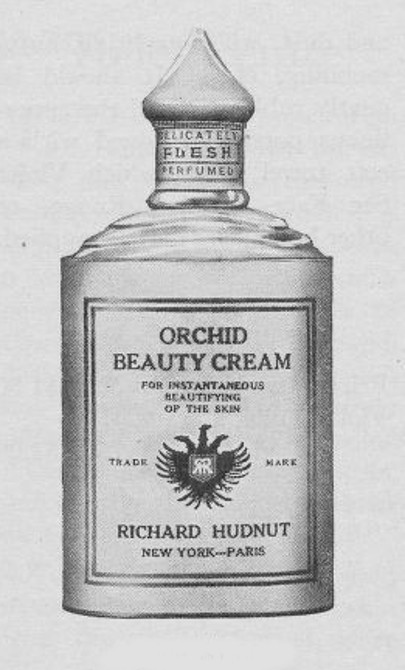
Orchid Beauty Cream

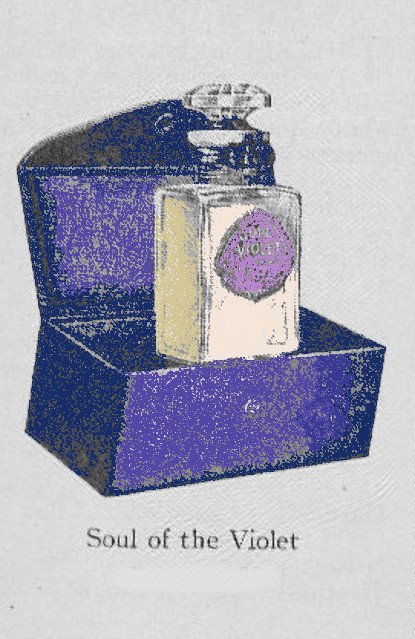
"Soul of the Violet" perfume

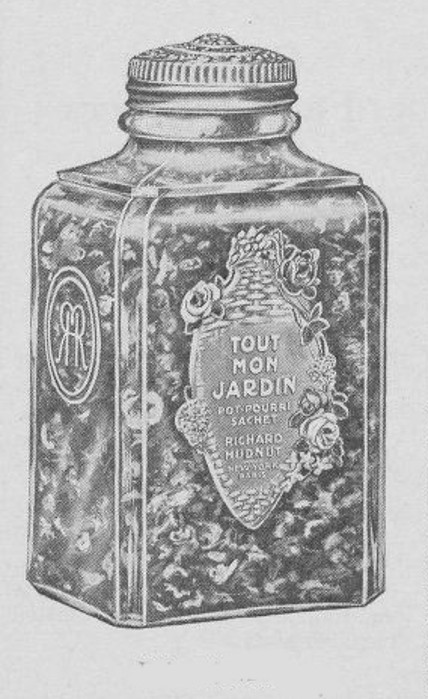
"Tout mon jardin" pot-pourri

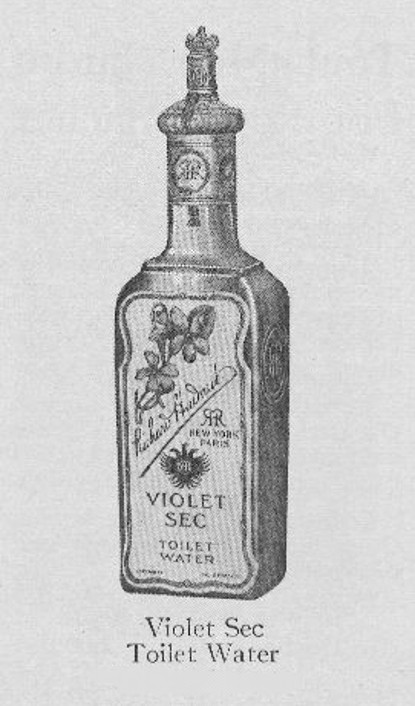
"Violet sec" toilet water
