= Daniel S. Lamont =

American politician

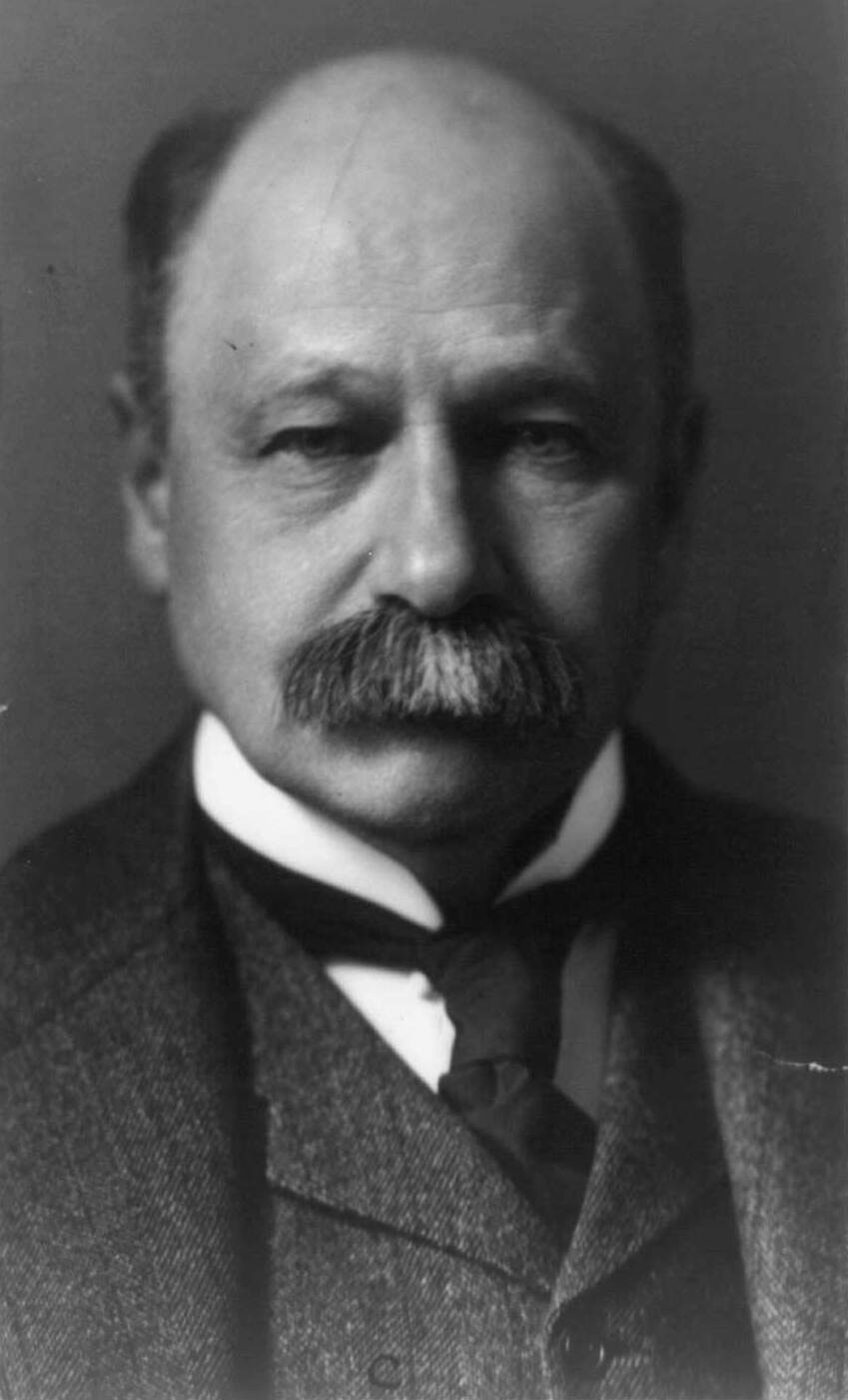

39th United States Secretary of War
- In office March 5, 1893 – March 4, 1897
- President: Grover Cleveland
- Preceded by: Stephen Elkins
- Succeeded by: Russell A. Alger

Private Secretary to the President
- In office March 4, 1885 – March 4, 1889
- President: Grover Cleveland
- Preceded by: Fred J. Phillips
- Succeeded by: Elijah W. Halford

Personal details
- Born: Daniel Scott Lamont; February 9, 1851 McGraw, New York, U.S.
- Died: July 23, 1905 (aged 54) Millbrook, New York, U.S.
- Resting place: Woodlawn Cemetery
- Party: Democratic
- Spouse: Juliet Lamont
- Education: Union College

Daniel Scott Lamont (February 9, 1851 – July 23, 1905) was the United States Secretary of War during Grover Cleveland's second term.

== Early life ==
Lamont was born on his family's farm in McGraw, New York (then called McGrawville) on February 9, 1851. He was a son of John B. Lamont, a merchant from Cortlandville, and Elizabeth (née Scott) Lamont. Lamont, of Scotch ancestry, had a family lineage that could be traced back as far as 1250.

He waited on customers from behind the counter in his father's store. He attended the Central Academy, successor of New York Central College, in McGraw. He attended Union College at Schenectady, New York. While attending Union College, he joined the Delta Upsilon fraternity.

== Career ==
He was employed as engrossing clerk and assistant journal clerk in the state capitol at Albany, New York, was a clerk on the staff of the Democratic state central committee in 1872 and was chief clerk of the New York department of state from 1875 to 1882.

In 1883, through his mentor Daniel Manning, Lamont was assigned to then-New York Governor Grover Cleveland's staff as a political prompter. He became private and military secretary with the honorary rank of colonel on the governor's staff the same year and continued in his service after Cleveland became president in 1885. Lamont also held employment with William C. Whitney in his business ventures in 1889.

From March 5, 1893, to March 5, 1897, Lamont served as United States Secretary of War in President Cleveland's cabinet. Throughout his tenure, he urged the adoption of a three-battalion infantry regiment as a part of a general modernization and strengthening of the Army. Furthermore, Lamont recommended the construction of a central hall of records to house Army archives and urged that Congress authorize the marking of important battlefields in the manner adopted for Antietam. He also recommended that lands being used by Apache prisoners at Fort Sill be acquired for their permanent use and their prisoner status be terminated.

=== Later life ===
After his service as Secretary of War, Lamont was vice president of the Northern Pacific Railway Company from 1898 to 1904. He was also a director of numerous banks and corporations. In 1889, he went into business with William C. Whitney (Cleveland's Secretary of the Navy) and Oliver Hazard Payne (organizer of the American Tobacco trust).

In August 1904, he was considered as a candidate for Governor of New York, with The New York Times writing "Qualifying experience in large public and private affairs, ability and executive capacity already demonstrated in high office, and personal character quite above all impeachment or assault unmistakably designate Daniel S. Lamont as a fit candidate for the Democrats of New York to name for the Governorship."

== Personal life ==
Lamont was married to Juliet Kinney and had three surviving daughters, Frances, Elizabeth (Bessie), and Katherine. A fourth daughter, Julia, died in 1902 at 18 years old. Lamont spent his early summers in the Gray Gables neighborhood in Bourne, Massachusetts, on Cape Cod, near where Grover Cleveland owned a house. Cleveland and Lamont were known to have many parties during the summers. His old house still stands. In 1888, he began spending his summers on the coast of Maine and bought a house in Sorrento known as Blueberry Lodge, which also still stands today.

Lamont died at his country home, Altamount in Millbrook, New York, on July 23, 1905, at aged 54. He was buried in Woodlawn Cemetery, in The Bronx, New York City. After his death, his widow continued the family's close relationship with the Clevelands.

Political offices
Preceded by Stephen B. Elkins	U.S. Secretary of War; Served under: Grover Cleveland; March 5, 1893 – March 4, 1897	Succeeded by Russell A. Alger
