= William Matheus Sullivan =

Sullivan

William Matheus Sullivan (1885–1947) was a prominent lawyer and his passion for classical music led him to become the founder of a renowned music festival. Moreover, at his death, The William Matheus Sullivan Musical Foundation (also known the Sullivan Foundation) was founded by his bequest.

== Biography ==
William Matheus Sullivan was born in 1885, in Brooklyn, New York.

Sullivan became the Metropolitan Opera's attorney and he was the attorney also of many of the Met singers. He sponsored singers and musicians who would become famous in their own fields. In 1936 Sullivan moved to a large house in Ridgefield, Connecticut called "Dunrovin". Sullivan was also an art collector and he owned The Holy Family, by Anthony van Dyck, that hung in the carriage house after it became his playhouse; the painting is now at the Kunsthistorisches Museum in Vienna. From 1938 the playhouse was the first home of the local music festival. The visiting singers included the soprano Lily Pons, the tenor Edward Johnson, Grace Moore, Lawrence Tibbett and Geraldine Farrar. Sullivan donated the profit from the concerts to the American Red Cross during World War II. The festival ended with Sullivan's death in 1947. "Dunrovin" burned to the ground in an accidental fire in the 1970s, while the playhouse became a private residence.

He was a close friend of Edward VIII, the Duke of Windsor, who donated him his English sheepdog.

Sullivan is buried in Woodlawn Cemetery (Bronx, New York) with his partner, interior decorator Aaron "Arcie" Lubetkin (August 27, 1887 - September 1955). Lubetkin was one of the 13 sons of Russian immigrants Max Lubetkin (1851-1919) and Rachel Miriam Madansky (1857-1919). At the death of Lubetkin and then Hoenig, the fund was turned over to form the "William Matheus Sullivan Musical Foundation".

Arcie Lubetkin donated the Hammond electric organ to the Mead Memorial Chapel, Waccabuc, New York, in memory of Sullivan. The organ was dedicated in September 1947 by David Williams, organist at St. Bartholomew's Episcopal Church (Manhattan). The organ is important from a heritage point of view, since there are not many Hammond organs still existing. The commemorative plaque reads "Remembrance. The only paradise from which we cannot be driven."

== Legacy ==
The William Matheus Sullivan Musical Foundation is a non-profit organization dedicated to finding, developing, and furthering the careers of promising opera singers within the United States. It was founded through a bequest of William Matheus Sullivan.
