= Jan Eriksson (footballer, born 1962) =

Swedish footballer

Personal information
- Full name: Jan Erik Wilhelm Eriksson
- Date of birth: 27 April 1962 (age 64)
- Place of birth: Stockholm, Sweden
- Position: Defender

Youth career
- 1968–1976: Älvsjö AIK

College career
Years	Team	Apps	(Gls)
1984–1985	Davis & Elkins College		

Senior career*
Years	Team	Apps	(Gls)
1977–1982	AIK	35	(0)
1983	Standard Liège		
1983–1984	AIK	0	(0)
1986–1988	Spårvägens GoIF		
1989	Vasalunds IF		
1990–1992	Spårvägens GoIF		

International career
1979	Sweden U19	9	(0)
1981–1982	Sweden U21	6	(0)
- * Club domestic league appearances and goals

Jan Erik Wilhelm "Janne" Eriksson (born 27 April 1962) is a Swedish former professional footballer who played as a defender. He played in Allsvenskan for AIK, had a brief spell with Standard Liège in Belgium, and played collegiately in the United States. He also represented the Sweden U19 and U21 teams.

== Club career ==
=== Early career and AIK ===
Eriksson started off his footballing career with Älvsjö AIK before signing with AIK as a youth player in 1977. He made his Allsvenskan debut for AIK on 4 May 1981 in a home game at Råsunda Stadium against Kalmar FF, playing for 90 minutes at right back in a 3–1 win. He made another 23 appearances for AIK during the 1981 season as AIK finished 8th. Eriksson missed the first half of the 1982 season with an ankle injury but played in 11 games during the second half of the season as the team finished 11th in the table.

=== Standard Liege, return to AIK, and college soccer ===
In January 1983, Eriksson signed with Standard Liège after impressing during a two-week trial with the club. However, he only stayed with the club for two months before returning to AIK ahead of the 1983 Allsvenskan season.

Eriksson's return to AIK was unsuccessful, as he failed to appear in any games and instead decided to leave Sweden in 1984 to play college soccer in the United States for Davis & Elkins College. After a successful 1984 NCAA Division II season, Eriksson was named a 1984 NCAA Division II All-American as he helped his team win the 1984 West Virginia Intercollegiate Athletic Conference.

=== Return to Sweden and retirement ===
After spending two years in the United States, Eriksson returned to Sweden in 1986 and represented Spårvägens GoIF and Vasalunds IF before retiring from competitive football following an Achilles' heel injury in 1992.

== International career ==
Eriksson represented the Sweden U19 a total of nine times. He also played six games for the Sweden U21 team.

== Honours ==
Davis & Elkins College

- West Virginia Intercollegiate Athletic Conference (WVIAC): 1984

Individual

- NCAA Division II All-American: 1984
- All-WVIAC: 1984
