= Alice Foote MacDougall =

American coffee wholesaler, restaurateur and business owner

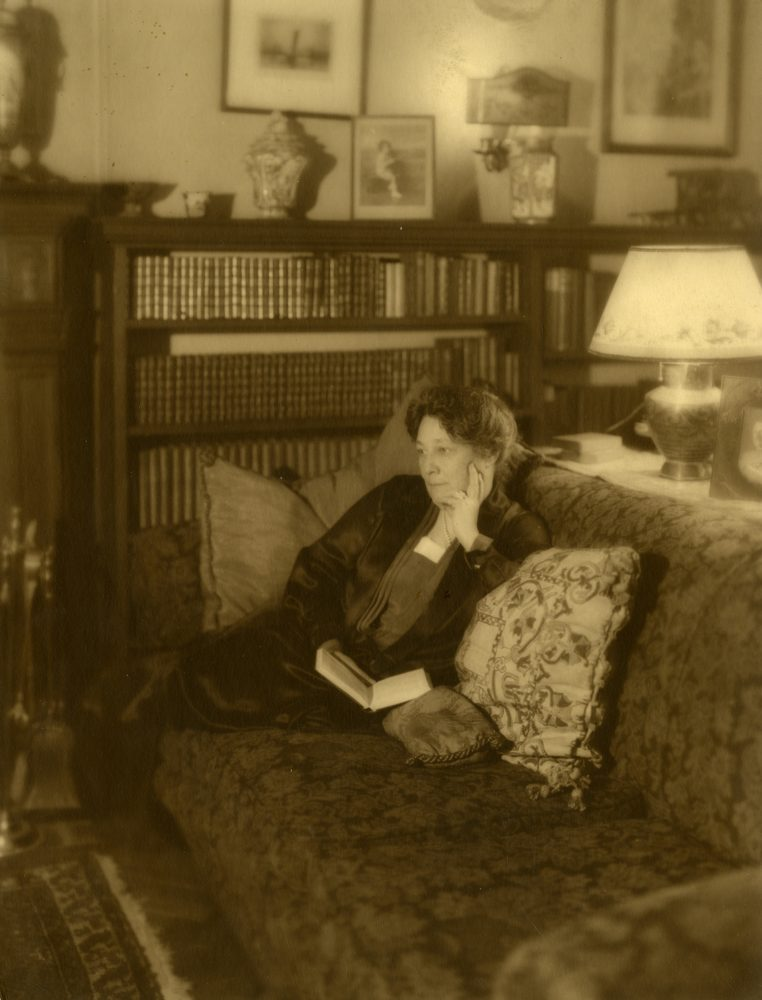
- Born: Alice Foote; March 2, 1867; New York City, New York, U.S.
- Died: February 10, 1945 (aged 77); New York City, New York, U.S.
- Resting place: Woodlawn Cemetery, Bronx, New York
- Occupation: Restaurateur
- Years active: 1907–1945
- Spouse: Allan MacDougall
- Children: 3

Alice Foote MacDougall (March 2, 1867 – February 10, 1945) was an American coffee wholesaler, restaurateur, and business owner. Born and raised in New York City, MacDougall was a member of New York gentry – her great-grandfather was the mayor of New York City from 1821 to 1824. She began a coffee roasting-and-retail business in 1907, and eventually established several eateries around New York City.

== Early life ==
MacDougall was born on May 2, 1867, in Washington Square, New York City, in her great-grandmother's home. MacDougall's father, Emerson Foote, was a Wall Street financer. Her mother was a housewife.

MacDougall accompanied her father on several business trips to Europe, where she was exposed to the local restaurants. This is thought to be the inspiration for the European-style decor that would eventually adorn her eateries.

Emerson Foote was an unsuccessful businessman. During MacDougall's childhood, he experienced the bankruptcy of multiple business ventures. As a result, MacDougall's family lost much of their fortune.

== Personal life ==
=== Marriage ===
At the age of 20, MacDougall married Allan MacDougall, a 34-year-old door-to-door salesman. However, the marriage was deeply unhappy. In her book Alice Foote MacDougall, the autobiography of a business woman, Alice described her marriage as going "slowly, painfully, through the dark mazes of dreadful disillusionment."

The couple had three children; Gladys, Allan and Don.

Allan struggled as a businessman. He worked as a coffee wholesaler; however, his business ventures proved largely unsuccessful. The MacDougalls saw their wealth deteriorate and their social status fall.

In 1907, Allan fell ill. He eventually died and left his wife nearly penniless at the age of forty. She was forced to gain employment to support herself and her three young children.

=== Social and political stances ===
Alice Foote MacDougall's entrance into business and her subsequent bold career went against her stance as an anti-suffragist. She publicly declared herself a "mid-Victorian" and maintained that women should not have the right to vote or aspire to any other role besides a wife and mother.

In December 1935, she sent a letter to the New York Times, stating that "(m)ost (of course not all) women are an intrusion in the orderly procession of commercial life. Untrained, unfitted, full of tradition, prejudices, and inhibitions, she is the fool who rushes in where wise men fear to tread".

== Early career ==
MacDougall's coffee business operations began in 1907 under the name A.F. MacDougall. She used a false name, since many prospective customers in the early 1900s in New York held negative views about women in business.

In the commercial center of the city, MacDougall rented a small room on Front Street for her coffee-roasting operations. MacDougall performed this almost exclusively without outside help, excluding $1,000 in initial financial assistant from a friend of her father's.

MacDougall's business was eventually incorporated under the name Alice Foote MacDougall and Sons with its executive offices at 139 Front Street.

=== Advertising ===
At the start of her business venture, MacDougall determined potential customers in her vicinity and marketed to them through direct-by-mail advertising. The advertisements included positive statements promoting the high-quality, unique, and convenient nature of her roasted coffee products. She also was willing to travel outside New York City to reach customers by selling to customers throughout the broader New England area. This included hospitals, hotels, colleges, and various clubs.

== Restaurant ownership and operation ==
=== The Little Coffee Shop ===
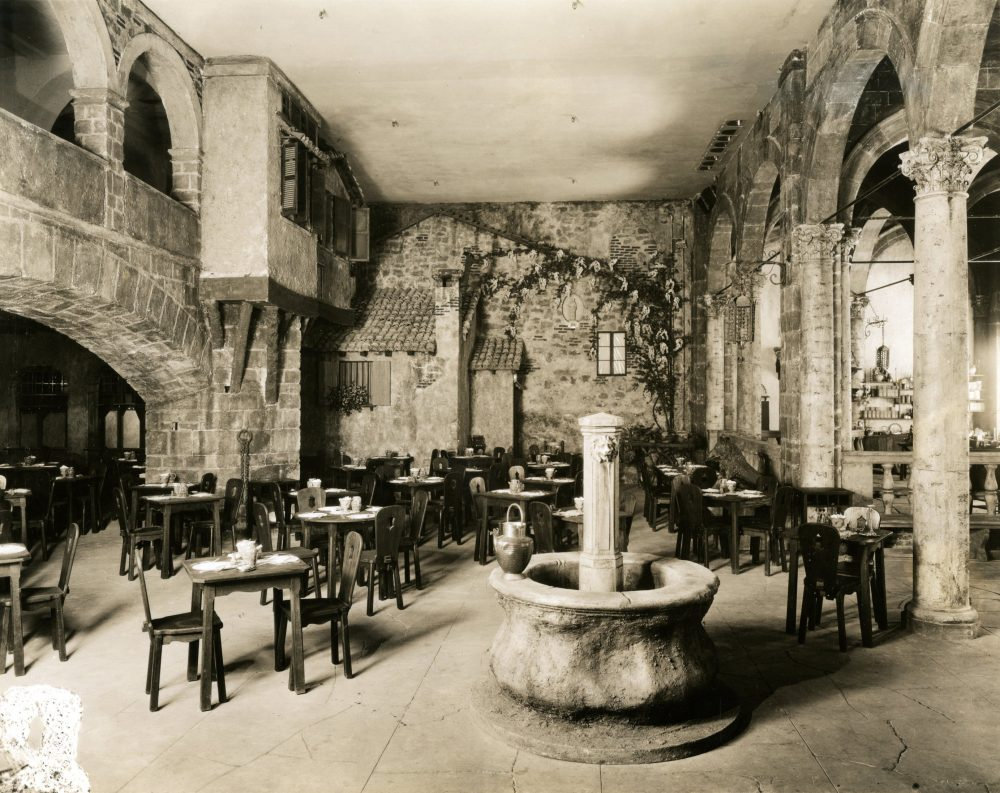
Interior of Firenze, 6 West 46th Street, New York City

MacDougall's first establishment, the Little Coffee Shop in Grand Central Station, opened in 1919. The establishment was originally opened with the purpose of promoting her roasted coffee products. However, the shop was initially unsuccessful. Based on request from prospective customers to taste her coffee products before considering making a purchase, MacDougall set up chairs and tables for this purpose. This change transformed shop into a coffee house to operate as both a cafe and a retail outlet for MacDougall's products. Waffles and hot coffee were the house specialty. These menu items become the inspiration for her first publication, Coffee and Waffles. Her small coffee business was only the beginning of her successes, and within ten years MacDougall had opened four other coffee houses in New York state.

=== The Cortile ===
The proceeding expansion of her empire oversaw the opening a coffee house on 37 West 43rd Street in Manhattan. The establishment was not initially named The Cortile, but in 1923 MacDougall changed the decor of the classic southern-style coffeehouse it into an indoor replica of a Mediterranean-style courtyard and the name along with it to better suit the new style.

=== The Piazzetta ===
Following the establishment of The Cortile, an eatery named The Piazzetta was opened. This was located at 20 West 47th Street in Manhattan.

=== Firenze ===
The following addition to MacDougall's restaurant empire was the Firenze, located on 6 West 46th Street in Manhattan.

=== Sevillia ===
The Sevillia was the largest and most elaborately decorated of all of MacDougall's restaurants. It was located at West 57th Street, Manhattan. This was the fifth eatery MacDougall opened during her career. It was a Spanish-style restaurant in which the waiters and waitresses wore mantillas and red Iberian costumes. The restaurant featured several distinct sections, including an Alhambra Room, an Early Renaissance Room, and once Prohibition ended in 1933, a Wine Shop was also added. By the late 1920s MacDougall had signed a long term one million dollar lease for her fifth coffee house.

=== Other eateries ===
By the end of her career MacDougall had established, owned, and operated nine restaurants and coffee houses around New York state. Other locations included The Auberge on 129 Maiden Lane, Mens Grill on 36 West 44th Street, The Marionettes Coffee Shop on 10 East 23rd Street and Playland Casino in Rye, New York.

=== Retail operations ===
Throughout her career MacDougall maintained her retail coffee roasting business, branding her coffee products under the name Bowling Green Coffee. Her personal brand of coffee was exclusively served at venues and the option to purchase a bag was always advertised to customers. She also maintained waffles as a menu item for each location, as her first food offering during the early stages of The Little Coffee Shop had become publicly known as her signature dish. Other retail items advertised for sale included tea, preserves relishes, and candy which customer could purchased at Firenze, The Piazzetta, The Cortile and the Playland Casino.

== Restaurant style ==
Several restaurants in MacDougall's empire were decorated in a distinctly European style. This was unique at a time where the majority of New York City restaurants and cafes were basically decorated. The focus on European decor began in 1923 with MacDougall coffee house on 43rd Street being renovated to replicate a Mediterranean courtyard and renaming it The Cortile.

MacDougall was one of many women restaurateurs at the time who used peasant pottery rather than up-market restaurant china that was more common in eating establishments around the city. She expressed her preference for the restaurant styles that evoked "the intimate feeling we used to have when we gathered around the dining-room at home".

Further European embellishments included a statement in the menu for The Cortile that offered "With each meal or purchase of pottery of 50c or more Miss Rosa Rosella will interpret your Character and Predict your Future. Her Gratuities are Voluntary".

While the visual aesthetics of MacDougall's eateries were distinctly European, her menu items were largely American-style offerings. Fried chicken, lamb chops, and kidney and mushrooms on toast are all items that were found on her establishments' menus.

== Publications ==
=== Coffee and Waffles ===
MacDougall was first published in 1926 with the release of her cookbook, Coffee and Waffles, just before opening of her fifth coffee house. The book covers a broad range of recipes for "cakes, sandwiches, salads, coffee and tea". Additionally, the book includes the author's personal contemplations regarding the entertaining and life.

=== The Autobiography of a Business Woman ===
Her second book, The Autobiography of a Business Woman, was published in 1928. The autobiography details the successes and failures of her life as a daughter, a mother, a wife and a successful business women.

=== The Secret of Successful Restaurants ===
In 1929 MacDougall published her third book, The Secret of Successful Restaurants. The book is a detailed guide to readers on how to own and operating a successful restaurant. The guide even included hour-by-hour schedule that MacDougall set for her kitchen staff, waiters and waitresses and managers.

=== Alice Foote MacDougall's Cook Book ===
Her final publication, Alice Foote MacDougall's Cook Book, was released in 1935. The cook book was released during the Great Depression, so accordingly MacDougall placed emphasis on frugality in many of her recipes. In the beginning of the cook book MacDougall placed a short section titled "Reflections on Waste but Not Wasted Reflections" in which she provides money-saving tips and highlights the low-cost nature of the recipes found in proceeding chapters. One such tip suggest that the reader re-heat roast beef leftovers and either place them on toast or include them in a salad.

== Legacy ==
For many years MacDougall ran her business operations as the sole owner. During this time she recruited both her sons, Allan and Donald, to take on leadership roles in the business. Allan served as president while his brother Donald served as vice president. When her sons assumed these roles, MacDougall changed her position within the company to chairman and treasurer. At the height of success, MacDougall's restaurant empire included nine eateries in the state of New York. MacDougall's company transformed from a one-person operation to running a staff of 700 by 1927.

The popularity of MacDougall's restaurant empire in the 1920s and 1930s lead to her becoming a well-known, minor national celebrity. The attention from media came from the popularity of her restaurant chain in New York. MacDougall's Media attention largely focused on her restaurants' success in a "male-dominated wholesale coffee market".

=== Retirement ===
MacDougall's retired in 1935, prompted by the negative impacts of the Great Depression on her business. The loss of patronship over this period essentially bankrupted her restaurant empire. However, the actual cause of MacDougall's bankruptcy was her inability to meet obligatory regular lease payments of her $1 million lease on Sevilla. MacDougall documented her great regret over locking her company into the lease contract in Alice Foote MacDougall's Cook Book.

When MacDougall's restaurants went into bankruptcy she was forced to assume personal control of the business. She remained in this position until the time the entire company went bankrupt. She thereafter survived on the remaining retained profits from her restaurants and the financial support of her eldest son Allan.

She died at her home in Manhattan on February 10, 1945, at the age of 77. She was buried in Woodlawn Cemetery in The Bronx, New York City.
