= Davis & Elkins College =

Private college in Elkins, West Virginia, US

- Motto: Pro Christo Perstare; To Stand for Christ
- Type: Private college; Liberal arts college
- Established: 1904; 122 years ago
- Academic affiliations: Association of Presbyterian Colleges and Universities
- Endowment: $61.6 million
- President: Chris Wood
- Students: 683
- Location: Elkins, West Virginia, United States; 38°55′50″N 79°50′48″W
- Campus: 480 acres; Rural
- Nickname: Senators
- Sporting affiliations: NCAA Division II; Mountain East Conference – 21 teams
- Website: dewv.edu
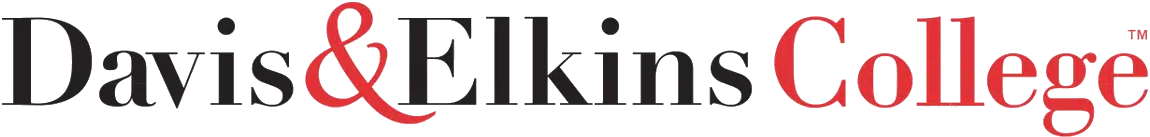

Davis & Elkins College (D&E) is a private college in Elkins, West Virginia, United States. It operates as a nonprofit liberal arts college and is affiliated with the Association of Presbyterian Colleges and Universities.

== History ==
The school was founded in 1904 and is affiliated with the Presbyterian Church. It was named for Henry G. Davis and his son-in-law Stephen B. Elkins, who were both members of the United States Senate from West Virginia.

While the original campus was located in south Elkins, the current campus was established when Hallie Davis Elkins donated Halliehurst Mansion and the surrounding estate in 1924.

The Aurora literary magazine was founded at D&E in 1963 (initially as the Adum magazine).

== Academics ==
D&E offers 45 degree programs, including 33 bachelor's degrees, 6 associate degrees, and 6 pre-professional programs. Students can also choose from 36 minors and an honors program.

The Morrison-Novakovic Center for Faith and Public Policy was founded at Davis & Elkins College in 2017.

The college also has a supported learning program hosted by the Naylor Learning Center (NLC). The NLC provides academic support, courses, and workshops for all students, and it has additional services for students with learning disabilities. Other academic services are provided by the Booth Library and the Davis & Elkins College Writing Center.

D&E also hosts a range of regular speaker series, including the William E. Phipps Religion & Philosophy Interdisciplinary Lecture and the Dr. Bill King Writer's Week event. The Phipps lectureship brings scholars from a wide range of backgrounds to campus to discuss religion, philosophy, and related disciplines, while Writer's Week is an endowed speaker series that hosts award-winning authors.

== Rankings and Enrollment ==
The college is number 15 among Regional Colleges South, according to US News rankings, and number 18 among Top Performers on Social Mobility.

The college enrolls 805 students, with a 12:1 student/faculty ratio.

== Athletics ==
The school's athletic teams, known as the Senators, compete in NCAA Division II, primarily in the Mountain East Conference (MEC). The Senators had been members of the West Virginia Intercollegiate Athletic Conference (WVIAC) from the league's founding in 1924 until its demise in 2013, after which the school joined the Great Midwest Athletic Conference (G-MAC). In 2019, the Senators joined the MEC, thereby reuniting with most of their historic rivals.

Men's sports include baseball, basketball, cross country, golf, lacrosse, soccer, swimming, tennis, indoor & outdoor track, and wrestling. All of these sports compete in the MEC except for lacrosse, which remains in the G-MAC because the MEC sponsors that sport only for women. Women's sports include triathlon, acrobatics & tumbling, basketball, cross country, lacrosse, soccer, softball, swimming, tennis, indoor & outdoor track, and volleyball. Acrobatics & tumbling and triathlon, neither of which the MEC sponsors, compete as independents (without a conference affiliation).

== Campus ==
D&E's main campus is located on a 180-acre area in Elkins, West Virginia. Part of the campus includes two historic mansions and accompanying buildings constructed between 1890 and 1924, as well as more modern buildings and dorms. The Davis & Elkins College campus includes six national register historic landmarks, four of which also comprise a National Historic District.

The college also owns the 300-acre George A. Myles Experimental Forest located outside of Beverly, West Virginia.

=== Campus Buildings ===
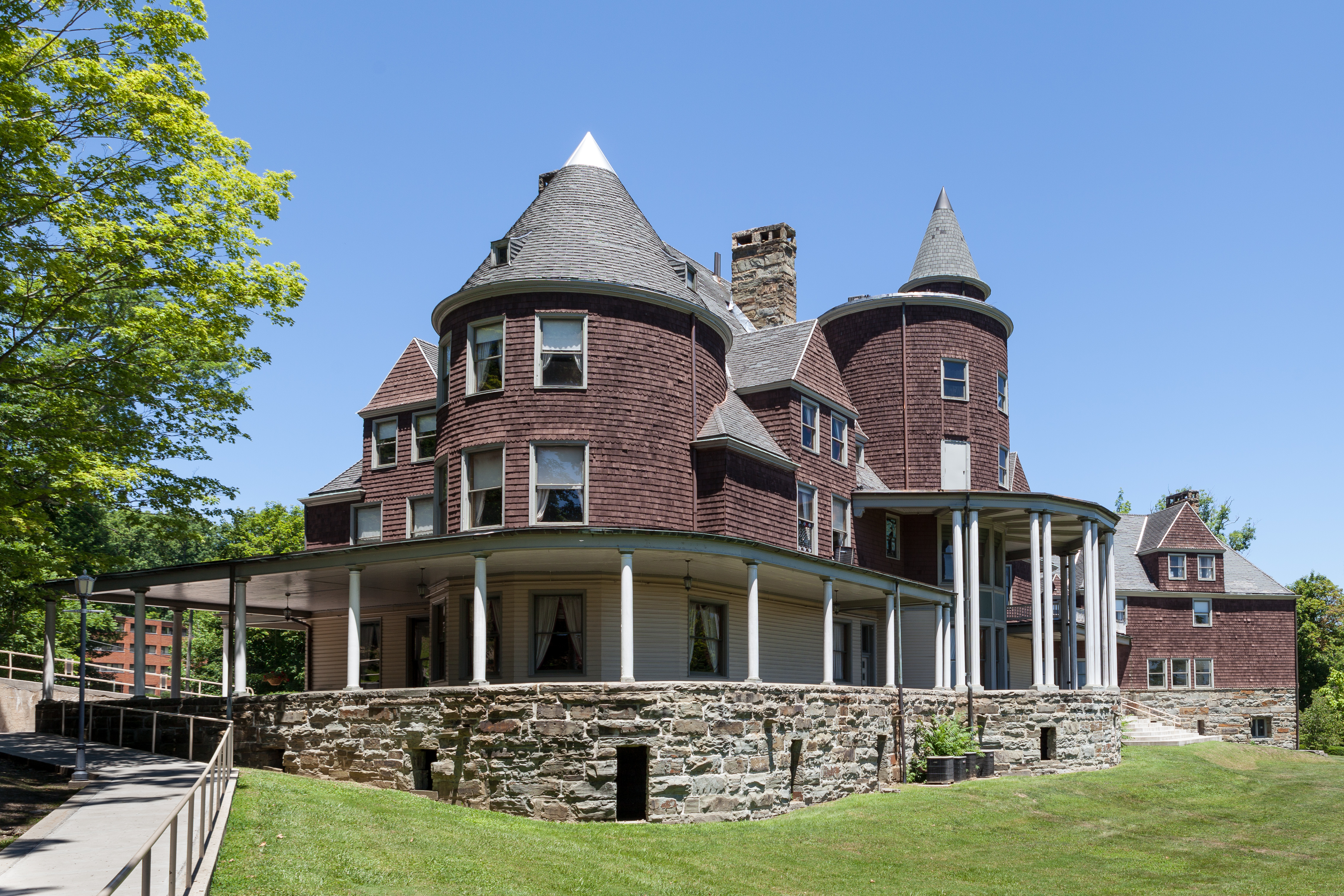
Hallehurst Mansion

Graceland Mansion

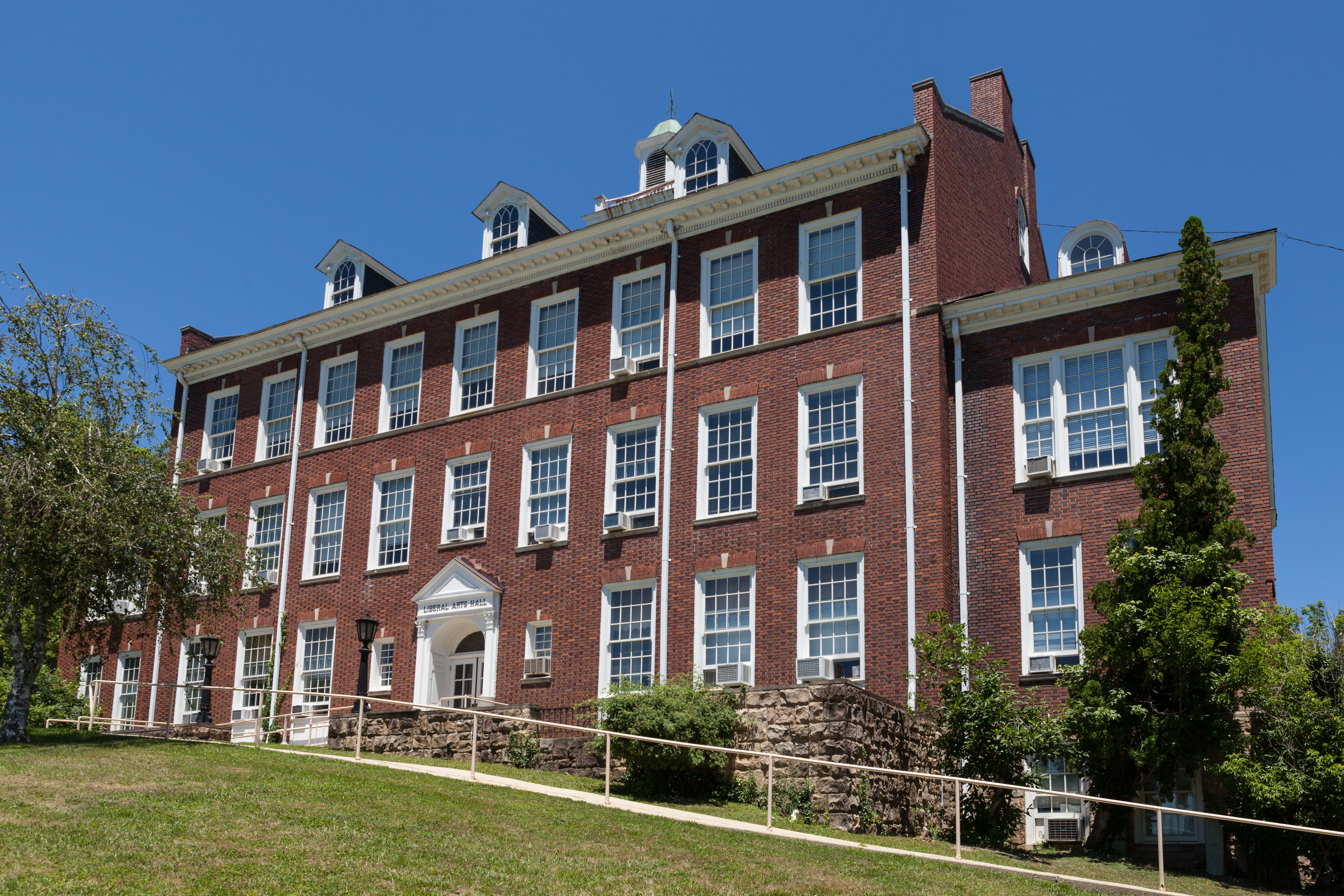
Liberal Arts Hall

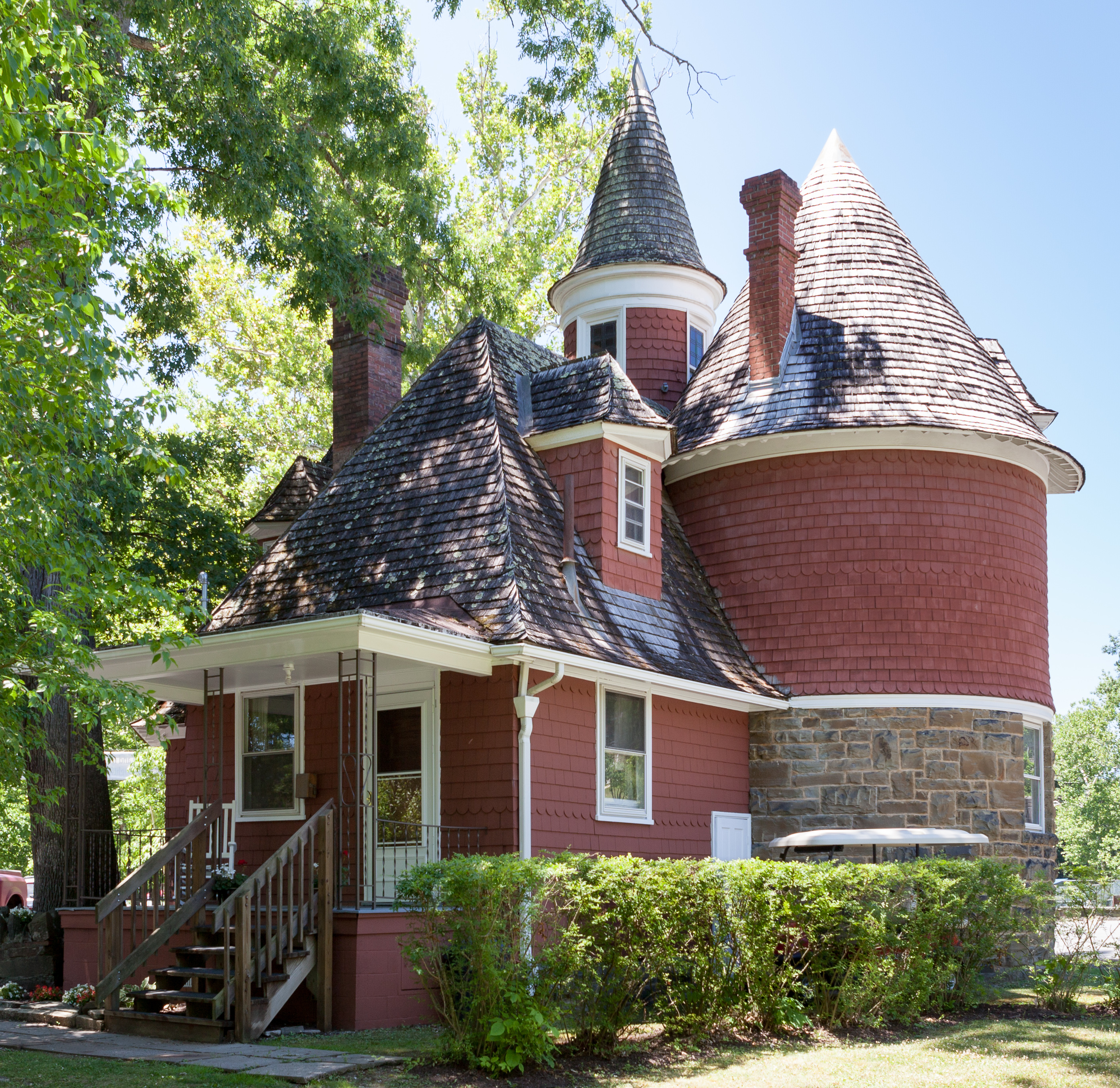
Gate House

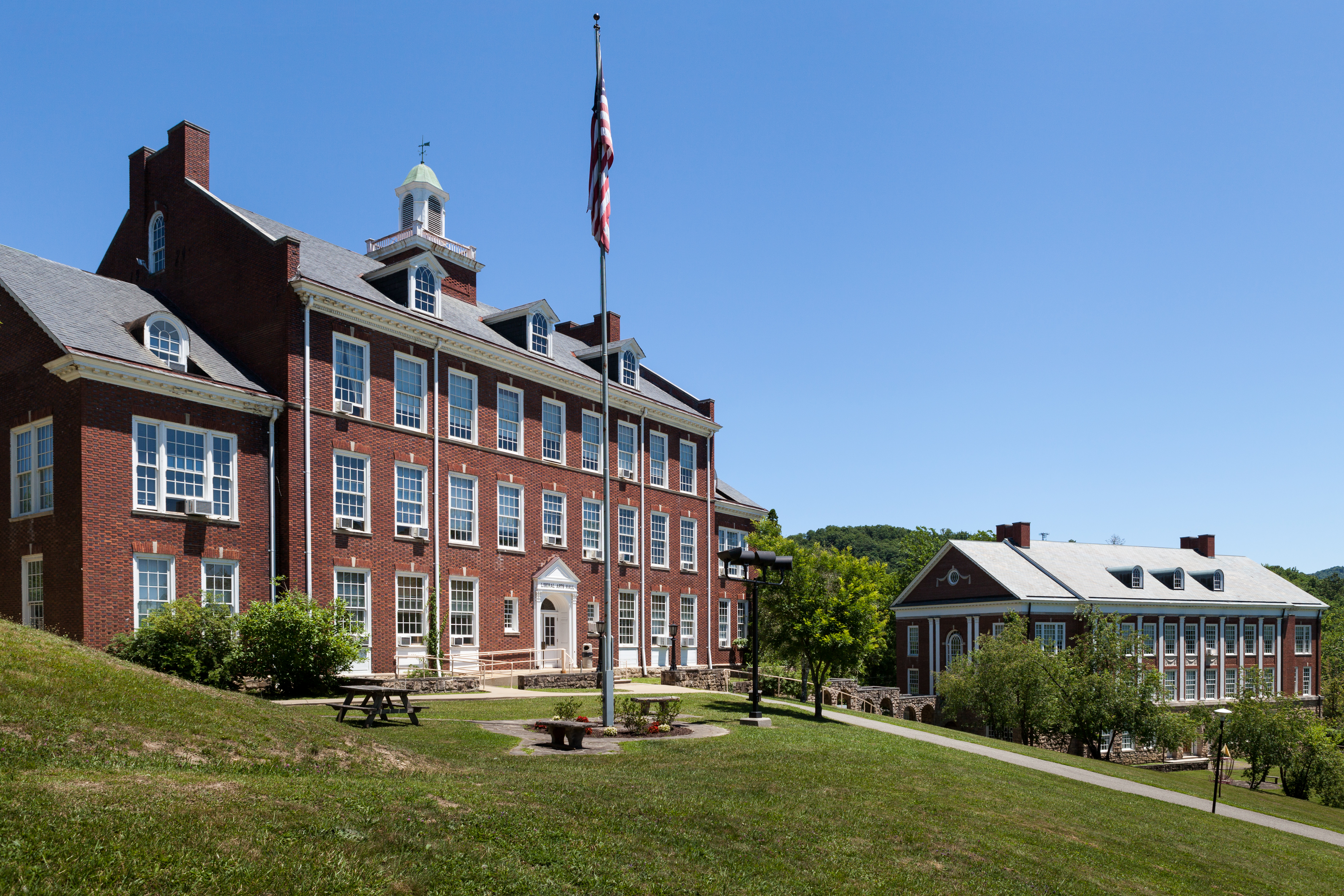
Albert Hall

Robbins Memorial Chapel

1890–1924

- Halliehurst Mansion
- Graceland Mansion
- The Icehouse
- Gatehouse

1925–1976

- Liberal Arts Hall
- Charles E. Albert Hall
- Boiler House Theatre
- Memorial Gymnasium/Martin Field House (dedicated October 2010)
- Jennings Randolph Hall
- Benedum Hall
- Eshleman Science Center
- Walter S. Robbins and Elisabeth Shonk Robbins Memorial Chapel
- Hermanson Center
- Graceland Inn & Robert C. Byrd Center for Hospitality & Tourism
- Darby Hall
- Roxanna Booth Hall
- Gribble Hall
- Presidential Center
- International Hall/Moyer Hall (dedicated October 2010)

1992–present

- Booth Library
- Charles B. Gates Jr. Memorial Tower
- Madden Student Center & William S. Robbins Centennial Tower
- The McDonnell Center for Health, Physical Education and Athletics
- Myles Center for the Arts (dedicated October 2012)
- Glory Residence Hall

== Affiliated programs ==
The Augusta Heritage Center, formerly part of Davis & Elkins College, provides instruction and performances, folklife programs, and a home for significant collections of field recordings, oral histories, photographs, instruments, and Appalachian art.

Augusta Heritage Center is best known for intensive week-long workshops that attract several hundred participants annually. Thousands more attend its public concerts, dances, and festivals. Augusta's full-time staff, plus volunteers, seasonal staff, and work-study students, produce a variety of workshops. These world-renowned workshops and festivals have brought together master artists, musicians, dancers, craftspeople, and enthusiasts of all ages.

As of the summer of 2026, Augusta Heritage Center festivals no longer take place on the campus of Davis & Elkins College.

== Notable alumni ==
- Red Corzine, professional football player
- Glenn Davis, sportscaster
- Jan Eriksson, professional soccer player
- Tex Irvin, professional football player
- Kaia Kater, musician
- Press Maravich, college basketball coach and father of "Pistol" Pete Maravich
- Terry Rooney, college baseball coach (did not graduate)
- Tobi Stoner, professional baseball player
- Cheryl Abplanalp Thompson, Team USA handball player in 1996 Summer Olympics, inductee into Davis and Elkins College Hall of Fame
