= List of people from Parkersburg, West Virginia =

This is a list of people who were born in, lived in, or are closely associated with the city of Parkersburg, West Virginia.

== Athletics ==
- Walt Barnes, professional football player and actor
- Dick Biddle, college football coach
- Zac Boggs, soccer player
- Kim Caldwell, basketball coach
- Chase Fieler, professional basketball player
- Paul Goldsmith, member of Motorcycle Hall of Fame
- Dick Hoblitzel, outfielder in Major League Baseball
- Tom Lopienski, NFL player
- Tim Phillips (swimmer), U.S. National Team and world champion swimmer
- Macguire McDuff, NCAA champion swimmer
- Earle "Greasy" Neale (1891–1973), professional football and baseball player
- Harold Newhart, Olympic gymnast
- Mary Ostrowski, former U.S. National Team gold medalist, West Virginia Sports Hall of Fame
- Brenton Strange, NFL player for the Jacksonville Jaguars
- Nick Swisher, professional baseball player and Steve's son
- Steve Swisher, professional baseball player and Nick's father
- Gibby Welch, professional football player
- Deron Williams, professional basketball player
- CJ Higginbotham, Rower for La Salle University, Winner of the 2024 Head of the Charles Collegiate Eights

== Arts & entertainment ==
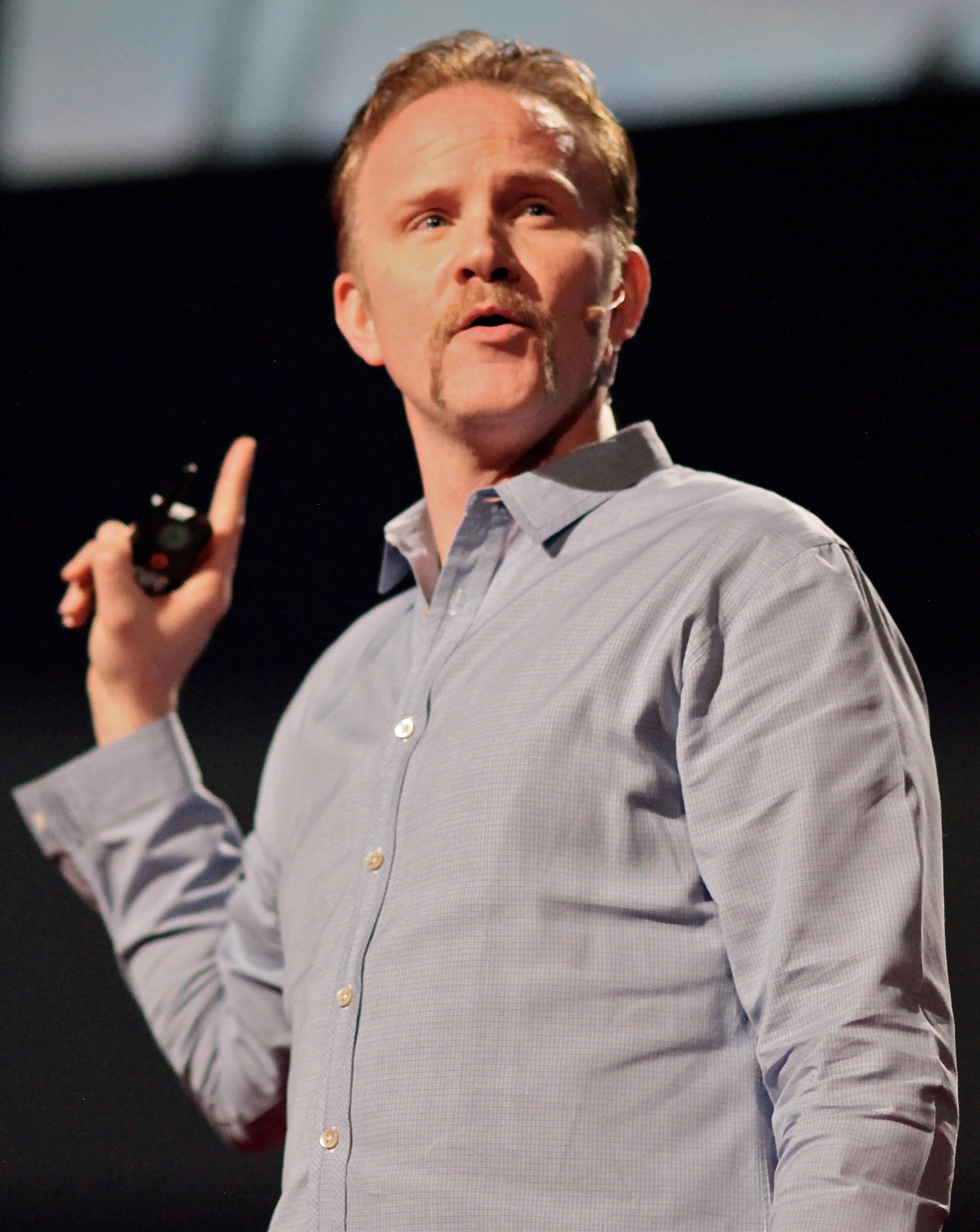
Morgan Spurlock

- Allen Appel, novelist
- Sybil Carmen, Ziegfeld Girl and silent film actress
- Edwin Catmull, president of Walt Disney Animation Studios and Pixar Animation Studios
- Paul Dooley, Hollywood character actor
- Leah Bodine Drake, poet
- Linda Goodman, astrology author
- Tommy Hanlon Jr., Australian television presenter
- Cy Hungerford, political cartoonist for Pittsburgh Post-Gazette
- Lily Irene Jackson (1848–1928), artist and daughter of John Jay Jackson Jr.
- Robert Lichello, author
- Leon Claire Metz, historian, author, documentary personality, lecturer on American West
- Gary Null, nutritionist and author
- Devon Odessa, actress and film producer
- Bill Robinson, jazz singer
- Morgan Spurlock, Academy Award-nominated documentary filmmaker, humorist, television producer, screenwriter, and political activist
- Richard Watts Jr., film critic for New York Herald Tribune and New York Post

== Politics ==
- Edmund Burke Fairfield, 12th lieutenant governor of Michigan and chancellor of University of Nebraska
- Dave Foggin, member of the West Virginia House of Delegates, born in Parkersburg
- John D. Hoblitzell Jr., U.S. senator, born and raised in Parkersburg
- Jacob B. Jackson, governor of West Virginia 1881–85
- Hunter Holmes Moss Jr., Republican U.S. representative
- Buck Rinehart, Republican, mayor of Columbus, Ohio
- Mick Staton, Republican, U.S. representative
- William E. Stevenson, governor of West Virginia, 1869–71
- Peter G. Van Winkle, Republican U.S. senator
- Albert B. White, governor of West Virginia, 1901–05
- Jay Wolfe, West Virginia state senator and U.S. Senate candidate

== Other ==
- Harman Blennerhassett, ally of Aaron Burr and owner of Blennerhassett Island
- Jim Dawson, cultural historian
- Homer A. Holt, justice of West Virginia Supreme Court of Appeals
- John Jay Jackson Jr., U.S. federal judge
- Felix Stump, admiral in U.S. Navy and commander, United States Pacific Fleet

== See also ==
- List of directors and presidents of West Virginia University at Parkersburg
