= Joseph S. Miller =

Commissioner of Internal Revenue

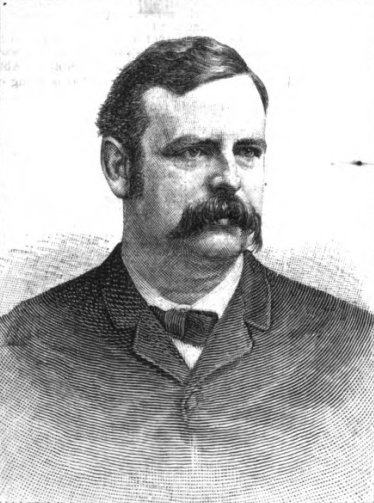
- Frank Leslie's Illustrated Newspaper, March 28, 1885

Commissioner of Internal Revenue
- In office April 19, 1893 – November 26, 1896
- President: Grover Cleveland
- Preceded by: John W. Mason
- Succeeded by: William St. John Forman
- In office March 20, 1885 – March 20, 1889
- President: Grover Cleveland
- Preceded by: Walter Evans
- Succeeded by: John W. Mason

Personal details
- Born: August 18, 1848 Cabell County, Virginia (present day West Virginia)
- Died: February 22, 1921 (aged 72) Huntington, West Virginia
- Party: Democratic

Joseph S. Miller (August 18, 1848 – February 22, 1921) was the eleventh and thirteenth Commissioner of Internal Revenue at the Internal Revenue Service in the United States. His state was West Virginia.

== Early life and education ==
Joseph S. Miller was born on August 18, 1848, in Cabell County, Virginia, now part of West Virginia. Miller was of German descent. Miller received a common school education, and then attended and graduated Beach Grove Academy in Ashland, Kentucky.

== Career ==
Miller served as clerk for the Circuit Court of Cabell County from 1860 to January 1873. Miller served as Clerk of the County Court from 1873 to 1875. Miller served as clerk of the Senate of West Virginia from 1872 to 1876. Miller served as councilman for Barboursville from 1874 to 1875. He later served two terms as West Virginia State Auditor. Initially, Miller ran in the 1884 West Virginia gubernatorial election, but dropped his campaign before the Democratic Convention, and backed the nominee, Emanuel Willis Wilson.

Miller, appointed by President Grover Cleveland, served as IRS Commissioner from March 20, 1885, to March 20, 1889, and from April 19, 1893, to November 26, 1896.

== Personal life ==
Miller was married and had children.

== Death ==
Miller died on February 22, 1921, in a hospital in Huntington, West Virginia.

== See also ==
- Joseph S. Miller House
