= 1892 West Virginia gubernatorial election =

- November 8, 1892
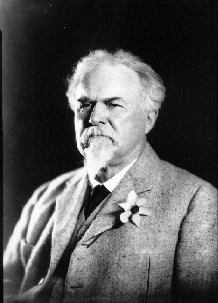

Nominee	William A. MacCorkle	Thomas E. Davis
Party	Democratic	Republican
Popular vote	84,585	80,658
Percentage	49.37%	47.08%
- County results MacCorkle: 50–60% 60–70% 70–80% Davis: 50–60% 60–70% 70–80%
Governor before election
Aretas B. Fleming
Democratic
Elected Governor
William A. MacCorkle
Democratic

The 1892 West Virginia gubernatorial election took place on November 8, 1892, to elect the governor of West Virginia.

Democrat William A. MacCorkle won the election in another close race, though not as close as the one four years earlier.

== Results ==
West Virginia gubernatorial election, 1892
Party	Candidate	Votes	%
Democratic	William A. MacCorkle	84,585	49.37
Republican	Thomas E. Davis	80,658	47.08
Populist	James Bassell	4,037	2.36
Prohibition	Frank Burt	2,039	1.19
Other	Others	5	0.00
Total votes		171,324	100
Democratic hold			
