= Lily Irene Jackson =

American painter

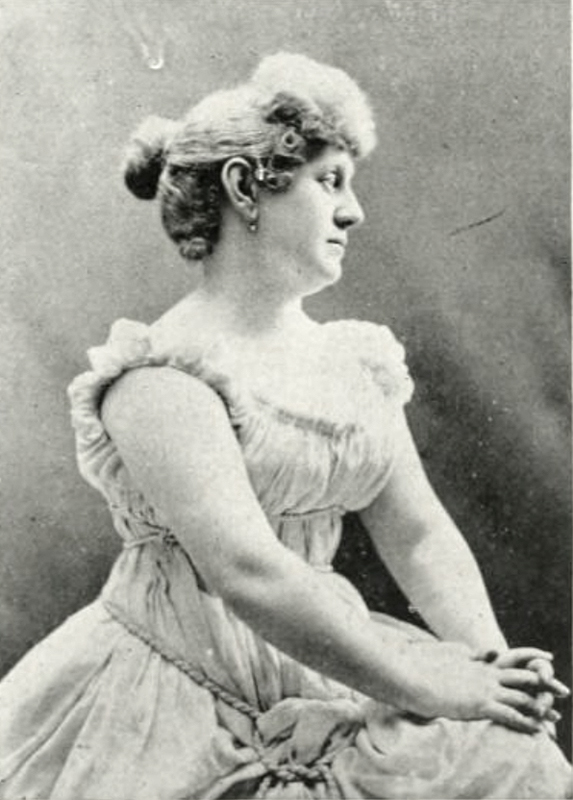
- Jackson, c. 1893
- Born: September 17, 1848; Parkersburg, Virginia, U.S.
- Died: December 9, 1928 (aged 80); Parkersburg, West Virginia, U.S.
- Known for: Painting

Lily Irene Jackson (September 17, 1848 – December 9, 1928), was an American artist and arts organizer active in West Virginia who specialized in paintings of animals.

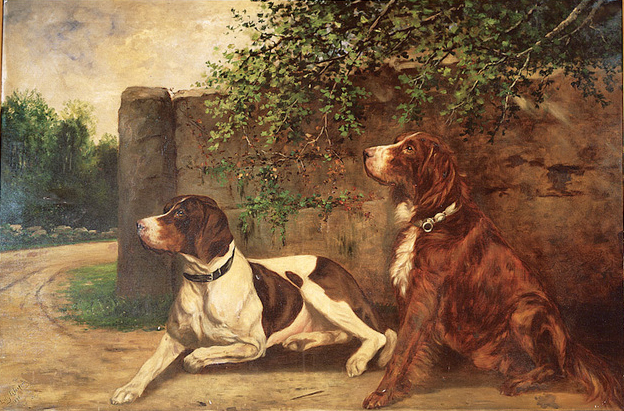
Two Bird Dogs also known as Watching and Waiting by Lily Irene Jackson

== Biography ==
Lily Irene Jackson was born in Parkersburg, West Virginia to Carrie C. Glime Jackson and John Jay Jackson, Jr., an attorney and later a federal judge. She had one sibling, her brother Benjamin. Her uncle Jacob B. Jackson was a governor of West Virginia and another uncle, James Monroe Jackson, was a Congressman. According to a letter written in 1868 by U.S. Chief Justice Salmon P. Chase, Jackson (then 20) was "a little deaf". She lived in the family home, 'Carrinda', her entire life.

Jackson studied art in New York, and both her paintings and her sculpture were praised by critics. She is best known as a painter of animals and as an arts organizer.

In 1887, she organized the Parkersburg Art Society and was elected its first president. In 1892, she organized contributions by West Virginia women to the state’s exhibit at the 1893 Chicago World’s Fair. She exhibited two of her own oil paintings at the fair: Watching and Waiting and Anticipation, both with dogs as subjects. Anticipation featured two then-famous St. Bernard dogs: one owned by actor Sarah Bernhardt, and another from New York that had recently sold for the large sum of $6000 (roughly $150,000 in 2015 dollars). Watching and Waiting, which featured a pair of Jackson's own dogs (a pointer and a setter) hung in the Board Room of the Women's Building at the fair.

In 1917, Jackson published a chapbook of poetry, From One Who Loves You.

Jackson died in Parkersburg in 1928 of diabetic coma.

== Legacy ==
Jackson's work is held by the Blennerhassett Museum of Regional History, the West Virginia State Museum, and other institutions. She was the subject of a 2004 exhibition at the Parkersburg Art Center.
