= Goshorn =

Goshorn is a surname. Notable people with the surname include:

- Alfred T. Goshorn (1833–1902), American businessman and booster
- Belle Goshorn MacCorkle, nee Belle Goshorn (1841–1923), former first lady of West Virginia
- Shan Goshorn (1957–2018), American artist
