= Cornelius Clarkson Watts =

American lawyer and politician

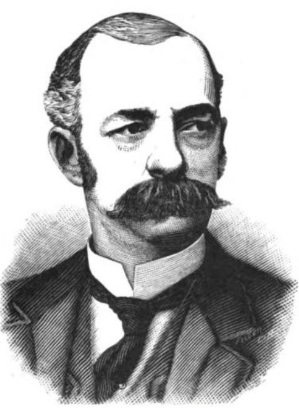
- Watts in 1890

9th Attorney General of West Virginia
- In office 1881–1885
- Governor: Jacob B. Jackson
- Preceded by: Robert White
- Succeeded by: Alfred Caldwell Jr.

Personal details
- Born: April 23, 1848 Amherst, Virginia
- Died: May 28, 1930 (aged 82) Charleston, West Virginia
- Party: Democratic
- Profession: Politician, Attorney

Cornelius Clarkson Watts (1848–1930), or C. C. Watts, was an American lawyer and politician. He served as United States Attorney for the District of West Virginia and Attorney General of West Virginia. In 1896, Watts was the Democratic party candidate for Governor of West Virginia.

== Early and family life ==
He was born April 23, 1848, at Amherst, Virginia. His parents, James D. and Lucy A. (Simms) Watts, lived in Amherst until the beginning of the Civil War, when they removed to Albemarle County, Virginia.

Sixteen year old C.C. Watts joined the Confederate Army and served as a private soldier in Mosby's Command. After the war, he studied law and was educated at the University of Virginia.

== Career ==
In 1870, Watts moved to West Virginia and began the practice of his profession at Oceana, West Virginia. He was elected prosecuting attorney for Wyoming County, West Virginia, in 1872, and held the office until 1875. In that year he moved to Charleston and became a member of the law firm of Kenna & Watts.

He was nominated and elected by the Democratic party, in 1880, as Attorney General for West Virginia, and served his term of four years. While attorney general, he argued many important cases for the State, and with Maj. 0. D. Cook, his faithful assistant, got out nine volumes of Supreme Court reports. He argued the tax case of Chesapeake & Ohio Ry. Co. v. Miller, 114 U.S. 176 (1885) on March 22, 1885, in the Supreme Court of the United States. In that case, he served as Attorney for the State under the employment and appointment of Governor Jacob B. Jackson, after his term of office as Attorney General had expired. In this litigation the State was successful, and besides gaining for itself and the counties through which the road runs, some $200,000, it established the right to forever tax, not only this railway, but all railroads now or hereafter to be built in West Virginia.

In August 1886, President Grover Cleveland sent his name to the United States Senate to be Attorney of the United States for the District of West Virginia. The appointment was confirmed on August 3, 1886, for the term of four years. However, after the election of 1888, which resulted in Mr. Cleveland's defeat, Watts began such a vigorous prosecution of the "Election Fraud Cases," that on March 9, 1889, Attorney General William H. H. Miller, by direction of President Benjamin Harrison, telegraphed U.S.Attorney Watts requesting his resignation. Whereupon he immediately replied by telegram:

Your telegram of this date, by direction of the President, requesting my resignation of the office of United States Attorney for the District of West Virginia, has been received. I know of no act of mine, either official or otherwise, which, in the absence of cause being assigned, would, under existing circumstances, justify me in tendering my resignation. I therefore respectfully decline to make such resignation. If the President wants me to vacate the office of United States Attorney, without cause being assigned therefore, let him assert his prerogative.

On April 4, 1889, he was notified by the President of his removal. In 1891-1894 Watts served as a member of West Virginia State Senate from the 9th District. He was the Democratic party candidate for Governor of West Virginia in 1896, defeated by Republican party candidate George W. Atkinson.

== Death and legacy ==
He died in Charleston on May 28, 1930, and was interred at Spring Hill Cemetery, Charleston. His home, Breezemont, was listed on the National Register of Historic Places in 1982.

== Sources ==
- Google books reference George Wesley Atkinson and Alvaro Franklin Gibbens, Prominent Men of West Virginia (Wheeling, W. Va.: W. L. Callin, 1890) p. 812-813.
- The Political Graveyard: Index to Politicians: Watts

Party political offices
Preceded by William A. MacCorkle	Democratic nominee for Governor of West Virginia; 1896	Succeeded by John H. Holt
Legal offices
Preceded by Robert White	Attorney General of West Virginia; 1881–1885	Succeeded by Alfred Caldwell Jr.
