= Emanuel Wilson =

Emanuel Wilson may refer to:

- Emanuel Willis Wilson (1844–1905), American politician
- Emanuel Wilson (American football) (born 1999), American football running back
