= Parkersburg High School =

The Parkersburg High School

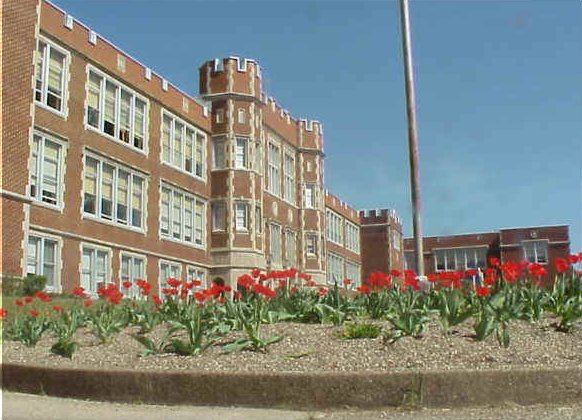

Location
- 2101 Dudley Ave. Parkersburg, West Virginia 26101; United States; 39°16′43″N 81°32′41″W

Information
- Type: Public
- Motto: The School of Champions
- Established: 1867; 159 years ago
- School district: Wood County Schools
- Principal: Jason Potts
- Grades: 9-12
- Gender: Co-educational
- Enrollment: approx. 1 550 (2023-2024)
- Campus type: Urban
- Colors: Red; White
- Fight song: 1. "It's PHS Boys"; 2. "The Red and White of Parkersburg High"
- Athletics conference: Mountain State Athletic Conference
- Mascot: The Big Red Indian
- Nickname: Big Reds
- Website: www.woodcountyschoolswv.com/o/ph

Parkersburg High School (PHS) is a public secondary school located on Dudley Avenue in Parkersburg in West Virginia, United States. Founded in 1867, it serves grades nine through twelve. As of 2024, the school had approximately 1 600 students enrolled.

== History ==
Parkersburg High School was one of the first high schools in the state of West Virginia. The school was founded in 1867, originally located in downtown Parkersburg. The current building housing PHS has a Tudor Style architecture with three stories. It was designed by noted Ohio architect Frank Packard (1866–1923), and built in 1917. It remains the largest high school campus in the state. Later additions included Stadium Field and the Field House, a multi-story gymnasium. It is located in the Parkersburg High School-Washington Avenue Historic District, listed on the National Register of Historic Places in 1992.

PHS continued to serve as the only high school in Parkersburg, at one point holding a population of around three thousand students. It was only after graduating a class of eleven hundred thirty seven (1137) students in 1965 that a second public school, Parkersburg South High School, was founded in 1967. This in turn started a rivalry between the two schools that continues to be one of the largest and most famous in the state of West Virginia.

When the current high school campus opened in 1917, the former high school building was re-established as Washington Junior High School. Previously, Washington Junior High School fed PHS as well. The Washington Junior High School building was demolished in 1964. Washington Junior High then opened in the former Jefferson Elementary School on Plum Street, adjacent to a newly built Jefferson Elementary School. Washington Junior High closed in 1992, combining with Jefferson Elementary School to become an elementary center in 1998.

Planetarium

A planetarium was constructed in the 1960s through the joint efforts of the Rotary Club of Parkersburg, Corning Glass Works, the National Defense Education Act (NDEA) and the Wood County Board of Education. Cost for constructing the room and purchasing equipment was $32,770.00. It is one of the first high schools in America to have a planetarium.

Data processing center

During the 1965–66 school year, PHS became one of the first high schools in the United States to offer students classes in data processing and computer programming in the "new" and expanding technology. The Burroughs computer required a huge, temperature controlled room of its own, and had a memory capacity of 640 Kb—considered top-of-the-line then. It used six phone booth-sized magnetic tape readers for computations. in 1967, upon completion of the second high school, the computer center was re-located to the new building.

== Governance ==
The school is part of the Wood County Schools. DuPont is its partner in education.

The feeder schools contributing to this student population are Jackson Middle School, Hamilton Middle School and Van Devender Middle School, which is set to close in 2025.

== School song ==
The alma mater of PHS is set to the tune of the song "Spanish Chant", also known as the "Spanish Hymn". This is the same song used by Ohio State University for their alma mater, and is known there as "Carmen Ohio". The PHS alma mater pre-dates Ohio State's.

== Sport and extracurricular activities ==
The nickname "Big Reds" came to PHS in 1915 with the arrival of Ralph Jones, who came from Denison University. The Big Reds of Denison school colors are red and white. The name was adopted by Parkersburg, as were the school colors. The mascot of PHS is the Big Red Indian, adopted in 1961. The school's main rivalry is with its cross-town counterpart, Parkersburg South High School, with both schools competing in the Mountain State Athletic Conference.

PHS was rated by Sports Illustrated as the #9 sports high school of all time.

During the summer of 2008, due to the successes of the school's sports programs, the town of Parkersburg was featured on ESPN as a candidate for TitleTown USA. Parkersburg came in as the runner-up in the Titletown voting process, losing to Valdosta, Georgia.

=== American football ===
The football team has the 13th most victories in the United States, with 857 (as of 5/12/2025). For the first time in 103 years of PHS football, 2007 marked the first time the team won back to back state championships (2006 and 2007).

=== Soccer ===
The boys' and girls' soccer teams were also 2006 state champions, with the boys' team having won two in a row, making for a state record four state championship wins for one high school. The boys' team is also currently ranked 24th in the nation.

=== Other sports ===
The PHS boys' tennis team has 21 titles, the record for the most titles for one team in West Virginia. The Parkersburg High School wrestling team won the 2006-07 and 2007-08 AAA State Championship. Other sports undertaken at the school include athletics, golf, volleyball, basketball and swimming.

=== Honors ===
As of November 2022, Parkersburg High School has a total of 147 West Virginia high school state championships.

	State championships
Sport	Year(s)
Boys' cross country
Girls' cross country	1982, 1994 (AAA), 1995 (AAA), 2000 (AAA)
Football	1911, 1918, 1919, 1921, 1922, 1927, 1938, 1940, 1943, 1950 (A), 1958 (AAA), 1976 (AAA), 1978 (AAA), 1999 (AAA), 2001 (AAA), 2006 (AAA), 2007 (AAA)
Cheerleading
Golf	1957, 1961, 1962, 1969, 1970, 1972, 1974, 1975, 1983-spring, 1986, 1987
Volleyball	1980, 1991, 1992 (AAA), 1993 (AAA), 1994 (AAA), 1995 (AAA), 1998 (AAA), 1999 (AAA), 2000 (AAA), 2004 (AAA), 2007 (AAA)
Boys' soccer	1996, 1997, 2005, 2006, 2008 (AAA), 2009 (AAA)
Girls' soccer	2006
Boys' basketball	1916, 1917, 1923 (A), 1932, 1958 (A), 1960 (AAA), 1970 (AAA)
Girls' basketball	1988 (AAA), 1989 (AAA), 1991 (AAA), 1994 (AAA), 1996 (AAA), 2018 (AAA), 2019 (AAA), 2025 (AAAA)
Wrestling	1948, 1950, 1951, 1955, 1957, 1958, 1959, 1962, 1965, 1970, 1971, 1982 (AAA), 1988 (AAA), 1989 (AAA), 1992 (AAA), 1993 (AAA), 1994 (AAA), 2003 (AAA), 2004 (AAA), 2007 (AAA), 2008 (AAA)
Boys' swimming
Girls' swimming	2002, 2018, 2019
Baseball	1946, 1954, 1971
Boys' tennis	1967, 1969, 1970, 1971, 1972, 1976, 1977, 1978, 1979, 1980, 1981, 1982, 1983, 1984, 1985, 1989, 1990, 1991, 2001 (AAA), 2002 (AAA), 2003 (AAA)
Girls' tennis	1970, 1972, 1974, 1975, 1976, 1981, 1982, 1983, 1984, 1985, 1986, 1987, 1991, 2002 (AAA), 2005 (AAA), 2008 (AAA), 2010 (AAA)
Boys' track	1922, 1923, 1928, 1932, 1965 (AAA), 2014 (AAA), 2021 (AAA)
Girls' track	1976, 1977, 1983 (AAA), 1984 (AAA), 1986 (AAA), 1992 (AAA), 1993 (AAA), 1996 (AAA), 1997 (AAA), 1998 (AAA), 2001 (AAA)

=== Drama ===
The Parkersburg High School drama program is split between the PHS Drama Club and Thespian Troupe #264, which work together to produce plays as the combined "PHS Players." Drama Club members work towards earning enough Thespian "points" in order to be inducted into the troupe at a ceremony which takes place at the end of each school year.

In 1971, Thespian Troupe #264 won best play for both the regional and state drama festival for Comings and Goings. In 2009, Thespian Troupe #264 placed in the top five schools at the West Virginia Thespian Festival in the one-act play competition against thirteen other schools statewide for their performance of Bradley Hayward's Imaginary Harry. PHS Thespians were awarded a $10,000 grant towards representing West Virginia at the International Thespian Festival in Lincoln, Nebraska in June 2009 making them State Champions. The troupe were named one of the Top Five one-acts at the International Festival.

=== Dance ===
The dance program at PHS consists of students taking dance classes for arts credits.

=== Forensics ===
The Parkersburg High School Forensics Team consists of a Speech team and Debate team. Both teams travel and compete together around the state and at a "home" Tournament dubbed the Isenhart Invitational in Spring. The Forensics Team sponsors various fundraisers including the Mister and Miss PHS Pageants held in April.

In 2008, three competitors from the PHS Speech Team won at the state level in their respective "events" (Original Oratory and Duo Interpretation) and a bid to compete at the Grand National Tournament in Appleton, Wisconsin but did not "octofinal" or go on to place nationally. In 2009, Parkersburg High School was awarded third place overall at the State Tournament behind Wheeling Park High School and Huntington High School. In 2010, Parkersburg High School was awarded third place overall at the State Tournament. In 2017, six of the school's students qualified at the state level and went on to compete in the Catholic League Grand National Tournament in Louisville, Kentucky.

=== Music ===
PHS is home to many musical ensembles. The most recognizable ensemble is the Parkersburg Big Red Band. Alongside there is also a percussion ensemble, jazz ensemble, chamber choir, men's ensemble and women's ensemble.

==== Choral music ====
Formed in 1931, the A Cappella Choir, is best known in the school for its annual Christmas Concert. The first a cappella choir in West Virginia, it was started by Marie Boette, after she sent some of her students to Detroit to a singing competition. Throughout the years, the choir has performed for two US presidents: Harry S Truman in 1949 and Lyndon B Johnson in 1966 and also performed in Carnegie Hall alongside OSU's choir and a few other high school and college choirs in 2010. In addition, the choir performed in Washington, D.C. in 1999 and was selected as an honor ensemble for the 2000, 2002, 2005, 2018, and 2023 West Virginia Music Education Association annual conferences.

The Chamber Choir sang at three professional basketball games in 2004, 2005 and again in 2006. In addition, they were with Parkersburg South's Chamber Choir and West Virginia University at Parkersburg's chorus in premiering "The Unknown Region" by Kenton Cole. Most recently, the Chamber Choir was selected to sing during the 2019 White House Christmas Open Houses.

Due to the 2008 grade shift in Wood County Schools, a new choral organization was formed for 9th graders who were not inducted into the A Cappella Choir called the Freshman Choir. In its first year, there were over eighty members in this organization.

==== Instrumental music ====
The Big Red Band was first a concert band only organized in 1919. The first Big Red Band as a marching band was in 1924. It was all-male, and women were not allowed into the band itself until 1970. The Big Red Band is the only military-style marching band in the state of West Virginia.

The original uniforms for the band were all white with red trim and buttoned down the middle. They featured red capes and red navy-style dress uniform hats (similar to the ones worn by the Navy ROTC at PHS). The current uniforms have been essentially the same since at least 1955, with the only noticeable change being the crossbelts. Originally they were just one sash crossing over the body; the current ones have two sashes (which in 1955 were worn by the field commanders) that criss-cross the band member with the right one over the left one. The uniform top has two sets of silver buttons, one for each side, and the uniform pants have a red stripe down each outward facing side. The field commander's uniform has seen its share of changes also. Originally, there were multiple field commanders/drum majors. One wore an all red uniform with the same styled white hat, and the others wore the white uniforms that eventually became the current field commander's uniform. The current field commander uniform was all white with a tall white hat with the 1955 set, this was changed slightly to include a red breastpiece and yellow shoulderpieces. The crossbelts worn by them in 1955 became the current crossbelts for the band. The field commander uniform lacks a crossbelt.

The Big Red Band has its own fair share of recognition, performing at the World's Fair in 1982. They were also in the Macy's Thanksgiving Day Parade in November 1992. They also performed in the Kentucky Derby Pegasus Parade in 1995, and are regularly invited to participate in New Year's Day "bowl festivities."

Also, the Big Red Band won two Veterans of Foreign Wars junior band championships, one in Boston (1955) and one in Dallas (1956) and are one of only a few groups at PHS to be able to call themselves national champions. The band also won the Lion's Club International Band Contest four times: in Providence (year unknown), Chicago (1937), Pittsburgh (1939), and New Orleans (1941). They performed for the National Moose Convention in 1948. In addition, they were selected as the best band in the state in 1930 and won the tri-state band concert in 1933. The band received the Ohio State Governor's Cup in the fall of 1991.

The concert and jazz band traveled to New Orleans for the Heritage Festival national competition in the 2004–2005 school year. The jazz band ended up taking 2nd place nationally and the concert band 1st place.

The band performed for Ronald Reagan and George W. Bush during their visits to Parkersburg as presidents of the United States. They also played for Queen Marie of Romania during an incidental visit to Parkersburg (this was due to a snow squall hitting the area, forcing the queen's train to stop) in 1926.

== Notable alumni ==
=== Sport ===
- Len Barnum, NFL player
- Dick Biddle, college football coach
- Zak Boggs, professional soccer player
- Bill Earley (class of 1938), assistant head coach at Notre Dame, 1946–1954
- Greasy Neale, football coach
- Brenton Strange (class of 2019), TE Jacksonville Jaguars, drafted in 2023
- Nick Swisher (class of 1999), former Major League Baseball Player (World Series Champion with the New York Yankees in 2009)
- Gibby Welch, football player

=== Arts and media ===
- Doug Marks, founder of Metal Method guitar instruction
- Leon Claire Metz (class of 1948), journalist and cultural historian

=== Politics and law ===
- Joseph Albright (class of 1956), West Virginia supreme court justice
- Mick Staton (class of 1958), West Virginia Republican politician
- Glen Gainer, Jr. (class of 1945), State Auditor of West Virginia, 1977–1993

=== Other ===
- Stephen D. Barnett (Class of 1985), rear admiral in U.S. Navy, commander of the Navy Region of Hawaii
- Linda Goodman (class of 1943), astrologer
- Patsy Ramsey (class of 1975), Miss West Virginia 1977, mother of JonBenét Ramsey

== Notable staff ==
- Ben Schwartzwalder, Big Reds coach, 1936–40

== See also ==
- List of high schools in West Virginia
