= 1896 West Virginia gubernatorial election =

- November 3, 1896
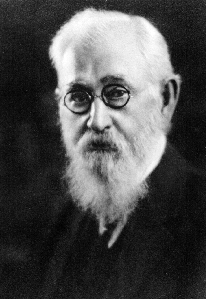

Nominee	George W. Atkinson	Cornelius Clarkson Watts
Party	Republican	Democratic
Popular vote	105,588	93,558
Percentage	52.41%	46.44%
- County results Atkinson: 40–50% 50–60% 60–70% 70–80% Watts: 50–60% 60–70% 70–80%
Governor before election
William A. MacCorkle
Democratic
Elected Governor
George W. Atkinson
Republican

The 1896 West Virginia gubernatorial election took place on November 3, 1896, to elect the governor of West Virginia.

== Results ==
West Virginia gubernatorial election, 1896
Party	Candidate	Votes	%
Republican	George W. Atkinson	105,588	52.41
Democratic	Cornelius Clarkson Watts	93,558	46.44
Prohibition	T. C. Johnson	1,345	0.67
Populist	N. W. Fitzgerald	813	0.40
Other	Others	168	0.08
Total votes		201,472	100.00
Republican gain from Democratic			
