= William Brockenbrough =

William Brockenbrough may refer to:

- William Henry Brockenbrough (1812–1850), U.S. Representative from Florida
- William Brockenbrough (judge) (1778–1838), Virginia lawyer, political figure and judge
