= John White Brockenbrough =

American judge

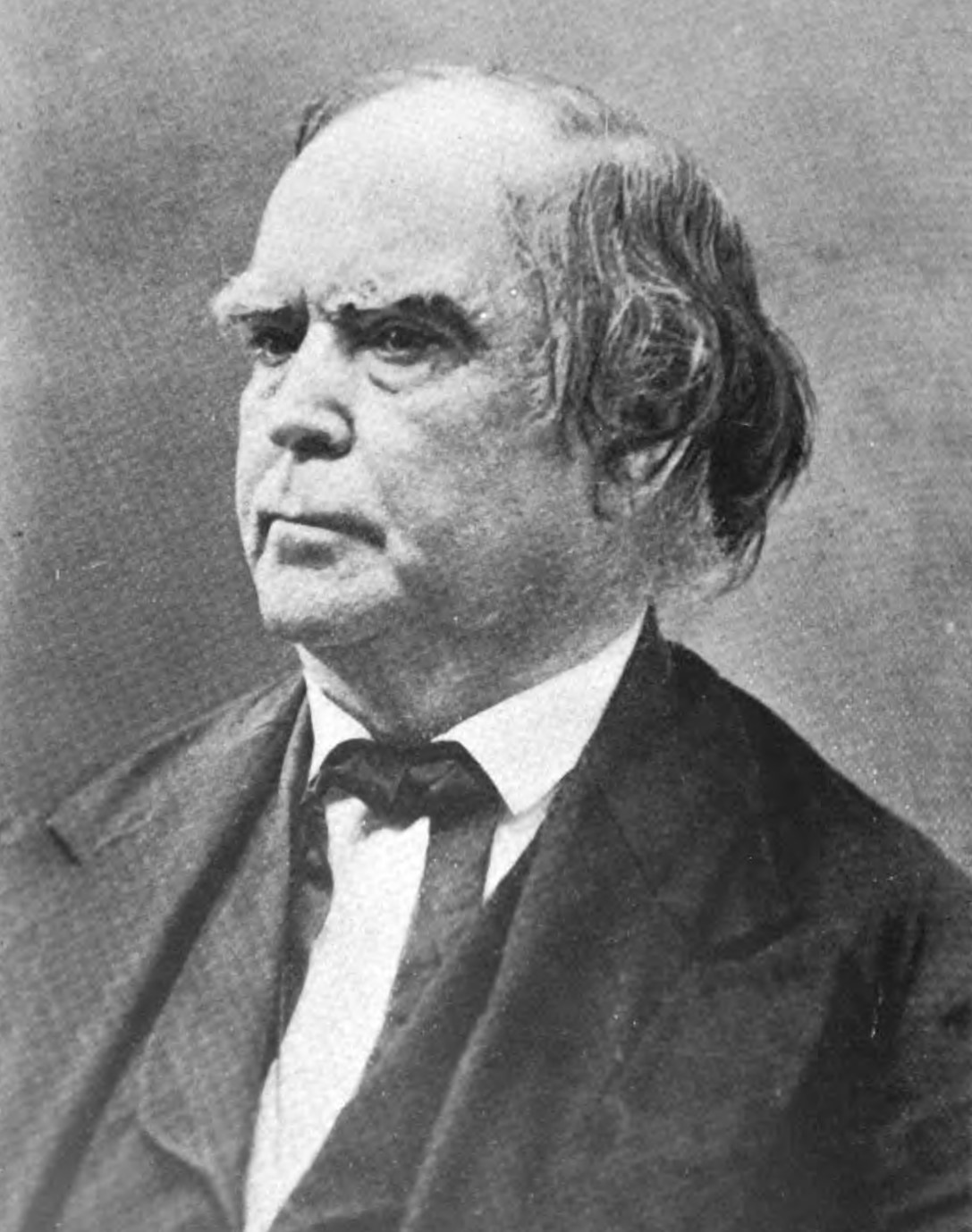

Judge of the United States District Court for the Western District of Virginia
- In office January 14, 1846 – May 4, 1861
- Appointed by: James K. Polk
- Preceded by: Isaac S. Pennybacker
- Succeeded by: John Jay Jackson Jr.

Personal details
- Born: John White Brockenbrough; December 23, 1806 Hanover County, Virginia
- Died: February 20, 1877 (aged 70) Lexington, Virginia
- Parents: William Brockenbrough (father); Judith Brockenbrough (mother)
- Relatives: William Henry Brockenbrough
- Education: College of William & Mary; Winchester Law School

John White Brockenbrough (December 23, 1806 – February 20, 1877) was a Virginia attorney, law professor, U.S. District Judge of the United States District Court for the Western District of Virginia, and Confederate States congressman and district judge.

== Early life and education ==
Born on December 23, 1806, in Hanover County, Virginia to Judith and William Brockenbrough, both descended from the First Families of Virginia. Brockenbrough attended He attended the College of William & Mary from 1824-1825. He then traveled to the Winchester Law School, in Winchester, Virginia, studying under Henry St. George Tucker Sr. Others studying with Tucker at that time included William L. Goggin and Henry A. Wise. His sister Judith White Brockenbrough McGuire would later write Diary of a Southern Refugee, During the War, By a Lady of Virginia. He was a first cousin of William Henry Brockenbrough.

== Career ==
Brockenbrough was admitted to the Virginia bar and began a private practice in Hanover County until 1834. He served as a commonwealth's attorney for Hanover County. He continued private practice in Rockbridge County, Virginia starting in 1834. He was editor of the Lexington Valley Star in Rockbridge County. In 1837, he published two volumes of reports, containing the decisions of John Marshall's federal circuit court opinions.

== Federal judicial service ==
Brockenbrough was nominated by President James K. Polk on December 23, 1845, to a seat on the United States District Court for the Western District of Virginia vacated by Judge Isaac S. Pennybacker. He was confirmed by the United States Senate on January 14, 1846, and received his commission the same day. His service terminated on May 4, 1861, due to his resignation. He was succeeded by Judge John Jay Jackson Jr.

=== Other service ===
Concurrent with his federal judicial service, Brockenbrough was the founder and a Professor of law for Lexington Law School (now the Washington and Lee University School of Law) in Lexington, Virginia from 1849 to 1861. His law students included John J. Davis, John Goode and Robert Murphy Mayo. In his introductory address to the first class of incoming students, Brockenbrough offered this advice:

Sooner or later the occasion will arise when you will appear before the dread tribunal of the public. Let us suppose that the time for the trial of your strength has now arrived. You are called to participate in the management of a cause which excites a profound public interest. A natural curiosity is felt to hear the maiden speech of the young lawyer! People have scarcely yet learned to look upon you as a man. Little is therefore expected of you, but you have had time for preparation, and you have used it well. You have anticipated every possible phase which the case can assume, and you are ready with your authorities to sustain all your positions. The eager crowd closes around you. They listen with surprised delight at the display of your learning and ingenuity, now enraptured with your splendid bursts of indignant eloquence, now melted into pity by some master stroke of touching pathos. With what a greedy ear they drink in those "words that burn, those thoughts that breathe!" You sit down overpowered by your own emotion. An audible murmer of approbation runs through that delighted throng! The cause is ended, the victory is won! Clients now pour in upon you, who before had none. You have made a great impression. Your reputation is now established on a firm basis, and the voice of hissing envy shall not retard your onward march. My friends, this is no fancy sketch. We are told by Mr. Butler in his "Reminiscences," that a celebrated English lawyer of the last century had said, that so sudden was his rise at the Bar, that he never knew the difference between having no income at all, and one of £3,000 sterling a year. A single great speech had established his reputation on an imperishable foundation. Who shall say that a like brilliant destiny may not be reserved for some of you, in the unwritten history of the future?

In 1852, Brockenbrough was elected to the board of trustees of what is now Washington and Lee University (then Washington College), which had previously honored him with a Doctor of Laws degree in 1851.

=== Peace conference ===
Along with John Tyler, William C. Rives, James Seddon, and George W. Summers, Brockenbrough represented Virginia at the peace conference of 1861.

=== Civil War ===
Following his resignation from the federal bench, Brockenbrough became one of Virginia's delegates to the Provisional Congress of the Confederate States from 1861 to 1862. He was a Judge of the Confederate District Court for the Western District of Virginia starting in 1862.

== Postwar teaching career ==
Brockenbrought was a Professor of law for the Washington College Law School (now the Washington and Lee University School of Law) in Lexington from 1866 to 1873. As Rector of Washington College from 1865 to 1872, he was the one to approach Robert E. Lee with the trustees' proposal to make Lee President of the College. In 1866, Lee as President of Washington College invited Brockenbrough to merge his Lexington Law School with Washington College, and continue to teach as Professor of Law and Equity. In 1870, John Randolph Tucker, son of Henry St. George Tucker Sr., was hired to teach law along with Brockenbrough. In 1868, Brockenbrough was a member of a five-man committee in Lexington which called for "a White Man's party, based on the single principal [sic] that the white man alone has the right to vote." Brockenbrough resigned in 1873, in a dispute over salary. He resumed private practice in Lexington from 1873 to 1877.

== Personal life ==
Brockenbrough married Mary C. Bowyer of Lexington, Virginia and they had children.

== Death and legacy ==
Brockenbrough died on February 20, 1877, in Lexington.

== Sources ==
- "A Judge’s School: The Story of John White Brockenbrough," Matthew W. Paxton Jr., Rockbridge Epilogues, https://historicrockbridge.org/spreads/28_paxton_brockenbrough.pdf
- Judge John White Brockenbrough Founder of Washington and Lee Law School
- Hon. Armistead M. Dobie, "Federal District Judges in Virginia before the Civil War," 12 F.R.D. 451 (1951,1952) (viewed on Westlaw)

Legal offices
Preceded by Isaac S. Pennybacker	Judge of the United States District Court for the Western District of Virginia; 1846–1861	Succeeded by John Jay Jackson Jr.
