= Lawrence Weldon =

American judge (1829–1905)

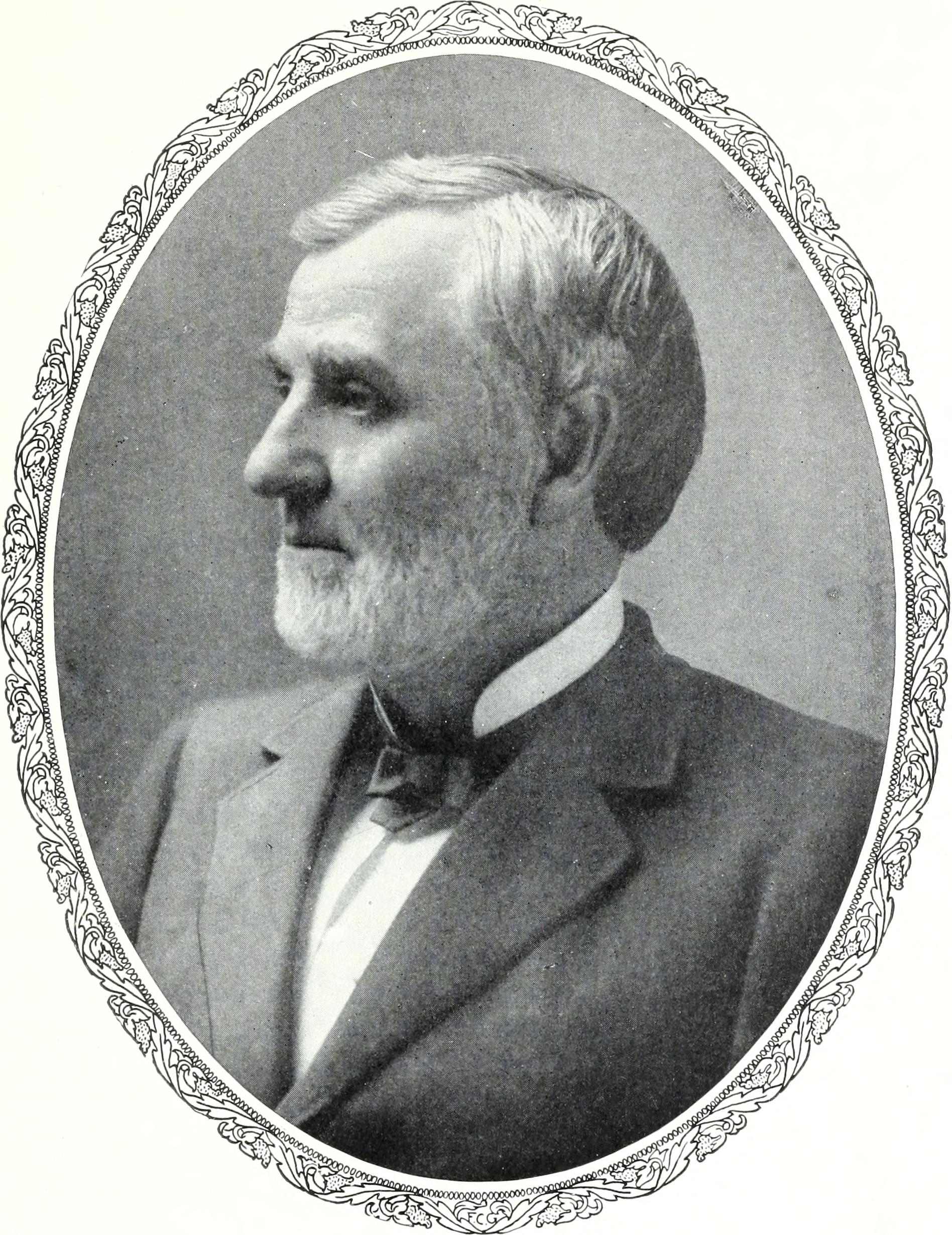
- From the book Lincoln the Lawyer

Judge of the Court of Claims
- In office November 24, 1883 – April 10, 1905
- Appointed by: Chester A. Arthur
- Preceded by: Bancroft Davis
- Succeeded by: George W. Atkinson

Personal details
- Born: Lawrence Weldon; August 9, 1829 Zanesville, Ohio, U.S.
- Died: April 10, 1905 (aged 75) Washington, D.C., U.S.
- Education: Wittenberg College read law

Lawrence Weldon (August 9, 1829 – April 10, 1905) was an Illinois attorney and politician and a judge of the Court of Claims.

== Education and career ==
Born on August 9, 1829, in Zanesville, Ohio, Weldon attended the public schools and Wittenberg College in Springfield, Ohio. He served as clerk for the Secretary of State of Ohio from 1853 to 1854. He read law while working for Judge Richard A. Harrison and was admitted to the Ohio bar in 1854. He entered private practice in Clinton, Illinois from 1854 to 1861. During this time he became acquainted with Stephen A. Douglas, who introduced him to Abraham Lincoln. He was a member of the Illinois House of Representatives in 1861. He was appointed United States Attorney for the Southern District of Illinois by President Abraham Lincoln, serving from 1861 to 1866. He resumed private practice in Bloomington, Illinois from 1867 to 1883.

== Federal judicial service ==
Weldon received a recess appointment from President Chester A. Arthur on November 24, 1883, to a seat on the Court of Claims (later the United States Court of Claims) vacated by Judge Bancroft Davis. He was nominated to the same position by President Arthur on December 12, 1883. He was confirmed by the United States Senate on December 18, 1883, and received his commission the same day. His service terminated on April 10, 1905, due to his death in Washington, D.C. He was succeeded by Judge George W. Atkinson.

== Personal life ==
In December 1854, Weldon wed Mary Jane Howard, and had two children.

== Sources ==
- Federal Judicial Center entry on Lawrence Weldon
- The United States Court of Claims : a history / pt. 1. The judges, 1855-1976 / by Marion T. Bennett / pt. 2. Origin, development, jurisdiction, 1855-1978 / W. Cowen, P. Nichols, M.T. Bennett. Washington, D.C.: Committee on the Bicentennial of Independence and the Constitution of the Judicial Conference of the United States. 1976.

Legal offices
Preceded by Bancroft Davis	Judge of the Court of Claims; 1883–1905	Succeeded by George W. Atkinson
