= John W. Mason =

American judge (1842–1917)

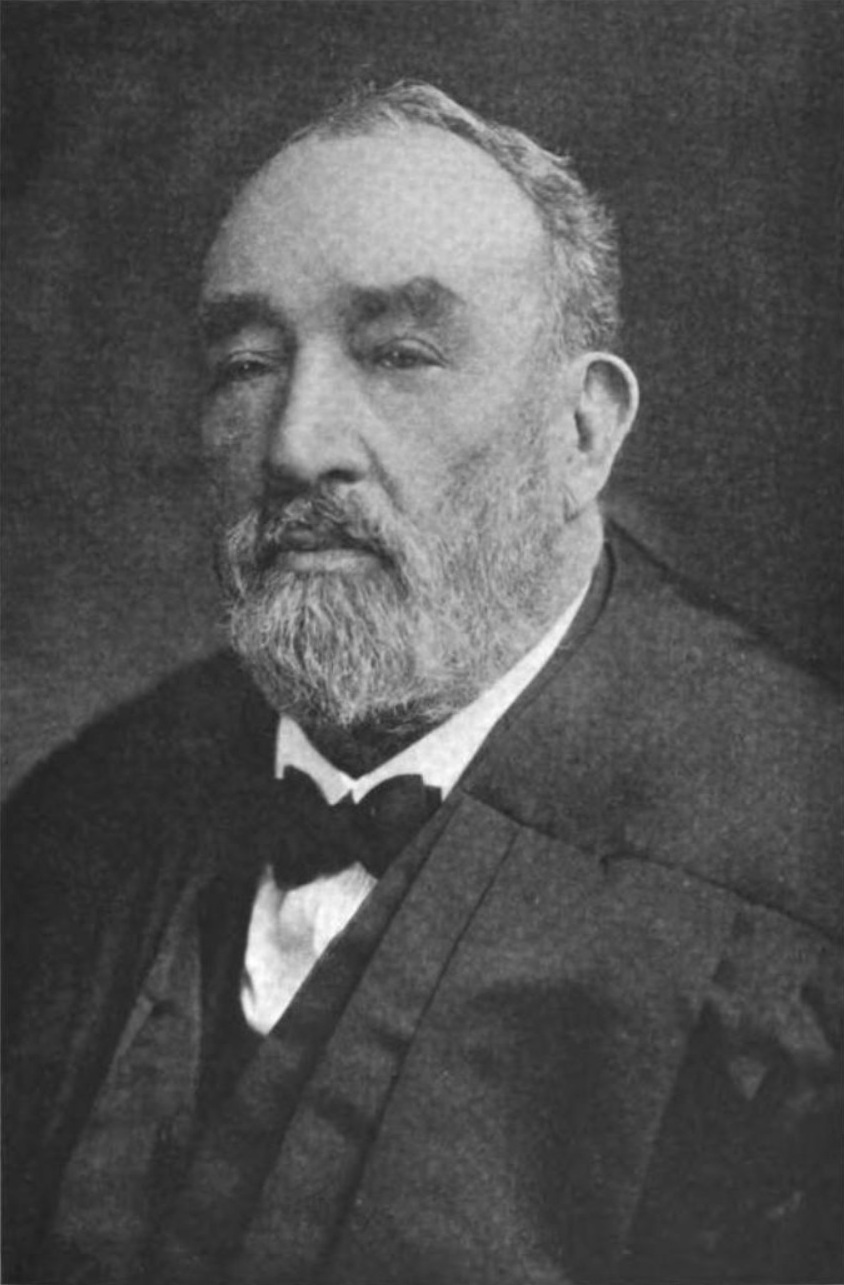

Justice of the Supreme Court of Appeals of West Virginia
- In office November 1, 1915 – December 31, 1916
- Governor: Henry D. Hatfield
- Preceded by: Ira E. Robinson
- Succeeded by: Harold A. Ritz

12th Commissioner of Internal Revenue
- In office March 21, 1889 – April 18, 1893
- President: Benjamin Harrison
- Preceded by: Joseph S. Miller
- Succeeded by: Joseph S. Miller

Personal details
- Born: John W. Mason; January 13, 1842; Monongalia County, Virginia, U.S.
- Died: April 23, 1917 (aged 75); Marion County, West Virginia, U.S.
- Political party: Republican

John W. Mason (January 13, 1842 – April 23, 1917) was an American lawyer, judge, and politician who served as the twelfth Commissioner of Internal Revenue of the United States, from March 21, 1889 to April 18, 1893, and as a justice of the Supreme Court of Appeals of West Virginia from his appointment on November 1, 1915 to December 31, 1916.

== Early life, education, and military service ==
Born on a farm in Monongalia County, Virginia (later West Virginia), in 1842, his "opportunities for schooling were somewhat meager", but he attended his local public schools for a number of years, and later graduated from Monongalia Academy in Morgantown, West Virginia, which subsequently became the foundation of the West Virginia University, in which, for a short time, he was a teacher.

At a young age he decided upon the law as a profession, and began reading law while working in a store belonging to his uncle, Jeremiah J. Hutchinson. However the American Civil War began, and at the age of seventeen he joined the Union army, enlisting in Battery F, 1st West Virginia Light Artillery Regiment, as a private, and attained the rank of a non-commissioned officer. He "took part in the principal battles of West Virginia and the great valley of Virginia", and was honorably discharged in September 1864.

After the war, he returned to teaching school and reading law in the office of Judge John Hagans in Monongalia County, gaining admission to the bar in 1867.

== Career ==
A lifelong member of the Republican Party, he was chairman of the Republican State Executive Committee in his state for four years, from 1872 to 1876. For twelve years, from 1866 to 1888, he was a member of the National Executive Committee of the party. In 1882 he was nominated as the Republican candidate for congress in the second district, but was defeated by William Lyne Wilson by only ten votes. He repeatedly refused to accept nominations for governor, state supreme court justice, and federal appointments.

In 1888, Mason was defeated in a bid for election to the state supreme court. In 1889, he accepted a nomination for the position of Commissioner of Internal Revenue in Washington, D. C., which was tendered to him by President Harrison. Mason was confirmed by the United States Senate on March 20, 1889, and held that office for four years, serving from March 21, 1889 to April 18, 1893.

Following the death of Judge Hagans in 1900, Mason was appointed to fill out Hagans' unexpired term, and was subsequently elected to the seat. For thirteen years thereafter he served as Circuit Court Judge of the Fourteenth Circuit. Shortly after his voluntary retirement from the bench he was made a member of the Virginia State Debt Commission. In the summer of 1915 a vacancy occurred on the state supreme court, and Mason was appointed November 1 of that year to fill this vacancy, serving until January 1, 1917. After leaving the supreme bench, he retired to private life in Fairmont.

== Personal life ==
Mason married Rebecca E. Wallace of Morgantown, West Virginia, on September 6, 1870. They had one son, John William Mason Jr., who also became an attorney and served in World War I.

Mason was a Presbyterian and Freemason. He died in Fairmont, West Virginia, at the age of 75.

Political offices
| Preceded by Joseph S. Miller | United States Commissioner of Internal Revenue; 1889–1893 | Succeeded by Joseph S. Miller |
| Preceded by Ira E. Robinson | Justice of the Supreme Court of Appeals of West Virginia; 1915–1916 | Succeeded by Harold A. Ritz |
