= 1884 West Virginia gubernatorial election =

- October 14, 1884
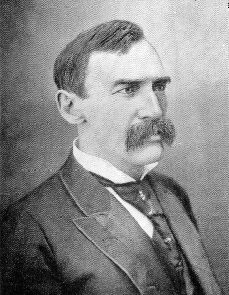

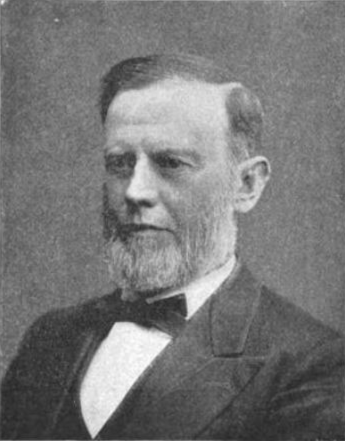
Nominee	Emanuel Willis Wilson	Edwin Maxwell
Party	Democratic	Republican
Popular vote	71,408	66,059
Percentage	51.95%	48.05%
- County results Wilson: 50–60% 60–70% 70–80% 80–90% Maxwell: 50–60% 60–70% 70–80%
Governor before election
Jacob B. Jackson
Democratic
Elected Governor
Emanuel Willis Wilson
Democratic

The 1884 West Virginia gubernatorial election took place on October 14, 1884, to elect the governor of West Virginia.

== Results ==
West Virginia gubernatorial election, 1884
Party	Candidate	Votes	%
Democratic	Emanuel Willis Wilson	71,408	51.95
Republican	Edwin Maxwell	66,059	48.05
Total votes		137,467	100
Democratic hold			

Other sources give different vote totals.
