= Maria Willard Jackson =

- Born: 1830; Pleasants County, West Virginia
- Died: unknown
- Known for: First lady of West Virginia, 1881-1885

Maria Willard Jackson (1830–?) was the wife of former Governor of West Virginia Jacob B. Jackson and served as that state's First Lady, 1881-1885. She was born in 1830, in Pleasants County, West Virginia. In 1855, she married Jacob B. Jackson. At the end of Jackson's term as governor, the capital was moved from Wheeling to Charleston for the last time, so she was the last first lady to serve at Wheeling. After leaving office, the Jacksons returned to Parkersburg, West Virginia. She died on February 27, 1910.

Honorary titles
Preceded by Lucy Fry Mathews	First Lady of West Virginia; 1881 – 1885	Succeeded by Henrietta Cotton Wilson
