= Breezemont =

Historic house in West Virginia, United States

- U.S. National Register of Historic Places
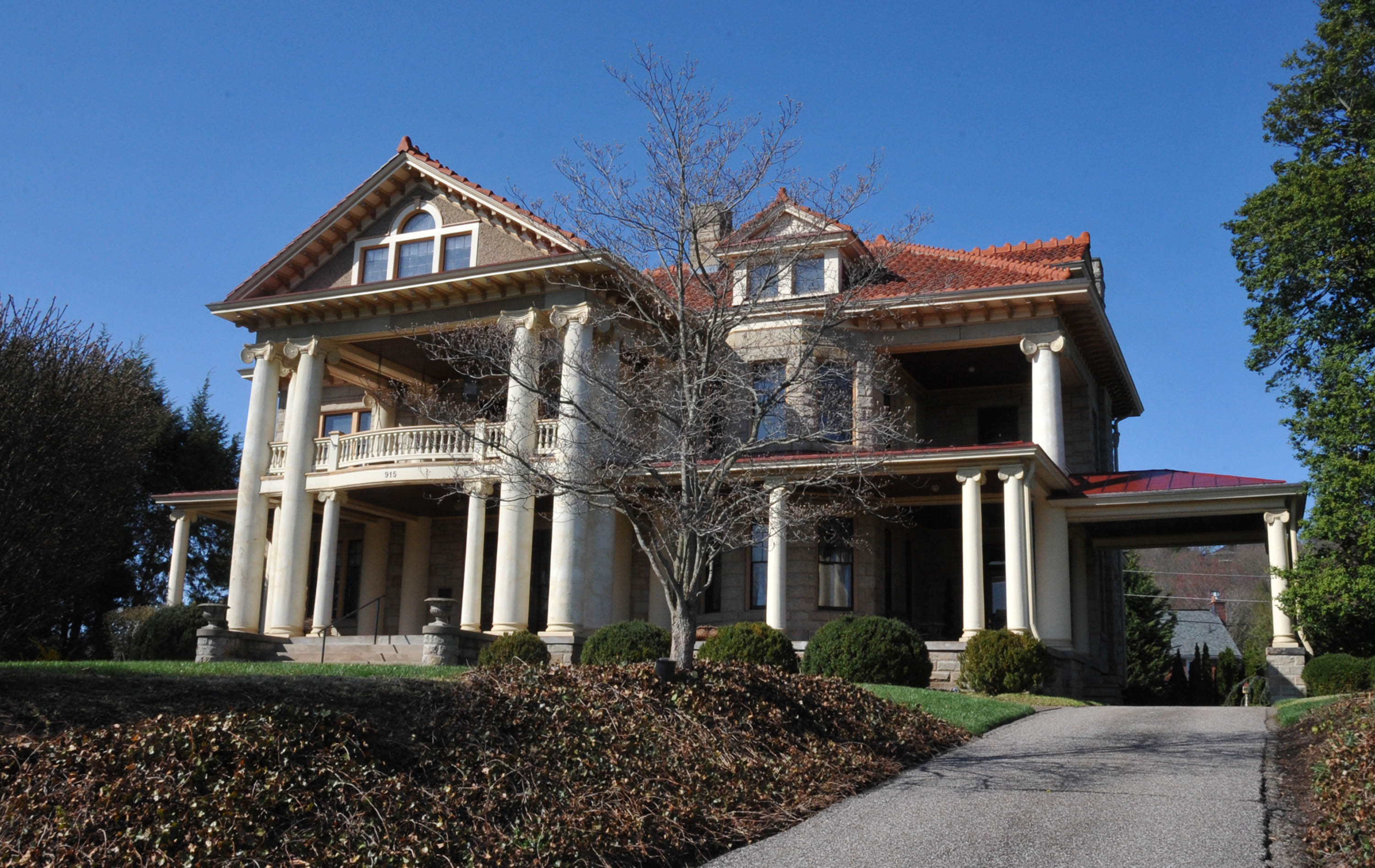

- Location within West Virginia Location within the United States
- Location: 915 Breezemont Dr., Charleston, West Virginia
- Coordinates: 38°21′48″N 81°38′16″W
- Built: 1905
- Architect: Conker, Robert M. & Edward S.
- Architectural style: Classical Revival
- NRHP reference No.: 82004324
- Added to NRHP: April 15, 1982

Breezemont, also known as the Gen. C. C. Watts House, is a historic home located at Charleston, West Virginia. It was built about 1905 for Cornelius Clarkson Watts (1848–1930) an individual who contributed quite significantly to the history of both Kanawha County and the state of West Virginia. It is located atop Watts Hill overlooking much of Charleston, and is an example of vernacular Neo-Classical architecture.

It was listed on the National Register of Historic Places in 1982.
