= Jackson Memorial Fountain =

- U.S. National Register of Historic Places

- Location within West Virginia Location within the United States
- Location: Park Ave. and 17th St., Parkersburg, West Virginia
- Coordinates: 39°16′11″N 81°31′55″W
- Area: 0.3 acres (0.12 ha)
- Built: 1905
- NRHP reference No.: 84003686
- Added to NRHP: August 23, 1984

Jackson Memorial Fountain is a historic fountain located at the entrance to City Park at Parkersburg, Wood County, West Virginia. It was built in 1905 and is a cast iron structure that originally had three tiers. The second tier is topped by Parkersburg's Lady of the Lake statue. It features elaborately sculpted and decorated basins and pedestals. The fountain is dedicated to the locally prominent Jackson family, that included General John Jay Jackson and his sons Federal Judge John Jay Jackson, Jr., Governor Jacob B. Jackson, and Circuit Judge and Congressman James M. Jackson.

The original cast-iron bowls were stuck by lightning and destroyed in the early 1990s; their glass-fibre replacements and the rest of the original structure were destroyed in an October 2018 storm, but a replica was erected in 2020.

It was listed on the National Register of Historic Places in 1984.

== See also ==
- National Register of Historic Places listings in Wood County, West Virginia
