= Charles Brooks Smith =

American politician

Member of the U.S. House of Representatives from West Virginia's 4th district
- In office February 3, 1890 – March 3, 1891
- Preceded by: James Monroe Jackson
- Succeeded by: James Capehart

Personal details
- Born: February 24, 1844 Elizabeth, Virginia, US
- Died: December 7, 1899 (aged 55) Parkersburg, West Virginia, US
- Party: Republican Party

Military service
- Allegiance: United States of America; Union
- Branch/service: cavalry United States Army; Union Army
- Years of service: 1864–1865
- Unit: First West Virginia Cavalry
- Battles/wars: American Civil War

Charles Brooks Smith (February 24, 1844 – December 7, 1899) was a Union Army veteran, businessman and Republican politician who served in the United States House of Representatives for a single term from West Virginia's 4th congressional district.

== Early and family life ==
Born in 1844 in Elizabeth (which in 1848 became the county seat of newly organized Wirt County, Virginia (now West Virginia)) to Virginia-born Caroline B. Smith and her Pennsylvania-born merchant husband, Robert S. Smith. By 1850, the family had moved to Parkersburg, a growing city on the Ohio River and the county seat for Wood County (from which Wirt County had partly been formed), so Charles received his private education there (Virginia having no public schools until after the Civil War).

In 1850, his father was listed as the head of household and a merchant with $3000 in real estate; the family included a year-old daughter Amy, as well as 50-year old Robert S. Smith Sr. (an English-born tanner with $2,500 in real estate) and Virginia-born Thomas Smith (15 years old) and Elizabeth Smith (12 years old; probably their father's younger siblings). By the 1860 census, Wood's father listed his occupation as "private citizen", and he owned $5000 in real estate and $5000 in personal property, the same as his next door neighbor, lawyer Arthur Boreman (the neighbor on the other side, also a "private citizen" 70-year old John P. Mayberry, owned $36,000 in real estate and 9,500 in personal property). The family appears to have moved to a wealthier neighborhood and included an English-born female domestic servant, but neither Robert Smith Sr. nor Thomas, Elizabeth nor Amy.

== American Civil War ==
On March 1, 1864, Smith enlisted in Company I of the First West Virginia Cavalry, associated with the Union Army, and which saw heavy action, ending with General Lee's surrender at Appomattox Court House. Within a week he was commissioned as a second lieutenant (on March 5, 1864), and was honorably discharged on July 8, 1865. The regimental surgeon (who earned the Medal of Honor for saving a drowning soldier on May 22, 1864 was Henry Capehart, and his younger brother Charles Capehart earned a Medal of Honor during the Battle of Gettysburg and was promoted to lieutenant colonel of the regiment on August 1, 1864 (and received his medal in 1898).

== Career ==
After the war, Smith became a steamboat captain and businessman in Parkersburg. In 1875 voters elected Smith the recorder for Wood County. Elected to the Parkersburg city council in 1876, two years later he became the mayor of Parkersburg (1878–1880). This appears to have been a part-time position, for on the 1880 census, Smith lists his occupation as "crockery dealer".

By the end of the year, voters had elected Smith the Wood County sheriff and treasurer (1880–1884). He served as delegate at large to the Republican National Convention in 1888.

Smith successfully contested as a Republican the election of James Monroe Jackson to the Fifty-first Congress and thus served a partial term, from February 3, 1890, to March 3, 1891.

Democrat James Capehart defeated Smith by year's end, so he did not serve in the Fifty-second Congress in 1890.

Smith then sold fire insurance.

== Death and legacy ==
Smith died in Parkersburg, Wood County, West Virginia on December 7, 1899.

U.S. House of Representatives
Preceded by James M. Jackson	Member of the U.S. House of Representatives from West Virginia's 3rd congressional district 1890–1891	Succeeded by James Capehart
