= Henrietta Cotton Wilson =

- Born: 1847; Charleston, West Virginia
- Died: 1915 (aged 67–68); Charleston, West Virginia
- Known for: First lady of West Virginia, 1885-1890
- Spouse: Emanuel Willis Wilson

Henrietta Cotton Wilson (1847–1915) was the wife of former Governor of West Virginia E. Willis Wilson and served as that state's First Lady, from 1885 to1890. She was born in 1847, in Charleston, Virginia, the daughter of prominent medical doctor John T. Cotton and Sara Ashton Fitzhugh Cotton. In 1874, she married E. Willis Wilson. She was the first governor's wife to serve an entire term in Charleston. She died in Charleston in 1915.

Honorary titles
Preceded by Maria Willard Jackson	First Lady of West Virginia; 1885 – 1890	Succeeded by Carrie Watson Fleming
