= George W. Atkinson =

American judge, governor, and Congressman

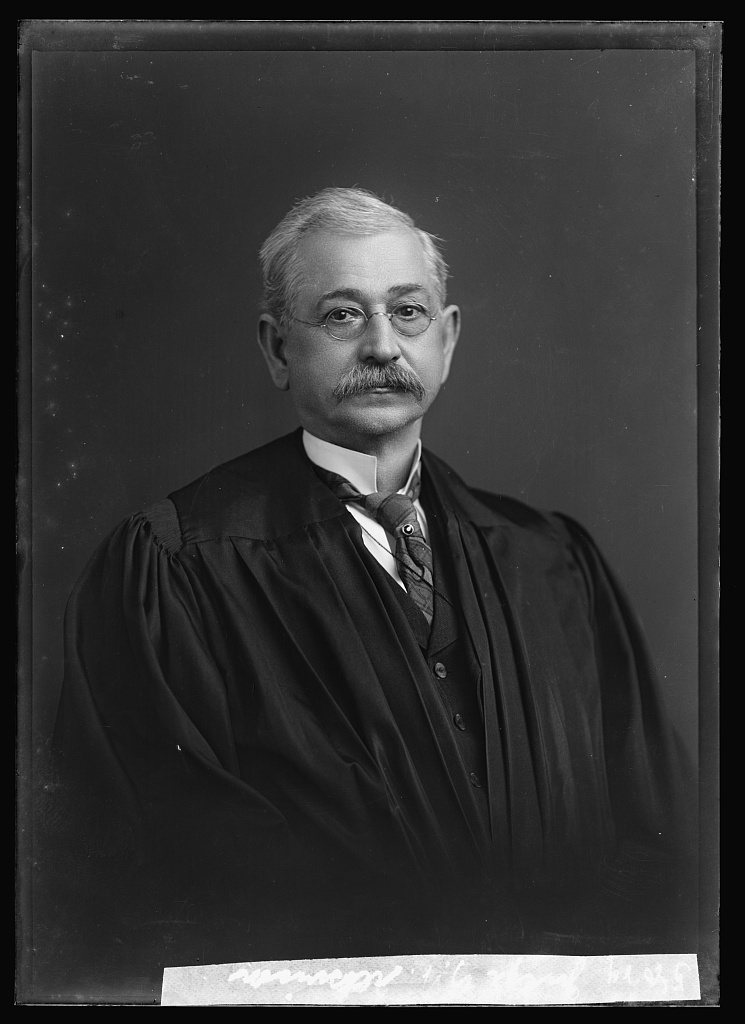
- Judge G.W. Atkinson in judicial robes

Judge of the Court of Claims
- In office April 15, 1905 – April 16, 1916
- Appointed by: Theodore Roosevelt
- Preceded by: Lawrence Weldon
- Succeeded by: James Hay

10th Governor of West Virginia
- In office March 4, 1897 – March 4, 1901
- Preceded by: William A. MacCorkle
- Succeeded by: Albert B. White

Member of the U.S. House of Representatives from West Virginia's 1st district
- In office February 26, 1890 – March 3, 1891
- Preceded by: John O. Pendleton
- Succeeded by: John O. Pendleton

Personal details
- Born: George Wesley Atkinson; June 29, 1845 Charleston, Virginia, US
- Died: April 4, 1925 (aged 79) Charleston, West Virginia, US
- Resting place: Spring Hill Cemetery; Charleston, West Virginia
- Party: Republican
- Education: Ohio Wesleyan University (A.B., A.M.); Mount Union College; Howard University School of Law (LL.B.)
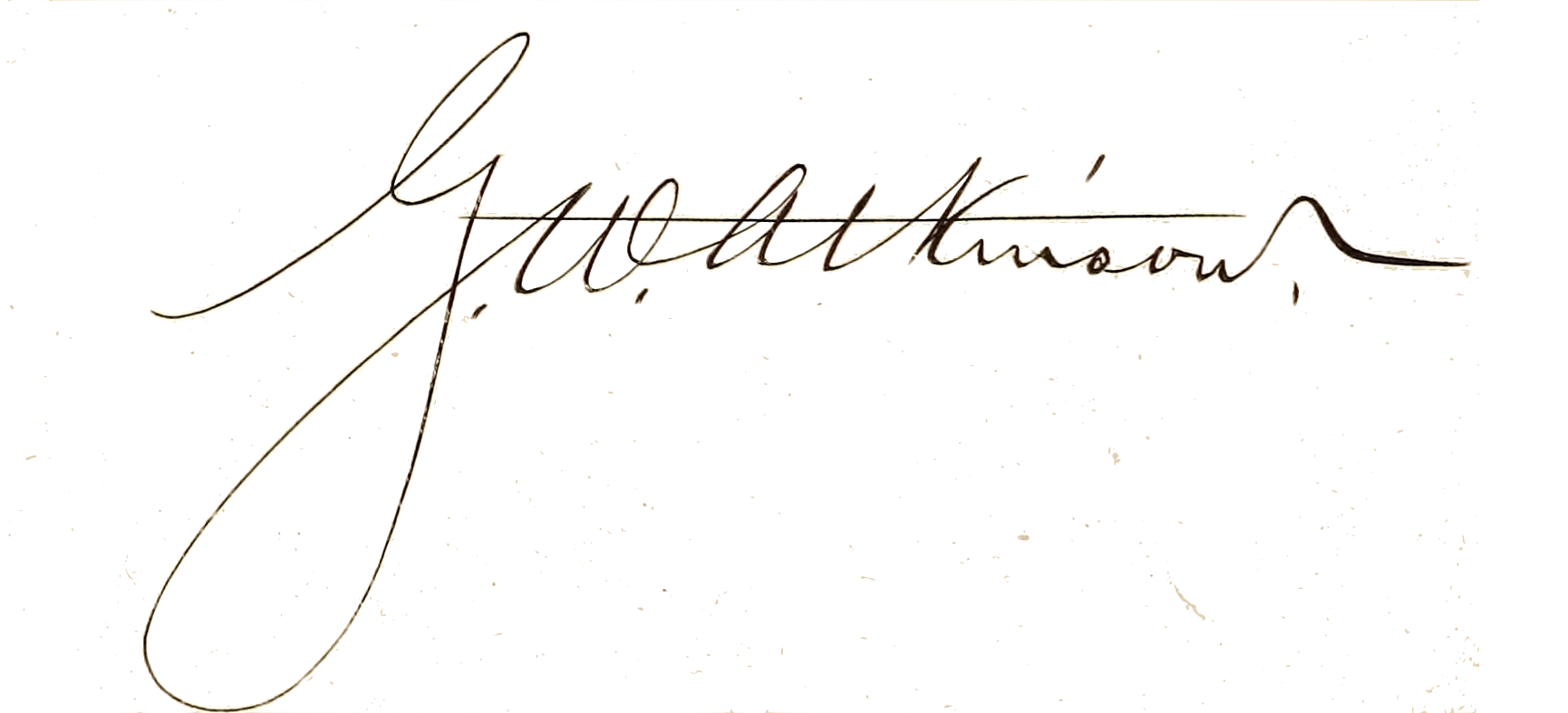
- Signature

George Wesley Atkinson (June 29, 1845 – April 4, 1925) was a United States cavalryman, lawyer, politician, judge and scholar who became the tenth governor of West Virginia after running as the candidate of the Republican Party. He also served in the West Virginia House of Delegates, as well as in the United States House of Representatives from West Virginia and ended his career of public service as a United States federal judge of the Court of Claims.

== Early life and education ==
Born on June 29, 1845, in Charleston, Virginia (now West Virginia), to the former Miriam Radar of Nicholas County and her husband, Col. James Atkinson, a farmer and Kanawha County deputy sheriff. George, the second-born and named for his paternal grandfather, would have seven sisters. Atkinson attended public school in Charleston.

During the Civil War, Atkinson enlisted and mustered out as a private in Company F of the 1st West Virginia cavalry. After the war, in addition to becoming superintendent of the Kanawha County public schools, losing his father and marrying (as discussed below), Atkinson attended Ohio Wesleyan University and received an Artium Baccalaureus degree in 1870. He continued his studies and received an Artium Magister degree in 1873 from the same institution. He also took graduate level courses from Mount Union College, a Methodist-affiliated institution founded in 1845 in Alliance, Ohio, which would award him a PhD "pro merito" in 1887. In 1871 he moved to either Nashville, Tennessee, or Washington, D.C., for legal studies, ultimately receiving a Bachelor of Laws in 1874 from Howard University School of Law. He later attended lectures on law at Columbia University.

He first married Ellen Eagan, with whom he had five children; their firstborn, Howard Atkinson, rose to become a major in the United States Army. In 1897, the widower married Myra Horner Davis Camden, the widow of Judge Gideon D. Camden.

== Career ==
Atkinson Charleston board of education, 1869-'71, and assistant county superintendent of public schools, 1868-'70. became the assistant superintendent of public schools for Kanawha County, serving from 1868 to 1870. For part of this period, Atkinson also collected tolls for the Kanawha River Board (1869 to 1871). He was also the postmaster for Kanawha Courthouse (now Charleston) from 1871 to 1877.

Shortly after graduating from Howard's law school, Atkinson was admitted to the West Virginia bar, beginning a private practice in Charleston from 1875 to 1877. In the final year (1876), he was elected to the West Virginia House of Delegates. Atkinson moved to Wheeling in 1877, and edited the Wheeling Standard from 1877 to 1878. Atkinson then received his next federal job, as revenue agent for the Bureau of Internal Revenue (now the Internal Revenue Service) of the United States Department of the Treasury in Wheeling from 1879 to 1881. He then became the United States Marshal for the District of West Virginia from 1881 to 1885.

=== Congressional service ===
Atkinson ran for Congress as a Republican to represent West Virginia's 1st congressional district. Although he appeared to lose, he successfully contested the election of United States Representative John O. Pendleton to the United States House of Representatives of the 51st United States Congress, so served approximately the final year of the term, from February 26, 1890, to March 3, 1891. Atkinson did not run for reelection in 1890.

=== Newspaperman ===
Following his departure from Congress, Atkinson returned to his legal practice from 1891 to 1896 as well as the newspaper business. He became editor of the West Virginia Journal in Wheeling during the same period.

=== Governor ===
Atkinson upset Democrat Cornelius C. Watts to become the 10th Governor of West Virginia, serving from 1897 to 1901. Democrats had ruled the state for 26 years, but West Virginia faced a fiscal crisis. Atkinson worked against corruption in politics and professional lobbying. He also negotiated with Republican party leader and U.S. Senator Stephen B. Elkins, who eventually agreed to a tax increase. However, concessions split the party's reform wing. Nonetheless, Atkinson worked for an eight-hour workday, to prohibit employing children under 14 years of age, improved working conditions for women, and safety regulations in manufacturing and mining. In addition to speaking out against racist Jim Crow legislation being adopted by neighboring states which disenfranchised most blacks and poor whites, Atkinson championed high-quality public education, a permanent road system, and open and equal immigration. After Atkinson's gubernatorial term ended, President Roosevelt named him (and the Senate confirmed him as) the United States Attorney for the Southern District of West Virginia, a position he held from 1901 to 1905.

=== Federal judge ===
President Theodore Roosevelt on April 15, 1905, gave Atkinson received a recess appointment, to a seat on the Court of Claims (later the United States Court of Claims) vacated by Judge Lawrence Weldon. Roosevelt formally nominated Atkinson for the post on December 5, 1905. Confirmed by the United States Senate on January 16, 1906, Atkinson received his commission the same day. He resigned on April 16, 1916, months before his 71st birthday.

=== Final years and publications ===
Atkinson returned to Charleston and continued to write, as well as remained active in the Republican Party. In 1918 he supported the candidacy of T. Gillis Nutter, an African-American attorney from Charleston, for the state legislature. Nutter also won re-election, and was nearly the only black to occupy statewide office in the South.

Atkinson wrote 11 books of poetry and non-fiction, including History of Kanawha County (1876), West Virginia Pulpit (1878)After the Moonshiners (1881), Revenue Digest (1880); A.B.C. of the Tariff(1882); Don't, or Negative Chips from Blocks of Living Truths (1886); Psychology Simplified (1887), Prominent Men of West Virginia (1890), poems (1899) and Bench and Bar of West Virginia (1919).

== Death, honors and legacy ==
Atkinson died on April 4, 1925, in Charleston. He was interred in Charleston's historic Spring Hill Cemetery.

Atkinson received several honorary degrees, including an LL.D. from U.S. Grant University, an LL.D. from the University of Nashville in 1890, and a D.C.L. from West Virginia University in 1897.

== Gallery ==
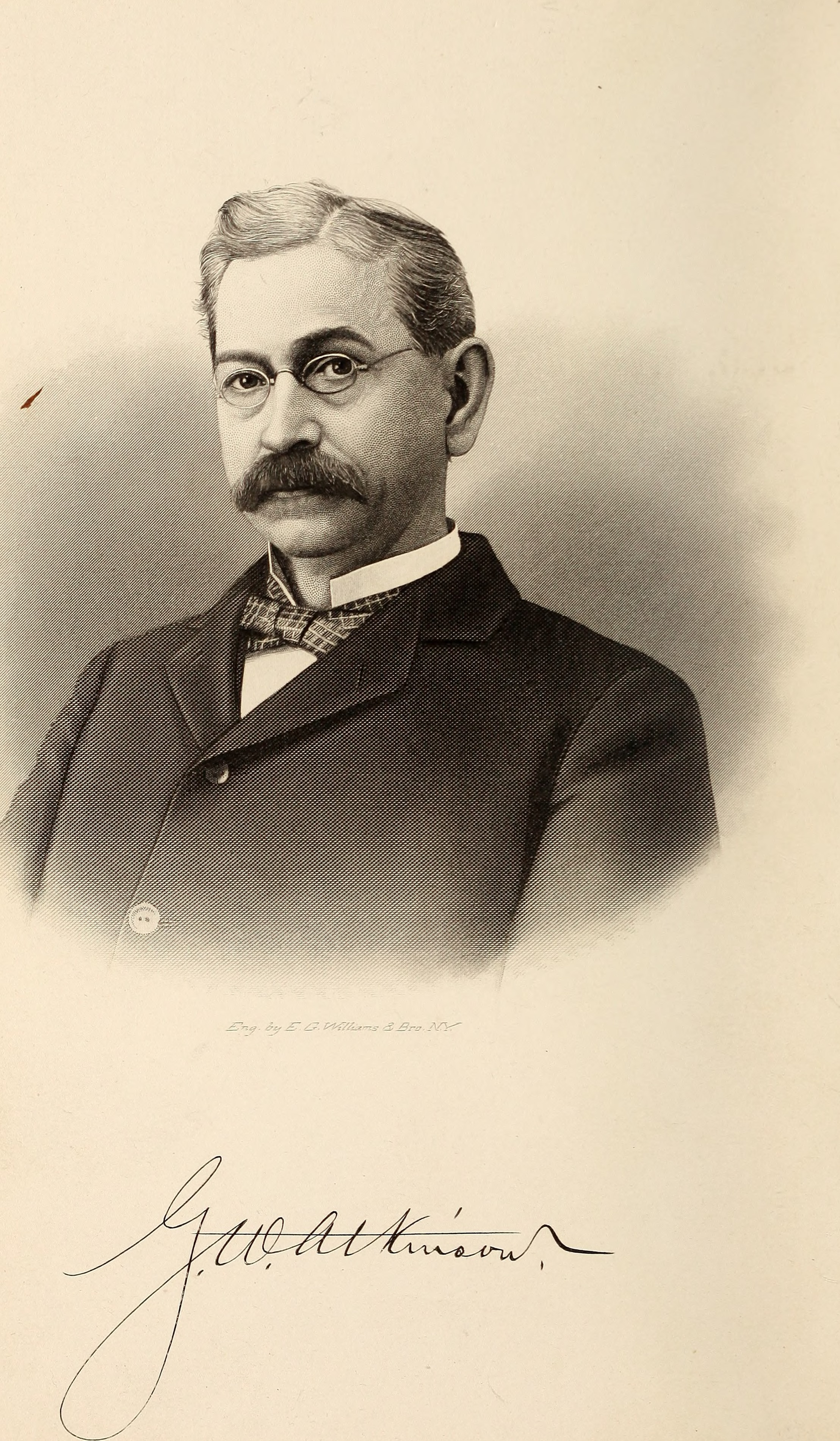
George W. Atkinson (1901)

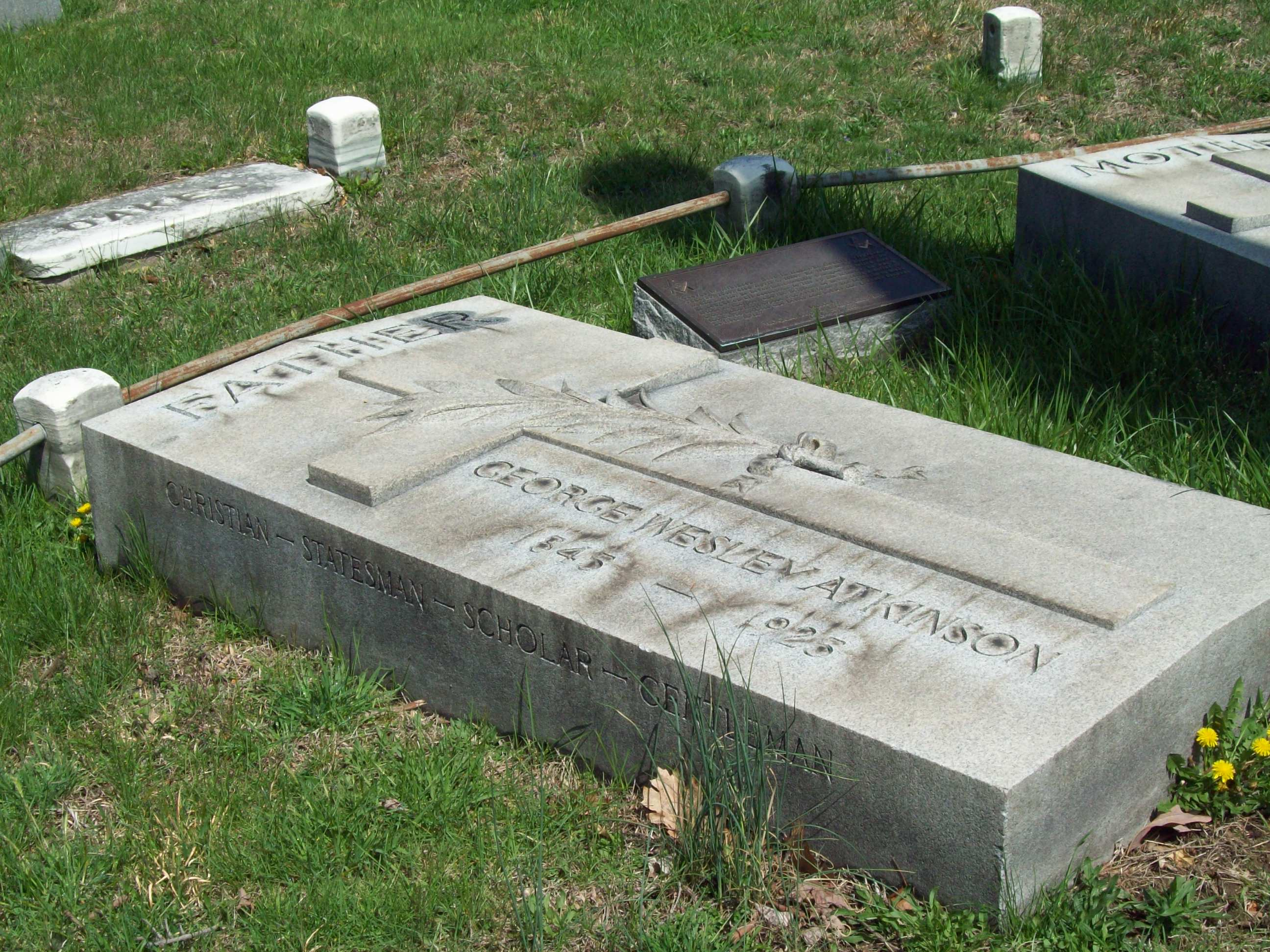
Grave of Gov George W. Atkinson, April 2009

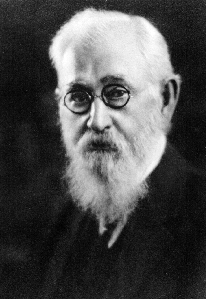
Atkinson as an older man

== Sources ==
- The United States Court of Claims: a history / pt. 1. The judges, 1855–1976 / by Marion T. Bennett / pt. 2. Origin, development, jurisdiction, 1855–1978 / W. Cowen, P. Nichols, M.T. Bennett. Washington, D.C.: Committee on the Bicentennial of Independence and the Constitution of the Judicial Conference of the United States. 1976.
- Johnson, Rossiter, ed. (1906). "Atkinson, George Wesley". The Biographical Dictionary of America. Vol. 1. Boston: American Biographical Society. p. 159.
- George W. Atkinson at National Governors Association
- Biography of George Wesley Atkinson at West Virginia Archives and History
- Inaugural Address of George W. Atkinson

Party political offices
Preceded by Thomas E. Davis	Republican nominee for Governor of West Virginia; 1896	Succeeded by Albert B. White
Political offices
Preceded by William A. MacCorkle	10th Governor of West Virginia; 1897–1901	Succeeded by Albert B. White
U.S. House of Representatives
Preceded by John O. Pendleton	Member of the U.S. House of Representatives from West Virginia's 1st congressional district 1890–1891	Succeeded by John O. Pendleton
Legal offices
Preceded by Lawrence Weldon	Judge of the Court of Claims; 1905–1916	Succeeded by James Hay
