= Wood County Schools =

School district in West Virginia, United States

Address
- 1210 13th St Wood County, West Virginia 26101; United States

District information
- Type: Public
- Motto: Educating Today, Preparing for Tomorrow
- Grades: PK–12
- Superintendent: Christie Willis
- Schools: 27
- NCES District ID: 5401620
- Affiliation: No

Students and staff
- Students: 11,310 (2023–24)
- Teachers: 870.0 (on an FTE basis)
- Student–teacher ratio: 13.00

Other information
- Website: www.woodcountyschoolswv.com

Wood County Schools is the operating school district within Wood County, West Virginia, United States.

== Board of education ==
The Wood County Board of Education has the role of overseeing and guiding the school district's education policies and budget.

Board members
Role	Name
Board President	Ron Tice
Board Vice President	Judy Johnson
Board Member	Debra Hendershot
Board Member	Simon Hargus
Board Member	Haley Meredith

== Schools ==
The following schools are in Wood County Schools:

=== High schools ===
- Parkersburg High School
- Parkersburg South High
- Williamstown Middle/High

=== Middle schools ===
- Blennerhassett Middle
- Edison Middle
- Hamilton Middle
- Jackson Middle
- Williamstown Middle/High

=== Elementary schools ===
- Blennerhassett Elementary
- Criss Elementary
- Emerson Elementary
- Franklin Elementary Center
- Gihon Elementary
- Greenmont Elementary
- Jefferson Elementary Center
- Kanawha Elementary
- Lubeck Elementary
- Lincoln Elementary (as of 2026 this is yet to be opened)
- Madison Elementary
- Martin Elementary
- Mineral Wells Elementary
- Neale Elementary
- Vienna Elementary
- Williamstown Elementary

=== Vocational ===
- Caperton Center For Applied Technology
