= James Capehart =

American politician

James Capehart (March 7, 1847 – April 28, 1921) was a businessman and political figure in the Democratic Party from West Virginia. He served as a United States representative from West Virginia in the 52nd and 53rd Congresses.

== Biography ==
Capehart was born in Point Pleasant in Mason County, Virginia (now West Virginia). He attended the public schools and went to Marietta College, Ohio. He also studied at Duff's Commercial College in Pittsburgh, Pennsylvania. He worked for his father as a clerk and bookkeeper. From 1867 to 1903 he pursued an interest in agriculture and breeding livestock. He served as president of the Mason County Court in 1871, 1872, and again from 1880 to 1885.

In 1888 Capehart was chosen as a delegate to the Democratic National Convention. He was elected to his first term in Congress in 1890, and was re-elected in 1892, serving from 1891 to 1895 (March 4, 1891 – March 3, 1895; the 52nd and 53rd United States Congresses)

Capehart chose not to run for re-election in the 1894 contest. After returning to West Virginia, he worked as president of the Point Pleasant National Bank, beginning in 1901.

Around 1903 Capehart renewed his interest in agriculture, growing fruit in Brevard County, Florida. He lived in Cocoa, Florida until his death in 1921. He was buried in Lone Oak Cemetery, Point Pleasant, West Virginia.

== See also ==
- West Virginia's congressional delegations

== Sources ==
- United States Congress. "James Capehart (id: C000129)". Biographical Directory of the United States Congress.

U.S. House of Representatives
Preceded by Charles Brooks Smith	Member of the U.S. House of Representatives from West Virginia's 4th congressional district 1891–1895	Succeeded by Warren Miller
