= Belle Goshorn MacCorkle =

First Lady of West Virginia from 1893 to 1897

- Born: 1841; Charleston, Virginia
- Died: September 12, 1923; Charleston, West Virginia
- Known for: First lady of West Virginia, 1893-1897

Belle Goshorn MacCorkle (1841 – September 12, 1923) was the wife of former Governor of West Virginia William A. MacCorkle and served as that state's First Lady, 1893–1897. She was born in 1841, at Charleston, West Virginia. In 1884, she married William A. MacCorkle. The MacCorkles were the first to reside in the state supplied Governor's Mansion. She died at the MacCorkle home Sunrise on September 12, 1923.

Honorary titles
Preceded by Carrie Watson Fleming	First Lady of West Virginia; 1893–1897	Succeeded by Myra Horner Camden Atkinson
