= Aretas B. Fleming =

American politician

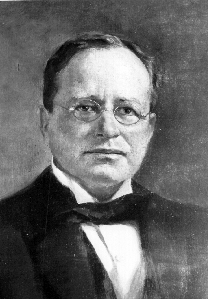

8th Governor of West Virginia
- In office February 6, 1890 – March 4, 1893
- Preceded by: Emanuel Willis Wilson
- Succeeded by: William A. MacCorkle

Personal details
- Born: October 15, 1839 Fairmont, Virginia (now West Virginia)
- Died: October 13, 1923 (aged 83) Fairmont, West Virginia
- Party: Democratic
- Spouse: Carrie Watson Fleming
- Profession: Politician

Aretas Brooks Fleming (October 15, 1839 – October 13, 1923) was the eighth governor of West Virginia. In 1865, he married Carrie Watson. When he ran as the Democratic nominee in the election of 1888, the election was disputed by the Legislature. In 1890, the Legislature agreed that Fleming had defeated Nathan Goff, Jr. Both Fleming and Goff were sworn in as governor on March 4, 1889.

The Supreme Court of Appeals of West Virginia ruled that outgoing governor Emmanuel Willis Wilson would remain governor; State Senate President Robert S. Carr had claimed authority until the Court reached its decision. In 1890, the Legislature agreed that Fleming had defeated Nathan Goff, Jr. As a result, Fleming did not assume the office until February 6, 1890. He left office in 1893 and continued to practice law, and pursue business interests, specifically in the coal industry. Fleming, along with his brother-in-law Clarence W. Watson, formed many coal companies (including the Consolidation Coal Company), and sought to remove their competitors.

Fleming died on October 13, 1923, in Fairmont, West Virginia. He is interred at Woodlawn Cemetery. A large obelisk marks his grave. A number of streets in Fairmont bear the Fleming name.

== See also ==
- List of governors of West Virginia

Party political offices
Preceded by Emanuel Willis Wilson	Democratic nominee for Governor of West Virginia; 1888	Succeeded by William A. MacCorkle
Political offices
Preceded by Emanuel Willis Wilson	Governor of West Virginia; 1890–1893	Succeeded by William A. MacCorkle
