= Linda Goodman =

American astrologer

- Born: Mary Alice Kemery; April 9, 1925; Morgantown, West Virginia, U.S.
- Died: October 21, 1995 (aged 70); Colorado Springs, Colorado, U.S.
- Occupations: Astrologer; Numerologist; Writer; Poet

Mary Alice Kemery (April 9, 1925 – October 21, 1995), popularly known as Linda Goodman, was a New York Times bestselling American astrologer and poet. She wrote the first astrology book to make the New York Times Best Seller list. She has been described as someone who converted astrology from "a niche interest into the center of the Zeitgeist."

== Early life and background ==
Linda Goodman was born in Morgantown, West Virginia. Although she never revealed her year of birth, swearing even her father to silence, it emerged posthumously that she was born in 1925. According to data collector Frank C. Clifford, Linda was born in Morgantown on April 9, 1925, at 6:05 a.m. Clifford cites Linda's birth certificate as his source. Her father's name was Robert Stratton Kemery; her mother's maiden name was Mazie McBee. By her own account, Goodman was born in her maternal grandparents' house on 115 Kingwood Street. She attended and graduated from Parkersburg High School in 1943 aged 18 years.

== Career ==
While working in radio, she met her second husband, Sam Goodman, and took his last name. Goodman made a breakthrough in 1957 hosting a WJAS radio show in Pittsburgh called Love Letters from Linda. It was for the radio show she assumed the name 'Linda'. Each show consisted of her reading letters written between soldiers and their loved ones. Each letter was punctuated with a popular song of the day.

She began her career writing for newspapers in West Virginia and Kentucky. She later wrote speeches for American civil rights leader Whitney Young, who served for several years as president of the National Urban League.

=== Astrology/writings ===
Books written by Linda Goodman include:

- Sun Signs. Taplinger, New York, (1968). OCLC 251596293.
- Venus Trines at Midnight. Bantam Books, New York, 1970. OCLC 883246978.
- Linda Goodman's Love Signs. Harper & Row, New York, 1978. ISBN 0-06-011550-5.
- Linda Goodman's Love Poems: Levels of Love Awareness. Harper & Row, New York, 1980. ISBN 0-06-011643-9.
- Linda Goodman's Star Signs: The Secret Codes of the Universe A Practical Guide for the New Age. St Martin's Press; First Edition (January 1, 1987) ISBN 0-312-01352-3
- Linda Goodman's Star Signs: The Secret Codes of the Universe A Practical Guide for the New Age. St. Martin's Press, New York, 1988. ISBN 0-312-95191-4
- Gooberz. Hampton Roads, Norfolk, 1989. ISBN 0-9624375-0-6
- Relationship Signs. Bantam, New York, 1998. ISBN 0-333-74030-0

Some have suggested that Linda Goodman was responsible for accelerating the growth of the New Age movement through the unprecedented success of her first astrology book Linda Goodman's Sun Signs. This was the first astrology book ever to earn a spot on the New York Times Best Seller list. It was followed by Linda Goodman's Love Signs, which also made the New York Times Best Seller list and set an industry record with $2.25 million being paid for the paperback rights, the highest for a non-fiction book at that time.

In these books Goodman explains her astrological theory, which implies that a planet or other celestial body has no effect at all until it is discovered in "its proper time in the universal plan".

Gooberz, begun in 1967, is a long poem riddled with myriad occult references and symbolism. It is also a thinly veiled autobiography, which explores two of her significant romantic relationships: her marriage to William Snyder and her love affair with marine biologist Robert Brewer. The book surveys her ideas on reincarnation, karma, love, and miracles.

== Personal life ==
Linda Goodman first married John DeVore (1948), then William H. Snyder (1949) and finally Sam Goodman (1955). She was mother to four children: Sally and William (Bill) Snyder from her first marriage, and Jill and Michael Goodman from her second marriage. She also had at least one other child, a daughter who died in infancy.

=== Daughter ===
Linda Goodman's Love Signs also references what she referred to as the "disappearance" of her eldest daughter, 18-year old Sarah "Sally" Snyder, in the 1970s, and the mystery around her reported death. Linda's husband Sam Goodman had identified the body at the New York morgue, and had the body cremated, but recanted the identification a few days later. Linda never accepted the official police closure report as a suicide or accidental suicide, and spent much money, and continued to search for Sally for the rest of her own life. Finally, she believed that her daughter was dead but would return by reincarnation.

=== Death ===
Goodman made Cripple Creek, Colorado, her home during the latter part of her life. She first lived in a small Victorian house on Carr Street ("the little crooked house on the crooked little street") and later moved to a newer home on the outskirts of the main town. Both homes still boast her spiritually themed stained-glass windows. The house on Carr Street was later a bed and breakfast. She died in Colorado Springs, Colorado, on October 21, 1995, at the age of 70, from complications of diabetes.

Crystal Bush, a businesswoman from Ireland, befriended Goodman at the end of her life and obtained the publicity rights to the astrologer's name at her death. Bush then published the book Linda Goodman's Relationship Signs.

=== Beliefs ===
In addition to her belief in astrology Goodman also advocated for immortality which she told her followers could be achieved through practices such as vegetarianism, taking nutritional supplements, moisturizers and fresh air, while avoiding smoking and sexual promiscuity and imagining your cells spiraling backwards.

Goodman's books arrived in the 1960s and 70s at a time when Astrology was experiencing a swell of popularity and crossing over into the mainstream.
