= Sunrise (Charleston, West Virginia) =

Historic house in West Virginia, United States

- U.S. National Register of Historic Places
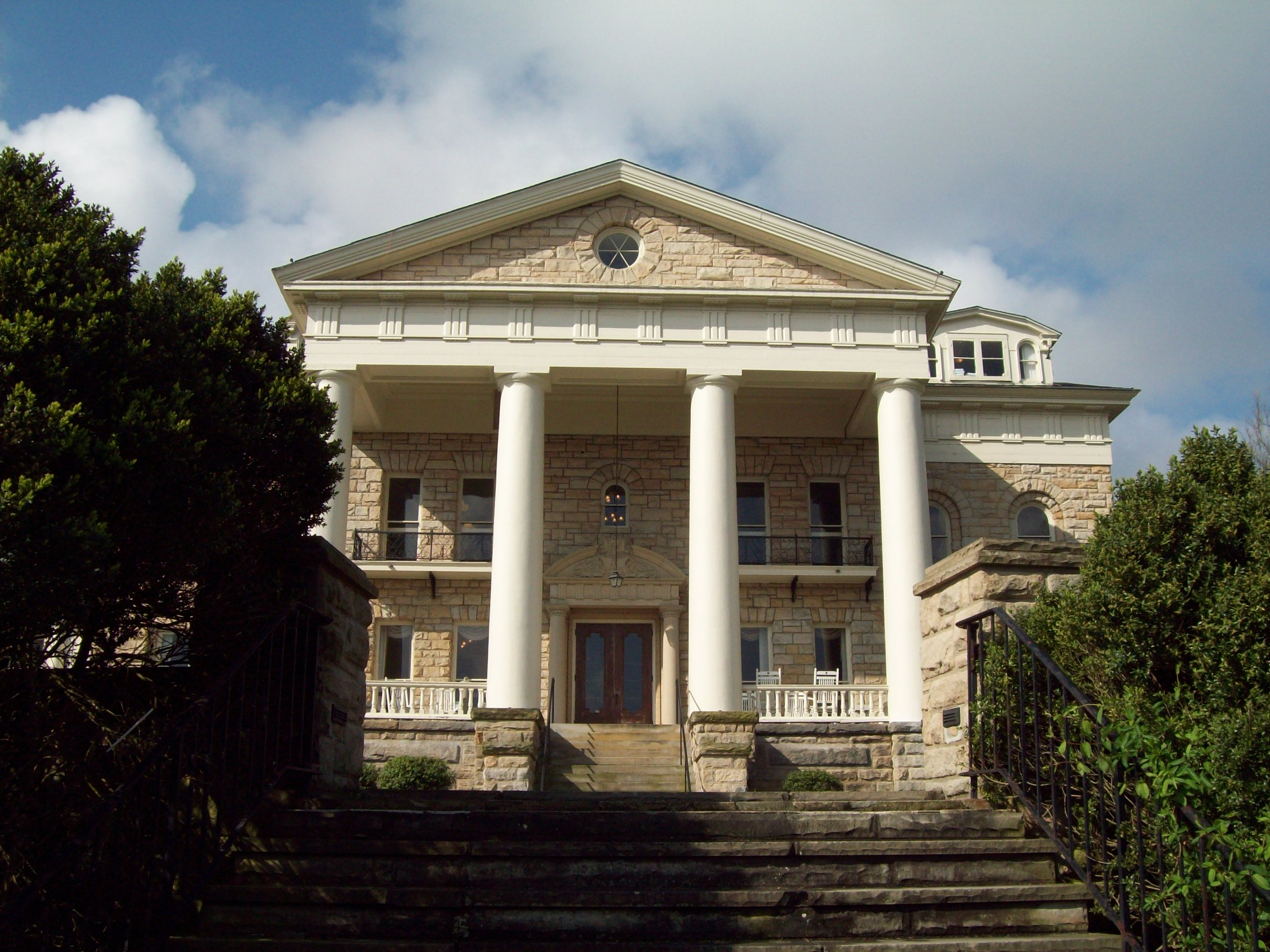
- Sunrise (Front View), April 2009

- Location within West Virginia Location within the United States
- Location: 746 Myrtle Rd., Charleston, West Virginia
- Coordinates: 38°20′44″N 81°38′29″W
- Built: 1905
- Architectural style: Colonial Revival, Georgian Revival
- NRHP reference No.: 74002008
- Added to NRHP: July 24, 1974

Sunrise, also known as MacCorkle Mansion, is a historic home located at Charleston, West Virginia. It was built in 1905 by West Virginia's ninth governor, William A. MacCorkle (1857-1930). It is a long, three-story stone mansion. Its gabled roof is dotted with dormers and chimneys and surmounts an intricate, but wide, cornice which gives the illusion that the house is smaller than it actually is. The Georgian structure rests on a bluff overlooking the Kanawha River, and from the northern portico one can see nearly the entire city of Charleston. The north side features four magnificent Doric, or neo-classic, columns which support the cornice and ashlar-finished pediment. In 1961 Sunrise Foundation, Inc., was formed for the purpose of purchasing the mansion and grounds.

It was listed on the National Register of Historic Places in 1974.

The mansion was the former home of the Sunrise Museum, a science and art museum that became the Avampato Discovery Museum when it moved into the Clay Center for the Arts and Sciences - West Virginia when it opened in 2003. Currently the house is privately owned and is not open to the public.

== Gallery ==
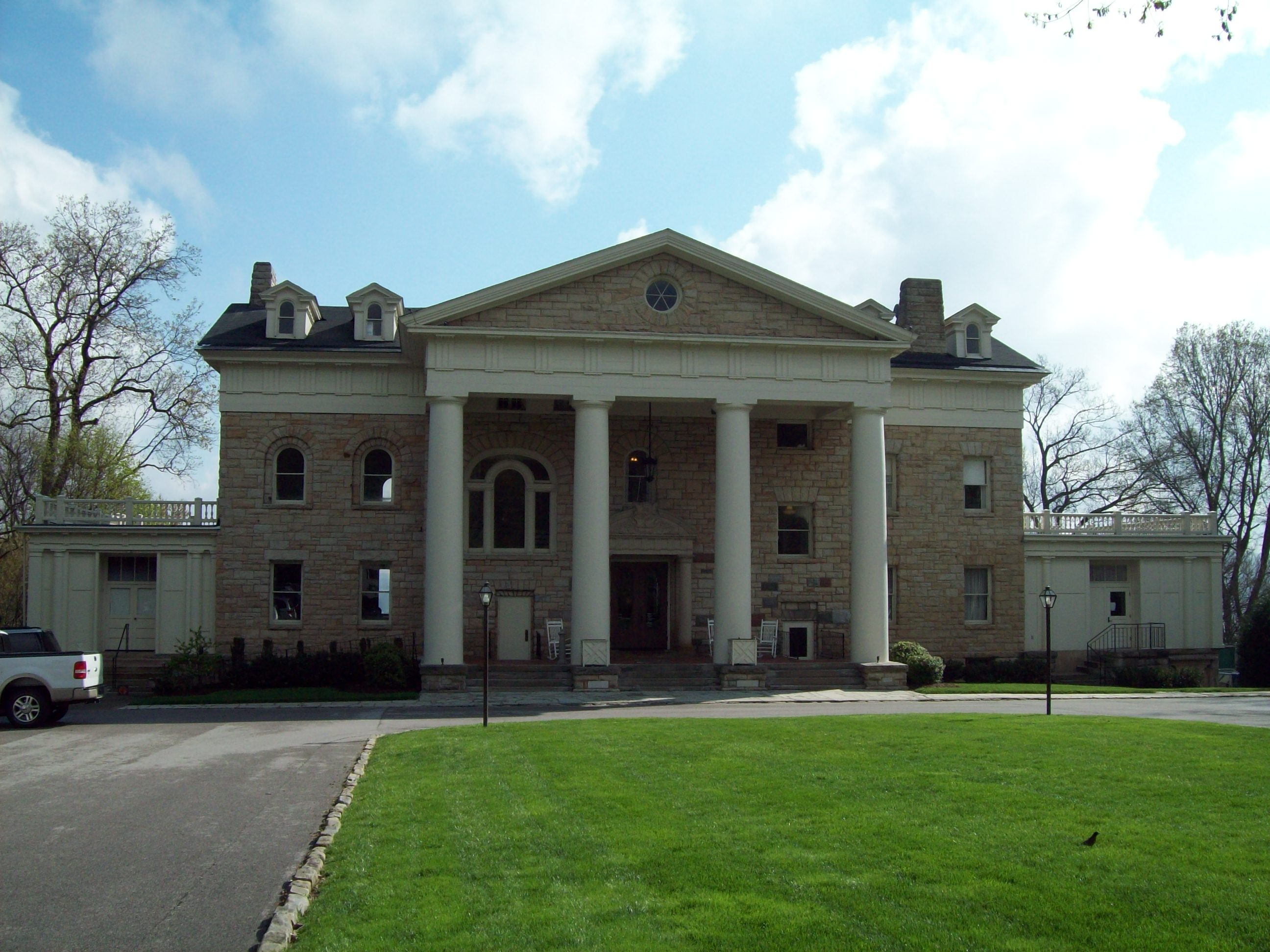
Sunrise (Street View), April 2009
