= William Brockenbrough (judge) =

American judge

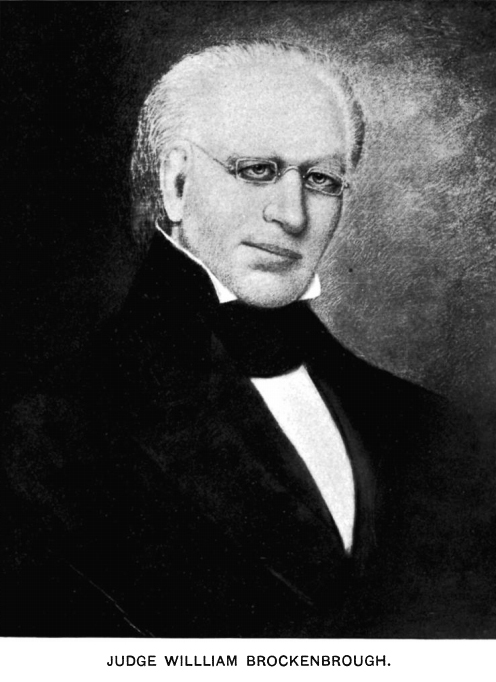

Justice of the Virginia Supreme Court
- In office February 20, 1834 – December 10, 1838

Judge of the General Court
- In office 1809–1834

Member of the Virginia House of Delegates from Hanover County
- In office December 7, 1807-December 3, 1809 Serving with John Bowe
- Preceded by: Bathurst Jones
- Succeeded by: John Starke

Member of the Virginia Council of State
- In office June 3, 1803-May 1806

Member of the Virginia House of Delegates from Essex County
- In office December 7, 1801-June 2, 1803 Serving with Tunstall Banks
- Preceded by: James M. Garnett
- Succeeded by: Lewis Booker

Personal details
- Born: July 10, 1778 Tappahannock, Virginia
- Died: December 10, 1838 (aged 60) Richmond, Virginia
- Resting place: White Plain plantation, King and Queen County, Virginia
- Spouse: Judith Robinson White
- Education: College of William and Mary
- Occupation: Lawyer, judge, politician

William Brockenbrough (July 10, 1778 – December 10, 1838) was a Virginia lawyer, planter, politician and judge, including on what became the Supreme Court of Virginia.

== Early life and education ==
Brockenbrough was born in Tappahannock in Essex County, Virginia, United States, the son of Dr. John Brockenbaugh and his wife Sarah Roane, the daughter of Co. William Roane. He attended the College of William and Mary in 1798. He studied law.

== Career ==
Brockenbrough had a private legal practice in Essex and surrounding counties, and before the state's highest court in Richmond.

During much of his adult life, Brockenbrough would be considered a key member of the "Richmond Junto", alongside his brother John, as well as Judge Spencer Roane and journalist Thomas Ritchie—all from Essex County, so the group was also sometimes known as the "Essex Junto". He became a noted advocate of state's rights, and also published articles under the pseudonym Aristogitan which were critical of fellow Richmonder John Marshall, particularly the 1819 decision in McCulloch v. Maryland.

Brockenbrough's political career began in 1802–03, when Essex County voters elected him as one of their representatives in the House of Delegates. He was re-elected once, and after a term on the Council of State described below, again won election and re-election. Brockenbrough did not run for re-election after his second term as a delegate because he became a member of the Council of State in May, 1803. As a member of the Commonwealth's executive body, he was not allowed to hold a legislative office. However, Virginia's state constitution at the time forbad that body remaining unchanged, requiring the legislature to remove two members from that body every third year, and Brockenbrough was one of those chosen for removal in December 1804. Thus, Brockenbrough's term on that body ended the following May.

Virginia legislators first elected Brockenbrough as a judge of the general court on February 7, 1809. Not long after the adoption of the Virginia Constitution of 1830, and following the death of Judge John W. Green, on February 20, 1834, Brockenbrough was appointed a judge of the Supreme Court of Appeals but died just four years later.

In 1810, Brockenbrough may have owned about 30 slaves in Hanover County. In 1820 Brockenbrough owned 20 slaves in Henrico County, Virginia, which included Richmond. A decade later, the last census of his life reported him as owning 23 slaves in Richmond, as well as 46 slaves in Hanover County. His relationship to a family of six free black people in King and Queen County with the same surname is unclear.

== Personal life ==
In 1806, he married Judith Robinson White and became the father of John White Brockenbrough. According to family history, Dolley Madison said, "as a friend I find Mrs. Judith Brockenbrough unequalled." In 1814, following the burning of Washington by Admiral Cockburn, she and Dolley Madison saved what valuables they could from the White House before taking refuge at the Octagon House. Judith Brockenbrough's initials are scratched on a windowpane in an upstairs bedroom at Mount Vernon. William Brockenbrough's home in Richmond, at Fifth and Clay streets, was frequently visited by Chief Justice Marshall and other notable citizens of Richmond.

== Children ==
One son, John White Brockenbroug married Mary C. Bowyer and became a judge of the United States Court for the Western District of Virginia, founder and head of his own law school at Lexington, Professor in the Law School of Washington and Lee University, member of the Confederate States of America Congress, and a publisher of law decisions. One daughter, Mary, married another lawyer, Willoughby Newton. Another daughter, named Judith White after her mother, married Episcopal clergyman John P. McGuire and published her diary written during the American Civil War, "The Diary of a Southern Refugee".
