= James M. Jackson =

American politician (1825–1901)

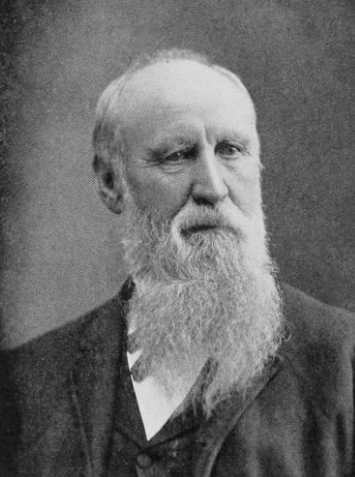

Member of the U.S. House of Representatives from West Virginia's 4th district
- In office March 4, 1889 – February 3, 1890
- Preceded by: Charles E. Hogg
- Succeeded by: Charles Brooks Smith

Judge for the Wood County Criminal Court
- In office 1891–1901

Personal details
- Born: December 3, 1825 Parkersburg, Virginia (now West Virginia)
- Died: February 14, 1901 (aged 75) Parkersburg, West Virginia
- Party: Democratic Party
- Education: Princeton University
- Occupation: Lawyer; judge; politician

James Monroe Jackson (December 3, 1825 – February 14, 1901) was a lawyer and Democratic politician from West Virginia who served as a United States representative in the 51st United States Congress.

== Early and family life ==
Jackson was born in Parkersburg in Wood County, Virginia (now West Virginia) on December 3, 1825. His grandfather John G. Jackson had served in the U.S. House of Representatives as well as a U.S. District Judge, and earlier as a Brigadier General in the Virginia militia. His father was also (Virginia militia) General John Jay Jackson. His brothers became Federal Judge John Jay Jackson, Jr. and Circuit Judge and West Virginia Governor Jacob B. Jackson.

== Career ==
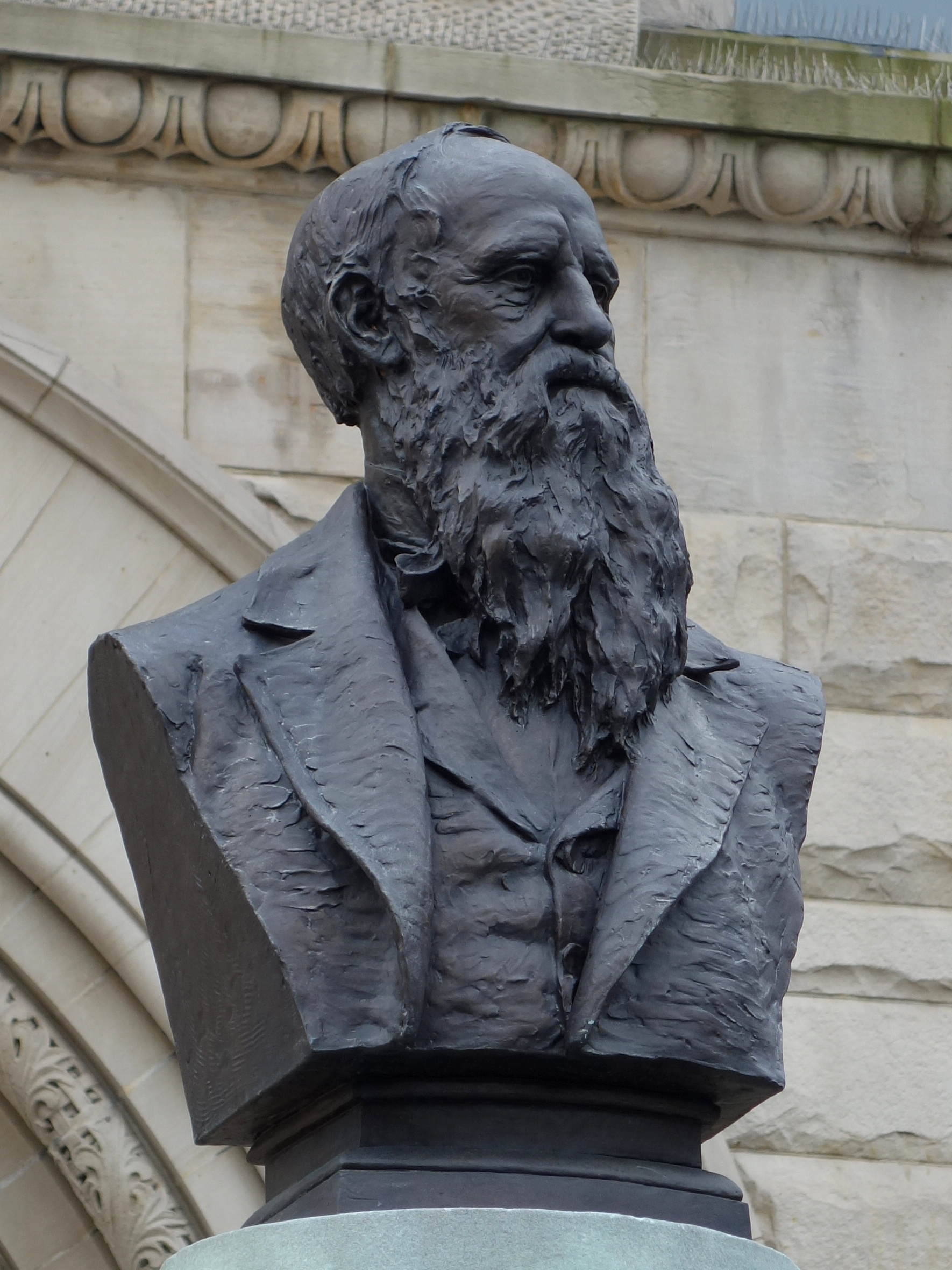
Memorial to J. M. Jackson by J. Massey Rhind

He graduated from Princeton University in 1845. After studying law, he was admitted to the bar in 1847. He opened his practice in Parkersburg. He won election as prosecuting attorney for Wood County in 1856 and 1860. He served as a member of the West Virginia House of Delegates in 1870 and 1871.

He was a member of the State constitutional convention in 1872. He served as a judge on the fifth circuit court from 1873 to 1888, when he resigned after thinking he was elected to the U.S. Congress in a very close race with Republican Charles Brooks Smith. Although Jackson presented credentials as a Democratic Member-elect to the Fifty-first Congress and served from March 4, 1889, until February 3, 1890, Smith, successfully contested the election and served the final year of the term before being defeated for re-election by Democrat James Capehart.

West Virginia legislators then elected Jackson as a judge on the criminal court for Wood County, where he served from 1891 until his death.

== Death and legacy ==
Jackson died in Parkersburg, West Virginia on February 14, 1901. He was buried at Riverview Cemetery. The Jackson Memorial Fountain at Parkersburg is dedicated to the Jackson family.

== See also ==
- West Virginia's congressional delegations

== Sources ==
United States Congress. "Jackson, James Monroe (id: J000018)". Biographical Directory of the United States Congress. Online. September 11, 2007.

U.S. House of Representatives
Preceded by Charles E. Hogg	Member of the U.S. House of Representatives from West Virginia's 4th congressional district 1889–1890	Succeeded by Charles Brooks Smith
