= Macguire McDuff =

American swimmer (born 2003)

Personal information
- Nickname: "Showtime"
- National team: United States
- Born: February 28, 2003 (age 23)
- Height: 6 ft 7 in (201 cm)
- Weight: 225 lb (102 kg)

Sport
- Sport: Swimming
- Strokes: Freestyle
- College team: University of Florida

Macguire McDuff (born February 28, 2003) is an American swimmer and former USA National Team Member. He is a five-time NCAA champion and former holder of American and NCAA records.

== Early life and education ==
McDuff attended Parkersburg South High School in Parkersburg, West Virginia. He later committed to swim for the University of Florida, where he competed as a member of the Florida Gators men's swimming and diving team.

== Career ==
=== 2022–2023 ===
McDuff competed at the 2023 NCAA Division I Men's Swimming and Diving Championships. There, he contributed to setting NCAA records and US Open records in the 200-yard freestyle relay, 400-yard freestyle relay, and 400-yard medley relay. Additionally, he reached the final in the men's 100-meter freestyle at the 2023 USA Swimming Championships.

=== 2023–2024 ===
At the 2024 SEC Swimming & Diving Championships, McDuff helped set the American record in the 200-yard medley relay. He also won the 200-yard freestyle with a time of 1:30.64, making him the 11th-fastest performer of all time in the event.

During the 2024 NCAA Division I Men's Swimming and Diving Championships, McDuff contributed to breaking the NCAA and US Open records in the 200-yard medley relay. Alongside teammates Adam Chaney and Josh Liendo, McDuff helped the trio concurrently hold every men's NCAA relay record except the 800-yard freestyle relay. He also secured a victory in the 200-yard freestyle relay.

Later that year, McDuff competed at the 2024 USA Olympic Swimming Trials in Indianapolis, Indiana. He qualified for the final in the men's 100-meter freestyle, clocking a time of 48.04.

== Retirement ==
On September 23, 2024, McDuff, who was at the peak of his career and heading into his senior season at Florida, unexpectedly announced his retirement from competitive swimming.

== Personal best times ==
=== Long course meters (50 m pool) ===
Event	Time	Meet	Location	Date	Ref
100 m freestyle	48.04	2024 USA Olympic Swimming Trials	Indianapolis, Indiana	Jun 18, 2024	

=== Short course yards (25 yd pool) ===
Event	Time	Meet	Location	Date	Ref
50 yd freestyle	18.87	2024 SEC Swimming & Diving Championships	James E. Martin Aquatic Center — Auburn, AL	February 21, 2024	
100 yd freestyle	41.30	2024 SEC Swimming & Diving Championships	James E. Martin Aquatic Center — Auburn, AL	February 24, 2024	
200 yd freestyle	1:30.64	2024 SEC Swimming & Diving Championships	James E. Martin Aquatic Center — Auburn, AL	February 22, 2024	
