= Parkersburg South High School =

Location
- 1511 Blizzard Drive; Parkersburg, WV; Parkersburg, Wood, West Virginia, 26101; United States

Information
- School type: Public High School, Secondary - Public
- Motto: All Students Can and Will Learn At High Levels.
- Established: 1967
- School district: Wood County Schools
- Superintendent: Christie Willis
- CEEB code: 490987
- Principal: Maria Francisco
- Faculty: 157
- Grades: 9-12
- Enrollment: 1,384 (2023-24)
- Campus type: Urban/Suburb
- Colors: Navy, white, and scarlet
- Mascot: Patriot
- Nickname: South
- Feeder schools: Edison Junior High School; Blennerhassett Junior High School
- Website: www.woodcountyschoolswv.com/o/psh
- Last updated: 12/12/2025

Parkersburg South High School in Parkersburg, West Virginia, United States serves grades 9 through 12, and is part of the Wood County Schools. The school's colors are navy blue and white (with a touch of scarlet), and the mascot is a Patriot. The school's principal is Maria Francisco. As of the 2023-24 school year, the school has 1,384 students. Feeder schools are Edison Middle School and Blennerhassett Middle School.

== Academics ==
Parkersburg South High School offers a comprehensive curriculum with a wide range of courses, including Advanced Placement (AP) courses, honors courses, and vocational programs. Students have the opportunity to take courses in subjects such as English, math, science, social studies, foreign languages, music, art, and physical education. The school also offers career and technical education programs in areas such as business, healthcare, and technology.

== Athletics ==
The school offers a variety of sports programs, including football, basketball, baseball, softball, wrestling, track and field, tennis, crew, cross country, and disc golf.

== Erickson All Sports Facility ==
As one of the largest high schools in the state of West Virginia, Parkersburg South lacked a home stadium for many sporting events until a community effort begun in August 1993. A local businessman and philanthropist contributed of 18 acres (73,000 m^{2}) of land and $300,000. The Erickson All-Sports Facility is managed by the EASF Development Corporation and is home to Parkersburg South football, soccer, tennis, and track.

In 2025 The Erickson All Sports Facility began construction on several new projects on the compound

== Extracurricular activities ==
The school offers a variety of clubs and organizations, including academic clubs, athletic teams, music and theater groups, and service organizations. Some of the popular clubs and organizations include the National Honor Society, Student Council, Future Farmers of America, and the Marching Band.

== Notable alumni ==
- Steve Swisher, former Major League Baseball player
- Jay Wolfe, U.S. Senate candidate
- Chase Fieler, professional basketball player
- Kim Caldwell, women's college basketball coach
- Macguire McDuff, NCAA champion swimmer
- Daniel Poling, politician

== See also ==
- List of high schools in West Virginia
- Education in West Virginia
