= 1888 West Virginia gubernatorial election =

- November 6, 1888
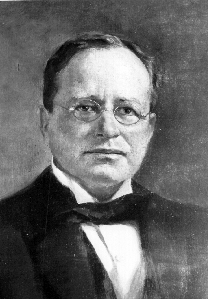

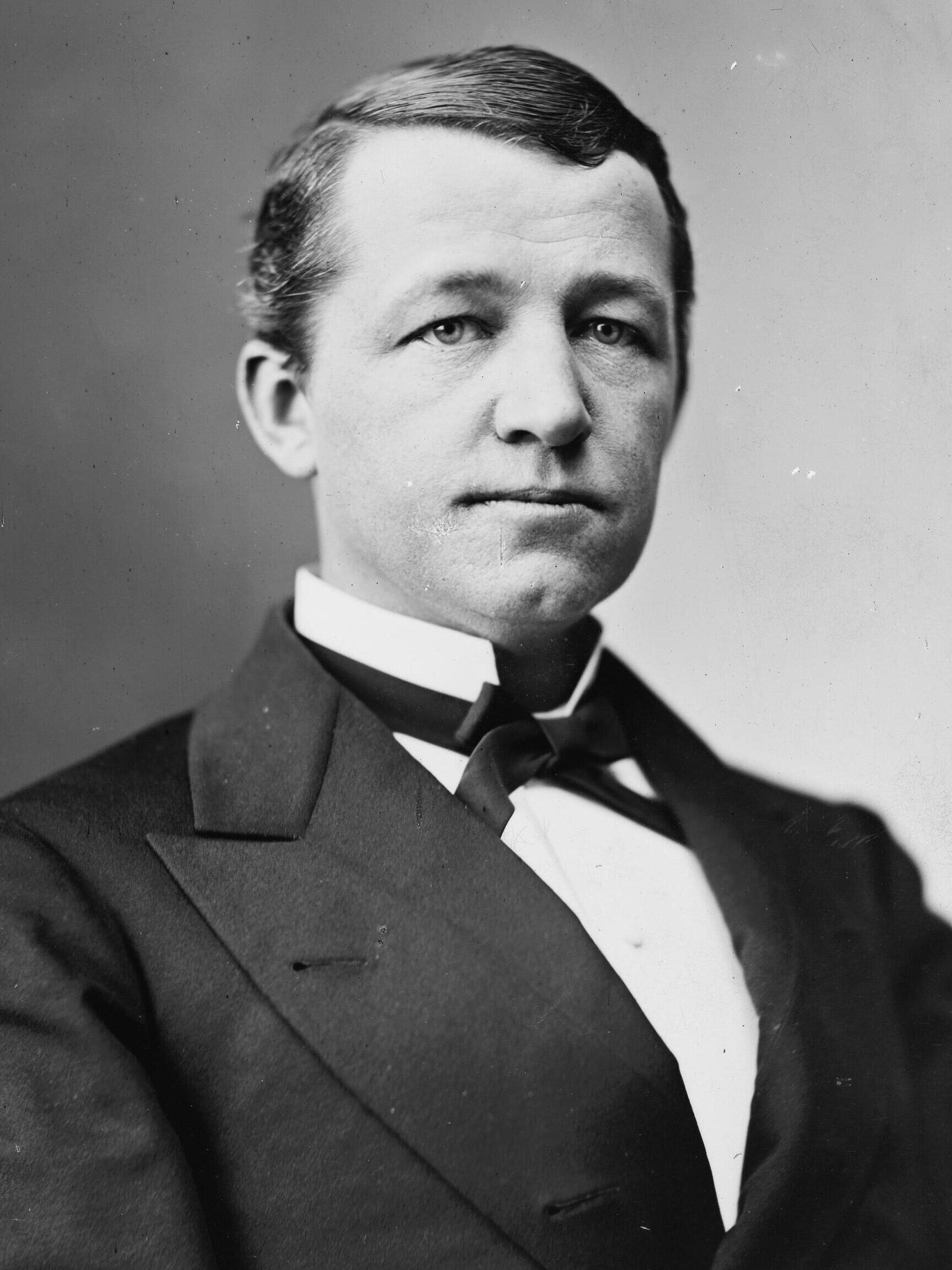
| Nominee | Aretas B. Fleming | Nathan Goff Jr. |
| Party | Democratic | Republican |
| Popular vote | 78,798 | 78,904 |
| Percentage | 49.21% | 49.27% |
- County results Fleming: 50–60% 60–70% 70–80% Goff: 50–60% 60–70% 70–80%
Governor before election
Emanuel Willis Wilson
Democratic
Elected Governor
Aretas B. Fleming
Democratic

The 1888 West Virginia gubernatorial election took place on November 6, 1888, to elect the governor of West Virginia.

The Supreme Court of Appeals of West Virginia ruled that outgoing governor Emmanuel Willis Wilson would remain governor; State Senate President Robert S. Carr had claimed authority until the Court reached its decision. In 1890, the Legislature agreed that Fleming had defeated Nathan Goff, Jr. As a result, Fleming did not assume the office until February 6, 1890.

This election was also the first time in West Virginia's history that an African-American ran for governor, with William H. Davis running under the Colored Independent Party.

== Results ==
West Virginia gubernatorial election, 1888
| Party | Candidate | Votes | % |
|---|---|---|---|
| Democratic | Aretas B. Fleming | 78,798 | 49.21 |
| Republican | Nathan Goff Jr. | 78,904 | 49.27 |
| Other | Others | 2,437 | 1.52 |
| Total votes | | 160,139 | 100 |
| Democratic hold | | | |
