= William A. MacCorkle =

American politician (1857–1930)

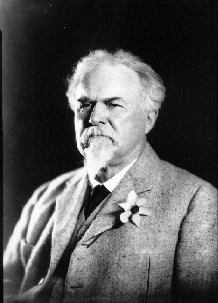

9th Governor of West Virginia
- In office March 4, 1893 – March 4, 1897
- Preceded by: Aretas B. Fleming
- Succeeded by: George W. Atkinson

Personal details
- Born: May 7, 1857 Lexington, Virginia
- Died: September 24, 1930 (aged 73) Charleston, West Virginia
- Party: Democratic
- Spouse: Belle Goshorn MacCorkle
- Profession: Politician

William Alexander MacCorkle (May 7, 1857 – September 24, 1930), was an American teacher, lawyer, prosecutor, the ninth governor of West Virginia and state legislator of West Virginia, and financier. His residence in Charleston, known as Sunrise, is listed on the National Register of Historic Places.

== Biography ==
He was born near Lexington, Virginia. After briefly teaching school in Pocahontas County, West Virginia, he attended Washington and Lee University in Lexington, Virginia. Returning to West Virginia, in 1879, he established a law practice in Charleston and also taught school. From 1880 to 1889, he served as the Kanawha County prosecuting attorney. In 1884 he married Belle Goshorn. MacCorkle possessed strong views regarding the Confederacy. On December 8, 1889, he struck U.S. Marshal W.J. White at the Ruffner Hotel in Charleston after the latter made a disparaging comment about former Confederate president Jefferson Davis.

In 1892, as the Democratic Party's candidate, he was elected governor of West Virginia. As governor, MacCorkle advocated increased funding for state institutions and improved transportation. Through an advertising program, he actively promoted the state's natural resources to attract industry. MacCorkle opposed the growing labor movement among coal miners and dispatched the state militia to break a strike.

MacCorkle addressed the Southern Conference On Race Problems in Montgomery, Alabama, on May 9, 1900. The address was entitled "The Negro and the Intelligence and Property Franchise." This address passionately set forth his opinions advocating for rights for African Americans.

After leaving office, MacCorkle returned to his Charleston law practice. In his numerous travels, he continued to publicize the state's resources. In 1910, he was elected to the West Virginia Senate. MacCorkle was also a founder and president of the Citizens National Bank, which later merged with the Charleston National Bank. He wrote an autobiography, The Recollections of Fifty Years, which was published in 1928. He died at his Charleston home, Sunrise, in 1930.

== Legacy ==
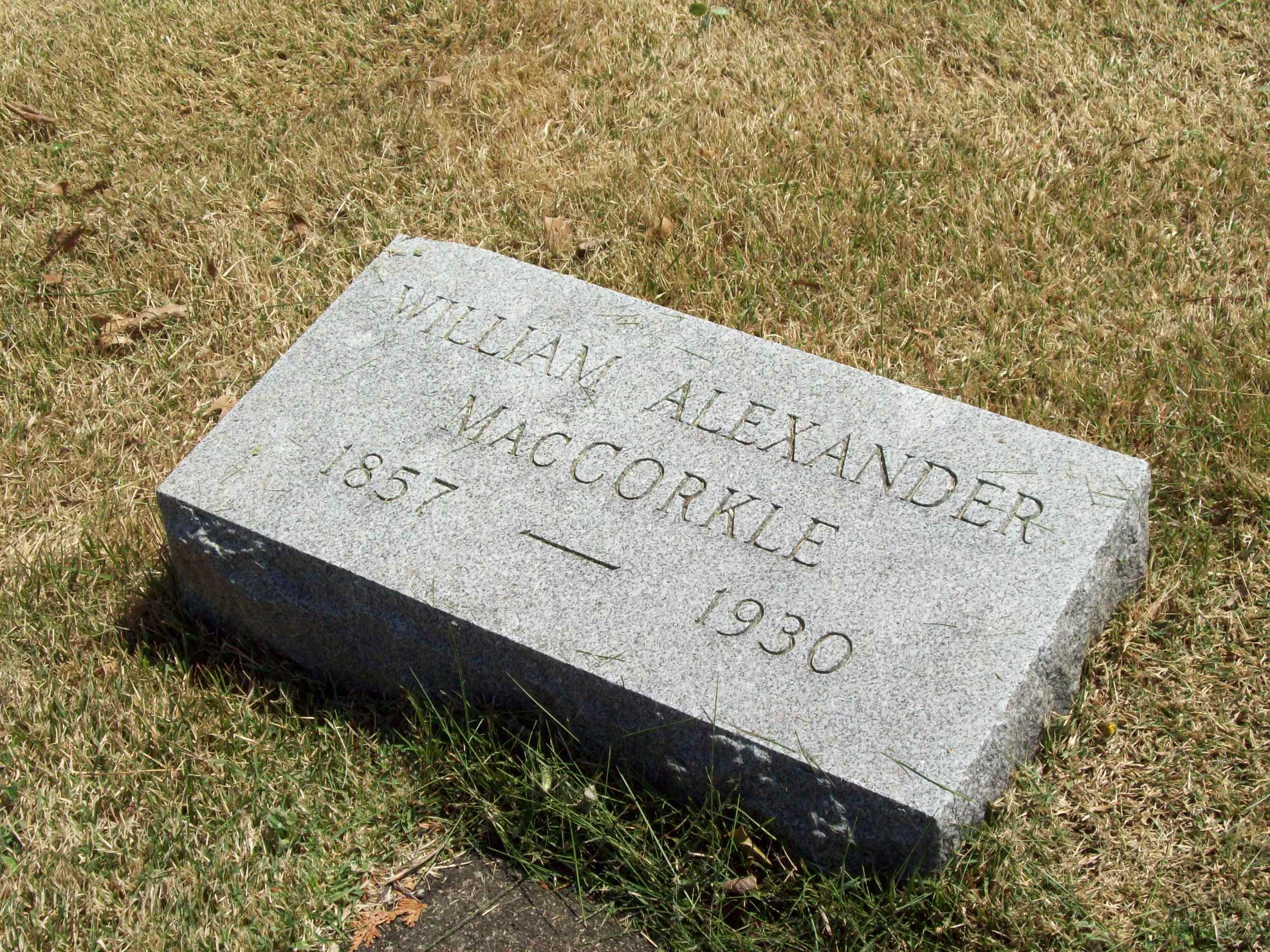
William A. MacCorkle grave, Spring Hill Cemetery, Charleston, WV, April 2009

MacCorkle's mansion, Sunrise, became home to a children's museum in the early 1960s. It was added to the National Register of Historic Places in 1974. The children's museum (now called Avampato Discovery Museum) was relocated to The Clay Center about two miles away in downtown Charleston in 2003. The Sunrise estate currently houses the law firm of Farmer Cline & Campbell PLLC.

In Charleston, a major arterial road, MacCorkle Avenue, was named for him and carries U.S. Route 60 through the area. His papers form a valuable research resource at the West Virginia Division of Culture and History, which maintains the MacCorkle Collection on their State History and Archives website.

Party political offices
| Preceded by Aretas B. Fleming | Democratic nominee for Governor of West Virginia; 1892 | Succeeded by Cornelius Clarkson Watts |
Political offices
| Preceded by Aretas B. Fleming | Governor of West Virginia; 1893–1897 | Succeeded by George W. Atkinson |
