= Emanuel Willis Wilson =

American politician (1844–1905)

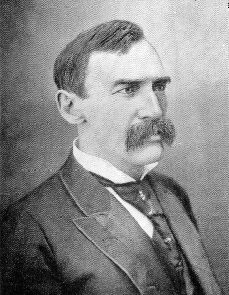

7th Governor of West Virginia
- In office March 4, 1885 – February 6, 1890
- Preceded by: Jacob B. Jackson
- Succeeded by: Aretas B. Fleming

13th Speaker of the West Virginia House of Delegates
- In office 1881–1883
- Preceded by: George H. Moffett
- Succeeded by: Joseph J. Woods

Personal details
- Born: August 11, 1844 Harpers Ferry, Virginia, U.S. (now West Virginia)
- Died: May 28, 1905 (aged 60) Charleston, West Virginia, U.S.
- Party: Democratic
- Spouse: Henrietta Cotton Wilson
- Occupation: Politician

Emanuel Willis Wilson (August 11, 1844 – May 28, 1905) was the seventh governor of West Virginia, serving from 1885 to 1890.

When the West Virginia Legislature disputed the election of 1888, both Governor Wilson and State Senate President Robert S. Carr claimed the right to sit as Governor until the dispute was resolved. The Supreme Court of Appeals of West Virginia ruled that Wilson should remain Governor. He left office on February 6, 1890, because the legislature had decided Aretas B. Fleming had defeated Nathan Goff Jr. After leaving the governor's office, Wilson had an unsuccessful bid for Congress.

Wilson was governor during the period of the Hatfield-McCoy feud. Devil Anse Hatfield named a son, Emanuel Willis Hatfield, born on February 10, 1888, for him.

He was married to Henrietta Cotton. He died on May 28, 1905.

== See also ==
- List of governors of West Virginia

Party political offices
Preceded by Jacob B. Jackson	Democratic nominee for Governor of West Virginia; 1884	Succeeded by Aretas B. Fleming
Political offices
Preceded by George H. Moffett	Speaker of the West Virginia House of Delegates; 1881–1883	Succeeded by Joseph J. Woods
Preceded by Jacob B. Jackson	Governor of West Virginia; 1885–1890	Succeeded by Aretas B. Fleming
