= John Jay Jackson Jr. =

American judge (1824–1907)

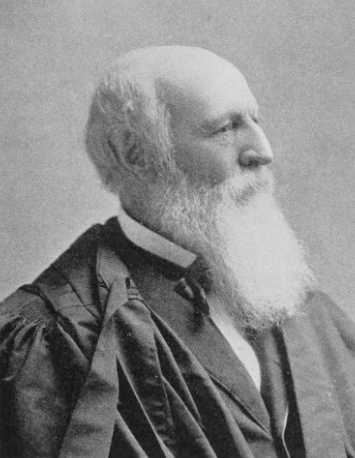
- The "Iron Judge" of West Virginia, c. 1903

Judge of the United States District Court for the Northern District of West Virginia
- In office July 1, 1901 – March 15, 1905
- Appointed by: operation of law
- Preceded by: Seat established by 31 Stat. 736
- Succeeded by: Alston G. Dayton

Judge of the United States District Court for the District of West Virginia
- In office June 11, 1864 – July 1, 1901
- Appointed by: operation of law
- Preceded by: Seat established by 13 Stat. 124
- Succeeded by: Seat abolished

Judge of the United States District Court for the Western District of Virginia
- In office August 3, 1861 – June 11, 1864
- Appointed by: Abraham Lincoln
- Preceded by: John White Brockenbrough
- Succeeded by: Seat abolished

Member of the Virginia House of Delegates from Wood County
- In office January 1, 1852 – December 2, 1855
- Preceded by: William L. Jackson
- Succeeded by: Arthur I. Boreman

Personal details
- Born: John Jay Jackson Jr. August 4, 1824 Parkersburg, Virginia (now West Virginia)
- Died: September 2, 1907 (aged 83) Atlantic City, New Jersey
- Relatives: Jacob B. Jackson (brother); James M. Jackson (brother); Stonewall Jackson (cousin); John G. Jackson (grandfather); George Jackson (great-grandfather)
- Education: Princeton University read law

John Jay Jackson Jr. (August 4, 1824 – September 2, 1907) was an American lawyer, Whig politician, United States District Judge (initially of the United States District Court for the Western District of Virginia) and, later, the first judge of the United States District Court for the District of West Virginia. He ended his career as the first judge of the United States District Court for the Northern District of West Virginia.

== Early life and education ==
Born on August 4, 1824, in Parkersburg, Virginia (now West Virginia), Jackson's family included several generations of lawyers, politicians and judges. His grandfather, Judge John G. Jackson, who died shortly after young John J. Jackson Jr.'s birth, had been a U.S. Congressman as well as U.S. District Judge for the Western District of Virginia. Young John J. Jackson Jr. received a private education near home, then traveled north to attend the College of New Jersey (now Princeton University), from which he graduated in 1845. He then read law and was admitted to the Virginia bar in 1847.

== Legal and political career ==
Jackson began his private legal practice in Wirt County, Virginia (now West Virginia) from 1847 to 1848. Local judges appointed Jackson as the first Wirt County commonwealth attorney (prosecutor) in 1848, the year the county was established from portions of Wood County and Jackson County. The following year his father's friend Judge David A. McComas appointed Jackson Jr. as the commonwealth attorney for more populated Ritchie County (which also became West Virginia in his lifetime and had been split from Wood County in 1843), where he served 1849 until 1850. Residents of Wood county operated considerable businesses in both counties, as well as speculated in land and other resources; the Jackson family had bought land near Harrisville (the Ritchie county seat) in connection with James B. Blair and in Wirt county near the Little Kanawha River in conjunction with William P. Rathbone and his son in law Peter G. Van Winkle. Probably Jackson continued to reside at home (Parkersburg being the Wood county seat), helped his father attend the family's considerable business interests, and only traveled to the outlying counties when court was in session.

Jackson Jr. was appointed the Commonwealth attorney for Wood County and served from 1850 to 1851, when the post became elective under the new state constitution. When Jackson resumed his private legal practice, Wood County voters elected (and reelected) him as one of their delegates in the Virginia House of Delegates. Jackson served part-time from 1852 to 1855, succeeding his cousin and business associate William Lowther Jackson (a future Confederate General) and being succeeded by Arthur I. Boreman (who would become West Virginia's first Governor). After leaving the legislature as 1855 closed, Jackson Jr. concentrated on his family's real estate and other business interests (which boomed after the discovery of oil at Burning Spring in Wirt County), as well as his private legal practice in Parkersburg until 1861.

== Federal judicial service ==
On July 26, 1861, President Abraham Lincoln nominated Jackson to a seat on the United States District Court for the Western District of Virginia vacated by Judge John White Brockenbrough, who had sided with Virginia's secessionists. Jackson's father had opposed secession as well as attended the Wheeling Convention in May, 1861 (following Virginia's secession vote), which ultimately led to West Virginia's statehood in 1863. Meanwhile, the United States Senate confirmed Judge Jackson Jr's appointment on August 3, 1861, and he received his commission the same day. Following West Virginia's secession from Virginia and admission to the Union on June 20, 1863, Jackson was reassigned by operation of law to the United States District Court for the District of West Virginia on June 11, 1864, the new seat having been authorized by 13 Stat. 124. Jackson was reassigned by operation of law to the United States District Court for the Northern District of West Virginia on July 1, 1901, the new court having been authorized by 31 Stat. 736. Judge Jackson retired on March 15, 1905, ending his federal service.

It has been said that Mother Jones, while under trial for actions related to organizing a coal miner's union, claimed that Jackson had stolen his position as judge from his father, who had the same name. Allegedly, when Lincoln appointed Jackson, he did not specify whether the appointment was for Jackson Sr. or Jackson Jr., and with Jackson Sr. away on business Jackson Jr. took the position for himself.

=== Notable case ===
Jackson ruled in 1870 that West Virginia's ex-Confederates were eligible to vote under the Fifteenth Amendment, which had profound effects on the polity in West Virginia.

=== Tenure ===
Because Jackson had served from before the creation of the District of West Virginia until after its subdivision, Jackson was the only Judge to ever sit on the United States District Court for the District of West Virginia. Having served for nearly forty-four years, including over forty years in the federal courts in West Virginia, Jackson was known as "the Iron Judge". Jackson became the longest-serving judge appointed by Lincoln.

== Death ==
Jackson died on September 2, 1907, in Atlantic City, New Jersey.

== Family ==
Jackson's father, General John Jay Jackson of Wood County attended the Wheeling Convention on West Virginia statehood. Jackson's brother Jacob B. Jackson served as Governor of West Virginia and his other brother was Circuit Judge and Congressman James M. Jackson. Confederate General Stonewall Jackson was a cousin. His grandfather, John G. Jackson, preceded him as Judge of the United States District Court for the Western District of Virginia. His great-grandfathers included George Jackson. The Jackson Memorial Fountain at Parkersburg is dedicated to the Jackson family.

== See also ==
- List of United States federal judges by longevity of service

Legal offices
| Preceded by John White Brockenbrough | Judge of the United States District Court for the Western District of Virginia; 1861–1864 | Succeeded by Seat abolished |
| Preceded by Seat established by 13 Stat. 124 | Judge of the United States District Court for the District of West Virginia; 1864–1901 | Succeeded by Seat abolished |
| Preceded by Seat established by 31 Stat. 736 | Judge of the United States District Court for the Northern District of West Virginia; 1901–1905 | Succeeded by Alston G. Dayton |
