= Jacob B. Jackson =

American politician (1829–1893)

Jacob Beeson Jackson
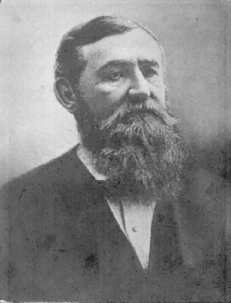

6th Governor of West Virginia
- In office March 4, 1881 – March 4, 1885
- Preceded by: Henry M. Mathews
- Succeeded by: Emanuel Willis Wilson

Personal details
- Born: April 6, 1829 Parkersburg, Virginia (now West Virginia)
- Died: December 11, 1893 (aged 64) Parkersburg, West Virginia
- Party: Democratic
- Spouse: Maria Willard Jackson
- Profession: Politician

Jacob Beeson Jackson (April 6, 1829 – December 11, 1893) was the sixth governor of West Virginia from 1881 to 1885. In 1855, he married Maria Willard. In his biography it is stated that he was a cousin of Stonewall Jackson. An examination of their family trees shows that the two men were second cousins once removed. He was also a 4th-cousin-once-removed to William Wirt Woodson who was Stonewall Jackson's half brother.

He was a son of General John Jay Jackson and his brothers were Federal Judge John Jay Jackson, Jr. and Circuit Judge and Congressman James M. Jackson. The Jackson Memorial Fountain at Parkersburg, West Virginia is dedicated to the Jackson family.

Party political offices
Preceded by Henry M. Mathews	Democratic nominee for Governor of West Virginia; 1880	Succeeded by Emanuel Willis Wilson
Political offices
Preceded by Henry M. Mathews	Governor of West Virginia; 1881–1885	Succeeded by Emanuel Willis Wilson
