= First Lady of West Virginia =

Wives of governors of the U.S. state of West Virginia

- Seal of the State of West Virginia
- Incumbent; Denise Morrisey since January 13, 2025
- Residence: Governor's Mansion
- Inaugural holder: Laurane Tanner Boreman
- Formation: 1864; 162 years ago
- Website: Official website

The spouse of the Governor of West Virginia is given an honorary position, styled as First Lady or First Gentleman of the State of West Virginia. To date there have been no female governors of the State of West Virginia, and all first spouses have been first ladies.

The current first lady of West Virginia is Denise Morrisey, the wife of incumbent Governor Patrick Morrisey.

== Role ==
The position of the first lady is not an elected one, carries no official duties, and receives no salary. However, the first lady holds a highly visible position in state government. Since 1893, the role of the first lady includes serving the host of the West Virginia Governor's Mansion. She organizes and attends official ceremonies and functions of state either along with, or in place of, the governor. It is common for the governor's spouse to select specific, non-political, causes to promote.

== List ==
	Picture	Name	Took office	Left office	Spouse	Notes
1		Laurane Tanner Bullock Boreman	1864	1869	Arthur I. Boreman	
2		Mary Ireland Farnsworth	1869	1869	Daniel D. T. Farnsworth	Served only five days in office as First Lady
3		Sarah Clotworthy Stevenson	1869	1871	William E. Stevenson	
4		Jane Baird Jacob	1871	1877	John J. Jacob	
5		Lucy Fry Mathews	1877	1881	Henry M. Mathews	
6		Maria Willard Jackson	1881	1885	Jacob B. Jackson	
7		Henrietta Cotton Wilson	1885	1890	Emanuel Willis Wilson	
8		Carrie Watson Fleming	1890	1893	Aretas B. Fleming	
9		Belle Goshorn MacCorkle	1893	1897	William A. MacCorkle	
10		Myra Horner Camden Atkinson	1897	1901	George W. Atkinson	
11		Agnes Ward White	1901	1905	Albert B. White	
12		Maude Brown Dawson	1905	1909	William M. O. Dawson	First governor's wife who was born in West Virginia after statehood
13		Mary Miller Glasscock	1909	1913	William E. Glasscock	
14		Carrie Bronson Hatfield	1913	1917	Henry D. Hatfield	
15		Edna Brady Cornwell	1917	1921	John J. Cornwell	
16		Alma Bennett Morgan	1921	1925	Ephraim F. Morgan	While in office, actively campaigned for women's suffrage in the United States
17		Roxie C. Bailey Gore	1925	1928	Howard Mason Gore	Died in 1907, years before husband's term in office
18		Bertie Ison Martin Conley	1929	1933	William G. Conley	
19		Edna Hall Scott Kump	1933	1937	Herman G. Kump	
20		Isabel Wood Holt	1937	1941	Homer A. Holt	
21		Alberta Ramage Neely	1941	1945	Matthew M. Neely	
22		Nancy Massie Meadows	1945	1949	Clarence W. Meadows	
23		Lee Hawse Patteson	1949	1953	Okey Patteson	Obtained a pilot's license while serving as First Lady
24		Valerie Allen Marland	1953	1957	William C. Marland	
25		Hovah Hall Underwood	1957	1961	Cecil H. Underwood	25th and 33rd First Lady of West Virginia during husband's non-consecutive terms
26		Opal Wilcox Barron	1961	1965	William Wallace Barron	
27		Mary Alice Tieche Smith	1965	1969	Hulett C. Smith	
28		Shelley Riley Moore	1969	1977	Arch A. Moore Jr.	28th and 30th First Lady of West Virginia during husband's non-consecutive terms. Mother of U.S. Senator Shelley Moore Capito
29		Sharon Percy Rockefeller	1977	1985	Jay Rockefeller	Later was chief executive officer of WETA-TV in Washington, D.C., chairwoman of the Corporation for Public Broadcasting, and chairperson of the National Gallery of Art
30		Shelley Riley Moore	1985	1989	Arch A. Moore Jr.	
31		Dee Caperton Kessel	1989	1989	Gaston Caperton	Divorced husband while in office. Also was a member of the West Virginia House of Delegates and ran for West Virginia State Treasurer in 1990
32		Rachael Worby	1990	1997	Gaston Caperton	Married Governor Capterton while in office. Conductor who currently serves as the Artistic Director, Conductor and Founder of MUSE/IQUE
33		Hovah Hall Underwood	1997	2001	Cecil H. Underwood	
34		Sandra Casber Wise			Bob Wise	
35		Gayle Conelly Manchin	2005	2010	Joe Manchin	Was President of the West Virginia Board of Education, West Virginia Secretary of Education and the Arts, and Federal Co-Chair of the Appalachian Regional Commission
36		Joanne Tomblin	2011	2017	Earl Ray Tomblin	
37		Cathy Justice	2017	2025	Jim Justice	
38		Denise Morrisey	2025	Incumbent	Patrick Morrisey	

== See also ==
- List of governors of West Virginia
