= Boyer (disambiguation) =

Boyer is a surname.

Boyer may also refer to:

== Places ==
=== Antarctica ===
- Mount Boyer, Ellsworth Land
- Boyer Spur, Palmer Land
- Boyer Glacier, Victoria Land
- Boyer Bluff, in the Churchill Mountains
- Boyer Rocks

=== Canada ===
- Boyer River (Alberta)
- Boyer River (Quebec)
- Boyer Strait, Nunavut
- Boyer 164, an Indian reserve in Alberta

=== France ===
- Boyer, Loire, in the Loire département of France
- Boyer, Saône-et-Loire, in the Saône-et-Loire département of France

=== United States ===
- Boyer, Iowa, an unincorporated community
- Boyer Township, Crawford County, Iowa
- Boyer, Mississippi, an unincorporated community
- Boyer, Missouri, an unincorporated community
- Boyer, Nevada, a ghost town
- Boyers, Pennsylvania, an unincorporated village
- Boyertown, Pennsylvania, a borough
- Boyer, West Virginia, an unincorporated community
- Boyer River, a tributary of the Missouri River in Iowa

=== Elsewhere ===
- Boyer, Tasmania, Australia
- 1215 Boyer, an asteroid

== Other uses ==
- an alternative term for a bojort, a type of sailing vessel
- Boyer Oval, a sports venue in New Norfolk, Tasmania
- Boyer College of Music and Dance, Temple University, Philadelphia, Pennsylvania, United States
- Boyer Gallery, a folk art museum in Belleville, Kansas, United States
- Boyer rifle, a type of flintlock rifle invented around 1800
- Boyer Glover, 18th century watch and clock maker in London
- Boyer–Lindquist coordinates
- Boyer–Moore string-search algorithm
- Boyer (candy company), a candy manufacturer in Altoona, Pennsylvania, United States

== See also ==
- Boyer Brothers, a candy company in Altoona, Pennsylvania, United States
