= 1990 West Virginia State Treasurer special election =

- November 6, 1990
Nominee	Larrie Bailey	Elvin F. Martin
Party	Democratic	Republican
Popular vote	226,626	138,266
Percentage	62.11%	37.89%
- County results Bailey: 50–60% 60–70% 70–80% 80–90% Martin: 50–60% 60–70%
State Treasurer before election
Thomas E. Loehr
Democratic
Elected State Treasurer
Larrie Bailey
Democratic

The 1990 West Virginia State Treasurer special election took place on November 6, 1990, to elect the West Virginia State Treasurer.

The election was held to complete the unexpired term of A. James Manchin, who resigned on July 9, 1989 amid a controversy over bad investments. That same day, Democratic governor Gaston Caperton appointed Democratic State Senator of the 2nd district Thomas E. Loehr to fill the vacancy. Loehr chose not to contest the election.

Democratic nominee and former State Treasurer Larrie Bailey won the election, beating Republican nominee and certified public accountant Elvin F. Martin, 62.1% to 37.9%

== Democratic primary ==
=== Candidates ===
==== Nominee ====
- Larrie Bailey, former state treasurer (1977–1985)

==== Eliminated in primary ====
- Dee Kessel Caperton, ex-wife of governor Gaston Caperton and former member of the West Virginia House of Delegates
- Marie Prezioso, investment banker
- Eugene A. Knotts, Wood County assessor

==== Declined ====
- Thomas E. Loehr, incumbent state treasurer

=== Results ===
May 8, 1990 Democratic primary
Party	Candidate	Votes	%
Democratic	Larrie Bailey	90,086	38.96%
Democratic	Dee Kessel Caperton	75,330	32.57%
Democratic	Marie Prezioso	38,471	16.64%
Democratic	Eugene A. Knotts	27,366	11.83%
Total votes		231,253	100.00%

== Republican primary ==
=== Candidates ===
==== Nominee ====
- Elvin F. Martin, certified public accountant

=== Results ===
May 8, 1990 Republican primary
Party	Candidate	Votes	%
Republican	Elvin F. Martin	66,231	100.00%
Total votes		66,231	100.00%

== General election ==
=== Results ===
1990 West Virginia State Treasurer special election
Party	Candidate	Votes	%
Democratic	Larrie Bailey	226,626	62.11%
Republican	Elvin F. Martin	138,266	37.89%
Total votes		364,892	100.00%
Democratic hold			
