= Governor Wise =

Governor Wise may refer to:

- Bob Wise (born 1948), 33rd Governor of West Virginia
- Henry A. Wise (1806–1876), 33rd Governor of Virginia
