= 1904 West Virginia gubernatorial election =

- November 8, 1904
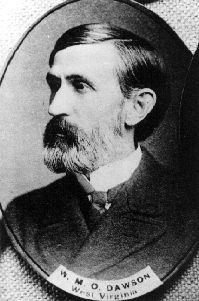

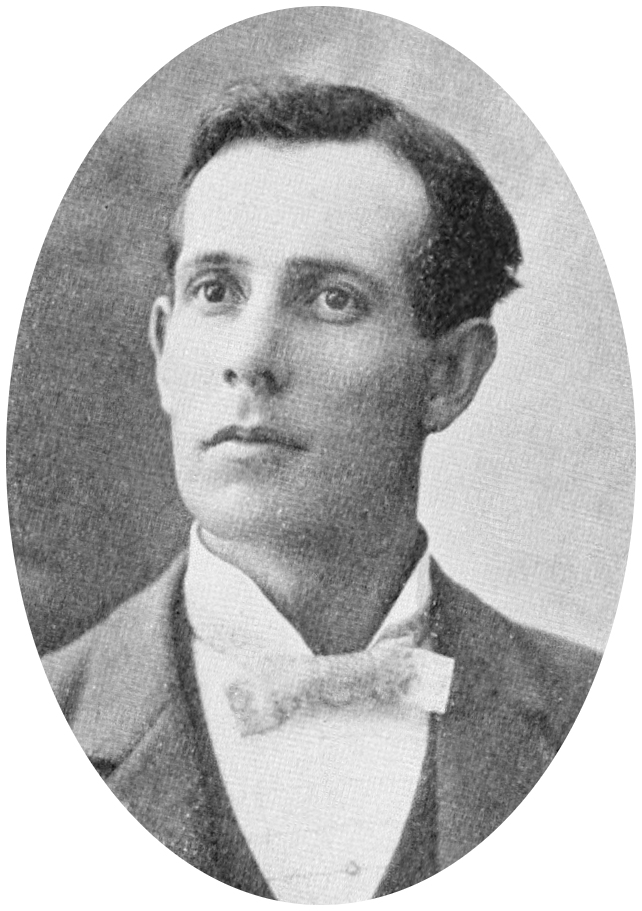
Nominee	William M. O. Dawson	John J. Cornwell
Party	Republican	Democratic
Popular vote	121,540	112,538
Percentage	50.78%	47.02%
- County results Dawson: 40–50% 50–60% 60–70% 70–80% Cornwell: 40–50% 50–60% 60–70% 70–80%
Governor before election
Albert B. White
Republican
Elected Governor
William M. O. Dawson
Republican

The 1904 West Virginia gubernatorial election took place on November 8, 1904, to elect the governor of West Virginia.

== Results ==
West Virginia gubernatorial election, 1904
Party	Candidate	Votes	%
Republican	William M. O. Dawson	121,540	50.78
Democratic	John J. Cornwell	112,538	47.02
Prohibition	Joseph W. Bedford	3,999	1.67
Socialist	J. M. Eskey	1,279	0.53
Total votes		239,356	100
Republican hold			
