= Sharon Percy Rockefeller =

American politician (born 1944)

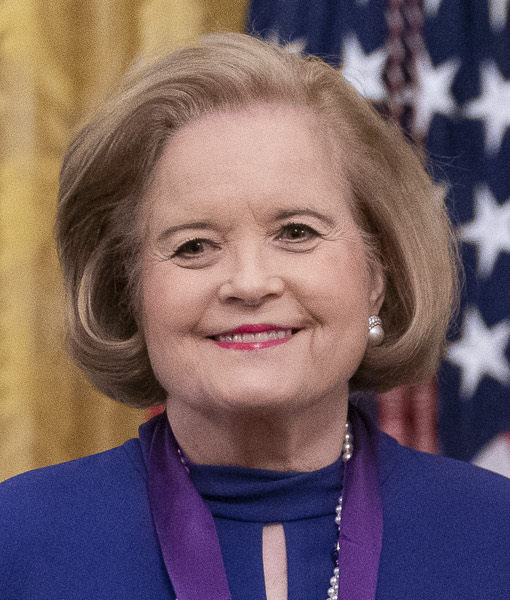
- Rockefeller in 2019

First Lady of West Virginia
- In role January 17, 1977 – January 14, 1985
- Governor: Jay Rockefeller
- Preceded by: Shelley Riley Moore
- Succeeded by: Shelley Riley Moore

Personal details
- Born: Sharon Lee Percy; December 10, 1944 (age 81) Oakland, California, U.S.
- Spouse: John Davison Rockefeller IV (m. 1967; died 2026)
- Children: 4, including Valerie and Justin
- Parent(s): Charles Harting Percy; Jeanne Valerie Dickerson
- Occupation: Chief executive officer of WETA-TV

Sharon Lee Percy Rockefeller (born December 10, 1944) is an American public figure and nonprofit executive who is the widow of former West Virginia Senator John Davison "Jay" Rockefeller IV. She served as that state's First Lady from 1977 to 1985 during her husband’s terms as governor.

Rockefeller was a member of the board of directors of the Corporation for Public Broadcasting for 12 years, serving four years as its chair. She has been president and chief executive officer of WETA in Washington, D.C. since 1989. She received a National Medal of Arts in 2019 for her leadership and advocacy in the arts and public media.

== Life ==
Rockefeller was born in Oakland, California, on December 10, 1944, a twin daughter of Senator Charles Harting Percy (1919–2011) and Jeanne Valerie Dickerson, who died in 1947. She earned a Bachelor's degree at Stanford University and later studied at Morris Harvey College and West Virginia Wesleyan College. Her twin sister Valerie was murdered in 1966 at the family home by a mysterious intruder.

In 1967, she married John Davison "Jay" Rockefeller IV (born 1937). He is the son of John Davison Rockefeller III (1906–1978) and Blanchette Ferry Hooker (1909–1992) and is part of the famous Rockefeller family. She and her husband have four children and seven grandchildren.

In 2005, she was diagnosed with colon cancer and underwent chemotherapy and radiation therapy. Her cancer has since metastasized in the bones. Her experience prompted her to convince filmmaker Ken Burns to produce the 2015 documentary Cancer: The Emperor of All Maladies. It is adapted from the book of the same name by Siddhartha Mukherjee.

On November 21, 2019, she was awarded the National Medal of Arts by then-U.S. President Donald Trump.

The Rockefellers live in the Northwest quadrant of Washington, DC and retain a permanent residence in Charleston, West Virginia.

== Career ==
As First Lady of West Virginia, Rockefeller promoted the Public Broadcasting Service; helped establish a centralized system to assist mentally disabled children; and founded Mountain Artisans, a quilting business for low-income artisans. She also campaigned to bring down utility costs and to improve care for the elderly.

After her husband was elected to the United States Senate in 1985, she became chief executive officer of WETA-TV in Washington, D.C. She later became chairwoman of the Corporation for Public Broadcasting.

She is a former member of the Steering Committee of the Bilderberg Group. She has also been the chairperson of the National Gallery of Art.

Honorary titles
Preceded by Shelley Riley Moore	First Lady of West Virginia; 1977 – 1985	Succeeded by Shelley Riley Moore
