= Mohammad Ali Taheri =

Founder of Erfan-e-Halgheh

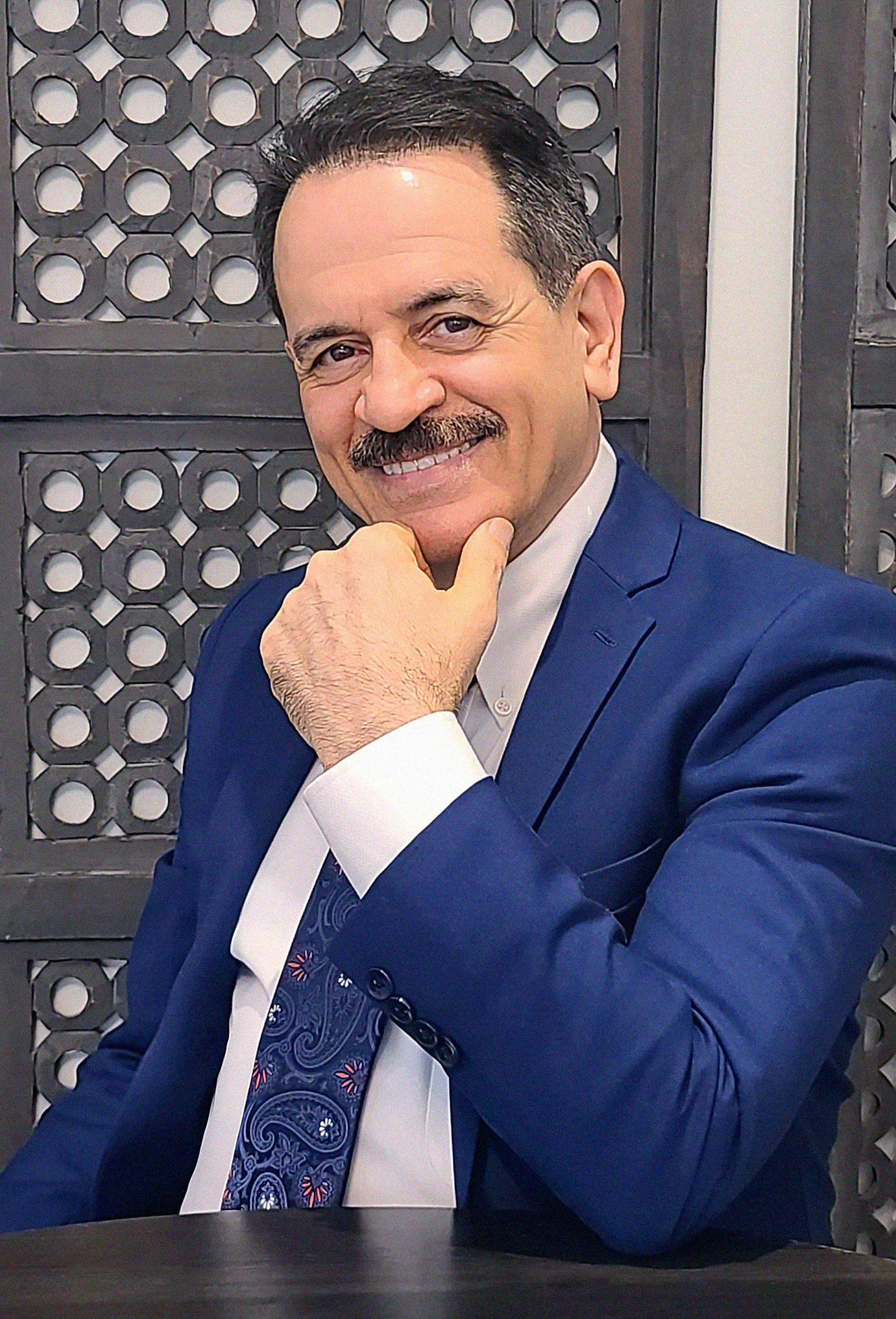
- Born: March 21, 1956 (age 70); Kermanshah, Iran
- Other name: Master Taheri
- Occupation: Founder of a spiritual group
- Known for: Erfan-e-Halgheh
- Spouse: Ziba Mohamadian
- Children: 2

Mohammad Ali Taheri (Persian: محمد علی طاهری; born 1956, in Kermanshah, Iran) is an alternative medicine practitioner who is the founder of Erfan-e-Halgheh, also called Interuniversal Mysticism, a version of Iranian mysticism Irfan. He is also the founder of the Erfan Halghe Cultural Institute.

Taheri has founded two pseudo-scientific complementary medicine treatments Faradarmani and Psymentology and, according to him, has been honored with doctorate degrees by alternative medicine universities for his research.

He is currently based in Canada after the grant of asylum by the Government of Canada.

== Life ==
=== Early years ===
Mohammad Ali Taheri was born in 1956 in Kermanshah, Iran and received his primary education from his hometown. Later, they moved to Tehran for better opportunities.

Later, he went to Turkey where he studied briefly at the Middle East Technical University but did not get any degree.

Upon his return to Iran, he founded an engineering firm, Tiva Kian Engineering and Design Company, and designed small machines for use in mushroom production and flour factories.

=== Erfan-e-Halgheh ===
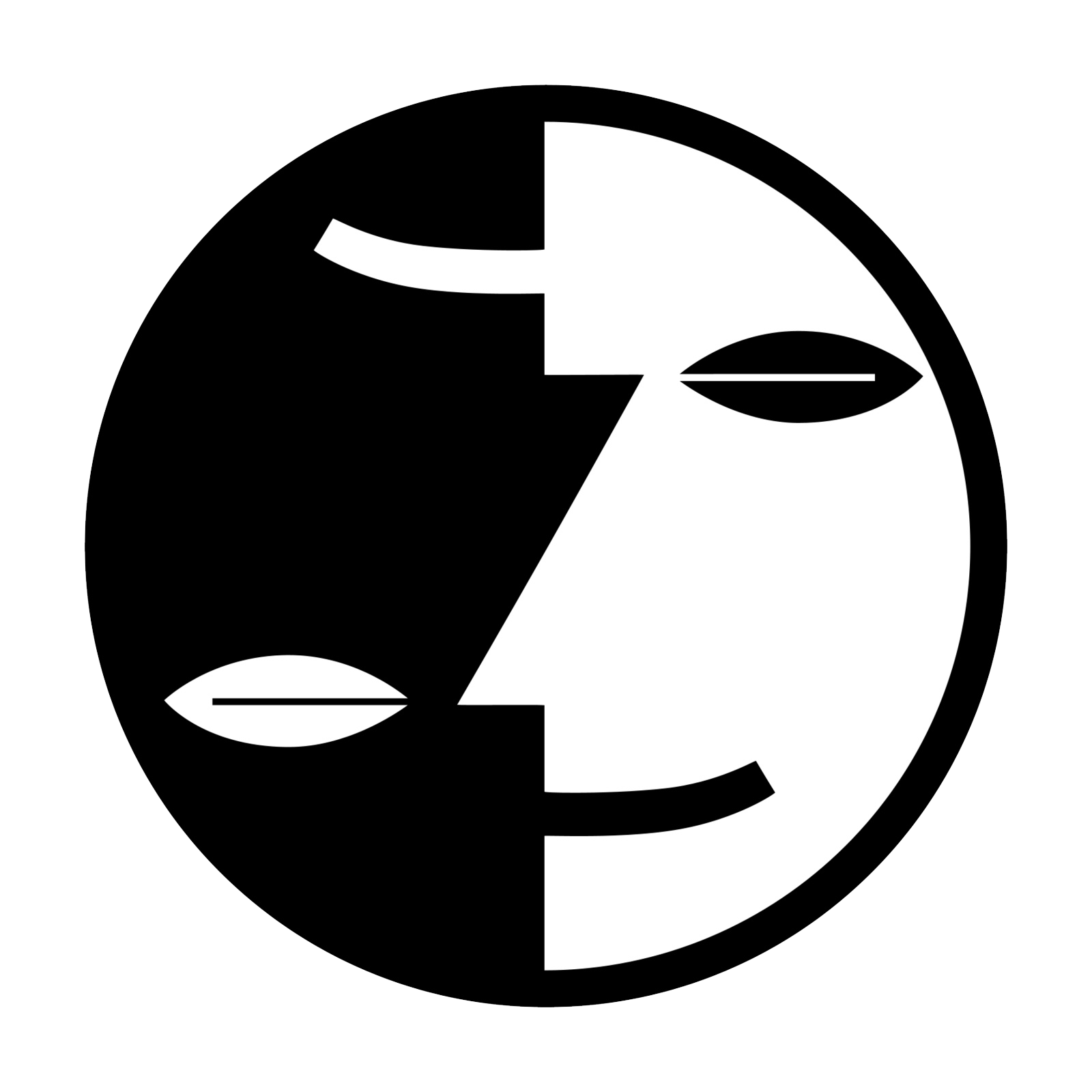
Erfan-e-Halgheh logo

According to Taheri, he has never followed any specific Sufi path or particular religion. He used to find answers to his questions through books and documents. He also used to meditate deeply.

During his self-study of cosmology, he began to believe that science and spirituality can converge in a single quest. Therefore, he proposed two ways to heal exclusively based on a path of "self-understanding" called Faradarmani and Psymentology.

In the 2000s, he founded Erfan-e-Halgheh (Circle of Mysticism), an arts and culture institute located in Tehran, which promotes spiritual healing concepts. It is part of Inter-universal Mysticism, a spiritual movement or school of thought, which he started about forty years ago to promote mental wellness and physical health. though new-age practices The movement became wildly popular in urban centers of Iran. At its peak, the movement had more than two million followers.

=== Teachings ===
Taheri initially started teaching about his knowledge to his friends and family in private. Later, after developing Erfan-e-Halgheh, he publicized his knowledge by teaching it with structured lessons. Initially, classes were small with few students. In 2001, classes were transferred to the official institution and later at University of Tehran, a top-ranked university in Iran. Meanwhile, Taheri was also giving interviews to further dissipate his knowledge.

In the start, Erfan-e-Halgheh was designed by him to be studied in six levels, but later two more levels were added to teach the subject in detail. Each level lasted six weeks with one four-hour each week. In level one, students were taught about Faradarmani which is used to heal different diseases and its purpose is to get acquaintance with divine intelligence in practical form. In Erfan-e-Halgheh, it is a first step on the spiritual development path.

Later, Taheri also started to teach Faradarmani and Psymentology at the institute he founded in 2006. Classes overwhelmed by students were held where everything was videotaped. He also wrote manuals and guides which were released with the official license of the Iranian Government. They won dozens of awards and acknowledgments in their field.

He has also taught alternative medicine and alternative therapies at the University of Tehran.

In 2010, he has to stop his teachings, when his popularity was at the peak, due to his arrest by the government.

=== Imprisonment, trial and release, 2010–2019 ===
In 2009, a group linked to the Iranian Revolutionary Guard Corps (IRGC) alarmed by his rising popularity and called it a threat to the national security. Classes filled with thousand of students were not considered safe.

A dissident spiritualist, Taheri was arrested by the Revolutionary Guards Intelligence Service in 2010 on charges of acting against national security. He was held in solitary confinement for 67 days. Before his arrest, he was free to deliver public lectures held at the Tehran University and publish books without any restrictions.

On May 4, 2011, Taheri was again arrested and tried under charges of “touching the wrists of female patients,” “blasphemy,” “producing and distributing audio-visual material,” “interfering in medical science,” “earning illegitimate funds,” and “distribution of audio-visual products and use of academic titles.” On October 30, 2011, he was sentenced to 74 lashes, a fine, and imprisonment.

Taheri was interrogated again in the summer of 2014 on charges of corruption on earth, and was eventually sentenced to death in court in May 2015. The UN high commissioner for Human Rights called this death sentence an “absolute outrage”. His sentence was annulled later the same year.

He was due to be released on February 7, 2016, after serving a full five-year sentence and paying the fine, but was prevented from being released on new charges being brought.

In August 2017, Islamic Revolutionary Court, presided over by Judge Ahmadzadeh, convicted Taheri on charges of corruption on earth; this conviction was overturned by Branch 33 of the Supreme Court for the second time. In September 2017, this second sentence and related arrests of his followers was condemned by the US Department of State spokesperson Heather Nauert. Nauert said that the alleged charges are against Iran's commitment to human rights and urged Iranian authorities to reverse the conviction and death sentence.

In August 2018, he was charged with corruption on earth for the third time by Judge Abolqasim Salavati in Branch 15 of the Revolutionary Court on a charge of five years' imprisonment; this charge should have been re-examined by the appeals court, but this never took place.

In September 2018, Taheri was charged again with apostasy. In a letter to Ahmad Shahid, a former UN human rights rapporteur for Iran, Taheri reported that he had been forced to fabricate confessions through psychological pressure and torture by IRGC interrogators.

==== Prisoner of conscience ====
In October 2018, Vice-Chair of the United States Commission on International Religious Freedom, Gayle Conelly Manchin, adopted Mohammad Ali Taheri as a religious prisoner of conscience which is part of USCIRF's Religious Prisoners of Conscience Project.

==== Campaign to release Taheri ====
In 2012, his mother left Iran and moved to Canada to start a campaign for the release of Taheri with help of human rights activists.

In August 2015, sit-ins were held by Taheri's students in Tehran and Qom and demanded to overturn his death sentence. Protests were also held in twenty cities around the world, including Edmonton, calling for his release from the prison.

In October 2016, more than thirty thousand people in Canada demanded the release of Mohammad Ali Taheri through petitions and mailboxes.

United Nation Human Rights condemned Taheri's imprisonment many times in its reports during his arrest period.

==== Release and exile ====
Taheri, in a letter to the Iranian president on January 13, 2019, called for the removal of his Iranian citizenship in protest against injustice.

In April 2019, he was released after seven and a half years of his last arrest. After his release, he left Iran and sought and was subsequently granted asylum in Canada on March 8, 2020.

=== Family ===
Taheri is married and the couple has two children. Taheri' mother, Ezat Taheri, and sister, Azardokht Taheri, are based in Canada.

== Awards and honors ==
In March 2011, he received honorary doctorate degree from the president of the University of Traditional Medicine of Armenia for founding, the Iranian complementary medicine, Faradarmani.

He claims he has also received gold medals and certificates by alternative medicine institutes from Belgium, Romania, Russia, and South Korea for his work and research.

== Works ==
Taheri has written dozens of books and more than twenty-five articles on his research work. Several of them were published in Iran with permission from the Ministry of Culture and Islamic Guidance, Iran. Some of his books have also been published in Armenia.

His books are widely read in Iran. For example, his book, Ensan az Manzari Digar (Human from Another Outlook), which is considered the founding text of Erfan-e-Halgheh, became a best-seller in Iran and went into eight imprints, a total of 90,000 prints between 2007 and 2009.

- Taheri, Mohammad Ali (2006). Cosmic mysticism (ring) (in Persian)
- Taheri, Mohammad Ali (2007). Man, from another perspective (in Persian)
- Taheri, Mohammad Ali (2010). The relationship between ethics and mysticism (in Persian)
- Taheri, Mohammad Ali (2011). Man and knowledge (in Persian)
- Taheri, Mohammad Ali (2011). Erfan Keyhani (Halgheh) (Persian edition): Second Edition. Create Space. ISBN 9781466304055.
- Taheri, Mohammad Ali (2011). Human from another outlook. Interuniversal Press. ISBN 9781939507006.
- Taheri, Mohammad Ali (2011). Human Insight (Persian ed.). Create Space. ISBN 9781466234420.
- Taheri, Mohammad Ali (2011). Nonorganic Viruses (Persian ed.). CreateSpace Independent Publishing Platform. ISBN 9781466240377.
- Taheri, Mohammad Ali (2013). Halqeh Mysticism (Inter-universal Mysticism, Vol. 1). Interuniversal Press. ISBN 9781939507105.
- Taheri, Mohammad Ali (2013). Human Worldview. Interuniversal Press. ISBN 9781939507112.
- Taheri, Mohammad Ali (2013). Non-organic beings. Interuniversal Press. ISBN 9781939507129.
- Taheri, Mohammad Ali (2013). Psymentology (Volume 1) (Persian ed.). Intishārāt-i ʻIrfān-i kayhānī (Ḥalqah). ISBN 9781939507136.
- Taheri, Mohammad Ali (2026). Human Perception and Understanding (Volume I). Interuniversal Press. ISBN 9781997147077.
- Taheri, Mohammad Ali (2026). Psymentology Beyond a Single Perspective (Volume One) (Second Canadian ed.). Interuniversal Press. ISBN 9781069900814.

== Critics ==
Having no scientific qualifications, writing in alternative or self published journals and presenting no serious scientific evidence for his theories have got him called a charlatan.

Having been condemned for illegal practice of medicine, fraud, and misrepresentation of academic credentials, his theories are regarded by the scientific and sceptic community as pseudo-science and his alternative medicine as dangerous.
