= Rachael Worby =

American conductor

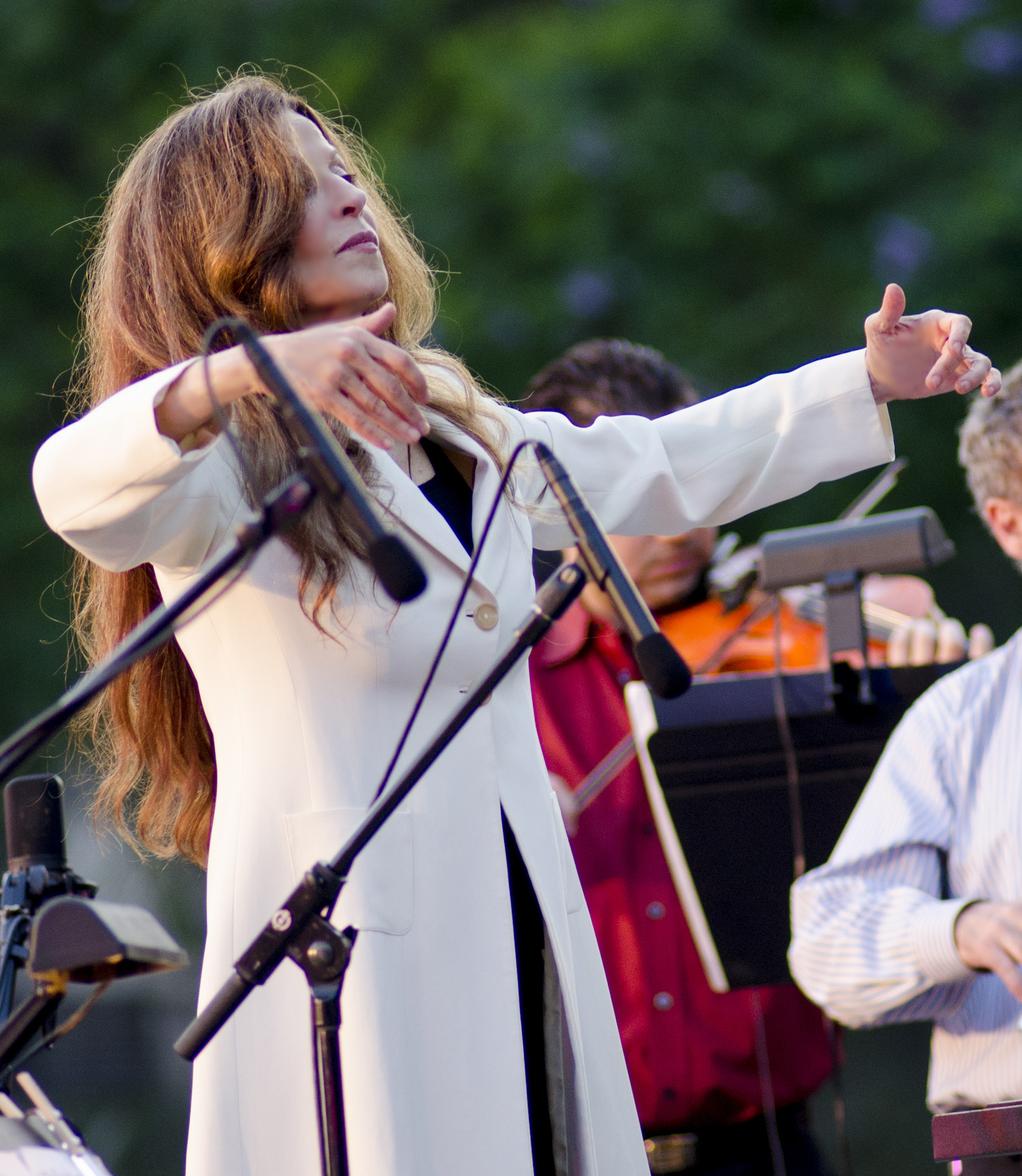
- Worby conducting the MUSE/IQUE Orchestra at a 2012 summer event at California Institute of Technology

First Lady of West Virginia
- In role May 1990 – January 13, 1997
- Governor: Gaston Caperton
- Preceded by: Dee Caperton Kessel
- Succeeded by: Hovah Underwood

Personal details
- Born: 1950 (age 75–76) Nyack, New York, U.S.
- Occupations: Conductor, artistic director of MUSE/IQUE
- Known for: One of the first major women conductors

Rachael Worby is an American conductor who serves as the artistic director, conductor and founder of MUSE/IQUE.

== Life and career ==
=== Early life and education ===
Worby grew up in Nyack, New York with her parents Diana Worby, an English professor Empire State College, and Louis Worby, owner of a hardware manufacturing firm. She began to learn to play the piano at five years old.

She holds a bachelor of arts degree in piano performance from the Crane School of Music at the State University of New York at Potsdam and began graduate work in musicology, at Indiana University and Brandeis University. Spurred to further her training as a conductor, Worby directly appealed to Jacques-Louis Monod. Though he insisted that there would never be a woman on an orchestra podium, Monod provided weekly private lessons to Worby from 1976 to 1981. When she completed this training, she turned to Max Rudolf and Otto Werner-Mueller for additional study.

=== Career ===
After working as a Conducting Assistant for the Spokane Symphony for two years, she became the Assistant Conductor for Youth Concerts at the Los Angeles Philharmonic from 1984 to 1987 and excitedly accepted her childhood idol's former position, Music Director of Carnegie Hall's Young People's Concerts, which she led for twelve years

In 1986, she applied for the position of Music Director and Conductor of the Wheeling Symphony Orchestra.

She married Governor Gaston Caperton in May 1990. While continuing to serve full-time at both the Wheeling Symphony and Carnegie Hall, Worby took on several additional projects as First Lady of West Virginia. She created and hosted the nationally acclaimed Arts and Letters Series, an admission-free, live series, broadcast on public television which presented Carl Sagan, Tom Wicker, Jesse Jackson, Bob Woodward, Taylor Branch, Harry Belafonte, The American Boy Choir and dozens of other notable individuals. She also led the statewide campaign, "Thanks A Million", to raise one million dollars to eradicate illiteracy and created The Governor's School for the Arts in perpetuity.

Worby returned to California and worked as music director of the Pasadena POPS from 2000 to 2010, where she continued her work as a dedicated orchestra builder. Her leadership increased the number of annual concerts and audience attendance while simultaneously securing ongoing funding to institute free-to-the-public concerts and expand outreach programs to underserved communities.

She enjoys a musical relationship and personal friendship with American soprano Jessye Norman. They appear together at music festivals and concert halls throughout the world. At Jessye Norman's request, Worby conducted the China Philharmonic Orchestra in Beijing and the Shanghai Symphony Orchestra in 2006 and served on the Honorary Committee of Carnegie Hall's HONOR! Festival in 2009 as Artistic Advisor and guest panelist.

== MUSE/IQUE ==
=== Founding ===
In 2011, Rachael Worby and a group of community leaders founded MUSE/IQUE, a counter-conventional orchestra in Pasadena.

== Accolades and television credits ==
Rachael Worby received a presidential appointment to the National Council of the Arts, on which she served for four years. In 1990, she was nominated for an ACE Award for two young peoples' orchestra programs she created, narrated and conducted for the Disney Channel.

She has also picked up awards, including the Spirit of Achievement from Albert Einstein College, the Women of Excellence award from the YWCA, the degree Doctor of Humanities honoris causa from Marshall University, the degree of Doctor of Letters honoris causa and the Presidential Medal of Honor for her consummate lifetime achievements both from Claremont University.

Worby's television credits include:

- National Coverage: 2001/2002/2005 Tournament of Roses Parade, Bayer Advanced Garden – "Cocktail Garden Party" Float
- National Coverage: 2004 Tournament of Roses Parade, Odd Fellows and Rebekahs -"Songs of Spring" Float
- National Coverage: Interview with Tom Brokaw, NBC News, "Is the California Dream Still Alive?"
- PBS, The Charlie Rose Show
- ABC, Day One
- PBS, Carnegie Hall at 100: A Place of Dreams
- Disney Channel, Disney's Young Person's Guide to Music: A Toon for a Toon; The Best Band in the Land

== Personal life ==
Worby has been married twice, first to literary agent and producer David Obst from 1986 to 1990. In May 1990 she married Gaston Caperton.

Honorary titles
Preceded by Dee Caperton	First Lady of West Virginia; 1990 – 1997	Succeeded by Hovah Hall Underwood
