= Hovah Hall Underwood =

First Lady of West Virginia (1919–2004)

First Lady of West Virginia
- In role January 13, 1997 – January 15, 2001
- Governor: Cecil H. Underwood
- Preceded by: Rachael Worby
- Succeeded by: Sandra Casber Wise
- In role January 14, 1957 – January 16, 1961
- Governor: Cecil H. Underwood
- Preceded by: Valerie Allen Marland
- Succeeded by: Opal Barron

Personal details
- Born: April 12, 1919 Grantsville, West Virginia, U.S.
- Died: September 24, 2004 (aged 85) Charleston, West Virginia, U.S.
- Spouse: Cecil H. Underwood (m. 1948)
- Known for: First lady of West Virginia, 1957–1961 & 1997–2001

Hovah Hall Underwood (April 12, 1919 – September 24, 2004) was an American from West Virginia. She was a Methodist. She was the wife of former Governor of West Virginia Cecil H. Underwood and served as that state's First Lady during 1957-1961 and 1997-2001.

== Biography ==
Hovah Hall Underwood was born on April 12, 1919, in Grantsville, West Virginia. During her schooling, she became an accomplished musician, playing the piano and saxophone fluently and later giving private lessons. She graduated in 1937 from Grantsville High School.

She graduated with an A.B. Degree from Salem College in Salem, West Virginia, and a Certificate in Social Work from West Virginia University. Underwood went on to teach at Grantsville Grade School, later working at a defense plant during World War II before serving ten years as a child welfare employee.

While at Salem College, she met her future husband, Cecil H. Underwood, through her two sisters when they were classmates. They were wed on July 25, 1948, at Knotts Methodist Church in Grantsville.

Underwood served as first lady to her husband who was Governor of West Virginia from 1957 until 1961 and from 1997 until 2001. She supported and assisted with a variety of causes, including Big Brothers Big Sisters of America, the Huntington Museum of Art, Marshall University Artist Series, the United Methodist Church Foundation, and America's Promise. She was a member of various organizations, including Daughters of the American Revolution, Governor's Mansion Preservation Foundation, West Virginia Symphony League and the American Association of Social Workers.

She died on September 24, 2004, aged 85, from complications of a stroke. Her body was donated to Marshall University's Joan C. Edwards School of Medicine.

Honorary titles
Preceded by Valerie Allen Marland	First Lady of West Virginia; 1957–1961	Succeeded by Opal Wilcox Barron
Preceded by Rachael Worby	First Lady of West Virginia; 1997–2001	Succeeded by Sandra Casber Wise
