= Maude Brown Dawson =

First Lady of West Virginia

- Born: April 29, 1874; Preston County, West Virginia
- Died: December 13, 1946 (aged 72); Charleston, West Virginia
- Other names: Maude Brown Dawson Miller
- Known for: First lady of West Virginia, 1905-1909

Maude Brown Dawson (1874–1946) was the wife of former Governor of West Virginia William M. O. Dawson and served as that state's First Lady, 1909-1913. She was born April 29, 1874, in Preston County, West Virginia; the first governor's wife born in West Virginia after statehood.

In 1899, Maude Brown became the second wife of William M. O. Dawson and stepmother to his 18-year-old son, Daniel Dawson. In 1901, she bore to William M. O. Dawson a daughter, Leah Jane Dawson. This child was 7 years old when William Dawson became governor and Maude became first lady of the state. While first lady, Maude bore a son, William Brown Dawson, on September 2, 1912. (In later years, this son adopted his father’s name, William M. O. Dawson.)

As first lady, Maude Brown Dawson hosted social gatherings and participated in Charleston civic affairs. After leaving office, the Dawsons continued to reside in Charleston. On March 12, 1916, the former governor William M. O. Dawson died in their home on Virginia Street. His body was buried in Kingwood, West Virginia.

Five years later, Maude Brown Dawson married William N. Miller, a judge on the Supreme Court of Appeals of West Virginia. They lived in Charleston for the remainder of their lives. William N. Miller died August 7, 1928. Maude Brown Dawson Miller died December 13, 1946. Her body lies in Sunset Memorial Cemetery, South Charleston, West Virginia.

Honorary titles
Preceded by Agnes Ward White	First Lady of West Virginia; 1905–1909	Succeeded by Mary Miller Glasscock
