= Cathy Justice =

American educator, First lady of West Virginia

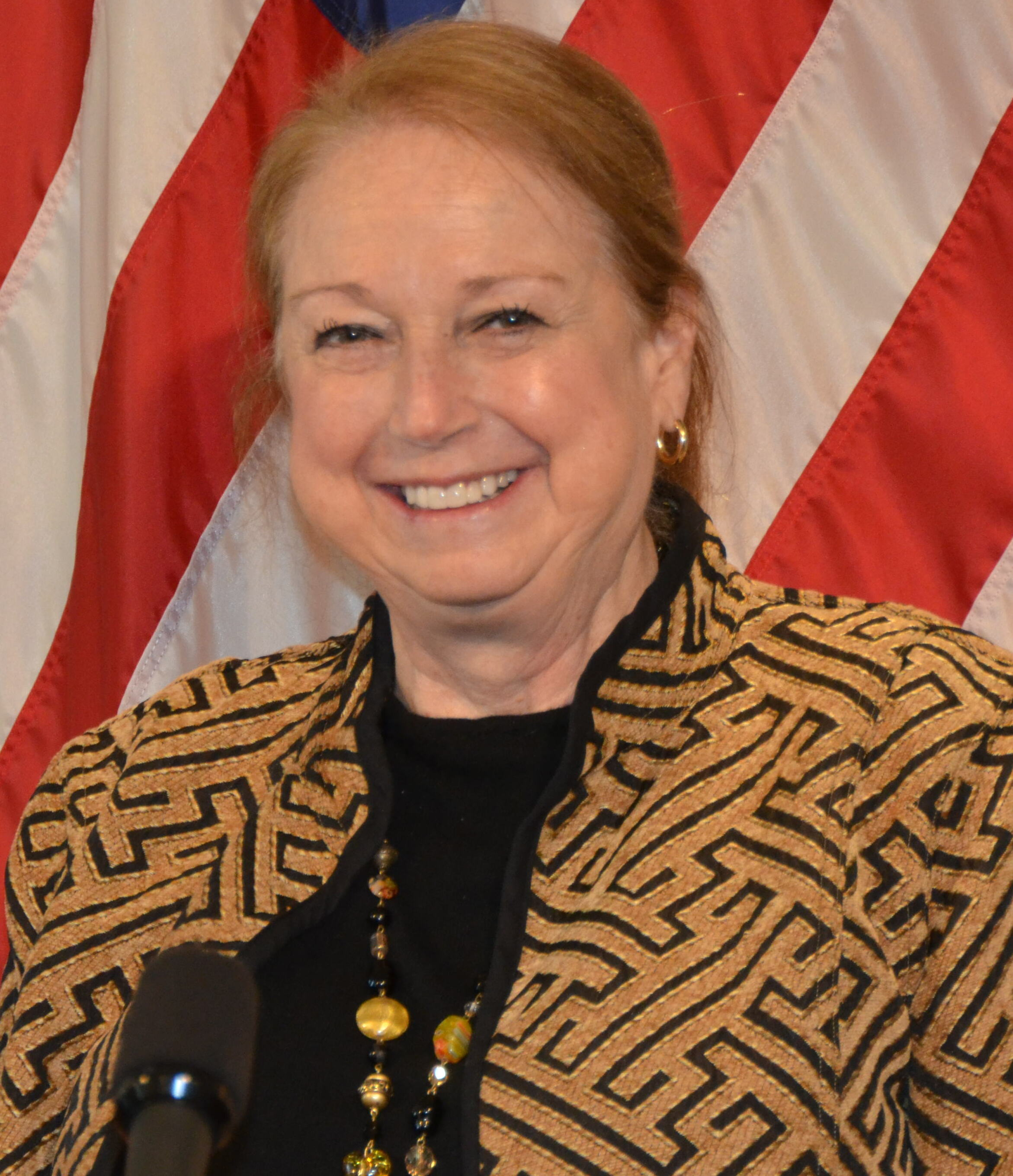
- Justice in 2017

First Lady of West Virginia
- In office January 16, 2017 – January 13, 2025
- Governor: Jim Justice
- Preceded by: Joanne Tomblin
- Succeeded by: Denise Morrisey

Personal details
- Born: January 28, 1953 (age 73) Beckley, West Virginia, U.S.
- Spouse: Jim Justice (m. 1975)
- Children: 2
- Education: Marshall University (MEd)

Cathy Leigh Justice (née Comer; born January 28, 1953) is an American educator who served as the first lady of West Virginia from 2017 to 2025, and as a member of the West Virginia State Board of Education since 2024. Her husband, former state Governor Jim Justice, is now a U.S. Senator from West Virginia.

== Early life ==
Cathy Leigh Comer, daughter and only child of Thomas Leigh and Virginia Ruth Comer, was born in Beckley, West Virginia, and grew up in Prosperity, West Virginia.

She graduated from Woodrow Wilson High School in 1970, where she met her future husband, Jim Justice. She graduated from Marshall University with a degree in secondary education.

== Career ==
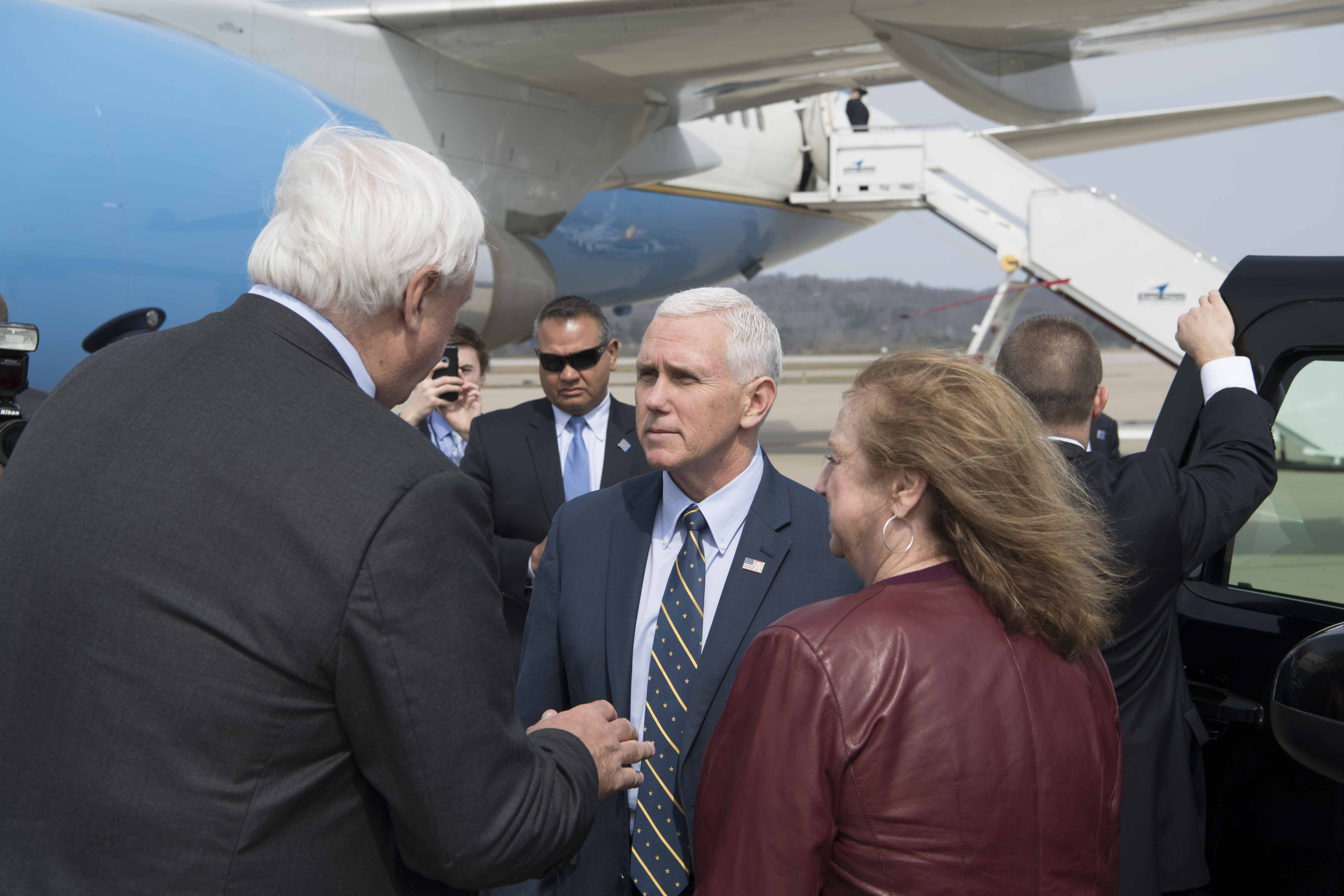
Jim and Cathy Justice meeting Vice President Mike Pence in March 2017.

Justice served as president of Comer Electric, Inc., a business started by her family, and she was a member of the board of directors for First National Bank in Ronceverte for five years.

Justice also spent time substitute teaching in Raleigh County Schools, and she is involved in a local reading program for elementary school students. She became involved in elementary school programs affiliated with her local church, continuing her dedication to supporting young learners.

Justice became the first lady of West Virginia when her husband, Governor Jim Justice, was sworn in on January 16, 2017. She celebrated Women's History Month with a televised speech on March 8, 2017. In her speech, Justice recognized a number of West Virginia women who have made a difference in the state, like novelist Pearl S. Buck, actress Jennifer Garner, and basketball player Vicky Bullett.

In 2018, Justice launched the Communities In Schools (CIS) program across the state. This dropout prevention program was designed to support at-risk students and grew rapidly under her leadership, expanding to 285 schools in all 55 West Virginia counties. This achievement made West Virginia the only state with a CIS program in every county.

Justice initiated the Friends With Paws program, which placed certified therapy dogs in schools throughout West Virginia. Over 40 therapy dogs were deployed to provide emotional support and companionship to students, enhancing school environments and helping children manage stress.

In November 2024, Justice was appointed to a nine-year term on the West Virginia State Board of Education by her husband, governor Jim Justice. This appointment, which followed his victory in a U.S. Senate race, filled the board seat previously held by Daniel Snavely. Governor Justice highlighted her extensive experience and dedication to youth programs, asserting that her qualifications made her an ideal candidate for the role.

== Personal life ==
Justice and her husband Jim reside in Lewisburg, West Virginia. The family chose not to reside in the West Virginia Governor's Mansion. The couple have two children.

=== Legal ===
In July 2021, Carter Bank & Trust, a banking company, went after Jim and Cathy Justice for a $58 million loan default based on guarantees they signed. The company filed claims over the millions of dollars based on defaults of The Greenbrier Sporting Club and Oakhurst Club.

Honorary titles
Preceded by Joanne Tomblin	First Lady of West Virginia; 2017–2025	Succeeded by Denise Morrisey
