= Gayle Conelly Manchin =

American educator (born 1947)

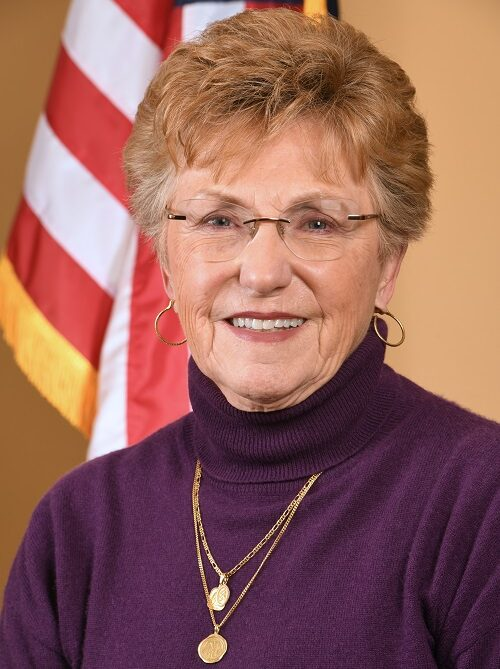
- Official portrait, 2023

Federal Co-Chair of the Appalachian Regional Commission
- Incumbent
- Assumed office May 6, 2021
- President: Joe Biden; Donald Trump
- Preceded by: Tim Thomas

West Virginia Secretary of Education and the Arts
- In office January 16, 2017 – March 12, 2018
- Governor: Jim Justice
- Preceded by: Kay Goodwin
- Succeeded by: Clayton Burch (acting)

President of the West Virginia Board of Education
- In office July 2013 – 2014

First Lady of West Virginia
- In role January 17, 2005 – November 15, 2010
- Governor: Joe Manchin
- Preceded by: Sandra Wise
- Succeeded by: Joanne Tomblin

Personal details
- Born: Gayle Conelly; June 20, 1947 (age 79) Beckley, West Virginia, U.S.
- Spouse: Joe Manchin (m. 1967)
- Children: 3, including Heather Bresch
- Education: West Virginia University (BA, MA); Salem International University (MS)

Gayle Conelly Manchin (née Conelly; born June 20, 1947) is an American educator and government official who was the First Lady of West Virginia from 2005 to 2010 and has served as the Federal Co-Chair of the Appalachian Regional Commission since 2021. Manchin previously served as the president of the West Virginia Board of Education from 2013 to 2014 and West Virginia Secretary of Education and the Arts from 2017 until her termination in March 2018. She is married to former governor and former U.S. Senator Joe Manchin of West Virginia.

== Early life and education ==
Manchin was raised in Beckley, West Virginia, and graduated from Woodrow Wilson High School. She received both her Bachelor of Arts in language arts and education, and a Master of Arts in reading (now known as the masters in literacy education), from West Virginia University. In 1999, she received a second master's degree in educational technology leadership from Salem International University.

== Career ==
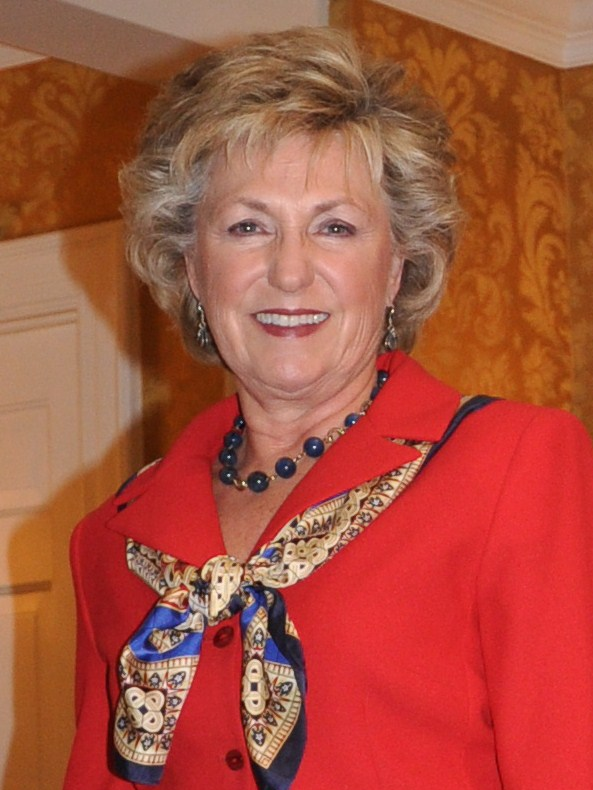
Gayle Manchin as First Lady of West Virginia, 2009

Manchin has worked as a teacher in the Marion County Public School district and a faculty member at Fairmont State University, where she established the university's inaugural Community Service Learning Program.

She has also served as Director of the AmeriCorps Promise Fellow Program in West Virginia. Additionally, Manchin worked for the Office of Secretary of Education and the Arts, where she established the West Virginia Partnerships to Assure Student Success initiative (WV PASS).

Manchin held the position of First Lady of West Virginia from 2005 until 2010 during her husband's term as the state's governor. During her tenure as First Lady, Manchin simultaneously served as the chairperson of the West Virginia Citizen’s Council on Children and Families and Governor’s Healthy Lifestyles Coalition, co-chair of the Governor’s 21st Century Jobs Cabinet and the Intellectual Infrastructure of Vision Shared, and a member of the West Virginia Commission for National and Community Service.

In 2007, Manchin was appointed to the West Virginia Board of Education from 2007 to 2015. She served two terms as the Board of Education's vice president. On July 10, 2013, Manchin was elected President of the West Virginia Board of Education for a two-year term.

In 2016, Manchin was the subject of some controversy when USA Today, a national newspaper, published an article noting that Manchin, upon becoming Board of Education president in 2012, spearheaded a campaign for states to require schools to purchase EpiPens and other medical supplies. Eleven states created laws to require schools to stock EpiPens, made by Mylan pharmaceuticals, leading to a "near monopoly" of Mylan's epinephrine autoinjector in the school health sector. The article noted the potential for a conflict of interest, as Mylan's CEO, Heather Bresch, is Manchin's daughter.

=== West Virginia Secretary of Education and the Arts ===
Incoming Governor of West Virginia Jim Justice appointed Manchin to his cabinet as the state's Secretary of Education and the Arts on January 13, 2017. Manchin succeeded outgoing Secretary of Education Kay Goodwin, who was retiring from the office. The Secretary for Education and the Arts oversees a collection of six state agencies, including West Virginia Public Broadcasting, the West Virginia Library Commission, the Division of Culture and History, Volunteer West Virginia, the state Center for Professional Development, and the Division of Rehabilitation Services.

After the passage of HB 4006, a bill that would dissolve the West Virginia Department of Education and the Arts, in the West Virginia Legislature, Manchin called on Justice to veto the legislation. Manchin also offered to resign and "remove any political cloud," though days later, she was removed from office by Justice, leaving the office of Department Secretary vacant.

=== U.S. Commission on International Religious Freedom ===
On April 19, 2018, Manchin was appointed to the United States Commission on International Religious Freedom (USCIRF). As Vice Chair, she has spoken out on behalf of Iranian prisoner, Mohammad Ali Taheri. After the January 27, 2019, bombing of the Jolo Cathedral in the Philippines, in an interview on EWTN News Nightly, she expressed disapproval of President Rodrigo Duterte's prior "angry, violent language" against Church leaders. In March 2021, Gayle, who had moved to the role of Chair, was sanctioned by the Chinese government over the USCIRF recommendation that the United States government and its partners sanction Chinese officials involved in human rights abuses committed on the Uyghur minority in Xinjiang. Manchin said that she was "flattered" by the sanctions.

=== Federal Co-Chair of the Appalachian Regional Commission (ARC) ===
Appointed by President Biden and confirmed by the Senate, Gayle Conelly Manchin was sworn in as the thirteenth federal co-chair of the Appalachian Regional Commission (ARC) in May 2021. She is the first co-chair from West Virginia. The Commission's mission “is to innovate, partner and invest to build community capacity and strengthen economic growth in Appalachia”. This region spreads across 13 states, 12 partially and all of West Virginia. Manchin works directly with the 13 governors concerned by the development of an economically depressed region. Upon taking office, Manchin stated that her top priorities are " to support the creation of economic opportunities in the Appalachian Region, improve broadband access and critical infrastructure in Appalachian communities, and address the region’s opioid crisis".

== Personal life ==
In 1967, Gayle Conelly married Joe Manchin, with whom she had three children, Heather, Joseph IV, and Brooke, and settled in Fairmont, West Virginia.

== See also ==
- Governor of West Virginia
- West Virginia Governor's Mansion

Political offices
Preceded by Kay Goodwin	West Virginia Secretary of Education and the Arts; 2017–2018	Vacant
Honorary titles
Preceded by Sandra Wise	First Lady of West Virginia; 2005–2010	Succeeded by Joanne Tomblin
