= Joanne Tomblin =

Former first lady of West Virginia

First Lady of West Virginia
- Assumed role January 13, 2011 – January 15, 2017
- Governor: Earl Ray Tomblin
- Preceded by: Gayle Conelly Manchin
- Succeeded by: Cathy Justice

Personal details
- Born: Long Island, New York, U.S.
- Spouse: Earl Ray Tomblin (m. 1979)
- Children: 1
- Education: Marshall University (BA & MA)

Joanne Tomblin served as former president of Southern West Virginia Community and Technical College and was formerly West Virginia's first lady, as the wife of Earl Ray Tomblin.

== Early life and education ==
Tomblin grew up in Long Island, New York before relocating to Huntington, West Virginia, where she earned her bachelor's and master's degrees in journalism from Marshall University.

== Career ==
Tomblin became president of Southern West Virginia Community and Technical College in November 1999, the same year the school's name changed from Southern West Virginia Community College. She led the school, based in Mount Gay, West Virginia, through her husband's tenure as governor, during which time she worked to connect laid-off coal miners with retraining programs, partnering with organizations such as WorkForce West Virginia and various federal agencies and private foundations. She retired from the presidency on June 30, 2015.

From 2010 to 2017, Tomblin served as First Lady of West Virginia, while her husband, Earl Ray Tomblin, held office as governor. In that role, she launched several statewide initiatives, including "Serve West Virginia Military," which encouraged residents to support military personnel and their families, and, in 2011, the "Our Babies: Safe and Sound" program, aimed at educating new parents about safe sleep practices for infants. Later in her term, she produced a cookbook of recipes from around the state in partnership with the West Virginia Division of Culture and History.

Honorary titles
Preceded by Gayle Conelly Manchin	First Lady of West Virginia; 2017–2025	Succeeded by Cathy Justice
