= 1900 West Virginia gubernatorial election =

- November 6, 1900
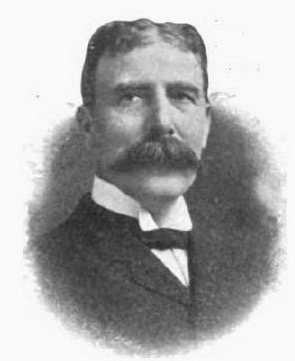

| Nominee | Albert B. White | John H. Holt |
| Party | Republican | Democratic |
| Popular vote | 118,798 | 100,233 |
| Percentage | 53.84% | 45.43% |
- County results White: 50–60% 60–70% 70–80% Holt: 50–60% 60–70% 70–80%
Governor before election
George W. Atkinson
Republican
Elected Governor
Albert B. White
Republican

The 1900 West Virginia gubernatorial election took place on November 6, 1900, to elect the governor of West Virginia.

== Results ==
West Virginia gubernatorial election, 1900
| Party | Candidate | Votes | % |
|---|---|---|---|
| Republican | Albert B. White | 118,798 | 53.84 |
| Democratic | John H. Holt | 100,233 | 45.43 |
| Prohibition | Thomas Carskadon | 1,315 | 0.60 |
| Populist | H. T. Houston | 306 | 0.14 |
| Total votes | | 220,652 | 100 |
| Republican hold | | | |
