= Erfan-e-Halgheh =

Iranian spiritual movement

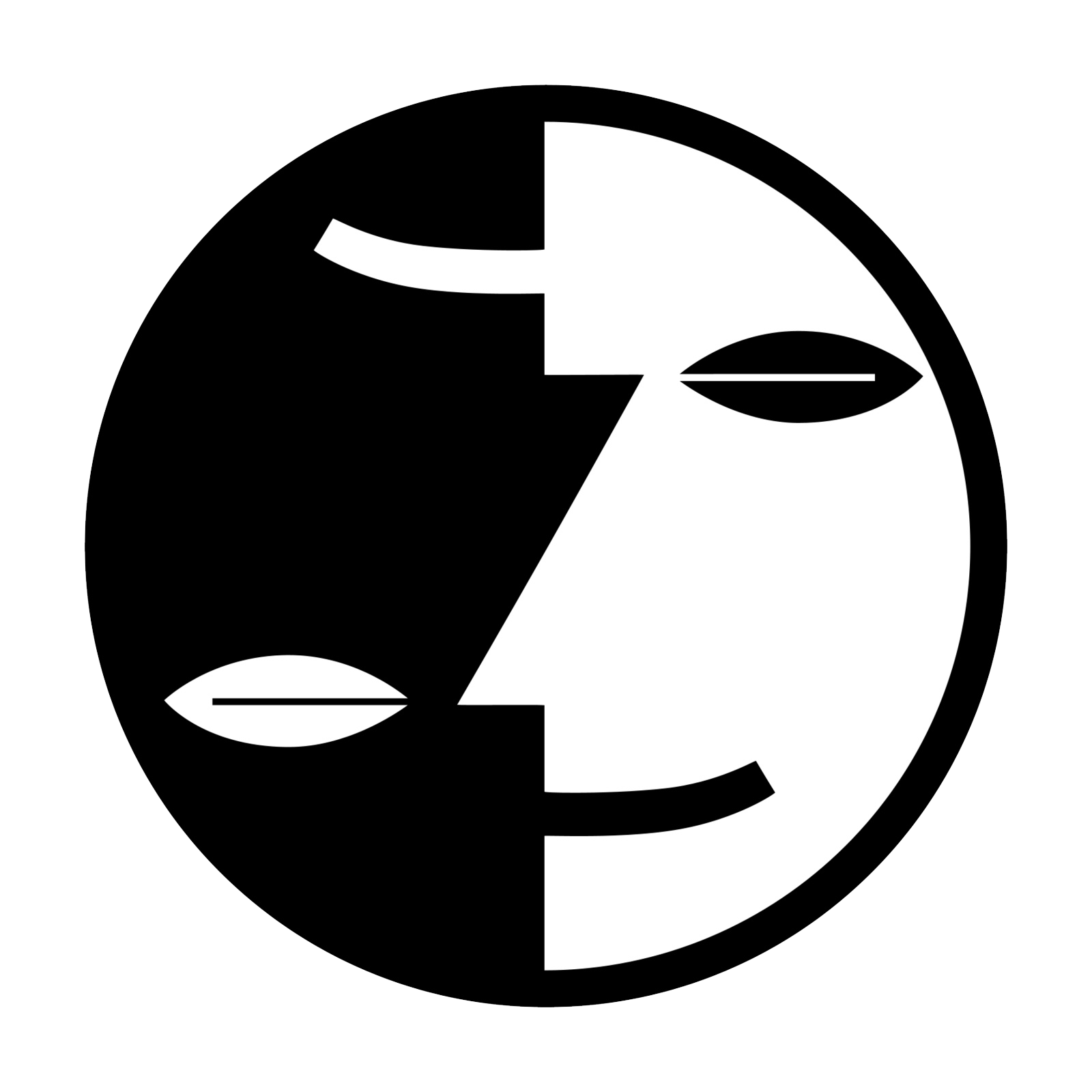
Erfan-e-Halgheh logo

Erfan-e-Halgheh, also known as Erfan-e-Halqeh, Erfan-e-Kayhani, Erfan Kaihan, Cosmic Mysticism, Interuniversal Mysticism, and Mysticism of the Ring, is a spiritual movement which was started in Iran by mystic Mohammad Ali Taheri in 1978. The movement promotes ideas and practices that seek to establish a connection between the individual and cosmic consciousness, and is open to anyone of any faith.

Erfan-e-Halgheh centers are spread worldwide and are present in Austria, Denmark, Canada, Sweden, United Kingdom, and the United States.

== Teachings ==
=== Background ===
Iran has a rich tradition surrounding mystical culture which is known as Erfan in Iran. Erfan is a Persian language word which means "knowing" and is often compared to Greco-Christian concept of gnosis. According to Taheri, "the term is used to refer both to Islamic mysticism as well as the attainment of spiritual knowledge springing from the direct insight".

Erfan was established in Iran in the eleventh century and since then has developed a variety of rich forms, rituals, and practices. For many Iranians, Erfan is an expression of personal religion or personal relation with the God.

Erfan also overlaps significantly with Sufism. Sufism is a way of life in which one seeks direct consciousness in presence of God while the purpose of Erfan is to seek the state of "kamal" (attainment of perfection or completeness). According to the New Encyclopedia Britannica, "Erfan consists of a variety of mystical paths that are designed to ascertain the nature of humanity and of God and to facilitate the experience of the presence of divine love and wisdom in the world".

=== Erfan-e-Halgheh ===
A new path of Erfan was started by an Iranian mystic Mohammad Ali Taheri after intuitions in 1978. It is also known as Interuniversal Mysticism. The term Interuniversal Mysticism, according to Taheri, refers to a kind of mystical thought.

Its teachings center around halgheh, meaning 'ring', referring to the a triadic relationship between the 'interuniversal consciousness' (sho’ur keyhani), a person needing connection with the interuniversal consciousness, and another person able to facilitate that connection. A ring may be differentiated by its particular purpose, such as healing, and at least 60 such 'rings' have been introduced to adherents of Erfan-e-Halgheh.

==== Alternative medicine ====
Erfan-e-Halgheh teaches forms of alternative medicine including faradarmani, intended to treat the body, and psymentology, intended to treat the mind. Together, these therapies are considered to form a complete treatment system for bodily, psychical, psychosomatic, and mental diseases.

== Persecution ==
The movement became wildly popular in urban centers of Iran. Because of the movement's popularity, Iranian authorities started persecuting Interuniversal Mysticism followers in 2010. Since then, the founder of the movement has been kept in prison for eight years and the activities of the followers have been forbidden in Iran.

In August 2015, two followers of the Erfan Halghe, Fahimeh A’rafi and Ziba Pour Habib were arrested. Ziba Pour Habib was an activist of the movement and was charged for insulting the sanctities. She was sentenced to three years and was transferred to notorious Evin Prison. Whereas, Fahimeh A’rafi was arrested from her home by the Iranian Revolutionary Guards and was transferred to Gharchak Prison to serve five-year imprisonment for insulting the sanctities.

In November 2015, Sara Sa’ie was arrested during her participation in the rally, protesting Mohammad Ali Taheri's death sentence. During the same rally, another women, Zahra Sadat Ibrahimi, was also arrested.
