= Denise Morrisey =

American lobbyist, First lady of West Virginia (born 1964)

First Lady of West Virginia
- Current
- Assumed role January 13, 2025
- Governor: Patrick Morrisey
- Preceded by: Cathy Justice

Personal details
- Born: Denise Henry; June 5, 1964 (age 62) Omaha, Nebraska, U.S.
- Spouse: Patrick Morrisey (m. 2008)
- Children: 1
- Education: George Washington University (BA)

Denise Morrisey (née Henry; born June 5, 1964) is an American lobbyist who has served as the first lady of West Virginia since 2025. She is a founding member of the lobbying firm Capitol Counsel, based in Washington, D.C. Morrisey is married to West Virginia governor Patrick Morrisey.

== Early life and education ==
Morrisey was born on June 5, 1964, in Omaha, Nebraska. She graduated from George Washington University with a Bachelor of Arts.

== Career ==
Morrisey founded Strategic Health Solutions, a boutique and consulting firm in 2002. She is also a co-founder of The Legislative Strategies Group, a healthcare practice firm focused on pharmaceuticals, biotechnology, and medical devices.

Morrisey lobbied on opioids for Cardinal Health, the state of West Virginia's lead opioid supplier, from 1999 to 2016, which became the subject of controversy and media speculation regarding possible family ties to Big Pharma.

In 2018, it was revealed that Planned Parenthood had paid Morrisey more than $460,000 for lobbying.

Morrisey became first lady of West Virginia when her husband, Patrick Morrisey, was sworn in as the 37th governor of West Virginia on January 13, 2025, after being elected in the 2024 West Virginia gubernatorial election.

== Personal life ==
She is married to Patrick Morrisey, current governor of West Virginia. They have one daughter, Julia. She resided solely in Northern Virginia for a short period, but the family resided in Jefferson County, West Virginia. She currently lives in the West Virginia Governor's Mansion.

Honorary titles
Preceded by Cathy Justice	First Lady of West Virginia; 2025–present	Incumbent
