= Myra Horner Camden Atkinson =

- Born: July 21, 1844; Lumberport, Virginia
- Died: April 13, 1925 (aged 80); Clarksburg, West Virginia
- Known for: First lady of West Virginia, 1897-1901

Myra Horner Camden Atkinson (July 21, 1844 – April 13, 1925) was the wife of former Virginia Governor George W. Atkinson and served as that state's First Lady, 1897-1901.

She was born July 21, 1844, at Lumberport, West Virginia. Her father Horner was locally prominent. Her first husband was Davis. After the American Civil War, she married for the second time, to Judge Gideon D. Camden, who had sympathized with the Confederacy, became a member of the West Virginia Senate as well as become quite wealthy investing in land and minerals in what became West Virginia during the war. Judge Camden died in 1891. In June 1897, shortly after George W. Atkinson became governor, the widower married the twice-widowed Myra. After leaving office, she took an active interest in family history and was a member of social groups in Charleston, Parkersburg, and Clarksburg, West Virginia. She died at Clarksburg April 13, 1925, nine days after former Gov. Atkinson.

Honorary titles
Preceded by Belle Goshorn MacCorkle	First Lady of West Virginia; 1897–1901	Succeeded by Agnes Ward White
