= Boyer Glover =

Boyer Glover (fl. 1758–1771), was a Muggletonian, and a watch and clock maker in Leadenhall Street, London, England.

Glover was a strong Muggletonian, but the notices of him in the records of the sect are very scanty. He acted as a peacemaker, and opposed the issue of the fourth (1760) edition of Reeve and Muggleton's 'Divine Looking-Glass,' containing political passages omitted in the second (1661) and fifth (1846) editions. Glover's spiritual songs are to be found in 'Songs of Grateful Praise,' &c., 1794, 12mo (seven by Glover); and 'Divine Songs of the Muggletonians,' &c., 1829, 16mo (forty-nine by Glover, including the previous seven, and one by his wife, Elizabeth Glover). Others are in unprinted manuscript collections.
