= Boyer, Nevada =

- Ghost town
- Location within Nevada Location within the United States
- Coordinates: 39°57′30″N 117°52′03″W
- Country: United States
- State: Nevada
- County: Churchill
- Elevation: 3,507 ft (1,069 m)
- GNIS feature ID: 0855235

Boyer is a ghost town in northeastern Churchill County, in the U.S. state of Nevada.

== History ==
A post office was established at Boyer in 1896, and remained in operation until 1914. The community was named after Alva Boyer, a prospector and postmaster.
