= Boyer, West Virginia =

Unincorporated community in West Virginia, United States

- Unincorporated community
- Location within West Virginia Location within the United States
- Coordinates: 38°29′20″N 79°48′02″W
- Country: United States
- State: West Virginia
- County: Pocahontas
- Elevation: 2,680 ft (820 m)
- Time zone: UTC-5 (Eastern (EST))
  - Summer (DST): UTC-4 (EDT)
- Area codes: 304 & 681
- GNIS feature ID: 1553957

Boyer is an unincorporated community in Pocahontas County, West Virginia, United States. Boyer is located on state routes 28 and 92, 4 miles (6.4 km) south-southeast of Durbin.

The community was named for a businessperson in the lumber industry.

== Notable person ==
Opal Wilcox Barron was born here on September 19, 1914. She became the First Lady of West Virginia from 1961 to 1965.
