= Valerie Allen Marland =

- Born: 16 June 1917; Lacon, Illinois
- Died: 22 October 1977; Barrington, Illinois
- Known for: First lady of West Virginia, 1953-1957

Valerie Allen Marland (June 16, 1917 – October 22, 1977) was the wife of former governor of West Virginia William C. Marland and served as that state's First Lady 1953–1957. She was born in Lacon, Illinois, and married Marland in 1942. As first lady, she dedicated most of her time raising their four children. After former governor Marland lost an election to the United States Senate in 1958, the family moved to Barrington, Illinois, where Valerie Marland became a high school English teacher. The Marlands returned to West Virginia in 1965, but William Marland died of cancer shortly thereafter. Valerie Marland returned to Barrington, where she was killed in an apartment fire in 1977.

Honorary titles
Preceded by Lee Hawse Patteson	First Lady of West Virginia; 1953 – 1957	Succeeded by Hovah Hall Underwood
