= Boyer rifle =

Flintlock rifle gun

The Boyer Rifle was a specialized over-and-under flintlock gun with one smooth gun barrel and one rifled barrel. This allowed it to be used as either a rifle or a shotgun. This variant of the Boyer rifle was created around 1800.

== Mechanical Description ==
The two barrels were rotated into firing position by releasing a hinged catch in front of the trigger guard. There was a single lock that was used to fire using whichever barrel was currently in position.

The 1800 variant was of .45 caliber. Each barrel was 36 inches long and the entire gun was 52 inches in length.

== Variants ==
There is another known variant that was created around the late 1840s that used a side-by-side barrel configuration and was fired using a percussion cap mechanism rather than a flintlock mechanism. Although this gun was also a Boyer rifle, the gunsmith was not the same as the earlier 1800 variant.

== The Gunsmiths ==
The 1800 variant was named after its creator Daniel Boyer of Orwigsburg, Pennsylvania. He used a D. BOYER inscription to identify his guns.

The 1840 variant was named after its creator David Boyer. He also used a D. BOYER inscription to identify his guns. It is unknown whether these two men were related.

== See also ==
- Gun safety

- Shot Guns
