= Lee Hawse Patteson =

- Born: May 28, 1902; Romney, West Virginia
- Died: August 2, 1955 (aged 53); Mt. Hope, West Virginia
- Known for: First lady of West Virginia, 1949-1953

Lee Hawse Patteson (1902–1955) was the wife of former Governor of West Virginia Okey L. Patteson and served as that state's First Lady, 1949-1953. She was born May 28, 1902, at Romney, West Virginia. She married Okey L. Patteson in 1923. As first lady, she entertained guests and began the tradition of decorating the trees around the West Virginia Governor's Mansion for the holidays. She also obtained a pilot's license while serving as first lady. She died in Mt. Hope, West Virginia, on August 2, 1955.

Honorary titles
Preceded by Nancy Massie Meadows	First Lady of West Virginia; 1949 – 1953	Succeeded by Valerie Allen Marland
