= Shelley Riley Moore =

First Lady of West Virginia from 1969 to 1977

First Lady of West Virginia
- In role January 14, 1985 – January 16, 1989
- Governor: Arch A. Moore Jr.
- Preceded by: Sharon Percy Rockefeller
- Succeeded by: Dee Caperton
- In role January 13, 1969 – January 17, 1977
- Governor: Arch A. Moore Jr.
- Preceded by: Mary Alice Tieche Smith
- Succeeded by: Sharon Percy Rockefeller

Personal details
- Born: Sadie Shelley Riley; July 15, 1926 Miami, Florida, U.S.
- Died: September 13, 2014 (aged 88) Charleston, West Virginia, U.S.
- Spouse: Arch A. Moore Jr. (m. 1949)
- Children: 3, including Shelley

Shelley Riley Moore (July 15, 1926 – September 13, 2014) was an American educator who served as the First Lady of West Virginia from 1969–1977, and from 1985–1989 during the tenure of her husband, former Governor Arch A. Moore Jr. and the mother of U.S. Senator Shelley Moore Capito.

Moore's twelve-year tenure was the longest of any first lady in West Virginia's history. Moore founded the West Virginia Mansion Preservation Foundation in 1985 to preserve the state Governor's Mansion. She was the mother of West Virginia politician Shelley Moore Capito. Moore's grandchildren Moore Capito and Riley Moore are also politicians.

== Early life ==
Moore was born Sadie Shelley Riley in Miami, Florida, on July 15, 1926, the daughter of Sadie Wardlow (née Wellens) and Jacob Lewis Riley. While earning a degree in education at West Virginia University, she met Arch A. Moore Jr., whom she married in 1949. She taught school in Pennsylvania for several years before her husband entered politics. After serving for a dozen years in the United States House of Representatives, Arch Moore was elected Governor. As First Lady, she gave speeches throughout West Virginia and appeared at college campuses, vocational facilities, library dedication ceremonies, and before civic and religious groups. She took an interest in promoting the West Virginia Governor's Mansion and offered public tours of the mansion. She also conducted televised tours and started the West Virginia Mansion Preservation Foundation to help restore and maintain the mansion.

== Death ==
Moore died, aged 88, on September 13, 2014, at the Arthur B. Hodges Center in Charleston, West Virginia. She and her husband were residents of Glen Dale, West Virginia.

Honorary titles
Preceded by Mary Alice Tieche Smith	First Lady of West Virginia; 1969 – 1977	Succeeded by Sharon Percy Rockefeller
Preceded by Sharon Percy Rockefeller	First Lady of West Virginia; 1985 – 1989	Succeeded by Dee Caperton
