= Agnes Ward White =

- Born: 1857; Marietta, Ohio
- Died: 1943 (aged 85–86); Parkersburg, West Virginia
- Known for: First lady of West Virginia, 1901-1905

Agnes Ward White (1857–1943) was the wife of former West Virginia Governor Albert B. White and served as that state's First Lady, 1901–1905. She was born in 1857 at Marietta, Ohio. In 1879, she married Albert B. White. The Whites lived at Parkersburg, West Virginia, where Albert was publisher of the State Journal. She was one of the most private first ladies and shunned the role of hostess. After leaving the office, the Whites returned to Parkersburg, where she died in 1943.

Honorary titles
Preceded by Myra Horner Camden Atkinson	First Lady of West Virginia; 1901 – 1905	Succeeded by Maude Brown Dawson
