= Gaston Caperton =

American politician (born 1940)

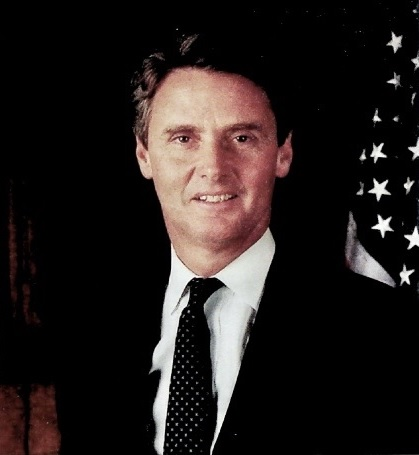

31st Governor of West Virginia
- In office January 16, 1989 – January 13, 1997
- Preceded by: Arch A. Moore Jr.
- Succeeded by: Cecil H. Underwood

Personal details
- Born: William Gaston Caperton III; February 21, 1940 (age 86) Charleston, West Virginia, U.S.
- Party: Democratic
- Spouses: Dee Kessel (m. 1965; div. 1989); Rachael Worby (m. 1990; div. 1998); Idit Harel (m. 2003; div. 2012)
- Education: University of North Carolina, Chapel Hill (BA)

William Gaston Caperton III (born February 21, 1940) is an American politician who served as the 31st governor of West Virginia from 1989 to 1997. He was president of the College Board, which administers the nationally recognized SAT and AP tests, from 1999 to 2012. He is a member of the Democratic Party.

== Pre-gubernatorial history ==
Caperton was born in Charleston, West Virginia. He attended Dexter School (Brookline, Massachusetts), Episcopal High School in Alexandria, Virginia, and the University of North Carolina at Chapel Hill, where he was a member of Delta Kappa Epsilon.

After graduation, he returned to Charleston to manage a family-owned insurance firm. He soon became its principal owner and, under his watch, it became the tenth largest privately owned insurance brokerage firm in the nation. Caperton owned a bank and mortgage banking firm. Caperton was elected governor in his first attempt to seek public office in 1988.

== Gubernatorial history, 1988–1997 ==
=== Elections ===
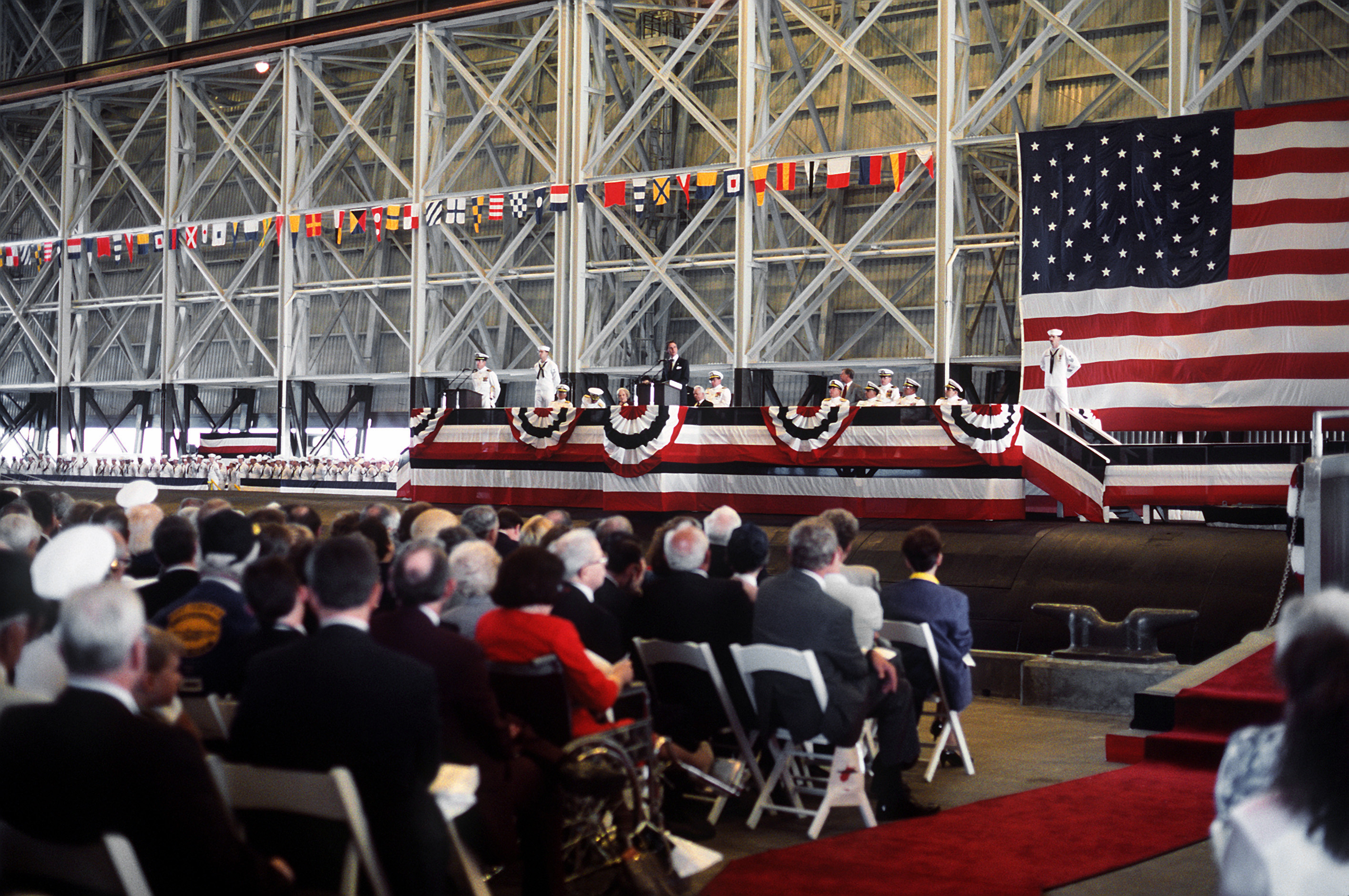
Caperton addresses the guests assembled for the commissioning ceremony of the USS West Virginia (SSBN-736) in 1990

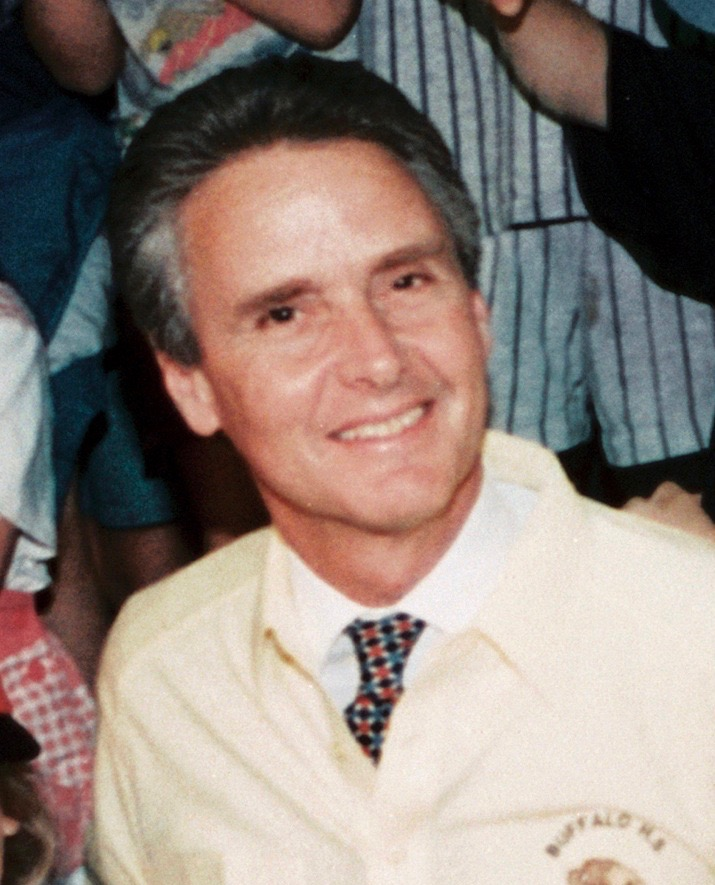
Caperton in 1996, during his second term as Governor

In the 1988 gubernatorial election, Caperton, initially considered a long-shot for his party's nomination, won a crowded primary in a narrow plurality over the 1984 nominee and Speaker of the State House Clyde M. See Jr. In the general election, again as an underdog, he unseated the Republican incumbent, Arch A. Moore Jr., by a surprising 17-point margin.

In the 1992 election, Caperton was challenged by State Senator Charlotte Pritt and then-state Attorney General Mario Palumbo in the Democratic primary. Caperton won the primary over Pritt and then the general election, defeating West Virginia Secretary of Agriculture Cleve Benedict, the Republican nominee, and Pritt, who ran as a write-in candidate.

Caperton was constitutionally prohibited from running for a third consecutive term in 1996. He ended up supporting the Republican nominee, former Governor Cecil Underwood, against Pritt, which led to a party split and bad feelings among some in the state party.

=== Financial policy ===
During his first term as the state's 31st governor, Caperton supported the passages of ethics, road-building, and education bills. He raised taxes in an effort to improve West Virginia's finances, thereby reducing debts exceeding $500 million and creating a $100 million surplus. Because of the reforms, Financial World magazine called the state the most improved in the nation. Critics accused Caperton of failing to keep a campaign promise not to raise taxes, but defenders claimed that the previous governor had misstated the condition of the state's finances and failed to disclose the need for tax increases.

=== Education policy ===
Publicly, Governor Caperton emphasized that education was his first priority. Caperton supported a school-building program that led to $800 million in investments for 58 new schools and 780 school renovations, directly benefiting two-thirds of West Virginia's public school students. After a brief strike by the state's public educators, Caperton raised teachers' salaries from 49th to 31st in the nation and trained more than 19,000 educators through a statewide Center for Professional Development with the goal of putting technology to its best use in West Virginia's classrooms. He encouraged the use of computers and technology in West Virginia public schools, resulting in the West Virginia Basic Skills Computer Program, which began with kindergarten and extended through sixth grade. His common refrain for "computers in every classroom" since has been expanded to include grades 7–12. In 1996, West Virginia's advances in education technology gained national recognition when Caperton received the Computerworld Smithsonian Award. Award sponsors called Caperton a "visionary" who "fundamentally changed the education system in America" by using technological innovations. Information about Caperton and his work is included in the Smithsonian's Permanent Research Collection. In January 1997, the magazine Education Week, conducted a study of the nation's education system and highlighted West Virginia for the state's use of technology in education.

=== Economic policy ===
As governor, Caperton focused his efforts on economic development, modern roads and infrastructure, prisons and jails, a clean environment, health care, and government management. West Virginia's economy improved during his eight-year tenure. Unemployment dropped from 9.8% to 6.2%, the result of creating approximately 86,000 new jobs. As part of his efforts to promote a clean environment, on August 13, 1992, Governor Gaston Caperton announced the creation of the West Virginia Streams Restoration Program, dedicated to treating acid drainage from coal mining.

=== National leadership roles ===
Near the end of his second term, Caperton was the 1996 chair of the Democratic Governors' Association, served on the National Governors' Association executive committee, and was a member of the Intergovernmental Policy Advisory Committee on U.S. Trade. He was chairman of the Appalachian Regional Commission, Southern Regional Education Board, and the Southern Growth Policy Board. Caperton has received numerous state and national awards and special recognition, including ten honorary doctoral degrees.

=== Tamarack ===
Another product of Caperton's tenure is the Tamarack, the Best of West Virginia. The facility is a museum, art gallery, and collection of studios for visiting artists that showcases products of West Virginia and organizes the state's "cottage industry." Tamarack is the center of an integrated distribution and marketing network for products by more than 1,200 West Virginia artists. The Rosen Group, publisher of Niche magazine, named Caperton the 1997 Humanitarian of the Year for creating a progressive market for the state's cottage industry.

== Post-gubernatorial career ==
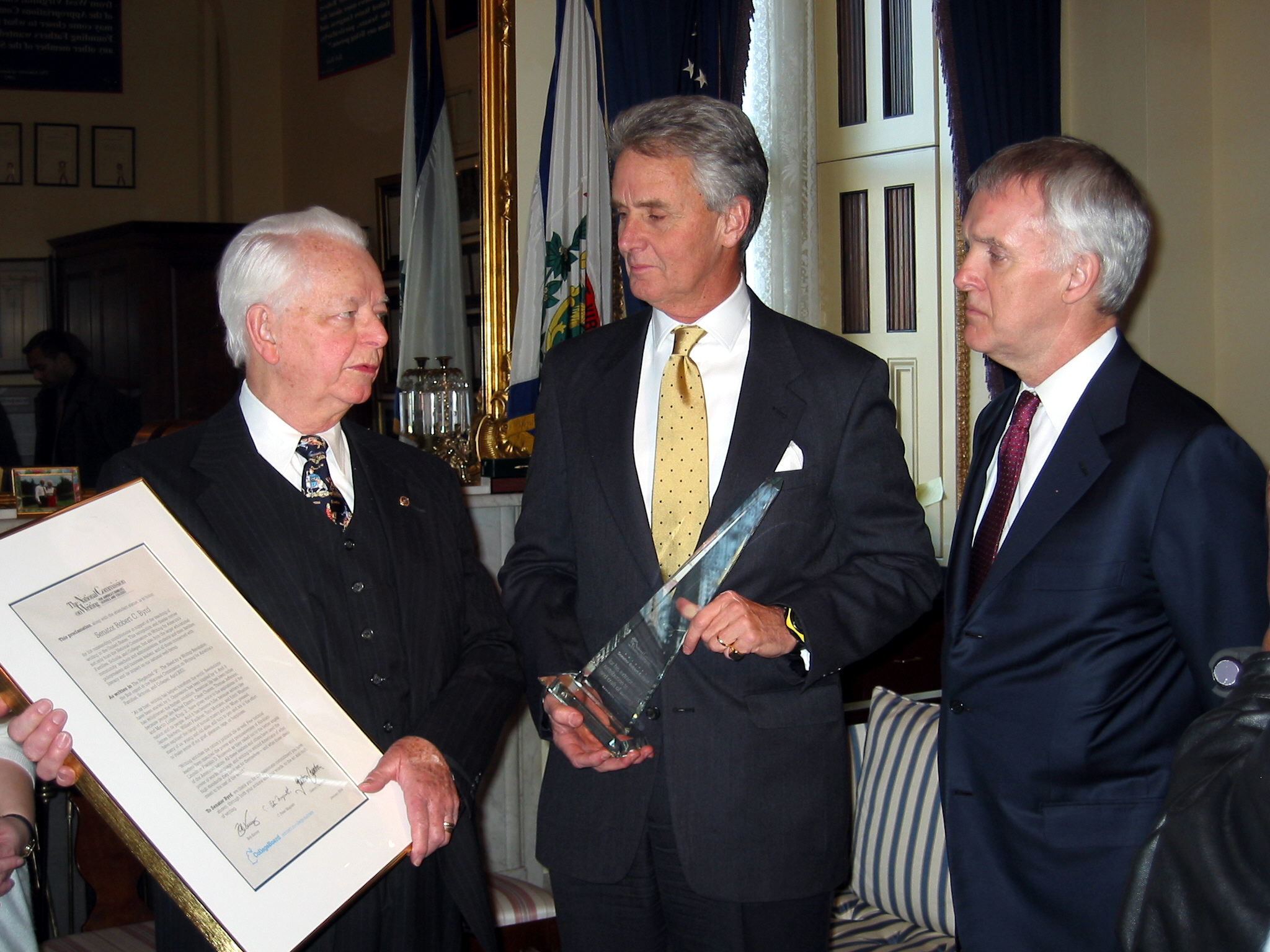
Caperton and Bob Kerrey present Robert Byrd with an award in 2004

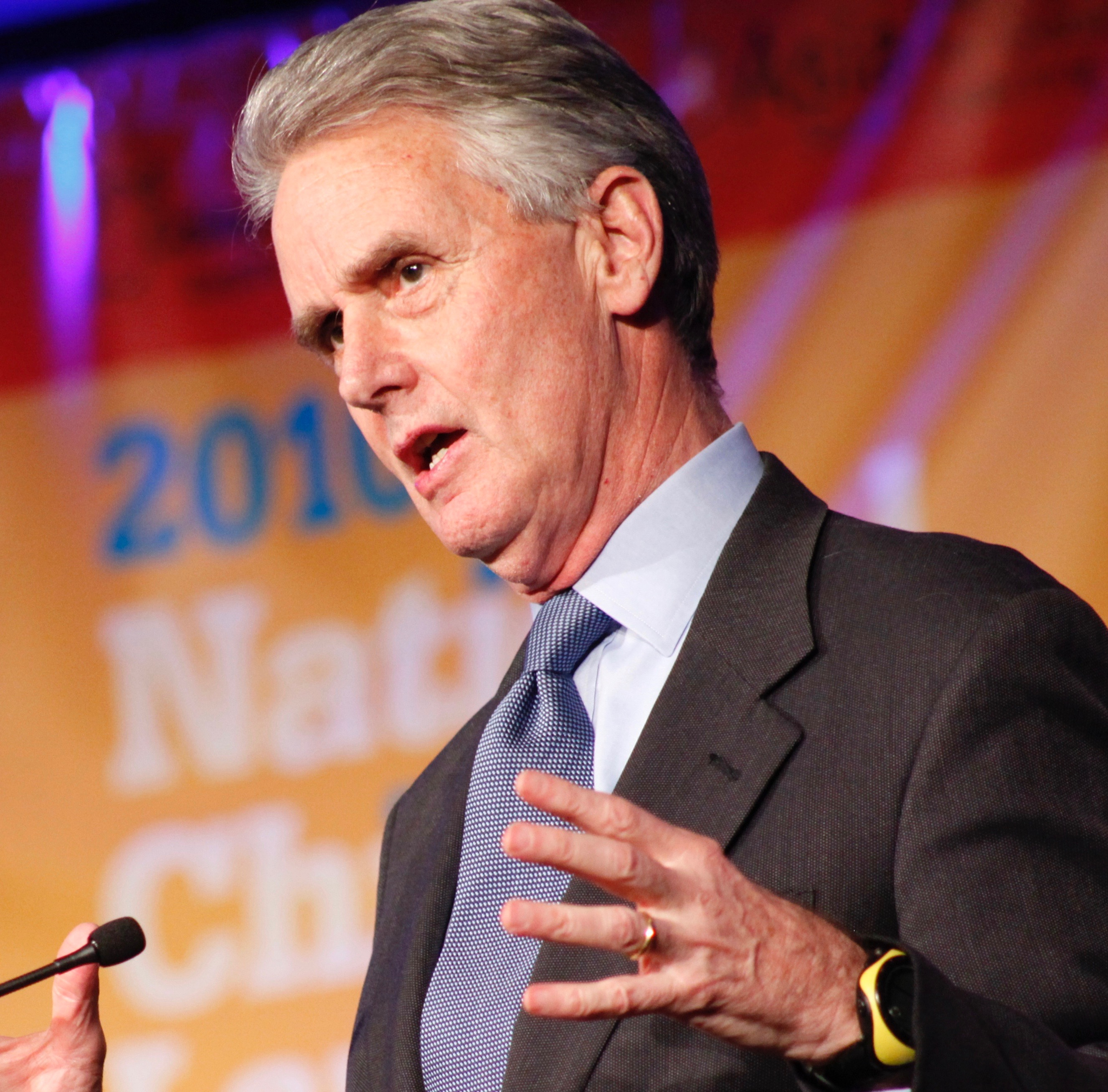
Caperton in 2010

After completing his second term, the former governor taught at Harvard University in the spring of 1997 as a fellow at the Harvard Institute of Politics. He founded the Institute on Education and Government at Columbia University.

Caperton became President and CEO of the College Board on July 1, 1999. The New York City based College Board is a nonprofit membership association of more than 4,200 schools, colleges and other educational institutions throughout America. The College Board is best known for its SAT college admissions exam and for its Advanced Placement Program, which offers high school students access to college-level course work. Since taking the helm of the College Board, Caperton has sought to enhance the standing and expand the reach of these two programs and to launch a series of initiatives. As a result of one of these initiatives, AP courses became more available to inner city and rural students.

Caperton expresses concern about unequal educational opportunity, and he led an effort to encourage students at middle schools to go to college, particularly the least advantaged. His efforts prompted USA Today to label him an "education crusader". The publication also named him one of the most influential people in America in its feature, "People to Watch: 2001."

In 2004, Caperton led a successful campaign to revise the SAT when the College Board's trustees requested changes to the test. The College Board introduced a set of changes to the SAT that include a writing test, more critical reading, and advanced math. The goal of the new SAT was to more closely reflect the coursework of the nation's high school students while maintaining what the Board describes as the test's level of rigor and excellence. The new SAT Reasoning Test was administered for the first time in March 2005.

Under Caperton's leadership, the College Board led an effort called "Don't Forget Ed!" that was designed to elevate education as an issue in the 2012 presidential campaign. As part of that effort, the College Board hosted a presidential candidate forum on October 27, 2011, called "The Future of American Education."

In 2012, Caperton wrote "The Achievable Dream: College Board Lessons on Creating Great Schools," a book that highlights specific lessons of educational success that can be replicated in schools across the country.

Caperton was reportedly among the top candidates to fill the remainder of the late Senator Robert Byrd's term. The appointment ultimately went to Carte Goodwin.

He is now the Vice Chairman for Leeds Equity Partners, a New York-based Private Equity firm focused solely on education. Caperton has worked in this capacity since January 2013.

== Personal life ==
William Gaston Caperton III was born in Charleston, Kanawha County. After attending Episcopal High School in Alexandria, Virginia, and the University of North Carolina, he returned to Charleston to manage a family-owned insurance firm.

Caperton has been married three times. He and his first wife, Ella Dee Caperton divorced in 1989 during his first term, and she later unsuccessfully ran for election for state treasurer. Caperton and Dee had two boys. She died in France on September 1, 2000.

Caperton's second wife was the musical director/conductor of the Wheeling Symphony Orchestra, Rachael Worby. They divorced in 1998.

In 2003, Caperton married his third wife, Israeli-American Idit Harel, an education technology expert, mother of three, and founder and CEO of MaMaMedia and Globaloria. She and Caperton divorced in 2012.

Party political offices
Preceded by Clyde See	Democratic nominee for Governor of West Virginia; 1988, 1992	Succeeded by Charlotte Pritt
Preceded by Mel Carnahan	Chair of the Democratic Governors Association; 1995–1996	Succeeded by Howard Dean
Political offices
Preceded by Arch Moore	Governor of West Virginia; 1989–1997	Succeeded by Cecil H. Underwood
U.S. order of precedence (ceremonial)
Preceded by Martha McSally as Former U.S. Senator	Order of precedence of the United States; Within West Virginia	Succeeded by Bob Wise as Former Governor
Preceded by Jeff Colyer as Former Governor	Order of precedence of the United States; Outside West Virginia	Succeeded by Bob Wise as Former Governor
