= Opal Wilcox Barron =

First Lady of West Virginia

- Born: September 19, 1914; Boyer, West Virginia, U.S.
- Died: September 11, 2010 (aged 95); Greenville, South Carolina, U.S.
- Known for: First Lady of West Virginia, 1961–1965
- Spouse: William Wallace Barron (m. 1936; died 2002)

Opal Wilcox Barron (September 19, 1914 – September 11, 2010) was First Lady of West Virginia from 1961 to 1965. She was born in Boyer, West Virginia.

She married William Wallace Barron on February 15, 1936, in Amherst, Virginia. William Barron held several offices in state government before finally serving as Governor of West Virginia from 1961 to 1965, during which time Opal Barron served as First Lady, promoting the state's centennial celebration and persuading her husband to initiate a campaign to conserve the forests and beautify the state.

In 1962, in the heat of the Cold War, she appeared on television to inform West Virginians how to equip and supply a fallout shelter. The entire family also participated in the Sabin vaccine program to prevent polio. After leaving office, Opal and William lived in Pompano Beach, Florida and Charlotte, North Carolina.

Following her husband's death, she lived in Greenville, South Carolina, where she died on September 11, 2010, shortly before her 96th birthday, following a period of declining health.

Honorary titles
Preceded by Hovah Hall Underwood	First Lady of West Virginia; 1961–1965	Succeeded by Mary Alice Tieche Smith
