= Sandra Casber Wise =

American lawyer

First Lady of West Virginia
- In role January 15, 2001 – January 17, 2005
- Governor: Bob Wise
- Preceded by: Hovah Hall Underwood
- Succeeded by: Gayle Conelly Manchin

Personal details
- Born: Sandra Casber; July 3, 1946 (age 80) Minneapolis, Minnesota, U.S.
- Spouse: Bob Wise (m. 1984)
- Children: 2
- Education: Macalester College (BA); University of Minnesota (JD)
- Occupation: Lawyer

Sandra Casber Wise (born July 3, 1946) is an American attorney and the wife of former Governor of West Virginia Bob Wise of West Virginia. During her husband's term as governor, Wise was the First Lady of West Virginia.

== Early life and education ==
She was born in Minneapolis, Minnesota on July 3, 1946. She earned a degree in political science from Macalester College and a J.D. degree from the University of Minnesota Law School.

== Career ==
While working as staff attorney with the United States House Committee on Ways and Means in the early-1980s, she met her future husband, Bob Wise. They married on July 28, 1984. While first lady, she traveled around the state to promote child literacy and to combat underage drinking.

Honorary titles
Preceded by Hovah Hall Underwood	First Lady of West Virginia; 2001 – 2005	Succeeded by Gayle Conelly Manchin
