= Mary Alice Tieche Smith =

- Born: Mary Alice Tieche; June 25, 1918; Beckley, West Virginia, U.S.
- Died: April 13, 1987 (aged 68); Beckley, West Virginia, U.S.
- Known for: First lady of West Virginia, 1965–1969
- Spouse: Hulett C. Smith (m. 1942)

Mary Alice Tieche Smith (June 25, 1918 – April 13, 1987) was the wife of former Governor of West Virginia, Hulett C. Smith and served as that state's First Lady from 1965 to 1969. She was born June 25, 1918, at Beckley, West Virginia. She attended Arlington Hall School in Washington, D.C., and Ward Belmont Junior College in Nashville, Tennessee. She married Hulett C. Smith in 1942. As first lady, she supervised a major renovation of the West Virginia Governor's Mansion and helped develop a brochure depicting the changes. She also promoted civic causes such as public health issues and Head Start early education programs. After leaving office, the Smiths returned to Beckley, where she died April 13, 1987.

Honorary titles
Preceded by Opal Wilcox Barron	First Lady of West Virginia; 1965 – 1969	Succeeded by Shelley Riley Moore
