= William M. O. Dawson =

American politician

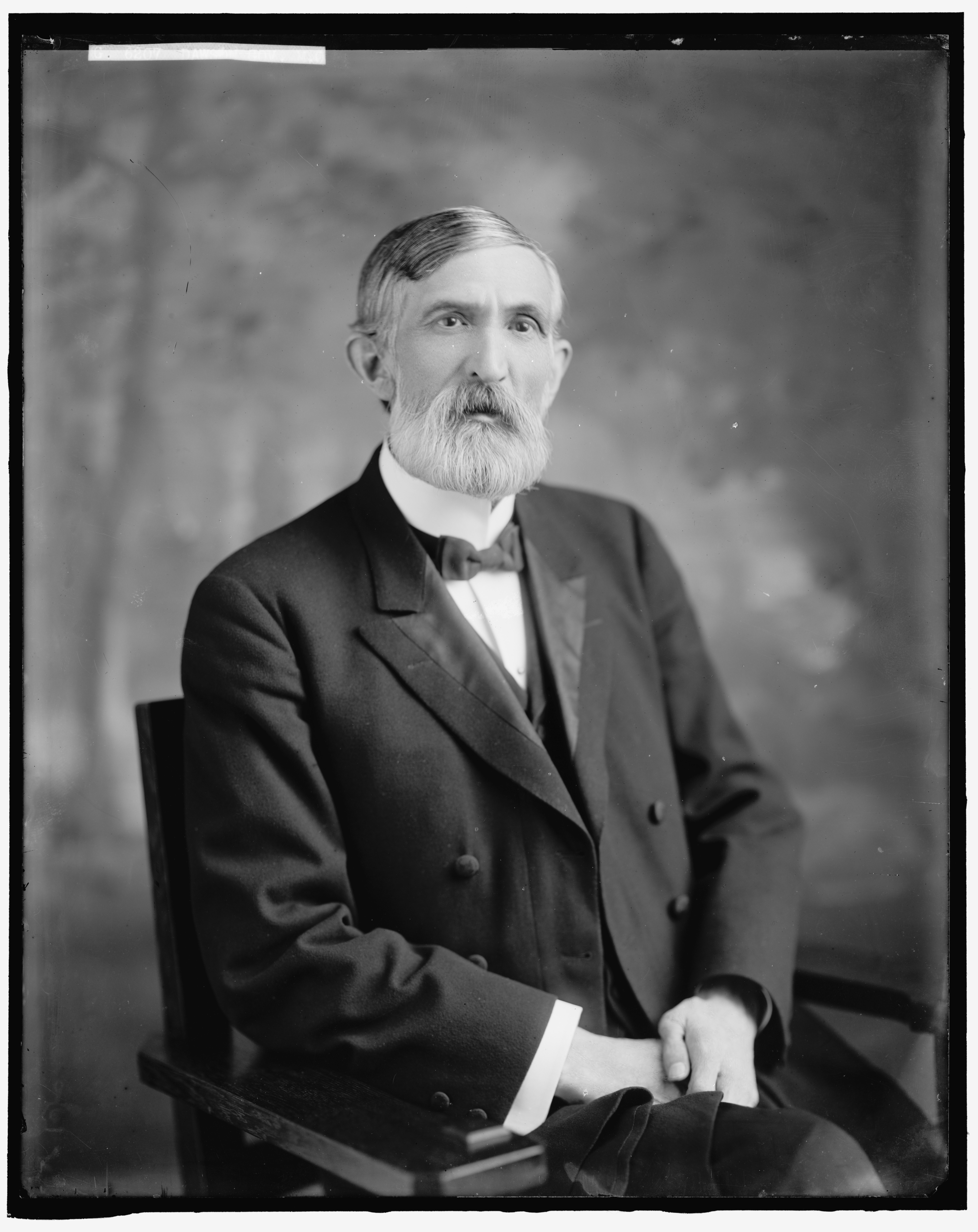

12th Governor of West Virginia
- In office March 4, 1905 – March 4, 1909
- Preceded by: Albert B. White
- Succeeded by: William E. Glasscock

Secretary of State of West Virginia
- In office 1897–1905
- Governor: George W. Atkinson; Albert B. White
- Preceded by: William E. Chilton
- Succeeded by: Charles W. Swisher

Personal details
- Born: May 21, 1853 Bloomington, Maryland
- Died: March 12, 1916 (aged 62) Charleston, West Virginia
- Party: Republican
- Spouses: Luda Neff (m. 1879, died) Maude Brown (m. 1899)
- Profession: Politician

William Mercer Owens Dawson (May 21, 1853 – March 12, 1916) was the 12th governor of West Virginia, serving from 1905 until 1909. A member of the Republican Party, he also served as Secretary of State of West Virginia from 1897 until 1905.

== Biography ==
William M. O. Dawson was born in Bloomington, Maryland on May 21, 1853.

His parents were Francis Ravenscraft Dawson and Leah (Knight) Dawson, and after his mother's death moved as a child with his father to Western Virginia. Dawson was educated in the public schools and was the last governor not to have a college education. He taught school for a time. In 1873 he moved to Kingwood WV and became editor, and later, owner of the weekly Preston County Journal.

He married Luda Neff in 1879. After her death, he remarried to Maude Brown in 1899.

He died in Charleston, West Virginia on March 12, 1916.

Party political offices
Preceded by Albert B. White	Republican nominee for Governor of West Virginia; 1904	Succeeded by William E. Glasscock
Political offices
Preceded by William E. Chilton	Secretary of State of West Virginia; 1897–1905	Succeeded by Charles Wesley Swisher
Preceded by Albert B. White	Governor of West Virginia; 1905–1909	Succeeded by William E. Glasscock
