= Albert B. White =

American politician (1856–1941)

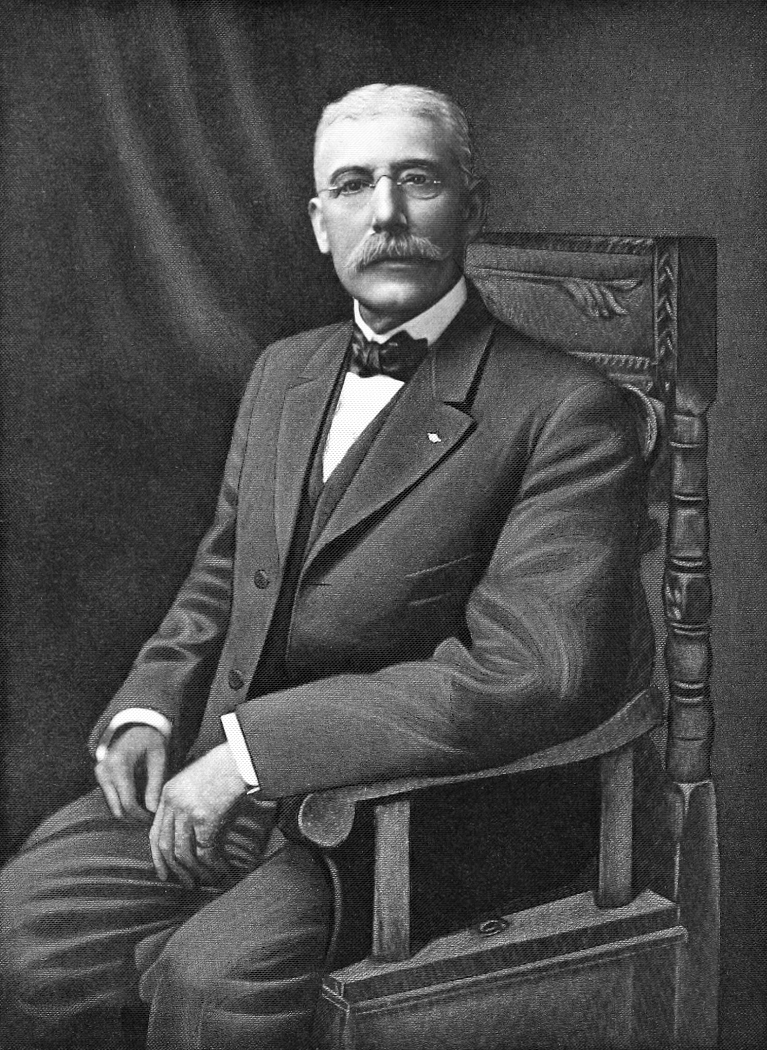

11th Governor of West Virginia
- In office March 4, 1901 – March 4, 1905
- Preceded by: George W. Atkinson
- Succeeded by: William M. O. Dawson

Personal details
- Born: September 22, 1856 Cleveland, Ohio, U.S.
- Died: July 3, 1941 (aged 84) Parkersburg, West Virginia, U.S.
- Party: Republican
- Spouse: Agnes Ward White

Albert Blakeslee White (September 22, 1856 – July 3, 1941) was the 11th governor of West Virginia from 1901 to 1905.

White was educated in the public schools of Colombus, Ohio. In 1878, he graduated from Marietta College. In 1879, he married Agnes Ward. White began his career in journalism as a managing editor in Lafayette, Indiana and relocated to Parkersburg, West Virginia (Wood County) in 1881. He continued to work as a politically powerful editor in Parkerburg until 1889.

In 1889, White was appointed by President Benjamin Harrison as collector of internal revenue for West Virginia. He was later reappointed by President William McKinley in 1897.

In 1900, White was the Republican nominee for Governor of West Virginia and defeated Democrat John H. Holt by 19156 votes.

In 1916, White failed to win the Republican nomination for the US Senate having been defeated by Howard Sutherland; however, he later was elected to the West Virginia Senate.

White died in Parkersburg in 1941.

Party political offices
| Preceded by George W. Atkinson | Republican nominee for Governor of West Virginia; 1900 | Succeeded by William M. O. Dawson |
Political offices
| Preceded by George W. Atkinson | Governor of West Virginia; 1901–1905 | Succeeded by William M. O. Dawson |
