= Dee Kessel Caperton =

American politician (1943–2000)

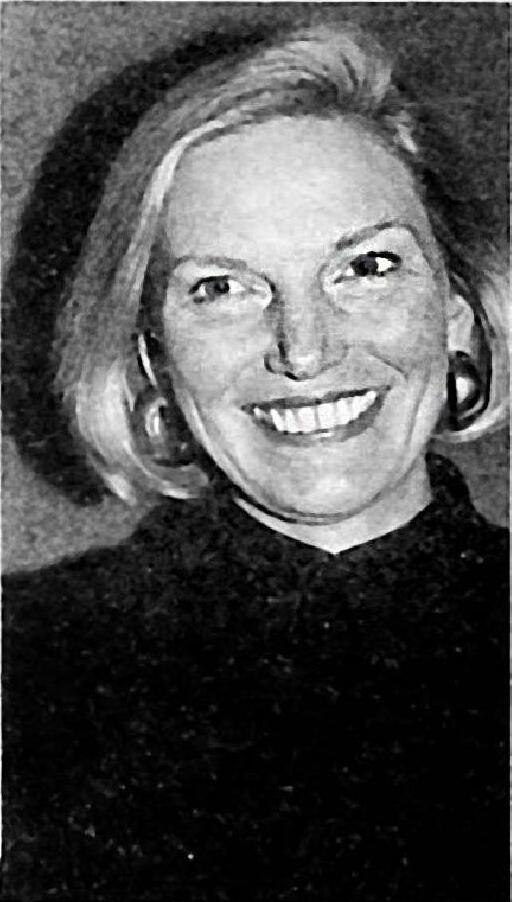
- Kessel Caperton in 1987

First Lady of West Virginia
- In role January 16, 1989 – October 23, 1989
- Governor: Gaston Caperton
- Preceded by: Shelley Riley Moore
- Succeeded by: Rachael Worby

Member of the West Virginia House of Delegates from the 23rd district
- In office December 1, 1986 – December 1, 1988

Personal details
- Born: Ella Dee Kessel; February 26, 1943 Ripley, West Virginia, U.S.
- Died: September 1, 2000 (aged 57) St. Remy, France
- Spouse: Gaston Caperton (m. 1965; div. 1989)
- Education: West Virginia University; University of Pittsburgh
- Known for: Miss West Virginia, First lady of West Virginia, 1989–90

Ella Dee Kessel Caperton (née Kessel; February 26, 1943 – September 1, 2000) was an American politician who served as First Lady of West Virginia, served a term in the West Virginia House of Delegates and was once Miss West Virginia. She was the ex-wife of former West Virginia Governor Gaston Caperton and the daughter of former Jackson County Circuit Court Judge and West Virginia Supreme Court Justice Oliver Kessel.

Caperton served a single term in the West Virginia House of Delegates before retiring to help her husband's campaign for governor. She and her husband divorced while he was in office and filed a lawsuit against him over finances. After the divorce was finalized, she ran for West Virginia State Treasurer in 1990 but was defeated in the primary. Afterwards, she moved to France where she ran a hotel until her death from cancer in 2000.

== Early life ==
A Ripley, West Virginia native, Ella Dee Kessel was born on February 26, 1943. She was the daughter of Kate and Oliver Kessel. Her father was a justice on the West Virginia Supreme Court. She held a degree in music from West Virginia University, a master's degree in education from the West Virginia College of Graduate Studies, and a Doctorate in Education from the University of Pittsburgh. She was Miss West Virginia in 1964 and the second runner-up in the Miss America pageant. She married Gaston Caperton in 1965. The couple had two sons, W.G. (Gat) Caperton, and John Ambler Caperton.

== Career ==
In 1965, Caperton worked as a receptionist in Kanawaha Banking and Trust Co. She had previously worked as a bookkeeper in two banks in Ripley. In 1974, she worked as an interior decorator. In 1984, she served as a member of the Board of Trustees for the University of Charleston and participated in a cultural exchange program where she taught English in China for a semester. Also in 1984, she was a delegate to the Democratic National Convention. In 1986 Caperton was elected to the West Virginia House of Delegates for a two-year term. Her primary race was the most expensive house campaign that cycle, totaling over $30,000 spent.

== First Lady of West Virginia ==
Caperton did not seek reelection in 1988 in order to campaign statewide for her husband's campaign for governor. She had considered a bid for the governorship but passed on it, fearing a woman would be unable to defeat incumbent Arch Moore. After becoming First Lady in 1989, she became the first First Lady of West Virginia to have her own office in the State Capitol. As First Lady, she focused on education, children, and women's issues.

On June 8, 1989, Governor Caperton announced his and his wife's divorce. On August 17, 1989, Caperton sued her husband for $12 million, claiming she had been forced to sell market shares below value for political reasons. The divorce was granted on October 24, 1989, as a no-fault divorce, and the lawsuit filed against her husband was settled out of court. It had been reported the settlement was for $11 million, though neither party had been willing to confirm specifics.

=== Treasurer bid ===
After the divorce, she conceded she had considered a political comeback, mentioning a possible bid for the Mayor of Charleston. On January 22, 1990, she announced her candidacy for West Virginia State Treasurer that year. Should she have been elected to office, she would have worked alongside her ex-husband in dictating how to use state money. The race was marred by speculation that Caperton would challenge her husband's re-election bid in 1992, though she denied this. She also denied any friction working with her ex-husband, claiming they were on friendly terms. Despite reportedly leaving events when he knew his ex-wife was present, Governor Caperton made no efforts to stifle her campaign. However, much of his staff supported former treasurer Larrie Bailey. Her opponents criticized her candidacy and charged her election would generate negative publicity for the state, particularly after the scandal surrounding previous Treasurer A. James Manchin. She also faced criticism for her wealth and lack of experience. Caperton was defeated by former Treasurer Bailey by under 15,000 votes in the primary. She outspent Bailey, spending $239,000 to Bailey's $6,100.

== Death ==
After losing the treasurer's race, Caperton moved to France, where she operated a small hotel in Saint-Remy. She died in France on September 1, 2000, aged 57, from cancer. Her estate gave $600,000 to set up a fund for children. In 2016, a commemorative doll of Caperton was unveiled, with former Governor Caperton and her son Gat in attendance.

Honorary titles
Preceded by Shelley Riley Moore	First Lady of West Virginia; 1989	Succeeded by Rachael Worby
