= Bob Wise =

American politician (born 1948)

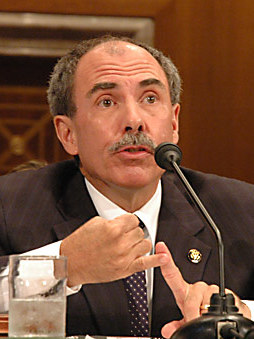
- Wise in 2008

33rd Governor of West Virginia
- In office January 15, 2001 – January 17, 2005
- Lieutenant: Earl Ray Tomblin
- Preceded by: Cecil H. Underwood
- Succeeded by: Joe Manchin

Member of the U.S. House of Representatives from West Virginia
- In office January 3, 1983 – January 3, 2001
- Preceded by: Mick Staton
- Succeeded by: Shelley Moore Capito
- Constituency: 3rd district (1983–1993); 2nd district (1993–2001)

Member of the West Virginia Senate from the 17th district
- In office December 1, 1980 – December 9, 1982
- Preceded by: William T. Brotherton Jr.
- Succeeded by: Tod Kaufman

Personal details
- Born: Robert Ellsworth Wise Jr. January 6, 1948 (age 78) Washington, D.C., U.S.
- Party: Democratic
- Spouse: Sandra Casber (m. 1984)
- Children: 2
- Education: Duke University (BA); Tulane University (JD)

Robert Ellsworth Wise Jr. (born January 6, 1948) is an American politician who served as the 33rd governor of West Virginia from 2001 to 2005. A member of the Democratic Party, Wise also served in the United States House of Representatives from 1983 until 2001. In 2005 Wise became the president of the Alliance for Excellent Education, a nonprofit organization that focuses on reforming the nation's high schools.

== Early life, education, and legal career ==
Wise was born on January 6, 1948. He was raised in the Kanawha Valley of Kanawha County, West Virginia, with his two sisters and attended George Washington High School in nearby Charleston. His father worked in insurance, for McDonough Caperton Group, for thirty years. Wise ran track and field in high school – the half-mile and mile – and was elected vice president of the student body. Wise has won every election he's been in since then.

Wise enrolled at Duke University in 1966, graduating with a Bachelor of Arts in Political Science four years later. After leaving Duke, Wise applied to law school, working as an aide in a California mental health facility until he was accepted at the University of Houston. Wise relocated to Texas for his studies, eventually transferring to the Tulane University School of Law. He waited tables in New Orleans, working nightshifts while he obtained his Juris Doctor.

Wise graduated from Tulane in 1975 and opened his first law practice in Charleston. In his early days as a lawyer Wise helped create West Virginians for a Fair and Equitable Assessment of Taxes (FEAT), a group interested in property tax reform. Wise also advocated for coal miners seeking workers compensation and supported community renewal efforts for the 1972 Buffalo Creek disaster victims. In 1978, he once more helped with redevelopment issues for those affected by the Mingo County Floods.

== West Virginia State Senate (1980–1982) ==
Wise began his political career in 1980, running for public office against State Senate President William Brotherton in the County Democratic primary in Kanawha. With endorsement from the West Virginia Education Association and other West Virginian labor organizations, Wise defeated Brotherton in an upset primary election and went on to win the general election in November, gaining a seat in the West Virginia Senate.

In his early days on the political scene, Wise was noted for having a lively campaign style, especially at rallies, and was referred to as "the Boy Wonder of West Virginia politics” by the Charleston Daily Mail in 1982.

== U.S. House of Representatives (1983–2001) ==
In 1982, Bob Wise ran for the United States Congress. He came out of a highly competitive Democratic primary victorious and continued on to beat incumbent Republican congressman Mick Staton with 58 percent of the vote.

Wise's win against Staton would be the first of nine consecutive elections to the U.S. House of Representatives. During his 18-year turn (1983 – 2001) in the House, Wise ran once unopposed, in 1990, and had majorities as high as 74 percent – in 1988, against Republican Paul Hart – and 64 percent – in 1994 against Republican Samuel Cravotta.

While he was a member of Congress, Wise held such posts as regional whip, at-large whip, and parliamentarian. He represented the Second Congressional District which reaches from Harpers Ferry to the Ohio River and is considered to be one of the largest Districts eastward of the Mississippi River. In this same period Wise joined the Transportation and Infrastructure Committee, which allowed him to obtain federal aid for road projects in West Virginia.

During his time in congress, Wise also served as a member on the House Committee on Education and Labor and on the Democratic Party Leadership team. Among his biggest achievements during this time were the Chemical Right to Know legislation, the Wise Amendment to the Clean Air Act, and the Federal Mental Health Parity legislation.

It was during Wise's time in congress that another West Virginian, and at one time the longest-serving member of Congress, Robert C. Byrd, called Wise “a steam engine with britches,” referring to Wise's tireless dedication and service to his constituents.

== Governor of West Virginia (2001–2005) ==
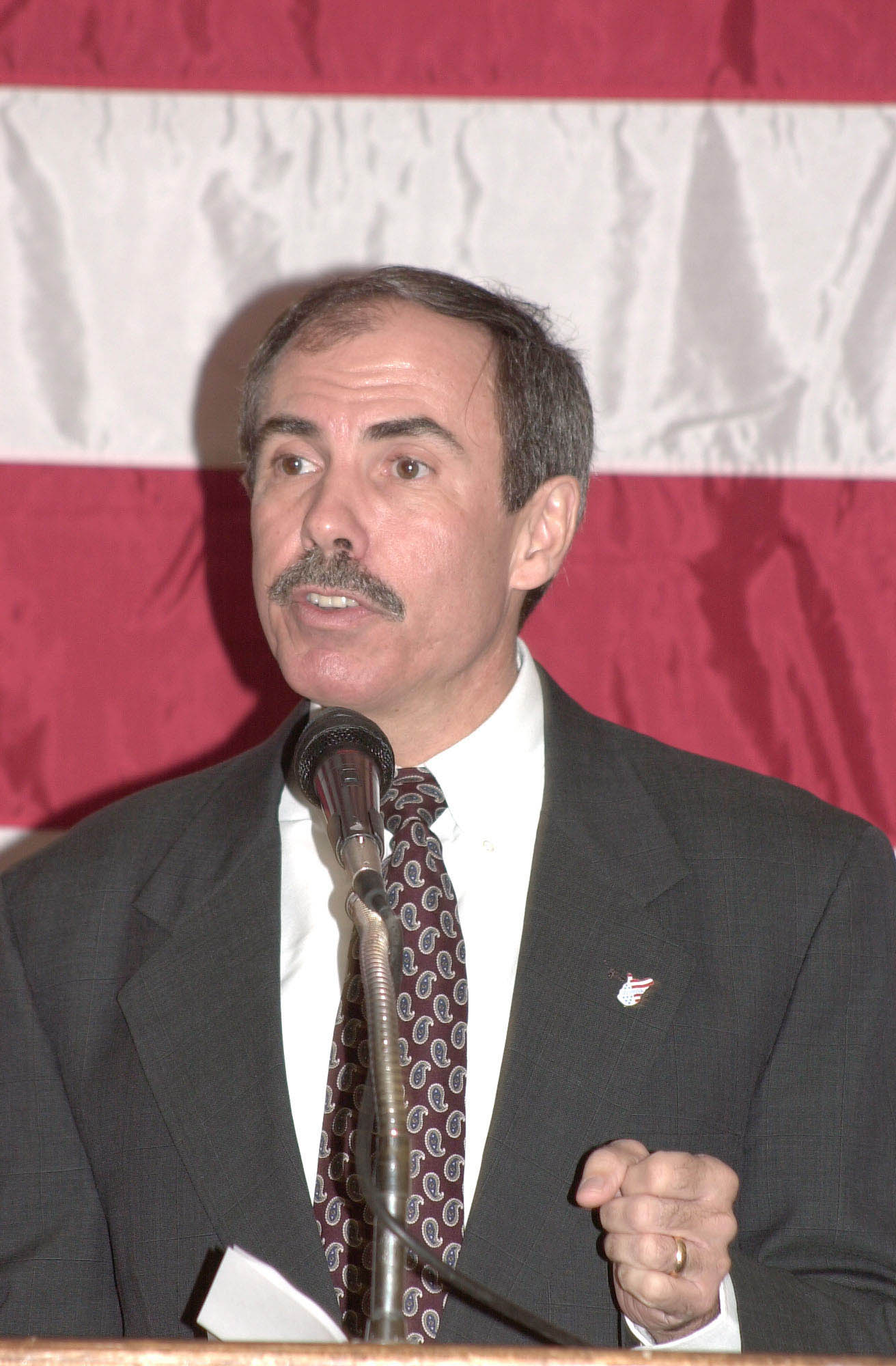
Gov. Wise speaks at a news conference in January 2002

=== Campaign and early days ===
In 2000, after 18 years in congress, Bob Wise left his now secure seat and returned to West Virginia to win the Democratic Primary for governorship with 63 percent of the vote. Wise then went on to challenge Republican incumbent Cecil H. Underwood. Wise highlighted the economy, education, health care, and the energy industry in his campaign speeches. In the end, Wise got just over 50 percent of the vote while Underwood received 47.

Wise was sworn in as governor on January 15, 2001, by Circuit Judge Dan O'Hanlon. In his inauguration speech, Wise spoke once more of improving health care and education as well as turning the economy around. Shortly after taking the position of governor, Wise had to deal with widespread flooding in record amounts throughout southern West Virginia.

=== Education and Promise Scholarship ===
Given a wide berth by the legislature for his handling of the flooding, Wise was able to move forward with his education and health care agendas. In education, Wise pushed for the funding of his Promise (Providing Real Opportunities for Maximizing Instate Student Excellence) scholarships. The program was funded through video lottery revenue, and inspired by the HOPE scholarship program in Georgia.

The first Promise scholarships were awarded in 2002 and provided full tuition for students with at least a 3.0 grade point average in high school and a combined SAT Reasoning Test score of 1,000 to attend a state college, university, or in-state private college. By requiring students who'd received the scholarship to complete at least 30 credits per year in order to stay eligible; Promise improved four year graduation rates by 7 percent and the percentage of students leaving the state to pursue post-secondary degrees dropped to the lowest levels since the mid-1990s.

In recent years, the now decade-old scholarship has been threatened budget cuts from the state legislature. Formerly a means of paying full tuition, the scholarship now covers $4,750 in a state where the average tuition is upwards of $6,000. There are currently 10,000 students in West Virginia attending college through the Promise scholarship.

Wise was the first governor to propose full funding for the Higher Education Grant Program. Wise also set up the Governor's Hotline for Safer Schools, and put forward legislation to bring a in pre-Kindergarten programs that would cover all the state's four-year-olds.

=== Other achievements as governor ===
As governor, Wise was able to widen enrollment in the federal Children's Health Insurance Program. The CHIP Program allowed the children of families making less than $34,000 a year to be eligible for health insurance.

Wise faced continual budget pressures throughout his governorship. These included road work and construction costs, school expenses, the state's operating budget and teacher salaries. Halfway through his first term as governor, recession hit the United States economy and Wise introduced spending cuts of 10 percent to deal with demands on state revenue while still attempting to make improvements to infrastructure and reduce long-term debt.

Wise also attempted to attract businesses through an extensive tax and infrastructure assistance program. In one instance, the state issued $215 million in grants to spur $1 billion investment in projects, such as the Blanchette Rockefeller Neurosciences Institute, Cabela's, the Marshall University Biotechnology Development Center and the West Virginia High Technology Consortium. Wise also turned his attention to mountaintop removal practices and malpractice insurance costs during this period.

In December 2002, Wise was elected chairman of the Southern Governors Association during his gubernatorial term and the following year. Charleston hosted the governors' annual meeting for the first time in 40 years. Wise was also chaired the National Governors Association Committee on Natural Resources and the Southern States Energy Board.

=== Extramarital affair ===
In 2003, Wise admitted to an affair with a married woman and stated that he would not seek reelection in 2004. He went on to “apologize deeply to the people of our state for my actions. In my private life, I have let many people down." Philip Frye, the husband of Angela Mascia-Frye, 35, a state worker, filed for divorce April 7, 2003, claiming she'd had an affair with Governor Wise.

Wise's successor as governor, Secretary of State Joe Manchin, had already announced that he would oppose Wise in the primary election before the infidelity came to light. Manchin easily won the nomination and then the general election. On August 4, 2003, in an interview on The Daily Show before Wise's withdrawal, Phillip Frye told Rob Corddry that he was running for governor, despite being unqualified, to be a nuisance to Wise.

== Post-political career ==
=== Alliance for Excellent Education ===
Since 2005, Wise has been president of Alliance for Excellent Education, a nonprofit advocacy organization dedicated to ensuring that all students, particularly those who are traditionally underserved, graduate from high school ready for success in college, work, and citizenship. The Alliance was founded in 1999 by Gerard and Lilo Leeds and is based in Washington, DC.

=== National Board of Professional Teaching Standards ===
From 2009 to 2015, Bob Wise served as the Chairman of the Board of the National Board for Professional Teaching Standards. The National Board is an organization that seeks to promote and establish standards of excellence in teaching nationwide. It grew out of a 1983 report from the National Commission on Excellence in Education entitled A Nation at Risk. The report detailed a strong decline in America's educational standards and performance. The report concentrated on the need for a foundational overhaul of the education system in the United States.

In November 2012, the Harvard University Center for Education Policy Research announced new data that confirmed National Board-certified teachers outperformed non-certified teachers in elementary math and English Language Arts.

=== Other achievements in education ===
Since his involvement with the AEE and NBPTS, Gov. Wise has become an in-demand speaker on education issues. He serves in an advisory capacity to the U.S. Department of Education, White House, the U.S. Congress, and National High School Center.

In 2010, along with former Florida Governor Jeb Bush, Wise put together the Digital Learning Council. The Council was made up of leaders in the field of education from all over the United States. The group met for several months and then released the study “10 Elements of High Quality Digital Learning.”

The following year, Wise was included in the Non Profit Time's “Power & Influence Top 50” list of executives in the nonprofit sector. Alongside the AEE and the NBPTS, the former governor also serves on the Council for the Accreditation of Educator Preparation and Performance Reporting which puts together rigorous accreditation standards for teacher preparation, the Gordon Commission, a commission of experts formed to examine the future of education, and the Business Roundtable's Springboard Project which makes policy recommendations for equipping Americans with the skills they need to make in today's workforce.

Wise received the Corporation for Public Broadcasting's Thought Leader Award in 2013. The award is given to U.S. leaders who “affirm the essential services that public media provides to citizens in areas of education, journalism, and the arts.” In 2012, he was given the Charles W. Eliot Award from the New England Association of Schools and Colleges for his initiatives in education policy and in 2011 he received the National Association of State Boards of Education's Friend of Education Award. That same year he was inducted into Marshall University's June Harless Hall of Fame for establishing the PROMISE scholarship.

=== C-Change ===
Bob Wise was diagnosed with prostate cancer and had surgery in 1999. As a survivor, the former governor has long been a participant in the fight against cancer. In 2007, Members of the American Cancer Society gave Wise a ribbon in honor of his fight for survival as well as for increases on outdated tobacco taxes. "There is really no excuse," Wise said on that occasion, advocating for basic procedures to detect cancer. "I am fascinated by all of the excuses we make for not doing it."

Wise presently chairs, along with Mike Krzyzewski of Duke University, the national Board of Directors of C-Change. C-Change is an organization fighting to eliminate cancer by utilizing the resources of its private, public, and not-for-profit membership. The organization's Board of Directors has 22 members and operates in the style of a town hall meeting in which various leaders in the fight on the disease gather several times year to discuss cancer-related topics.

Wise also serves on the board of advisors for the Moffitt Cancer Center.

=== Campaign finance reform ===
Wise is a member of the ReFormers Caucus of Issue One, whose website describes it as "...the largest bipartisan group of former members of Congress and governors ever assembled on behalf of money-in-politics reform."

== Personal life ==
During his time in Congress, Bob Wise met and later married Sandra Casber Wise, who was serving as counsel to the House Ways and Means Committee at the time. The couple have a son, Robert, and a daughter, Alexandra. The former governor has a black belt in Tae Kwon Do. He and his wife live in Washington, DC. In 2015, North Carolina State University honored Wise with the William and Ida Friday Institute for Educational Innovation's Friday Medal which recognizes significant, distinguished and enduring contributions to education through advocating innovation, advancing education and imparting inspiration.

U.S. House of Representatives
Preceded by Mick Staton	Member of the U.S. House of Representatives from West Virginia's 3rd congressional district 1983–1993	Succeeded by Nick Rahall
Preceded by Harley O. Staggers Jr.	Member of the U.S. House of Representatives from West Virginia's 2nd congressional district 1993–2001	Succeeded by Shelley Moore Capito
Party political offices
Preceded by Charlotte Pritt	Democratic nominee for Governor of West Virginia; 2000	Succeeded by Joe Manchin
Political offices
Preceded by Cecil H. Underwood	Governor of West Virginia; 2001–2005	Succeeded by Joe Manchin
U.S. order of precedence (ceremonial)
Preceded by Gaston Caperton as Former Governor	Order of precedence of the United States	Succeeded by Earl Ray Tomblin as Former Governor
