= West Virginia Department of Education =

State agency of West Virginia

Agency overview
- Formed: 1863
- Jurisdiction: State of West Virginia
- Headquarters: 1900 Kanawha Boulevard East Charleston, West Virginia 25305
- Agency executive: Michele L. Blatt, State Superintendent of Schools
- Website: www.wvde.us

The West Virginia Department of Education is the state education agency of West Virginia. It is headquartered in Charleston.

== History ==
The original West Virginia Constitution of 1863 established a system of free public schools. This was when the State attempted to introduce the township system in West Virginia, and each township was to be divided into sub-districts, the level where school affairs would be handled. The West Virginia Constitution of 1872 dismantled the township system, though the State would remain divided into 398 school districts until the County Unit Plan was approved in 1933, which organized schools at the county level.

The West Virginia Board of Education was established in 1908. At that time, the Board's members were appointed by the Superintendent, which was an elected position. In 1958, a constitutional amendment made the Board a constitutional body, and changed the office of Superintendent from an elected to an appointed position.

== West Virginia Board of Education ==
Currently, the West Virginia Board of Education is made up of nine citizens appointed by the Governor, who serve nine year terms, and two non-voting ex officio members, the State Superintendent of Schools, the Chancellor of the West Virginia Higher Education Policy Commission, and the Chancellor of Community and Technical College Education.

The Board has the power to establish policies and rules over the State's public schools that carry into effect legislation passed regarding public education, as well as general supervision of the West Virginia Schools for the Deaf and Blind.

The Current members of the West Virginia Board of Education are as follows

- L. Paul Hardesty, President
- Nancy J. White, Vice President
- F. Scott Rotruck, Financial Officer
- Robert W. Dunlevy, Member
- Victor L. Gabriel, Member
- Cathy Justice, Member
- Christopher A. Stansbury, OD, Member
- Debra K. Sullivan, Member
- James S. Wilson, DDS, Member

=== Ex Officio Members ===
- Michele L. Blatt, State Superintendent of Schools
- Sarah Armstrong Tucker, Chancellor of Community and Technical College Education, interim Chancellor of the West Virginia Higher Education Policy Commission
