= List of Phi Delta Phi members =

Phi Delta Phi is an international legal honor society and the oldest legal organization in continuous existence in the United States. Founded in 1869 at the University of Michigan as a professional fraternity, it became an honor society in 2012. Following is a list of some of the notable members of Phi Delta Phi

== Academia ==
- Mary P. Easley, faculty at North Carolina Central University and North Carolina State University and First Lady of North Carolina
- José Gomez Gordoa, rector of the Escuela Libre de Derecho and Mexican ambassador to Spain
- Leon Green, dean of Northwestern University School of Law for 38 years
- Alfred Hayes Jr., professor of law at the Cornell Law School and lawyer
- Peter Hogg, dean and professor of law at Osgoode Hall Law School in Toronto
- Ben F. Johnson, dean of the Emory University School of Law, dean of the Georgia State University College of Law, and Georgia State Senate,
- Blewett Harrison Lee, legal scholar and corporate attorney who taught at the Northwestern University Law School and University of Chicago Law School
- Karl Llewellyn, faculty of Columbia Law School and the University of Chicago Law School
- John O. Moseley, president of Central State College and the University of Nevada, Reno
- William Lloyd Prosser, dean of the School of Law at the University of California, Berkeley
- Paul L. Selby, dean and professor emeritus of law at the West Virginia University College of Law

== Attorney General ==
- Ashtar Ausaf Ali, Attorney General for Pakistan
- Pamela Carter, Indiana Attorney General
- George Couper Gibbs, Florida Attorney General and judge of the Fourth Judicial Circuit Court of Florida
- Edwin Meese, United States Attorney General
- William French Smith, United States Attorney General
- Edwin K. Steers, Attorney General of Indiana

== Business ==
- Shelby Bryan, telecommunications pioneer, futurist, business executive, entrepreneur, and venture capitalist
- Orion H. Cheney, banker, New York State Comptroller, and New York Superintendent of Banks
- Elwood Haynes, inventor, metallurgist, automotive pioneer, and industrialist
- William H. H. Moore, president of the Atlantic Mutual Insurance Company
- Aaron Titlow, attorney, hotelier, and developer of Titlow Beach

== Entertainment ==
- Marie Sarantakis, lawyer and cast member of Divorce Court

== Government ==
- Raymond Adam Kline, deputy and acting administrator of the General Services Administration and associate administrator of NASA
- Bob Ricks, agent of the Federal Bureau of Investigation and Oklahoma Secretary of Safety and Security

== Judiciary ==
=== National Supreme Court ===
- Rosalie Abella, justice of the Supreme Court of Canada
- Louise Arbour, justice of the Supreme Court of Canada and the Court of Appeal for Ontario
- W. Ian Binnie, justice of the Supreme Court of Canada
- Hugo Black, Associate Justice of the Supreme Court of the United States
- William J. Brennan Jr., Associate Justice of the Supreme Court of the United States
- Benjamin N. Cardozo, Associate Justice of the Supreme Court of the United States
- Genaro David Góngora, president of the Supreme Court of Justice of the Nation (Mexico)
- Christine Hohmann-Dennhardt, justice of the Federal Constitutional Court (Germany)
- Charles Evans Hughes, Chief Justice of the United States, United States Secretary of State, and Governor of New York
- Elias Finley Johnson, Associate Justice of the Supreme Court of the Philippines and Ohio House of Representatives
- Anthony Kennedy, Associate Justice of the Supreme Court of the United States
- Claire L’Heureux-Dubé, Judge of the Supreme Court of Canada
- Margarita Beatriz Luna, minister of the Supreme Court of Justice of the Nation (Mexico)
- Thurgood Marshall, Associate Justice of the Supreme Court of the United States
- Beverley McLachlin, Chief Justice of Canada
- Sandra Day O’Connor, Associate Justice of the Supreme Court of the United States and Arizona Senate
- Alberto Pérez Dayán, Associate Justice of the Supreme Court of Justice of the Nation (Mexico)
- Lewis F. Powell Jr., Associate Justice of the Supreme Court of the United States
- William Rehnquist, Chief Justice of the United States
- Owen Roberts, Associate Justice of the Supreme Court of the United States
- Antonin Scalia, Associate Justice of the Supreme Court of the United States
- John Paul Stevens, Associate Justice of the Supreme Court of the United States
- Potter Stewart, Associate Justice of the Supreme Court of the United States
- Earl Warren, Chief Justice of the United States and Governor of California and
- Byron White, Associate Justice of the Supreme Court of the United States and professional football player

=== Federal court ===
- Rhesa Barksdale, Senior Judge of the United States Court of Appeals for the Fifth Circuit
- Ellen Bree Burns, Senior Judge of the United States District Court for the District of Connecticut
- Albert J. Engel Jr., Senior Judge of the United States Court of Appeals for the Sixth Circuit
- Joyce Hens Green, Senior Judge of the United States District Court for the District of Columbia and presiding judge of the United States Foreign Intelligence Surveillance Court
- Thomas Penfield Jackson, Senior Judge of the United States District Court for the District of Columbia
- Raymond J. Lynch, Administrative Law Judge for the Federal Trade Commission
- Gerald McLaughlin, Senior Judge of the United States Court of Appeals for the Third Circuit
- Stephen Reinhardt, Judge of the United States Court of Appeals for the Ninth Circuit
- Barefoot Sanders, Senior Judge of the United States District Court for the Northern District of Texas
- Robert Nugen Wilkin, Senior Judge of the United States District Court for the Northern District of Ohio
- J. Harvie Wilkinson III, Chief Judge of the United States Court of Appeals for the Fourth Circuit

=== State or province supreme court ===
- Wilbur M. Alter, Colorado Supreme Court
- Thomas G. Andrews, Oklahoma Supreme Court
- Archibald C. Buchanan, Supreme Court of Appeals of Virginia
- Charles C. Butler, Chief justice of the Colorado Supreme Court
- Archie Campbell, Justice of the Superior Court of Ontario
- Dwight Campbell, justice of the South Dakota Supreme Court
- Walter H. Cleary, Chief Justice of the Vermont Supreme Court
- Charles S. Colden, justice of the New York Supreme Court
- Frederic R. Colie, justice of the New Jersey Supreme Court
- Charles H. Davis, Illinois Supreme Court Chief Justice
- Jules Deschênes, Chief Justice of the Quebec Superior Court
- John W. Eggleston, chief justice of the Supreme Court of Virginia and Virginia Senate
- James G. Exum, Chief Justice of the North Carolina Supreme Court and North Carolina House of Representatives
- Alan B. Gold, chief justice of the Quebec Superior Court
- Stephen H. Grimes, chief justice of the Florida Supreme Court
- Albert C. Hunt, justice of the Oklahoma Supreme Court
- Lee A. Johnson, Kansas Supreme Court Justice
- Paul Laek, Justice of the Ontario Superior Court of Justice and professor at Osgoode Hall Law School
- Roy McMurtry, Chief Justice of Ontario, Canadian High Commissioner to the United Kingdom, Legislative Assembly of Ontario, Attorney General of Ontario and Solicitor General of Ontario
- Ostis Otto Moore, chief justice of the Colorado Supreme Court
- Frank Richman, justice of the Indiana Supreme Court
- Harold Sebring, Justice of the Florida Supreme Court
- Myra C. Selby, Associate Justice of the Indiana Supreme Court
- John W. Shenk, Associate Justice of the California Supreme Court
- Felix L. Sparks, Associate Justice of the Colorado Supreme Court and brigadier general in the Colorado Army National Guard
- Claude V. Spratley, justice on the Supreme Court of Virginia
- Abram Penn Staples, justice on the Supreme Court of Virginia
- Kennon C. Whittle, Virginia Supreme Court of Appeals

=== Other courts ===
- William Gordon Mathews, referee in bankruptcy and Clerk of the court for Kanawha, West Virginia
- Frank D. Parent, Los Angeles County municipal court judge
- Frederick L. Taft, judge on the Ohio Courts of Common Pleas

== Law ==
- Douglas Arant, special assistant to the United States Attorney General, chairman of the National Committee for Independent Courts, and president of the Alabama State Bar
- Raymond Boucher, trial attorney
- J. Reuben Clark, First Counselor in the First Presidency (LDS Church)
- Donald R. Colvin, attorney
- Jack Faust, lawyer with Schwabe, Williamson & Wyatt
- Eppa Hunton IV, corporate attorney with Hunton Andrews Kurth
- Leon Jaworski, Special Prosecutor for the United States Department of Justice
- John Milton Killits, Senior Judge of the United States District Court for the Northern District of Ohio
- Ray Klingbiel, Chief Justice of the Illinois Supreme Court
- William H. Lamar, Assistant Attorney-General and Solicitor for the Post-Office Department
- Richard W. Lozier Jr., lawyer
- Shain Neumeier, autistic and nonbinary transgender attorney

== Literature and publishing ==
- William Raimond Baird, publisher and namesake of Baird's Manual of American College Fraternities
- Gardner Fox, writer for DC Comics
- Arthur Inkersley, journalist and writer for Scientific American

== Military ==
- Reginald C. Harmon, Major General in the United States Air Force and served as its first Judge Advocate General, mayor of Urbana, Illinois
- William Hayward, commander of the Harlem Hellfighters during World War I, United States Attorney for the Southern District of New York, chairman of the Nebraska Republican State Committee, and secretary of the Republican National Committee
- Felix L. Sparks, Associate Justice of the Colorado Supreme Court and brigadier general in the Colorado Army National Guard
- Oliver Lyman Spaulding, brigadier general in the United States Army

== Politics ==
=== Presidents and prime ministers ===
- Gerald Ford, President of the United States
- Roman Herzog, President of Germany
- William McKinley, President of the United States
- Franklin D. Roosevelt, President of the United States
- Theodore Roosevelt, President of the United States
- William Howard Taft, President of the United States
- John Turner, Prime Minister of Canada

=== Vice presidents ===
- Walter Mondale, Vice President of the United States
- Dan Quayle, Vice President of the United States

=== Governor ===
- Lawton Chiles, Governor of Florida and United States Senator, Florida Senate, and Florida House of Representatives
- Spessard Holland, Governor of Florida and United States Senator
- Charles Evans Hughes, United States Secretary of State, Governor of New York, and chief justice of the United States
- Adlai Stevenson II, Governor of Illinois and United States Ambassador to the United Nations
- Earl Warren, Governor of California and Chief Justice of the United States
- William F. Winter, governor of Mississippi, lieutenant governor of Mississippi, Mississippi State Treasurer, and Mississippi House of Representatives.

=== Lieutenant governor ===
- John Black Aird, Lieutenant Governor of Ontario and Senate of Canada
- Lincoln Alexander, Lieutenant Governor of Ontario, Canadian Minister of Labour, and Member of Parliament

=== Cabinet ===
- James A. Baker III, White House Chief of Staff, United States Secretary of State, and United States Secretary of the Treasury
- Owen Cleary, Michigan Secretary of State and chair of the Michigan Republican Party
- Charles Evans Hughes, United States Secretary of State, Governor of New York, and chief justice of the United States
- Samuel Pierce, United States Secretary of Housing and Urban Development

=== National legislatures ===
- Howard Baker, United States Senate, United States Ambassador to Japan, and White House Chief of Staff
- Birch Bayh, United States Senator and Indiana House of Representatives
- Robert B. Chiperfield, United States House of Representatives
- Bennett Champ Clark, United States Senator and Judge of the United States Court of Appeals for the District of Columbia Circuit
- Robert Crosser, United States House of Representatives and Ohio House of Representatives
- Forrest C. Donnell, United States House of Representatives and Ohio House of Representatives
- Bertrand W. Gearhart, United States House of Representatives
- Daniel Inouye, United States Senate and United States House of Representatives
- Henry M. Jackson, United States Senate and United States House of Representatives
- Stefan Kaufmann, member of the German Bundestag
- Robert F. Kennedy, United States Senator and United States Attorney General
- Patrick Leahy, United States Senate
- Grant E. Mouser Jr., United States of House of Representative
- Bob Rae Canadian Ambassador to the United Nations and Member of Parliament (Canada)
- Sam Rayburn, Speaker of the United States House of Representatives
- Nils Schmid, member of the Bundestag and Deputy Minister President of Baden-Württemberg
- Frederick Steiwer, United States Senate
- Jennifer Wexton, United States House of Representatives and Virginia Senate

=== State and provincial legislatures ===
- E. Almer Ames Jr., Virginia Senate
- David Martin Baker, West Virginia House of Delegates and judge on the West Virginia Court of Claims
- Larry S. Bankston, Louisiana State Senator
- Thomas H. Barland, Wisconsin State Assembly and Wisconsin Circuit Court judge
- Bill Birchfield, Florida House of Representatives
- Thad H. Brown, Ohio Secretary of State
- Jim Burn, chair of the Pennsylvania Democratic Party
- Charles O. Burney Jr., New York State Senate and New York State Assembly
- Annamarie Castrilli, Ontario Member of Provincial Parliament
- Jasper W. Cornaire, New York State Assembly
- Ralph Haben, Speaker of the Florida House of Representatives
- James Hare, Alabama House of Representatives and judge of the Alabama Fourth Judicial Circuit
- William Hoag, Massachusetts House of Representatives and college football coach
- Ben F. Johnson, Georgia State Senate, dean of the Emory University School of Law, and dean of the Georgia State University College of Law
- Edwin B. Jones, Virginia House of Delegates and Virginia State Treasurer
- George H. Kreeger, Georgia House of Representatives and Chief Judge of the Superior Court of Cobb County, Georgia
- Frederick Lippitt, Rhode Island House of Representatives
- Morris Lottinger Jr., Louisiana House of Representatives
- Roy McMurtry, Chief Justice of Ontario, Canadian High Commissioner to the United Kingdom, Legislative Assembly of Ontario, Attorney General of Ontario and Solicitor General of Ontario
- Harold C. Mitchell, New York State Assembly
- John Hill Morgan, New York State Assembly
- Doug Overbey, Tennessee House of Representatives and United States Attorney for the Eastern District of Tennessee
- Edward R. Rayher, New York State Assembly
- Arthur J. Ruland, New York State Assembly
- Walter B. Russell Jr., Georgia House of Representatives
- Frank P. Simoneaux, Louisiana House of Representatives
- Francis R. Stoddard Jr., New York State Assembly
- Scott Swisher, Iowa House of Representatives
- Frank R. Uible, Ohio House of Representatives
- Edmund W. Wakelee, New Jersey General Assembly
- Lloyd F. Wheat, Louisiana State Senate
- Joshua Soule Zimmerman, West Virginia House of Delegates

=== Other ===
- Albert I. Beach, Mayor of Kansas City
- Ben H. Brown Jr., United States Ambassador to Liberia
- Larry Carp, the Democratic nominee for Congress from the 2nd congressional district in 1960
- José Gomez Gordoa, Mexican ambassador to Spain and rector of the Escuela Libre de Derecho
- Edgar Hager, Mayor of Ashland, Kentucky
- Eugene M. Locke, United States ambassador to Pakistan and United States deputy ambassador to South Vietnam
- Thomas B. Lockwood, lawyer and unsuccessful candidate for the Lieutenant Governor of New York
- Manuel Miranda, diplomat at the Embassy of the United States, Baghdad
- Watkins Overton, Mayor of Memphis
- Mike Pieciak, Vermont State Treasurer
- Frederick C. Tanner, chairman of the New York Republican State Committee
- George R. Van Namee, Clerk of the New York State Assembly and campaign manager Franklin D. Roosevelt's gubernatorial campaign
- Wendell Willkie, lawyer, corporate executive and the 1940 Republican nominee for president.
- Charles Stetson Wheeler, member of the Committee of Fifty after the 1906 San Francisco earthquake

== Solicitor General ==
- Robert Bork, Solicitor General of the United States and judge of the United States Court of Appeals for the District of Columbia Circuit
- Archibald Cox, Solicitor General of the United States
- Roy McMurtry, Chief Justice of Ontario, Canadian High Commissioner to the United Kingdom, Legislative Assembly of Ontario, Attorney General of Ontario and Solicitor General of Ontario
- Kenneth Starr, Solicitor General of the United States and Independent Counsel for the Whitewater Controversy

== Sports ==
- Bert Baston, professional football player with the Cleveland Tigers
- Warren Grimm, All-American football player
- Bobby Jones, amateur golfer founder of the Augusta National Golf Club, and co-founder of the Masters Tournament
- Oscar Lambert, collegiate football, basketball, and baseball player
- John McGovern, member of the College Football Hall of Fame
- Eddie Rogers, college football player and coach
- Theodore M. Stuart, college football player and coach
- Dudley Sutphin, professional tennis player
- Leigh C. Turner, college football player and coach
- Byron White, professional football player who served as an associate justice of the Supreme Court of the United States
