= 1876 West Virginia gubernatorial election =

- October 10, 1876
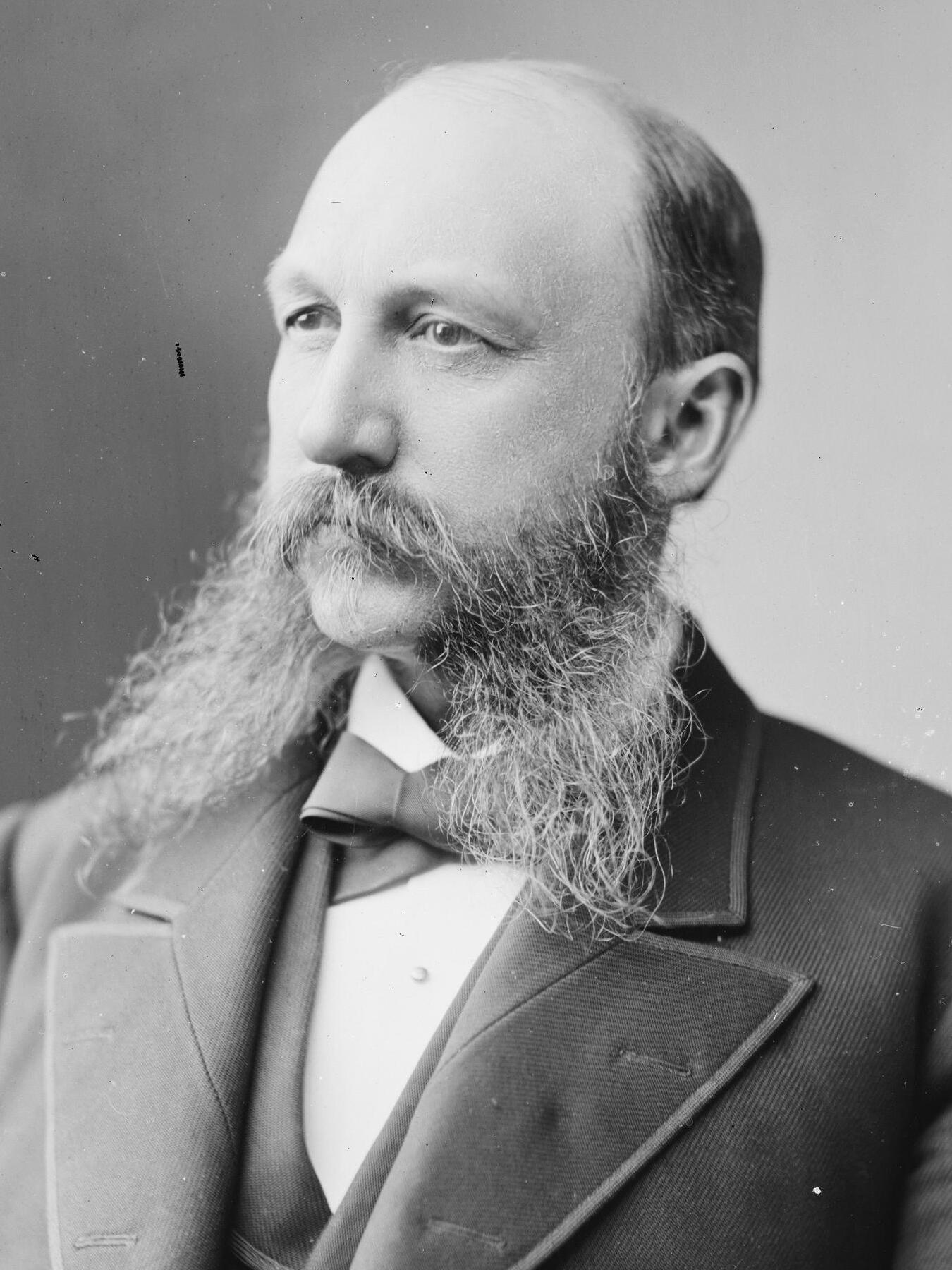

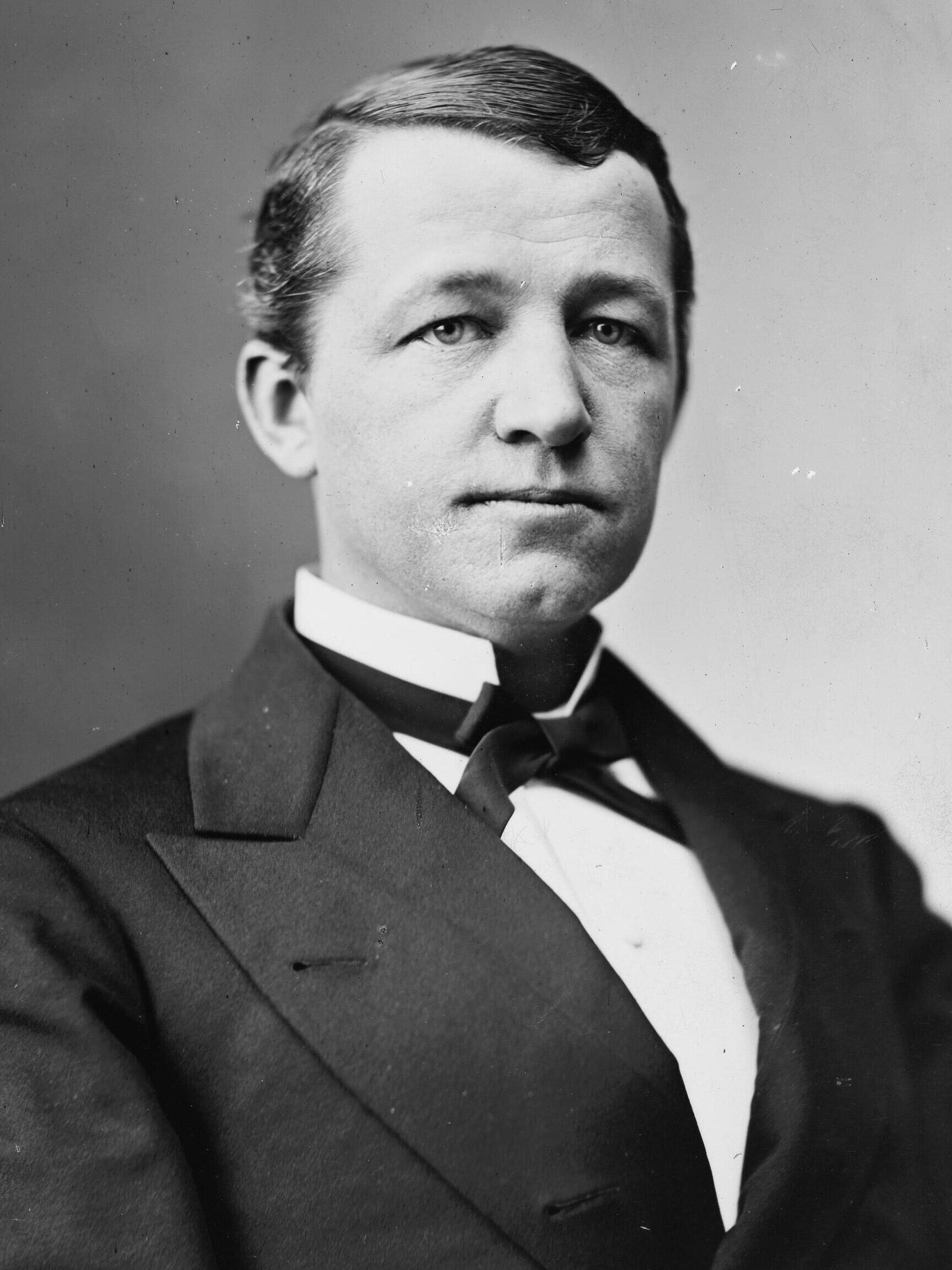
Nominee	Henry M. Mathews	Nathan Goff Jr.
Party	Democratic	Republican
Popular vote	56,206	43,477
Percentage	56.20%	43.47%
- County results Mathews: 50–60% 60–70% 70–80% 80–90% 90–100% Goff: 50–60% 60–70%
Governor before election
John J. Jacob
People's Independent
Elected Governor
Henry M. Mathews
Democratic

The 1876 West Virginia gubernatorial election took place on October 10, 1876, to elect the governor of West Virginia.

== Results ==
West Virginia gubernatorial election, 1876
Party	Candidate	Votes	%
Democratic	Henry M. Mathews	56,206	56.20
Republican	Nathan Goff Jr.	43,477	43.47
Greenback	J. M. Laidley	332	0.33
Total votes		100,015	100
Democratic gain from People's Independent Party (Jacob)			
