= Union Trust Building =

Union Trust Building or Union Trust Company Building may refer to:

- Continental Building, formerly Union Trust Building, Los Angeles, California
- Union and New Haven Trust Building, New Haven, Connecticut
- Union Trust Company Building (Springfield, Massachusetts)
- Guardian Building, Detroit, Michigan
- Union Trust Company Building (St. Louis, Missouri)
- Union Trust Building (Cincinnati, Ohio)
- Huntington Bank Building, Cleveland, Ohio
- Union Trust Building (New York City)
- Union Trust Building (Pittsburgh, Pennsylvania)
- Union Trust Company Building (Providence, Rhode Island)
- Union Trust Building (Seattle), Washington
- Union Trust Building (Washington, D.C.)
- Union Trust & Deposit Co./Union Trust National Bank, Parkersburg, West Virginia
