= 1870 West Virginia gubernatorial election =

- October 27, 1870
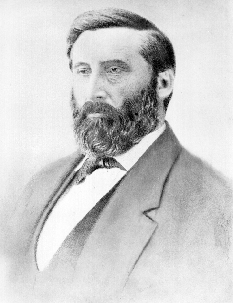

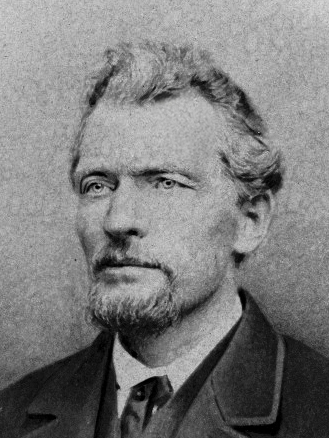
Nominee	John J. Jacob	William E. Stevenson
Party	Democratic	Republican
Popular vote	29,097	26,924
Percentage	51.94%	48.06%
- County results Jacob: 50–60% 60–70% 70–80% 80–90% Stevenson: 50–60% 60–70% 70–80%
Governor before election
William E. Stevenson
Republican
Elected Governor
John J. Jacob
Democratic

The 1870 West Virginia gubernatorial election took place on October 27, 1870, to elect the governor of West Virginia.

This was the last election of a governor to a 2-year term. Starting in 1872, West Virginia would elect its governor to a 4-year term.

== Results ==
West Virginia gubernatorial election, 1870
Party	Candidate	Votes	%
Democratic	John J. Jacob	29,097	51.94
Republican	William E. Stevenson	26,924	48.06
Total votes		59,021	100
Democratic gain from Republican			
