= William Gordon Mathews =

West Virginian judge and lawyer (1877 – 1923)

William G. Mathews
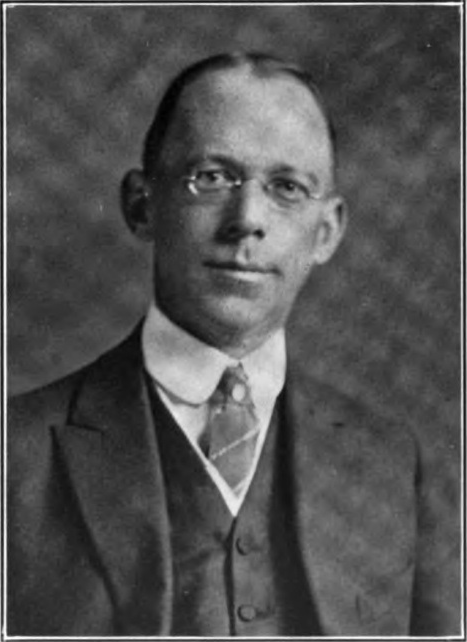

Referee in bankruptcy for Kanawha, West Virginia
- In office 1898–1908

Clerk of the court for Kanawha, West Virginia
- In office 1903–1904

Personal details
- Born: February 26, 1877 Lewisburg, West Virginia
- Died: June 15, 1923 (aged 46) Charleston, West Virginia
- Party: Democratic
- Relations: Mathews family
- Education: Georgetown Law School, University of Virginia School of Law
- Profession: federal judge, lawyer

William Gordon Mathews (February 26, 1877 – June 15, 1923) was a federal judge and lawyer from Charleston, West Virginia, serving as Referee in Bankruptcy for Kanawha, West Virginia 1898–1908, and Clerk of the Court for Kanawha 1903–1904.

== Life ==
William Gordon Mathews was born on February 26, 1877, in Lewisburg, West Virginia, to Lucy Fry and Henry Mason Mathews. His family was politically prominent in the Virginias. His father was governor of West Virginia, and his maternal grandfather, Joseph L. Fry, was a West Virginia judge.

Mathews was educated at the Lewisburg Military Academy. In 1895 he enrolled in Georgetown Law School for one year, afterward completing his degree at the University of Virginia School of Law, graduating in 1897 at 20 years of age. He was a member of the fraternities Phi Delta Phi and Phi Delta Theta. In 1897 he moved to Charleston, Kanawha County, and was admitted to the Bar. He married Helen B. Davis in 1903.

Mathews entered a law partnership with Wesley Mallohan and George McClintic and was appointed referee in bankruptcy for Kanawha, West Virginia, in 1898 by John B. Jackson, in the first year the federal office was created by the United States Congress. In 1903 he served as the clerk of court for Kanawha County on the death of Judge F. A. Guthrie.

In 1908 he was selected as the Democratic Party's nominee for the West Virginia Supreme Court, but was defeated with the Democratic ticket. He served as an alternate delegate to the Democratic National Convention of 1904. In 1913 he became president of the West Virginia Bar Association.

When the United States entered World War I, Mathews was appointed by President Woodrow Wilson as the legal member of the District Board of the Southern District of West Virginia under the Selective Service Act of May 18, 1917, and served in that capacity until the end of the war. He died in 1923.

== Published works ==
- Martial Law in West Virginia, 1913
