= Henry M. Mathews =

American military officer, lawyer, and politician

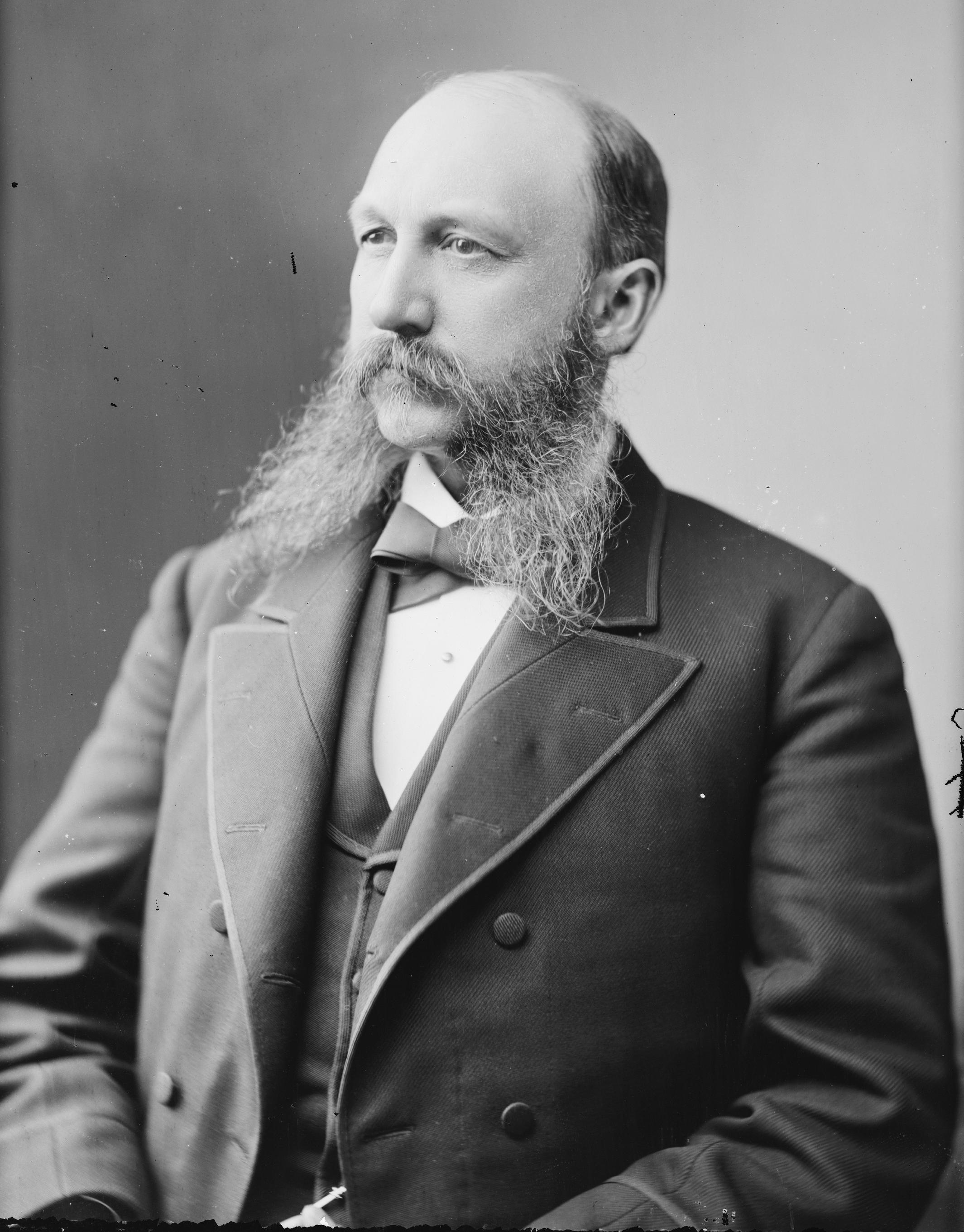

5th Governor of West Virginia
- In office March 4, 1877 – March 4, 1881
- Preceded by: John J. Jacob
- Succeeded by: Jacob B. Jackson

7th Attorney General of West Virginia
- In office 1873–1877
- Governor: John J. Jacob
- Preceded by: Joseph Sprigg
- Succeeded by: Robert White

Personal details
- Born: March 29, 1834 Frankford, Virginia (now West Virginia), US
- Died: April 28, 1884 (aged 50) Lewisburg, West Virginia, US
- Party: Democratic
- Spouse: Lucy Fry Mathews
- Parents: Mason Mathews; Eliza Shore Reynolds Mathews
- Relatives: Alexander W. Reynolds (uncle); Alexander F. Mathews; Joseph William Mathews
- Education: University of Virginia; A.B. 1856; Washington and Lee School of Law B.L. 1857
- Profession: Politician

Military service
- Allegiance: {Confederate States of America
- Branch/service: Confederate States Army
- Years of service: 1861–1864
- Rank: Major of Artillery 1863–1864

Henry Mason Mathews (March 29, 1834 – April 28, 1884) was an American military officer, lawyer, and politician in the U.S. State of West Virginia who served as the seventh attorney general of West Virginia (1873–1877) and the fifth governor of West Virginia (1877–1881).

In early life, Mathews attended the University of Virginia and served in the Confederate States Army as a major of artillery. Following the war, Mathews was elected to the West Virginia Senate, but was denied the seat due to state restrictions on former Confederates. He participated in the 1872 state constitutional convention that overturned these restrictions, and in that same year was elected attorney general of the state. After one term, he was elected governor of West Virginia.

As West Virginia governor, Mathews' administration faced challenges related to the Long Depression, including the violent outbreak of the Great Railroad Strike of 1877 in Martinsburg, West Virginia. After several failed attempts to contain the crisis with state militia, Mathews requested federal troops from President Rutherford B. Hayes. His response to the strike has been viewed as a catalyst for the transformation of the state militia system into the National Guard (United States).

== Early life ==
Henry Mason Mathews was born on March 29, 1834, in Frankford, Virginia, U.S., (located in modern-day West Virginia) to Eliza Shore (née Reynolds) and Mason Mathews. His family had been politically prominent in western Virginia for several generations, and his father was a merchant and politician who served in the Virginia House of Delegates. His ancestry was Scotch-Irish and/or Welsh.

Mathews received early education at the local Lewisburg Academy, and afterward attended the University of Virginia, earning a Bachelor of Arts in 1855 and a Master of Arts in 1856. He was a member of the Beta Theta Pi fraternity. In his Masters Thesis, "Poetry in America," Mathews advocated the study of fine arts and reconciled their apparent decline in the face of industrialism with the potential for societal advancement such industry implied. On the completion of his graduate degree, Mathews entered Lexington Law School and studied under John W. Brockenbrough, graduating in 1857 with a degree of Bachelor of Laws. He was admitted to the bar and began practicing in the fall of that year. Soon afterward he accepted the professorship of Language and Literature at Alleghany College, Blue Sulphur Springs, retaining the privilege to practicing law in the courts. In November 1857, at age 22, Mathews married Lucy Fry Mathews, daughter of Judge Joseph L. Fry. They would go on to have 5 children: Lucile "Josephine", Mason, William Gordon, Henry Edgar, and Laura Herne.

Mathews became active in local politics in the years proceeding the outbreak of the American Civil War, organizing for Democratic presidential candidate John C. Breckinridge during the 1860 presidential campaign. Breckinridge lost the national vote to Abraham Lincoln, who did not receive a single vote in Mathews' home county of Greenbrier. Nevertheless, Greenbrier was generally opposed to secession in the United States and voted against it in the Virginia Secession Convention of 1861.

== Military service ==
There is but one sentiment here. Every man, young & old is ready at a minute's warning to defend the Old Commonwealth.

— H. M. Mathews letter to Virginia governor John Letcher, April 21, 1861

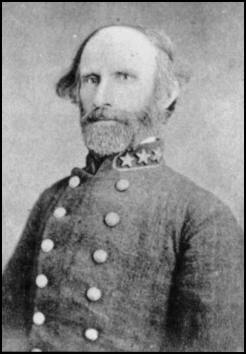
Brigadier General Alexander W. Reynolds, uncle of Major Henry Mason Mathews

Mathews chose to follow his home state of Virginia on its joining of the Confederate States of America. Along with his two brothers, he volunteered for the Confederate States Army (CSA) in 1861 at the rank of private. Early in the war he was assigned to recruiting and enlisting duties Virginia. In 1863, he was moved to the staff of his uncle, Brigadier General Alexander W. Reynolds, in Major General Carter L. Stevenson's division of Lieutenant General John C. Pemberton's army. He was promoted to major of artillery and served the Vicksburg Campaign. When general Stevenson's division advanced to Baker's Creek for the Battle of Champion Hill, Mathews was left in Vicksburg as the chief of his department.

Throughout the war, Mathews frequently ran into difficulties with the Confederate military. He contemplated leaving the army in 1863, and also in that year applied for a transfer from his uncle's brigade to Richmond, Virginia, though the results of this request are unclear. In the fall of 1864, he was arrested by orders of General Robert E. Lee due to a misunderstanding of a courier's message regarding ordnance movement. Lee dismissed the charges on receipt of Mathews' explanation. By the end of 1864, Mathews had finally lost all enthusiasm for the war and was relieved from active duty at his request.

== Political career ==
=== Political rise ===
While at war Mathews' reputation as a leader had spread at home. In a post-war state dominated by the Republican party, Mathews, a Democrat, was elected to the West Virginia Senate in 1865 but was denied the seat due to the restriction that prohibited former Confederates from holding public office. As in-state Democratic support increased in subsequent years, Republicans amended the West Virginia State Constitution to return state rights to former Confederates in an attempt to appeal to voters. The effort backfired as this enabled the Democratic party to regained control of the legislature. Mathews was sent as a Democratic delegate to the Constitutional Convention of 1872 to overhaul the 1863 Republican-drafted state constitution. The drafting of this new constitution enabled Mathews' rise in the politics of the state. The following year, 1873, he was elected attorney general of the state under Governor John J. Jacobs, succeeding Joseph Sprigg, and served one term in which his popularity within his party rose.

On Mathews' political acumen, William A. MacCorkle said of him, "He was not a good come-and-take debater, but when he had prepared himself to make an oration on the issues of the day, he was splendid. His oratory was easy, smooth, perfectly balanced, his voice was splendidly modulated, his gestures were perfect, and he could make as fine an impression on a rather cultivated audience as any man in the state."

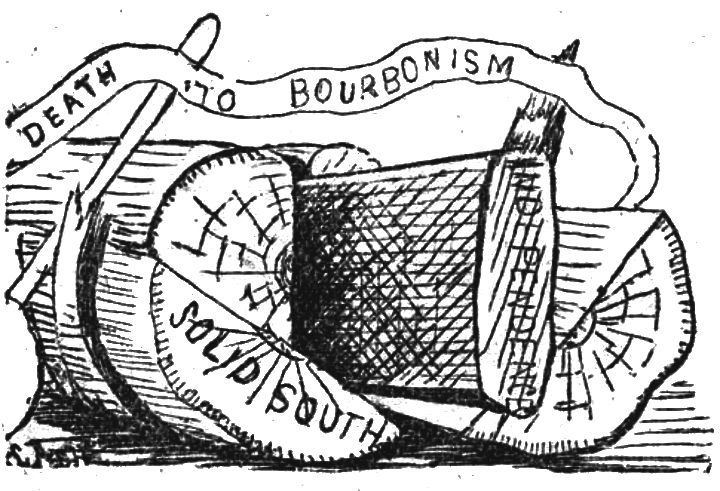
An 1870s political cartoon calling for "Death to Bourbonism"

At the conclusion of his term as attorney general, Mathews defeated Republican Nathan Goff by 15,000 votes in the most one-sided race for governor in state history at that time. Thus, on March 4, 1877, Mathews became fifth governor of West Virginia, and the first Confederate veteran to be elected to the state governorship. Mathews' conservative, pro-business platform aligned with the Bourbon Democratic movement sweeping the South. Mathews was the first of the Bourbons to ascend to a governorship, though many would follow all over the South in the 1880s.

=== Governor of West Virginia ===
In his inaugural address, Mathews emphasized unity and progress in the wake of war, promising:

The legitimate results of the war have been accepted in good faith, and political parties are no longer aligned upon the dead issues of the past. We have ceased to look back mournfully, and have said "Let the dead past bury its dead," and with reorganized forces have moved up to the living issues of the present.

Mathews' address was well-received across the state. His inaugural celebration, which included "flowers and flags and banners and music, feasting and revelry," had been a more elaborate than previous gubernatorial inaugurations in the state, setting a precedent that has continued to the present.

On assembling his cabinet, Mathews sought to reduce post-war political tension. He appointed both Republican and Democratic party members to his cabinet, a move that was uncommon in the post-war political climate.

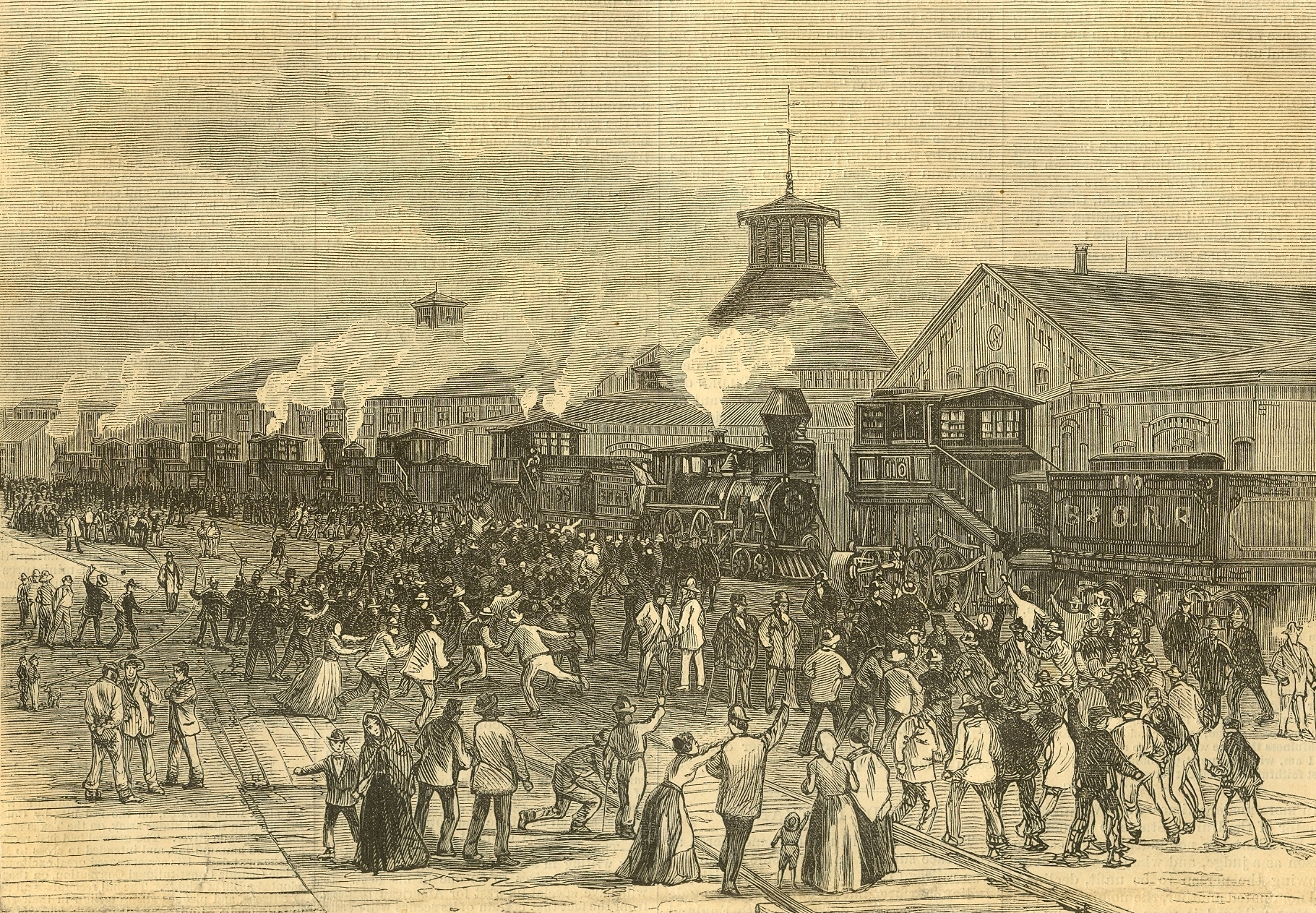
Blockade of engines at Martinsburg, West Virginia, July 16, 1877

==== Great Railroad Strike ====
Awaiting Mathews in office were economic woes associated with the Panic of 1873 and the subsequent Long Depression. In July 1877, four months into his term, he was notified that Baltimore and Ohio Railroad (B&O) workers in Martinsburg, West Virginia, had been stopping trains to protest wage cuts. Mathews called out local militia under Colonel Charles J. Faulkner to disperse the protest, but unbeknownst to Mathews, several in the company were rail workers themselves, and many others were sympathetic to the strike. The militia acted indecisively on arrival, and in the confusion a striker named William Vandergriff fired on the militia and was mortally wounded by return fire. Local papers blamed Mathews for the death and deemed Vandergriff a "martyr." The militia officially informed Mathews that they would thereon refuse his orders.

Mathews responded by sending another militia company—this time with no rail workers were among them—to address the growing strike, but he was soon informed that this company too would not act against the strikers. Mathews finally complied with the urging of his administration to request federal troops from President Rutherford B. Hayes. Mathews' decision to call for federal support garnered significant national notice to the strikes. Local newspapers were highly critical of the governor's characterization of the strikes to Hayes as an "insurrection" rather than an act of desperation, with one notable paper recorded a striking worker's perspective that, "[he] had might as well die by the bullet as to starve to death by inches." His decision to call for federal assistance has been vindicated by historians, who have come to view federal involvement as inevitable.

Hayes had vowed not to involve the Federal government in domestic matters during his candidacy several months prior, and he sought to solve the matter diplomatically, but after failed negotiations with leaders of the railway "insurrection," he reluctantly dispatched Federal troops to Martinsburg. However, by this time the strike, by then referred to as the Great Railroad Strike of 1877, had reverted to peaceful protest in Martinsburg while violence spread to Maryland, Pennsylvania, Illinois, and Missouri. The strike gained support in other states across the country.

In 1880, Mathews was again required to dispatch the militia, this time to Hawks Nest, West Virginia, to stop the state's first major coal strike, as miners from Hawks Nest were being threatened with violence to cease productivity by a rival constituent.

==== Relocating the capitol ====
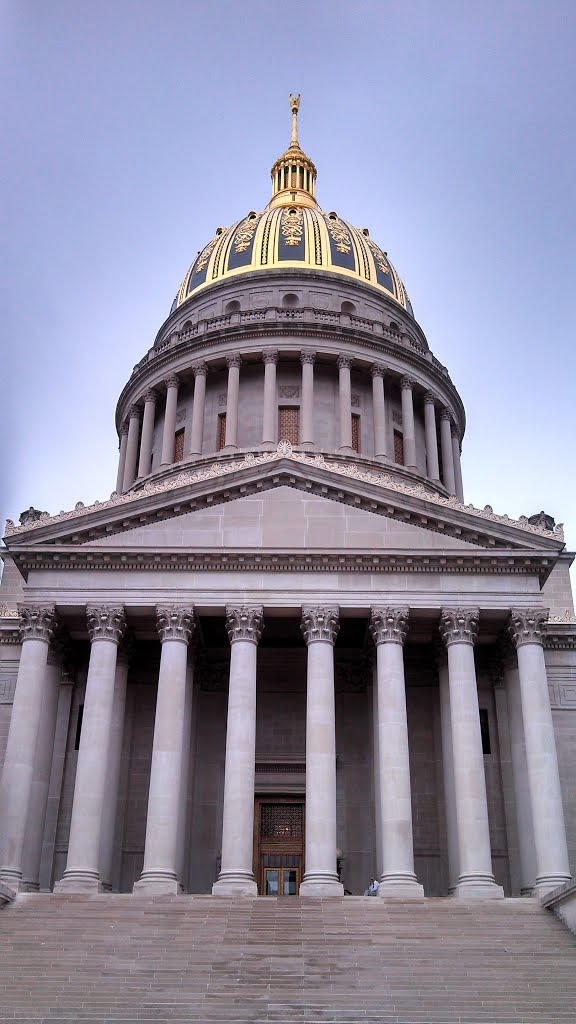
West Virginia State Capitol in Charleston, West Virginia. Charleston was made the state's permanent state capital during Mathews' administration.

From 1863, when West Virginia was formed, through 1875, the capital of West Virginia had alternated between Wheeling and Charleston, with its location largely dependent on political party control of the state, with Republicans favoring Wheeling and Democrats favoring Charleston. Early in Mathews' administration, a vote was held to determine a permanent location for the capital, which was currently located in Wheeling. Three options of Charleston, Clarksburg, and Martinsburg were presented (Wheeling was not listed as a voting option). During the campaigning, state Democrats employed a young Booker T. Washington to engage in a speaking tour to consolidate Black opinion in favor of Charleston. Charleston won the vote, and has remained the state capital since.

==== State debt and treasury ====
Questions of debt owed by West Virginia to Virginia persisted throughout Mathews' term in office. The question arose quickly when in 1863 West Virginia was created from the northwestern Virginia region. While both states recognized that a debt existed, determining the value of the debt proved difficult. Virginia authorities had determined that West Virginia should assume approximately one-third of the state debt as of January 1, 1861 — the year Virginia was seceded from the United States, determining West Virginia's total to be $953,360.32. Mathews' advisers countered with the figure of $525,000. Another figure given to him by the Virginians was $7,000,000, owed by West Virginia to its eastern counterpart. Unable to determine the accuracy of these reports, and recognizing that the question had taken on political meaning, Mathews pursued policy intended to suspend a resolution until the specifics had become clear. His successor, Jacob B. Jackson, inherited the same problem and further suspended the resolution of the matter. The argument dragged on throughout the 1800s and the debt was not retired until 1939.

During Mathews' administration, Attorney General Robert White secured a decision by the United States Supreme Court in favor of levying taxes against the burgeoning railroad industry, which to that point had not paid any taxes to the State of West Virginia. This decision resulted in an influx of thousands of dollars into the State treasury.

==== Race issues ====
Before the Civil War, western Virginia had a relatively low slave population compared to the eastern part of the state, or the South as a whole (4% in western Virginia as compared to about 30% in the South). Mathews was raised in one such slaveholding western Virginia household. Mathews' precise views on race and slavery are unclear, though he was a member of several local political conventions that issued statements and resolutions opposing racial equality, both before and after the Civil War. He was also a delegate to the state convention that drafted the 1872 West Virginia Constitution which codified policies of segregation in the state. During Mathews' political career he was identified as a Redeemer – the Southern faction of the Bourbon Democrats. Redeemers dominated Southern politics in most areas from the 1870s to 1910 and were generally led by wealthy former planters, businessmen, and professionals who sought to expel the freedmen, carpetbaggers, and scalawags from Southern government and reestablished white supremacy in the South. However, West Virginia historian Otis K. Rice objects to this characterization of the West Virginia Redeemers:

This fails to do justice to the flexibility of West Virginia Bourbons. The West Virginia Democrats who followed the Republican founders of the state included Governors Mathews, Jackson, Wilson, Fleming, and MacCorkle. These men were ready to adjust to changing political conditions and to the 13th, 14th, and 15th amendments to the federal Constitution, which conferred freedom, citizenship, and the right to vote and hold office upon former slaves.

From 1865 to 1957, West Virginia passed eleven Jim Crow laws under Democratic leadership. None of these were passed during Mathews' administration. In 1881, following the ruling of the Strauder v. West Virginia Supreme Court case, Mathews reversed a 1873 state law that prohibited Black citizens from serving on juries. In his closing address to the West Virginia legislature in January 1881, Mathews urged his fellow statesmen to adopt a progressive attitude towards the divisive issues that precipitated the Civil War:

It is necessary . . . to fully realize that institutions under which some of us were reared and which have left an enduring impress on our character, -- which have influenced not only our habits of living, but also our opinions and habits of thought -- are now of the past and no longer factors of existing social or political problems; that while the fundamental principles of our republican institutions are forever true and sufficient for all time, yet they must be adapted to the changed conditions produced by the result of the civil war, an increasing population and an advancing civilization. West Virginia should be aligned with the most progressive of her sister States, between whose institutions and her own there is no longer any conflict . . .

Fast notes that the "liberal-minded" spirit of Mathews' administration received a setback during the campaign of his predecessor, Jacob B. Jackson, under whom "[t]he old sores of war were torn upon and bled afresh."

== Later life ==
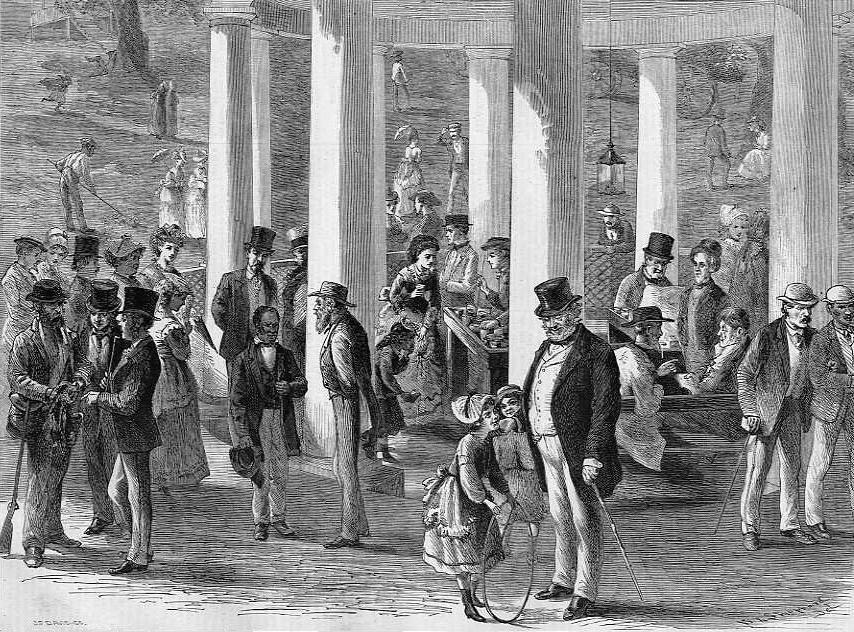
Late 19th-century White Sulfur Springs Company

After his gubernatorial term, Mathews returned to his law practice. He also served as president of the White Sulfur Springs Company (now The Greenbrier resort) following its post-war reopening. The resort became a place for many Southerners and Northerners alike to vacation, and the setting for many famous post-war reconciliations, including the White Sulphur Manifesto, which was the only political position issued by Robert E. Lee after the Civil War, that advocated the merging of the two societies. The resort went on to become a center of regional post-war society.

Henry M. Mathews died unexpectedly on April 28, 1884, and is buried in the Old Stone Church cemetery in Lewisburg, West Virginia.

== Legacy ==
As West Virginia governor Mathews established a state immigration bureau to attract new workers to the state, expanded the coal and oil industries, improved transportation, and funded a state geological survey. His administration at large has been characterized as "an era of good feeling," due to his appointing of Republicans to office during his Democratic tenure.

Historian Mary L. Rickard, in the Calendar of the Henry Mason Mathews Letters and Papers in the State Department of Archives and History (1941), offered a critical analysis of his administration: "At this time there was less wealth per capita in West Virginia than in 1865, the result of which had a pronounced effect upon State politics. Those highest up in the social scale held the highest political positions and the entire organization became dangerously corrupt." However, West Virginia historian Richard Fast notes that no committee to investigate any alleged scandal or mismanagement was appointed during Mathews' term.

=== National guard ===
The Great Railroad Strike of 1877 erupted into violence in Martinsburg, West Virginia, and spread spontaneously throughout the Northeast and Midwest. Mathews was the first state commander in chief to deploy troops in response to the strikes. He initially sent two state militia units, and when it became clear that these units were unable to contain the crisis, he requested federal troops from President Rutherford B. Hayes. National Guard historian Michael Doubler notes that the failures of the state militias to manage the strikes was "a watershed event" in state militia reform, with West Virginia being a particularly significant example. Mathews' response in Martinsburg exposed serious deficiencies in the state militia system that helped set in motion the transformation of state militias into the National Guard (United States).

== Bibliography ==
- Addkison-Simmons, Donna (2010). Henry Mason Mathews. e-WV: The West Virginia Encyclopedia.
- Boots, John R. (1970). The Mat(t)hews family: an anthology of Mathews lineages. Florida: Ocala, Florida. OCLC 133692.
- Callahan, James (1923). The History of West Virginia, Old and New, Volume II, pgs. 7–9. Chicago and New York: The American Historical Society, Inc. OCLC 42346040.
- Caplinger, Michael (2003). "The Baltimore and Ohio Railroad Martinsburg Shops National Historic Landmark Nomination" (PDF). pp. 40–45.
- Carmichael, Peter S. (2005). The Last Generation: Young Virginians in Peace, War, and Reunion. The University of North Carolina Press. ISBN 0-8078-2948-X. OCLC 830651417.
- Combs, James Thurl (1987). Greenbrier, C.S.A. Wartime Letters of Mason Mathews to his son Captain Joseph William Mathews, C.S.A., p. 5–44. Parsons, West Virginia: The Journal of the Greenbrier Historical Society. OCLC 13983198.
- Curry, Robert (2010) [1964]. A House Divided: A Study of Statehood Politics and the Copperhead Movement in West Virginia. Pennsylvania: University of Pittsburgh Press. p. 50. ISBN 978-0-8229-8389-7. OCLC 884520995.
- Fast, Richard (1901). The History and Government of West Virginia. West Virginia: Acme Publishing Company.
- National Governors Association (2003). "Gov. Henry Mason Mathews". National Governors Association. NGA.
- Rickard, Mary (1941). Calendar of the Henry Mason Mathews Letters and Papers in the State Department of Archives and History. Charleston, West Virginia: West Virginia Historical Records Survey. OCLC 23611963.
- Rice, Otis K. (1986). A History of Greenbrier County. Lewisburg, West Virginia: Greenbrier Historical Society. ISBN 0-9617505-0-2. OCLC 15539717.
- White, James T. (1904). The National Cyclopaedia of American Biography. e-WV: The West Virginia Encyclopedia. OCLC 1007087389.

Party political offices
| Preceded by Johnson N. Camden | Democratic nominee for Governor of West Virginia; 1876 | Succeeded by Jacob B. Jackson |
Legal offices
| Preceded by Joseph Sprigg | Attorney General of West Virginia; 1873–1877 | Succeeded by Robert White |
Political offices
| Preceded by John J. Jacob | Governor of West Virginia; 1877–1881 | Succeeded by Jacob B. Jackson |
