= Raymond Lynch =

Raymond Lynch may refer to:

- Ray Lynch (born 1943), American guitarist and lutenist
- Ray Lynch (American football) (1894–1965), American football player and coach
- Raymond J. Lynch (1909–2007), U.S. judge
- E. Raymond Lynch (1922–2013), member of the Pennsylvania House of Representatives
