= Lucy Fry Mathews =

- Born: 1830; Frankford, West Virginia
- Died: 1904 (aged 73–74); Lewisburg, West Virginia
- Known for: First lady of West Virginia, 1877-1881
- Relatives: Mathews family

Lucy Fry Mathews (1830–1904) was the wife of former Governor of West Virginia Henry M. Mathews and served as that state's First Lady (1877–1881). She was born in 1830, at Frankford, West Virginia. In 1857, she married Henry M. Mathews. After leaving office, the Mathews moved to Lewisburg, West Virginia. She died in 1904.

Honorary titles
Preceded by Jane Baird Jacob	First Lady of West Virginia; 1877 – 1881	Succeeded by Maria Willard Jackson
