= Joseph Snider =

Joseph Snider (February 14, 1827 – January 9, 1909) was a member of the 1861 Wheeling Conventions, which declared West Virginia a new state as part of the Union. He served as a colonel in the 7th West Virginia Infantry during the Civil War. He also served as the commander in the 4th West Virginia Cavalry. He was in the battles of South Mountain, Antietam, Fredericksburg and Chancellorsville. He was wounded three times. He later was a member of the West Virginia legislature in 1872/73 and 1875. Joseph married twice: first to Margaretta Miller (1824/1878) by whom he had four children: Olive, Edith, Elisha and Frank, and second to Laura Miller. He had one child by his second marriage that died as an infant.

In May 1999, the West Virginia State Archives received a donation of nine Civil War-era letters written by Colonel Joseph Snider, commander of the 7th West Virginia Infantry and 4th West Virginia Cavalry, to his daughter Mary Edith. The letters were a gift from Ken and Connie Easley, a great-granddaughter, of Tallahassee, Florida, and had been kept for years by Snider's great-granddaughter, Amelia Lockard Moul.
