= 4th West Virginia Cavalry Regiment =

Cavalry regiment that served in the Union Army during the American Civil War

- West Virginia State Flag
- Active: July 1863 to June 23, 1864
- Country: United States
- Allegiance: Union
- Branch: Cavalry
- Engagements: Action at Moorefield (January 30, 1864)

The 4th West Virginia Cavalry Regiment served in the Union Army during the American Civil War. The regiment was organized in Parkersburg and Wheeling, West Virginia during July and August 1863. Enlistment was for one year, and the regiment was mustered out on June 23, 1864. Most of its duty involved guarding railroads and operating against guerrillas. The regiment lost 30 soldiers during the war from disease.

== Service ==
The 4th West Virginia Cavalry Regiment was enlisted in Parkersburg and Wheeling in western Virginia between July and August 1863 for one year's service.

- January 30, 1864, Engagement at Moorefield (not the August 7 Battle of Moorefield)

The regiment was mustered out on June 23, 1864.

== Casualties ==
The 4th West Virginia Cavalry Regiment suffered 30 enlisted men dead from disease for a total of 30 deaths.

== Officers ==
=== Colonel ===
- Joseph Snider (formerly of the 7th West Virginia Infantry)

=== Lieutenant-Colonel ===
- Samuel W. Snider

=== Majors ===
- Nathan Goff Jr. (formerly of the 6th West Virginia Cavalry). He was captured during the action at Moorefield, when pinned under his fallen horse, and sent to Libby Prison in Richmond, Virginia where he was held in close confinement as a hostage for the captured Confederate Major Thomas D. Armsey. He and Armsey were eventually exchanged and President Abraham Lincoln sent for Goff, who described the conditions in Confederate prison camps, prompting Lincoln to arrange further exchanges.
- Charles F. Howes
- James A. Smith

=== QM Sergeants ===
- Octavius C. Bray Company A 1863-65

=== First Sergeant ===
- Montgomery Hager Company K

== See also ==
- Medals of Honor for West Virginia Soldiers
- West Virginia Units in the Civil War
- West Virginia in the Civil War

== Notes ==
=== References ===
- Dyer, Frederick H. (1908). A Compendium of the War of the Rebellion. Des Moines, Iowa: Dyer Pub. Co. OCLC 1028851810.
- Lang, Joseph J. (1895). Loyal West Virginia from 1861 to 1865 : With an Introductory Chapter on the Status of Virginia for Thirty Years Prior to the War. Baltimore, MD: Deutsch Publishing Co. OCLC 779093.
- Snell, Mark A. (2011). West Virginia and the Civil War : Mountaineers are Always Free. Charleston, SC: History Press. ISBN 978-1-61423-390-9. OCLC 829025932.
- Union Army (1908). The Union Army, Vol. 2: A History of Military Affairs in the Loyal States 1861-65, Records of the Regiments in the Union Army, Cyclopedia of Battles, Memoirs of Commanders and Soldiers; New York, Maryland, West Virginia and Ohio. Madison, Wisconsin: Federal Publishing Company.
