= John Van Lear McMahon =

American lawyer

John Van Lear McMahon was a lawyer who was born in Maryland in about 1800. He was educated at Princeton, studied law and entered the Maryland Bar. On account of his oratorical gifts, he was influential in the politics as a state legislator. He adapted the old turnpike laws of Maryland to the new condition of affairs caused by the incorporation of the Baltimore and Ohio railroad, and was for some years its counsel. He is said to have contributed more than any other to the prosperity of the Jackson party in Maryland, but subsequently deserted it on the United States Bank question. He took a conspicuous part in the canvas of 1840, and presided at a great ratification meeting, where Henry Clay, Daniel Webster, and William C. Preston made speeches. The failure of his eyesight compelled him to relinquish his profession about 1855, and much of his later life was spent in Ohio. St. John's college, Annapolis, gave him the degree of LL. D. in 1869. He published "An Historical View of Maryland", which is a standard authority on the early history of the province (Baltimore, 1831). He died in Cumberland, Md. on June 15, 1871.
