= José Gómez Gordoa =

Mexican lawyer, professor and diplomat

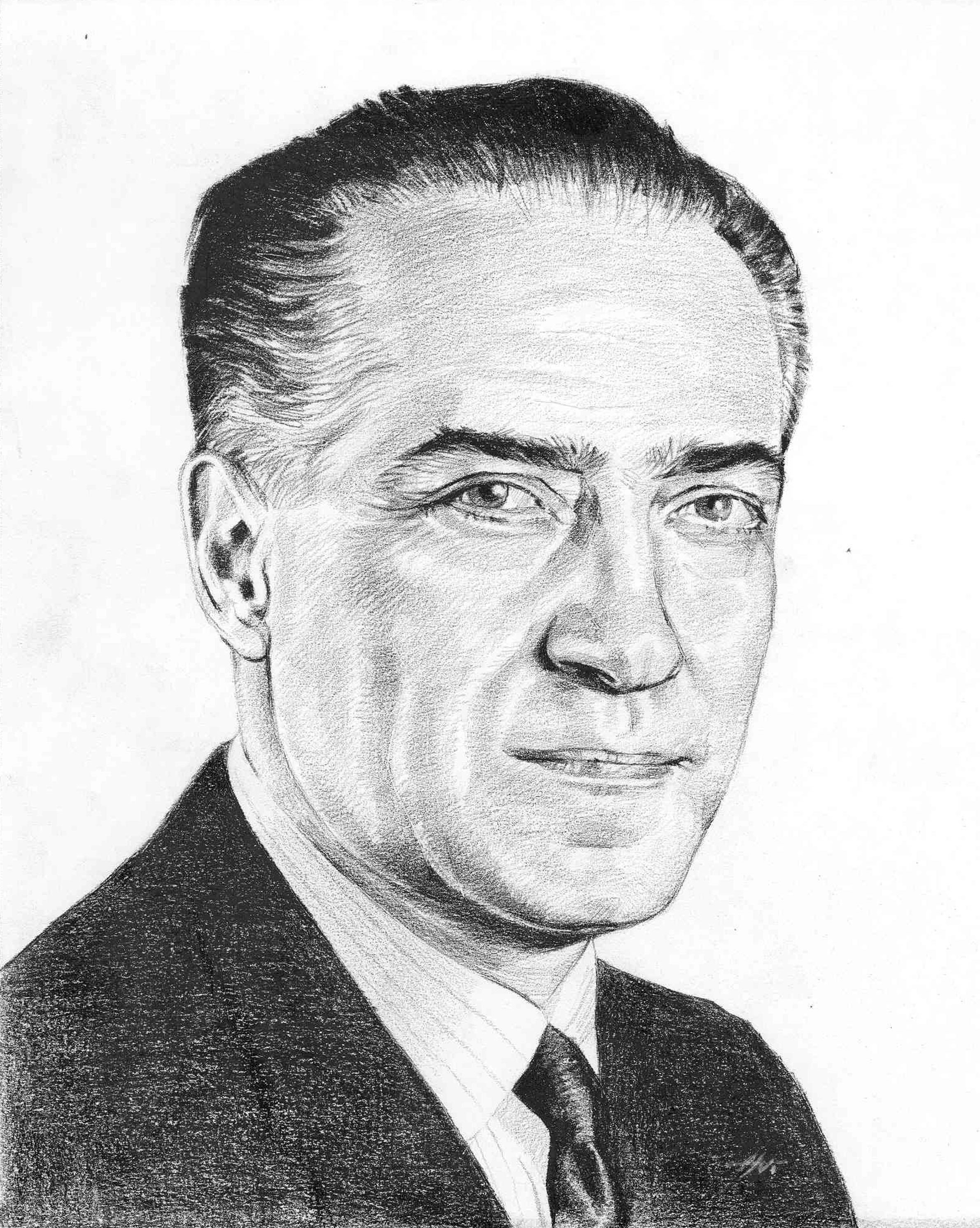
José Gómez Gordoa

José Gómez Gordoa (29 September 1913 – November 2005) was a Mexican lawyer, university professor and diplomat.

Gómez Gordoa was born in the city of San Luis Potosí in 1913. He served as the rector of the Escuela Libre de Derecho in 1977 and again in 1979–1984. In 1977 he replaced Gustavo Díaz Ordaz as ambassador to Spain, where he remained for two years.
