= Dudley Sutphin =

American tennis player, attorney, and judge

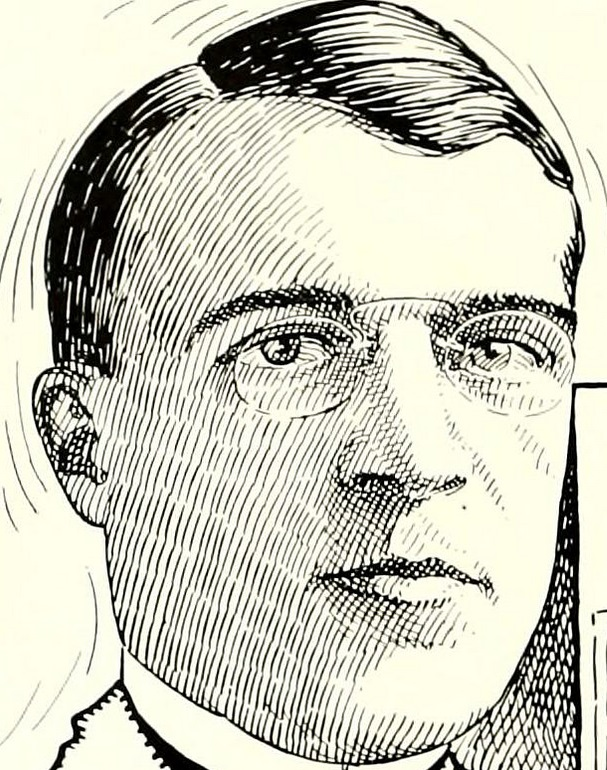
- Born: October 25, 1875; Dayton, Ohio, U.S.
- Died: May 18, 1926 (aged 50); New York City, New York, U.S.
- Education: Cincinnati Law School

Dudley Vanness Sutphin (October 25, 1875 – May 18, 1926) was a prominent resident of Cincinnati, Ohio, a well-known attorney and judge, a French Legion of Honor medal winner, and an outstanding amateur tennis player.

== Education & career ==
Sutphin graduated from the Franklin School in Cincinnati and went on to Yale University where he was a member of the Freshman Crew team (which rowed on the River Thames in England against Harvard and Columbia^{1}). He also was a member of the tennis team and Delta Kappa Epsilon.

After spending the summer of 1897 abroad with fellow Cincinnatian and Yale graduate Charles B. DeCamp, Sutphin entered the University of Cincinnati College of Law from which he graduated in 1900. While there he was a member of Phi Delta Phi.

He was admitted to Ohio Bar in June 1900, and after working at several firms (Holhster & Hollister, Kittredge & Wilby and practicing alone from 1904 to 1908), he formed a firm in 1910 with Walter A. DeCamp under the name DeCamp & Sutphin, which in 1920 would become DeCamp, Sutphin & Brumleve. He continued with that firm until his retirement.

He also was a vice-president of Third National Bank of Cincinnati; assistant city solicitor of Cincinnati; judge of Superior Court; treasurer of the board of Trustees of the Mount Auburn Presbyterian Church; and vice-president, secretary and treasurer of Cincinnati's Yale Club.

He was commissioned as a Major in the Judge Advocate General's Department, Officers' Reserve Corps, on July 18, 1917, and assigned to the Headquarters of the Central Department at Chicago on August 1.

In September of that year, he went to Fort Sam Houston, Texas, as Assistant Judge Advocate and later as Judge Advocate in the investigation, preparation, and trial by court martial of the Houston Riot cases, which were riots by the Third Battalion, 24th United States Infantry. The riot was a mutiny by 150 black soldiers which lasted one afternoon and resulted in the deaths of four soldiers and 15 civilians. The rioters were tried at three courts-martial. Fourteen were executed, and forty-one were given life sentences.

Sutphin was promoted to Lieutenant Colonel on October 25, 1918.

After the armistice of World War I, he served as Judge Advocate and as Commanding Officer of the Rents, Requisitions, and Claims Department of American Embarkation Center at Le Mans, France. There, he was decorated with the French Legion of Honor on April 26, 1919.

Sutphin left the army on August 29, 1919, and returned to Cincinnati where he practiced law until his retirement in 1921 on account of ill health.

Although his official cause of death was tuberculosis (which was due in part from a disease he contracted while in France), it occurred following an operation at what is now St. Luke's-Roosevelt Hospital Center in New York City. He was buried in Spring Grove Cemetery in Cincinnati.

In 1927, his wife Mary established the Dudley V. Sutphin Scholarship at the University of Cincinnati College of Law. The scholarship is awarded to entering students with a bachelor's degree in Liberal Arts or Business Administration, and preference is given to residents of Cincinnati.

== Family ==
His father (Isaac Vanness Sutphin, an 1869 graduate of Delaware College) founded the I. V. Sutphin Company in Cincinnati, a paper makers' supplies company. Dudley Sutphin was the oldest of three brothers - Samuel B. Sutphin and Stuart B. Sutphin, both of whom also graduated from Yale.

Sutphin married Mary Perin Harrison Sutphin on November 14, 1901, and together they had a daughter, Elizabeth, on June 9, 1905, in Cincinnati. (They also had a son, Dudley Jr., who was born and died in 1911.) Elizabeth married Hulbert Taft Jr., nephew of William Howard Taft, the 27th President of the United States.

== Tennis ==
On September 23, 1899, Sutphin reached the singles final of the first "Cincinnati Open", only to lose to Nat Emerson, 8–6, 6–1, 10–8. Emerson would go on to be ranked as high as No. 7 in the United States, and the "Cincinnati Open" would go on as well. Today, it is known as the Cincinnati Masters, is one of the biggest tennis tournaments in the world, and the oldest tournament in the United States played in its original city.

As President of the Cincinnati Lawn Tennis Association from 1899 to 1902, Sutphin was one of the individuals who founded the Cincinnati Masters. He also was a member of the Cincinnati Tennis Club.

In the Indiana State Championship, Sutphin won the doubles title in 1908 and was a singles quarterfinalist. In the 1913 event he was a doubles finalist, and in 1915 he reached the third round in singles before falling to eventual tournament champion and future International Tennis Hall of Famer Charles S. Garland.

== Sources ==
- Obituary Record Of Yale Graduates from 1925 to 1926 (Bulletin of Yale University)
- ^{1}New York Times, June 17, 1894, page 19
- From Club Court to Center Court by Phillip S. Smith (2008 Edition; ISBN 978-0-9712445-7-3).
