= Johnson N. Camden =

American politician

Johnson Newlon Camden
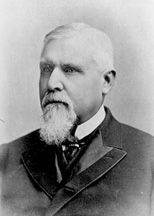
- Camden c. 1881–1908

United States Senator from West Virginia
- In office March 4, 1881 – March 3, 1887
- Preceded by: Frank Hereford
- Succeeded by: Charles J. Faulkner
- In office January 25, 1893 – March 3, 1895
- Preceded by: John E. Kenna
- Succeeded by: Stephen B. Elkins

Personal details
- Born: Johnson Newlon Camden; March 6, 1828 Lewis County, Virginia, US (now West Virginia)
- Died: April 25, 1908 (aged 80) Baltimore, Maryland, US
- Party: Democratic
- Spouse: Anna Gaither Thompson
- Children: Johnson N. Camden Jr. George Camden; Annie Camden Spilman

Johnson Newlon Camden (March 6, 1828 – April 25, 1908) was a prominent oilman, industrialist, banker, railroad tycoon, and politician who was estimated to be worth $25 million at the time of his unexpected death. Although both of his attempts to become governor of the new state of West Virginia failed, he did become United States Senator, representing West Virginia on two occasions.

== Early and family life ==
Born in 1828 in Collins Settlement, the county seat of Lewis County, Virginia (now West Virginia), to Col. John Scrivener Camden (1798–1862) and his wife, the former Nancy Newlon, Johnson Newlon Camden was the grandson of Rev. Henry Benjamin Camden, who freed his slaves in Maryland in 1804 and moved west to what became Harrison County, West Virginia during the American Civil War. Johnson Camden's siblings included Dr. Thomas Bland Camden, CSA Lt. Col. Edwin Duncan Camden (1840–1922) of the 25th Virginia Infantry, William D. Camden (1842–1878), Amanda McKinley, Lorenzo Dow Camden (1844–1910) and John Scrivener Camden Jr. (1851–1923). Their uncle, Judge Gideon D. Camden of Harrison County, resigned his judicial position as the Civil War began and declined to become a delegate to the Confederate Congress and later became a West Virginia state senator.

Johnson N. Camden attended school in Sutton and at age 14 apprenticed with his uncle Gideon, who was then an assistant county clerk in Weston. In 1846, Johnson Camden won an appointment as a cadet at the United States Military Academy at West Point while his father represented Braxton, Lewis and Gilmer counties in the Virginia House of Delegates for a single term (1845–46). The younger Camden left West Point in 1848, to read law in his home state.

On June 22, 1858, in Wheeling, Johnson N. Camden married Anne Thompson (1834–1918), daughter of prominent lawyer George W. Thompson, who had become a U.S. congressman and was then a prominent local judge. They would have children Johnson N. Camden Jr. (1865–1942) and Annie Camden Spilman (1862–1958), but their son George died as an infant.

== Law and politics ==
Camden was admitted to the Virginia bar and began his practice in Sutton, the Braxton County seat, in 1851. Although his father continued to live in Lewis County, Johnson's brothers Edwin, William and Lorenzo had moved to Braxton County. Young Johnson N. Camden was appointed the same year as Braxton County's prosecuting attorney. In 1852 he won election as prosecuting attorney for Nicholas County.

In 1858, Camden moved to Parkersburg, on the Ohio River. There he began investing in land. The following year, he moved to Burning Springs, site of an oil boom in 1860 which made him rich. Camden became involved in oil refining and coal mining and sold part of his interest for $100,000. He went into business with his brother-in-law John S. McKinley; they sold their oil interests for $410,000 in 1866, and invested the proceeds in several new industries. Camden Consolidated Oil Company was ultimately acquired by Standard Oil. Camden also consolidated several small railroads, which helped transport great quantities of coal.

Camden sympathized with the Union and did not serve in either army during the American Civil War, although CSA General Stonewall Jackson had been raised nearby. His younger brother Edwin Duncan Camden became lieutenant colonel of the 25th Virginia Infantry, and after his capture became one of the Immortal 600 (hostages used by the Union as human shields in South Carolina as a retaliation for Confederate treatment of Union prisoners of war).

Camden became president of the First National Bank of Parkersburg at its organization in 1862, and was an unsuccessful Democratic candidate for Governor of West Virginia in 1868 and again in 1872. The legislature elected him as a Democrat to the U.S. Senate, where he served one term, from March 4, 1881, to March 4, 1887. He then resumed the practice of law at Parkersburg. Upon the death in office of U.S. Senator John E. Kenna, Camden was again elected by the legislature and served the remainder of that term, from January 25, 1893, to March 3, 1895, then retired from elective politics. While in the Senate, Camden was chairman of the Committee to Audit and Control the Contingent Expense (Fifty-third Congress) and a member of the Committee on Railroads (Fifty-third Congress). He continued his former business and civic pursuits.

== Death and legacy ==
Camden died in Baltimore, Maryland, en route back to Weston, West Virginia, after visiting family. His son, Johnson N. Camden Jr., was a U.S. Senator from Kentucky in the 63rd Congress.

In 1903–04, Camden built the Union Trust & Deposit Co./Union Trust National Bank at Parkersburg. It was listed on the National Register of Historic Places in 1982. Camden also owned lumber and hotel interests in Lanes Bottom, West Virginia (now known as Camden-on-Gauley).

Party political offices
| Preceded by Benjamin H. Smith | Democratic nominee for Governor of West Virginia; 1868 | Succeeded by John J. Jacob |
| Preceded by John J. Jacob | Democratic nominee for Governor of West Virginia; 1872 | Succeeded by Henry M. Mathews |
U.S. Senate
| Preceded by Frank Hereford | U.S. senator (Class 1) from West Virginia; March 4, 1881 – March 3, 1887; Served alongside: Henry G. Davis, John E. Kenna | Succeeded by Charles J. Faulkner |
| Preceded by John E. Kenna | U.S. senator (Class 2) from West Virginia; January 25, 1893 – March 3, 1895; Served alongside: Charles J. Faulkner | Succeeded by Stephen B. Elkins |
