= Arthur Inkersley =

English journalist and writer

Arthur Inkersley (born 5 September 1855) was an English journalist and writer active in the United States. He contributed to the Scientific American and other periodicals.

== Life ==
The only son of Thomas Teale Inkersley of Birmingham, a master in chancery, he was educated at King Edward's School, Birmingham. He matriculated at Brasenose College, Oxford in 1873 at age 18, graduating B.A. in 1878. He coxed the college's rowing eight. He then taught from 1884 at St Peter's Collegiate School, Adelaide in Australia, where his Oxford rowing experience was considered advantageous; and at Auckland College and Grammar School, New Zealand, resigning from the teaching staff in 1887.

Inkersley was registered at the Hastings College of Law of the University of California in 1888–9, with a college address in Hyde Street, San Francisco; and is recorded in the 1910 Directory of Graduates of the University of California as a journalist living on 10th Street in Oakland, of Oxford, and class of 1890. He graduated Phi Delta Phi, and its catalogue of 1897 mentions that he tutored in law and classics, and Lippincott's Monthly Magazine and the California Illustrated Magazine as periodicals for which he wrote.

== Works ==
Inkersley wrote in Outing vol. XXV (1894–95) on San Francisco's Olympic Club and as a sports reporter on rowing, yachting, college football and track and field. In 1897 he took part in the Mazamas expedition to Mount Rainier, writing an article on it in 1901 for Good Words, illustrated with photographs by Edward S. Curtis. He wrote in 1898 for the Strand Magazine on the Chinese opera in California.

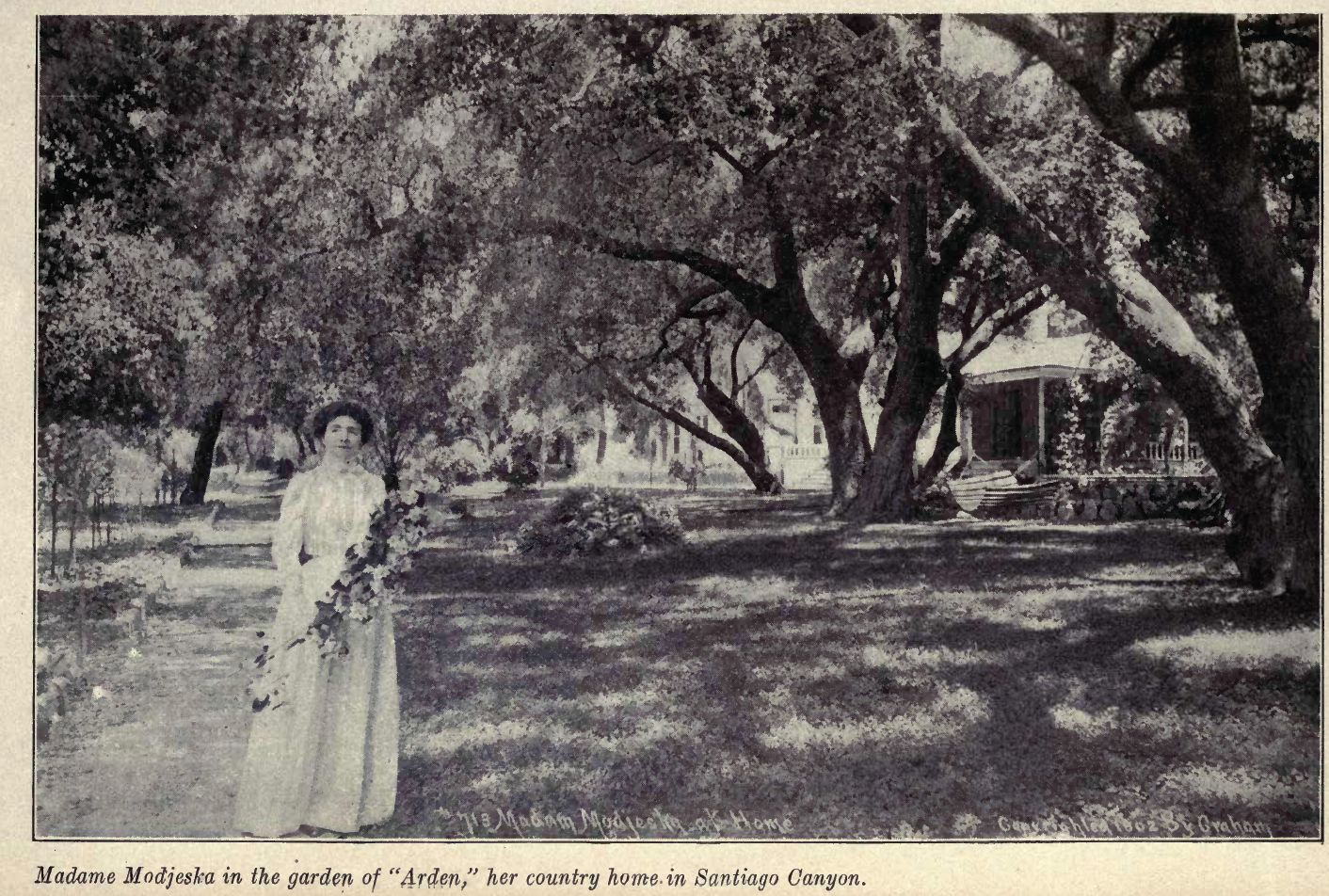
Madam Modjeska in her garden on "Arden", her country home in Santiago canyon, illustration from Overland Monthly, February 1911, article "Modjeska's Life in California" by Arthur Inkersley, on Helena Modjeska

With a friend, A. Daw-Kerrell, Inkersley produced private-press books as the Anglo-Californian Publishing Co. during the 1890s.

The aftermath of the 1906 San Francisco earthquake saw Inkersley write articles of reportage and prospect: "Effects of the earthquake and fire upon the City of San Francisco and its buildings" (May) in Scientific American; "Salving "Fireproof" Safes and Their Contents After the Great Fire of San Francisco" (May) in Scientific American; "An Amateur's Experience of Earthquake and Fire" (June) in Camera Craft; "What San Francisco Has to Start With," Overland Monthly (June–July); "Recovering Metals Melted in the San Francisco Fire" (October) in Scientific American;

== Family ==
In 1910 Inkersley married in Salisbury Cathedral Frances Fearn, widow of Walker Fearn. Her parents were James and Clarice Hewitt of Louisville. At the time Inkersley was described in the San Francisco Daily Times as "a well-known contributor to local periodicals", and being of Lyme Regis in Dorset.
