= Union Trust National Bank =

- Union Trust & Deposit Co./Union Trust National Bank
- U.S. National Register of Historic Places
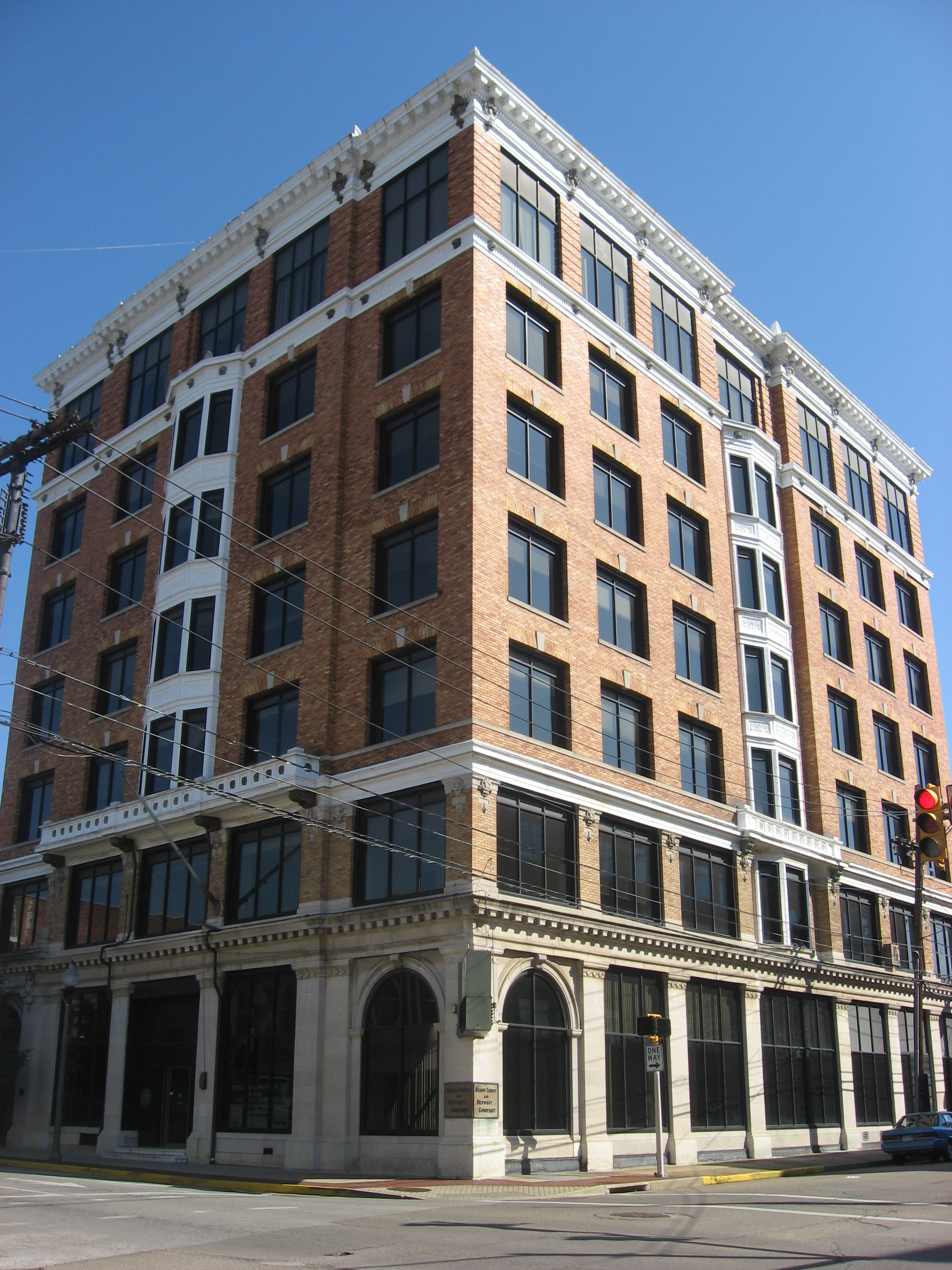
- Front and western side

- Location within West Virginia Location within the United States
- Location: 700 Market St., Parkersburg, West Virginia
- Coordinates: 39°16′0″N 81°33′28″W
- Area: less than one acre
- Built: 1903
- Architectural style: Classical Revival
- MPS: Downtown Parkersburg MRA
- NRHP reference No.: 82001791
- Added to NRHP: October 8, 1982

The Union Trust National Bank, also known as the Union Trust and Deposit Company, is a historic bank building located at Parkersburg, Wood County, West Virginia. It was built in 1903–1904, and is a seven-story, five bay by seven bay, U-shaped, masonry building in the Classical style. The central bay features a projecting three-sided bay window. The building was ordered by Senator Johnson N. Camden (1828–1908).

It was listed on the National Register of Historic Places in 1982.

== See also ==
- National Register of Historic Places listings in Wood County, West Virginia
