= 1872 West Virginia gubernatorial election =

- October 8, 1872
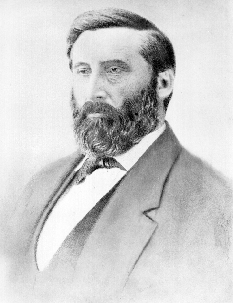

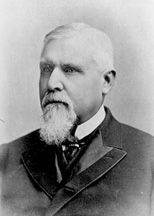
Nominee	John J. Jacob	Johnson N. Camden
Party	People's Independent	Democratic
Alliance	Republican
Popular vote	42,888	40,305
Percentage	51.55%	48.45%
- County results Jacob: 50–60% 60–70% 70–80% 80–90% Camden: 50–60% 60–70% 70–80% 80–90%
Governor before election
John J. Jacob
Democratic
Elected Governor
John J. Jacob
People's Independent

The 1872 West Virginia gubernatorial election took place on October 8, 1872, to elect the governor of West Virginia.

Incumbent John Jeremiah Jacob was denied renomination by the Democratic Party, which was controlled by Camden. Jacob ran on the ad hoc "People's Independent" ticket with Republican support. He was re-elected by 2400 votes for a four-year term. Camden's men controlled the legislature, and passed "ripper" laws that stripped Jacob of his appointment powers.

West Virginia began electing its governor to a 4-year term, starting this election. Previously the governor was elected to a 2-year term.

== Results ==
West Virginia gubernatorial election, 1872
Party	Candidate	Votes	%
People's Independent	John J. Jacob (incumbent)	42,888	51.55
Democratic	Johnson N. Camden	40,305	48.45
Total votes		83,193	100
People's Independent gain from Democratic Party (United States)			
