= Raymond J. Lynch =

American judge

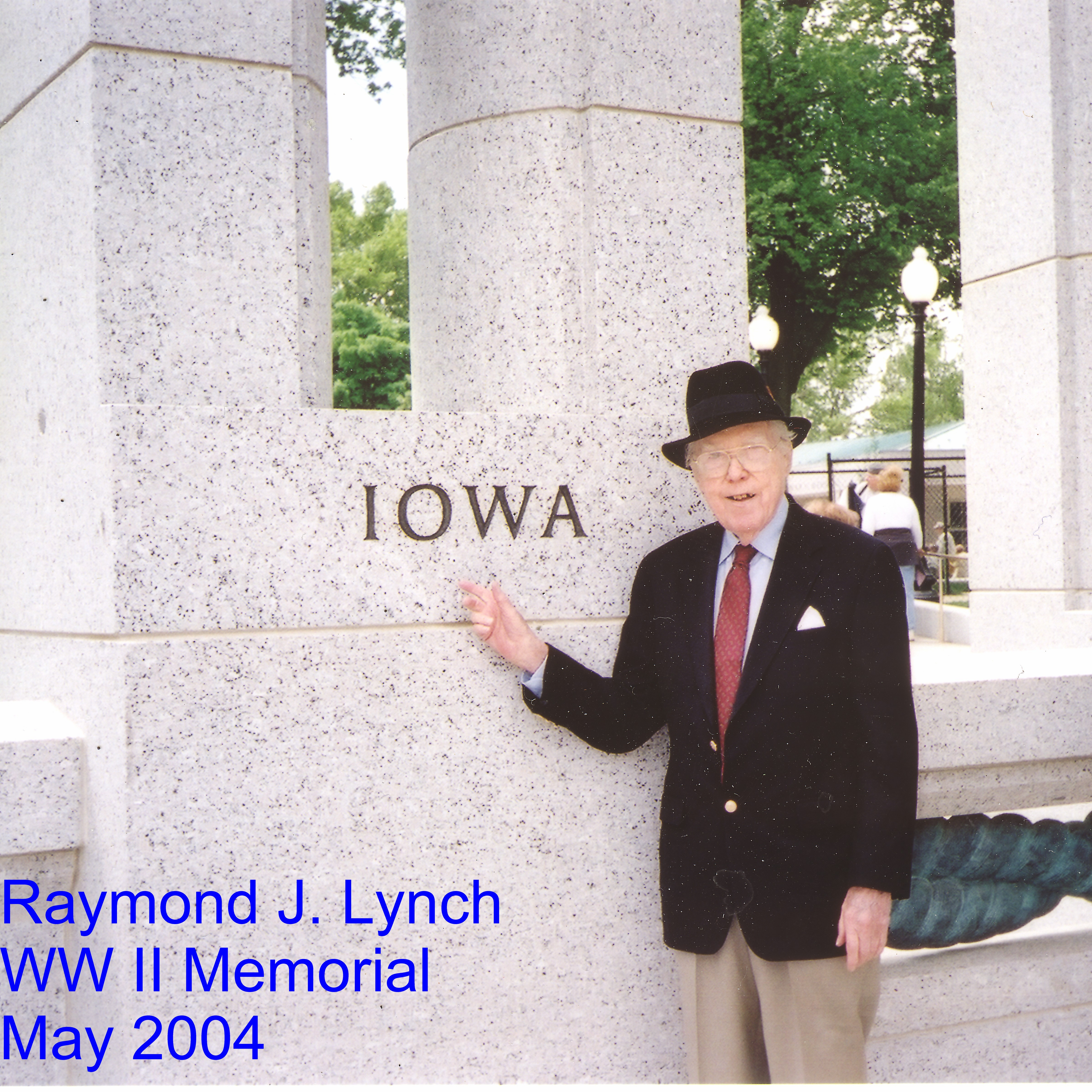
- Raymond J. Lynch at National World War II Memorial
- Born: 4 December 1909; Clinton, Iowa
- Died: 8 June 2007; Bethesda, Maryland
- Occupation(s): Attorney, Administrative Law Judge
- Spouse: Mary Catherine McCormick
- Children: Mary Rae, Kathleen (Holly) and Anne
- Parent: Albert Joseph & Theresa Weinbeck Lynch

Raymond J. Lynch (December 4, 1909 – June 8, 2007) was an Administrative Law Judge for the Federal Trade Commission.

== Early life ==
Raymond J. Lynch was born in Clinton, Iowa, December 4, 1909. He was the son of Albert Joseph and Theresa Weinbeck Lynch. His great grandparents, Michael and Bridget Flemming Lynch settled in Clinton County, Iowa, in 1840, the same year the County was established. He attended St. Mary's grade school and in 1928 he graduated from St. Mary's High School in Clinton. He received his BA from the University of Iowa on June 5, 1933, and his JD on July 18, 1935. He was initiated into McClain Inn of Phi Delta Phi on December 15, 1934, and was admitted to practice before the Iowa Supreme Court on June 15, 1935. On November 14, 1936, he was appointed Assistant County Attorney for Clinton County, Iowa, with an office in De Witt, Iowa, but was defeated when he ran for the office of County Attorney in November 1940 .

== Move to Washington, D.C. ==
Following military service in World War II, he worked as an attorney for the United States Department of Agriculture in Washington, D.C., and subsequently was a hearing examiner for the Civil Aeronautics Board. He retired as an Administrative Law Judge for the Federal Trade Commission. Significant decisions made in that capacity include the L.G. Balfour decision in August 1967, the 1973 Corning Glass decision and the Wonder Bread decision announced on November 5, 1973. It was in this case that he stated "Opinion based on opinion is like stepping on the springboard of imagination and springing into the realm of conjecture", an expression that he had remembered from his student days at the University of Iowa College of Law forty years earlier.

== Family life ==
On April 12, 1937, he married Mary Catherine McCormick at Immaculate Conception Catholic church in Cedar Rapids, Iowa. She died on December 10, 2000.
