= Kanawha, West Virginia =

- Census-designated place
- Location within West Virginia Location within the United States
- Coordinates: 39°11′56″N 81°27′36″W
- Country: United States
- State: West Virginia
- County: Wood
- Elevation: 627 ft (191 m)
- Time zone: UTC-5 (Eastern (EST))
  - Summer (DST): UTC-4 (EDT)
- Area codes: 304 & 681
- GNIS feature ID: 2807515

Kanawha is an unincorporated community in Wood County, West Virginia, United States. As of the 2020 census, Kanawha had a population of 430. Kanawha is located on West Virginia Route 47, 7 miles (11 km) southeast of Parkersburg.
