= Nathan Goff Jr. =

American judge (1843–1920)

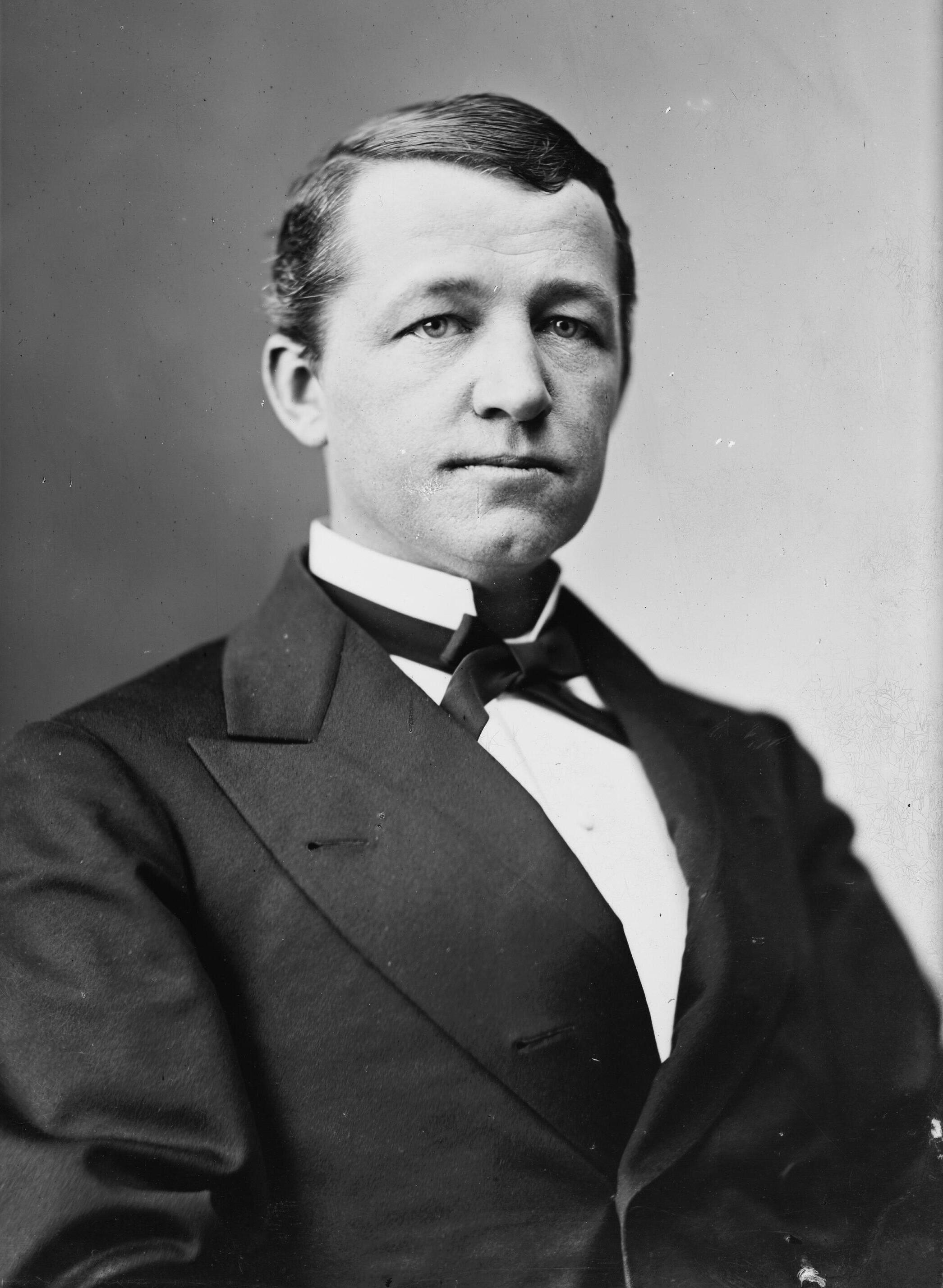

United States Senator from West Virginia
- In office April 1, 1913 – March 3, 1919
- Preceded by: Clarence Wayland Watson
- Succeeded by: Davis Elkins

Judge of the United States Court of Appeals for the Fourth Circuit
- In office March 17, 1892 – March 31, 1913
- Appointed by: Benjamin Harrison
- Preceded by: Seat established by 26 Stat. 826
- Succeeded by: Charles Albert Woods

Judge of the United States Circuit Courts for the Fourth Circuit
- In office March 17, 1892 – December 31, 1911
- Appointed by: Benjamin Harrison
- Preceded by: Seat established by 26 Stat. 826
- Succeeded by: Seat abolished

Member of the U.S. House of Representatives from West Virginia's 1st district
- In office March 4, 1883 – March 3, 1889
- Preceded by: Benjamin Wilson
- Succeeded by: John O. Pendleton

28th United States Secretary of the Navy
- In office January 7, 1881 – March 4, 1881
- President: Rutherford B. Hayes
- Preceded by: Richard W. Thompson
- Succeeded by: William H. Hunt

Personal details
- Born: Nathan Goff Jr. February 9, 1843 Clarksburg, Virginia (now West Virginia), U.S.
- Died: April 24, 1920 (aged 77) Clarksburg, West Virginia, U.S.
- Resting place: Odd Fellows Cemetery; Clarksburg, West Virginia
- Party: Republican
- Children: Guy D. Goff
- Relatives: Louise Goff Reece (granddaughter)
- Education: New York University School of Law (LLB)

Military service
- Branch/service: (United States) Union Army
- Years of service: 1861–around 1864
- Rank: Major
- Unit: 3rd West Virginia Infantry Regiment; 4th West Virginia Cavalry Regiment
- Battles/wars: American Civil War

Nathan Goff Jr. (February 9, 1843 – April 23, 1920) was a United States representative from West Virginia, a Union Army officer, the 28th United States Secretary of the Navy during the administration of President Rutherford B. Hayes, a United States circuit judge of the United States Court of Appeals for the Fourth Circuit and of the United States Circuit Courts for the Fourth Circuit and a United States senator from West Virginia.

== Early life and education ==
Born on February 9, 1843, at his family's estate Waldomore in Clarksburg, Harrison County, Virginia (now West Virginia), to Waldo Goff, who had five times won election to represent Harrison County in the Virginia House of Delegates. Goff attended the Northwestern Academy in Clarksburg and Georgetown University in Washington, D.C. He received a Bachelor of Laws in 1866 from New York University School of Law.

== American Civil War ==
Although his family owned several slaves, they favored the Union. During the American Civil War, Goff joined the Union Army in 1861; enlisting in the 3rd West Virginia Infantry Regiment. He later became a major in the 4th West Virginia Cavalry Regiment.

== Postwar career ==
Goff became editor of the Clarksburg Telegraph beginning in 1866. Admitted to the bar, he began his private legal practice in Clarksburg from 1866 to 1867. He won election to the West Virginia House of Delegates from 1867 to 1868.

Goff then became the United States Attorney for the District of West Virginia from 1868 to 1881, and from 1881 to 1882. He served as the 28th United States Secretary of the Navy in 1881.

However, Goff failed to win election to Congress as a Republican candidate in 1870 and 1874. He was also the Republican candidate for Governor of West Virginia in 1876 and 1888, but voters instead elected the Democrat.

== United States representative ==
Goff was elected as a Republican from West Virginia's 1st congressional district to the United States House of Representatives of the 48th, 49th and 50th United States Congresses, serving from March 4, 1883, to March 3, 1889. He was not a candidate for renomination. Following his departure from Congress, Goff resumed private practice in Clarksburg from 1889 to 1892.

== Federal judicial service ==
Goff was nominated by President Benjamin Harrison on December 16, 1891, to the United States Court of Appeals for the Fourth Circuit and the United States Circuit Courts for the Fourth Circuit, to a new joint seat authorized by 26 Stat. 826. He was confirmed by the United States Senate on March 17, 1892, and received his commission the same day. On December 31, 1911, the Circuit Courts were abolished and he thereafter served only on the Court of Appeals. His service terminated on March 31, 1913, due to his resignation.

== United States senator ==
In 1913, Goff was nominated for the United States Senate by state delegate Roy Earl Parrish. He was elected by the state legislature over Democrat Clarence W. Watson, receiving 60 votes to Watson's 43. Though his Senate term commenced March 4, 1913, he did not immediately take his seat, preferring to remain on the federal bench, and served from April 1, 1913, to March 3, 1919. He was not a candidate for reelection in 1918, the first time under the Seventeenth Amendment that the seat was filled by popular vote. He was Chairman of the Committee on Conservation of Natural Resources for the 65th United States Congress and Chairman of the Committee on Industrial Expositions for the 65th United States Congress.

== Death ==
Goff died on April 23, 1920, in Clarksburg. He was interred in Odd Fellows Cemetery in Clarksburg. He was the last surviving member of the Hayes Cabinet.

== Family ==
Goff was the father of West Virginia United States Senator Guy D. Goff and grandfather of United States Representative from Tennessee Louise Goff Reece.

== Home ==
Goff's home at Clarksburg, the Nathan Goff Jr. House, was listed on the National Register of Historic Places in 1976. It was delisted in 1994, after demolition in 1993.

== Namesake ==
The World War II destroyer USS Goff was named in his honor.

== Sources ==
- United States Congress. "Nathan Goff Jr. (id: G000255)". Biographical Directory of the United States Congress.
- McKinney, Gordon (1978). Southern mountain Republicans, 1865-1900 : politics and the Appalachian community. Chapel Hill: University of North Carolina Press. ISBN 0-8078-1300-1.
- Smith, G. Wayne (1953). "Nathan Goff, Jr., In the Civil War*".

Party political offices
Preceded by John J. Jacob	Republican nominee for Governor of West Virginia; 1876	Succeeded by George Cookman Sturgiss
Preceded by Edwin Maxwell	Republican nominee for Governor of West Virginia; 1888	Succeeded by Thomas Davis
Political offices
Preceded by Richard W. Thompson	28th United States Secretary of the Navy; 1881	Succeeded by William H. Hunt
U.S. House of Representatives
Preceded by Benjamin Wilson	United States Representative from West Virginia's 1st congressional district 1883–1889	Succeeded by John O. Pendleton
Legal offices
Preceded by Seat established by 26 Stat. 826	Judge of the United States Circuit Courts for the Fourth Circuit; 1892–1911	Succeeded by Seat abolished
Preceded by Seat established by 26 Stat. 826	Judge of the United States Court of Appeals for the Fourth Circuit; 1892–1913	Succeeded by Charles Albert Woods
U.S. Senate
Preceded by Clarence Wayland Watson	United States Senator (Class 2) from West Virginia; 1913–1919; Served alongside: William E. Chilton, Howard Sutherland	Succeeded by Davis Elkins
