= John J. Jacob (West Virginia politician) =

American politician

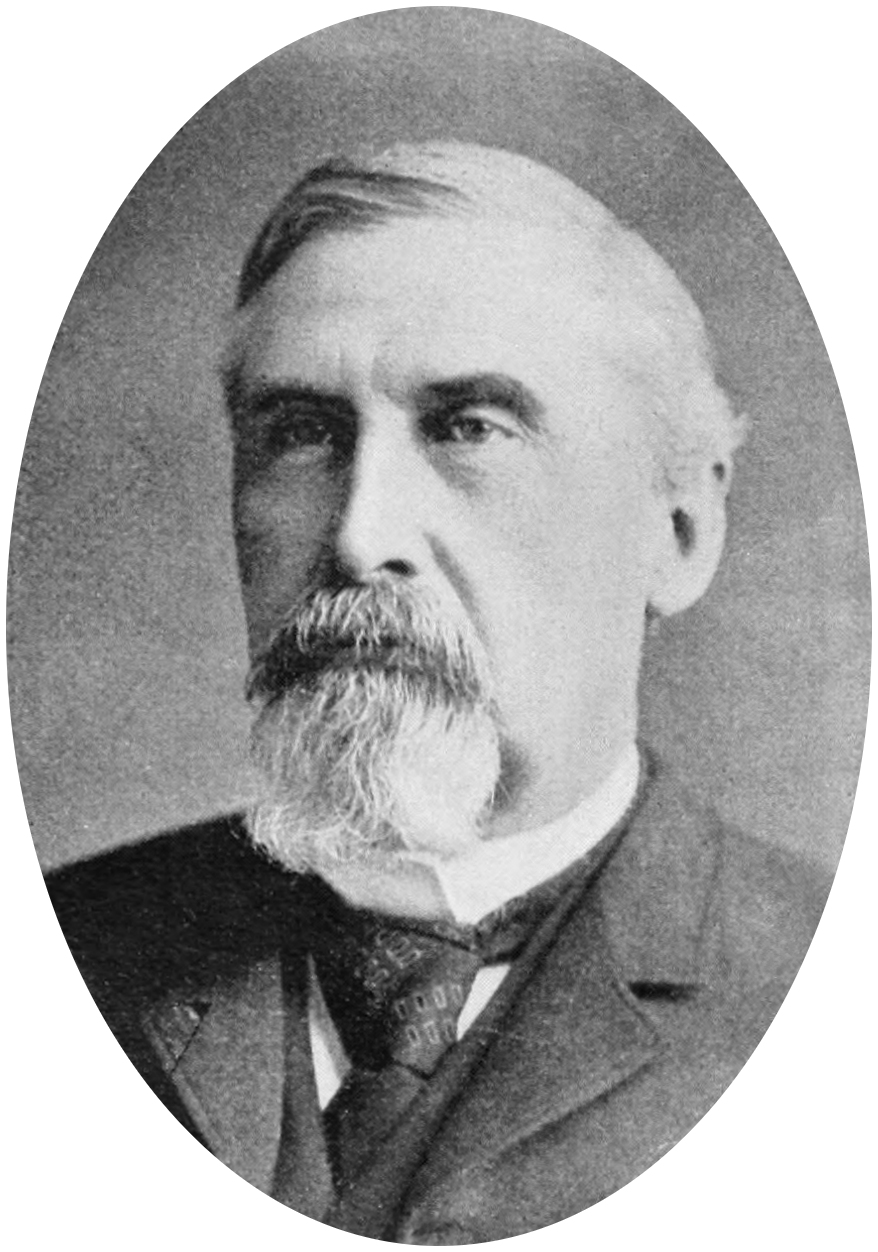

4th Governor of West Virginia
- In office March 4, 1871 – March 4, 1877
- Preceded by: William E. Stevenson
- Succeeded by: Henry M. Mathews

Member of the West Virginia House of Delegates
- In office 1868, 1879

Personal details
- Born: December 9, 1829 Green Spring, Virginia (now West Virginia)
- Died: November 24, 1893 (aged 63) Wheeling, West Virginia
- Party: Democratic
- Spouse: Jane Baird
- Profession: Politician

John Jeremiah Jacob (December 9, 1829 – November 24, 1893) was an American Democratic politician from Green Spring in (Hampshire County), in the U.S. state of West Virginia. Jacob served two terms as the fourth governor of West Virginia from 1871 to 1877. He was also elected to the West Virginia House of Delegates from Hampshire County in 1868 and from Ohio County in 1879.

== Background ==
John Jeremiah Jacob was born in Green Spring, Virginia on the Potomac River, north of Romney. Jacob's Hampshire County roots made him the first of West Virginia's governors to be born within the present-day borders of the state. He attended the Romney Academy in Romney and Dickinson College in Carlisle, Pennsylvania.

Jacob practiced law and taught school in Hampshire County before accepting a teaching position at the University of Missouri in 1853. In 1858, he married Jane Baird. Jacob worked as an attorney in Missouri during the American Civil War and returned to Romney after the war in 1865 to establish a law practice. In 1868, he was elected to the West Virginia House of Delegates.

== Governor (1871–1877) ==
Jacob was elected governor in 1870 to a two-year term making him the first of six consecutive Democratic governors. He supported the elimination of all remaining legislation that discriminated against former Confederates. Jacob also presided over the establishment of new facilities to care for the mentally handicapped and the creation of statewide schools, known as normal schools, to train teachers. Most of these schools still exist as part of the state college system.

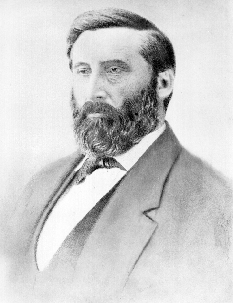
Portrait of John Jeremiah Jacob as Governor of West Virginia

During Jacob's tenure as governor, West Virginia's state constitution was re-written. Moderates and former Confederate supporters themselves believed the original 1863 constitution was too biased in favor of pro-Union supporters. A new constitutional convention, controlled by Democrats, met in Charleston in 1872. The new constitution restricted the power of the legislature and expanded the governor's term in office from two to four years, but prohibiting consecutive terms (effective with the 1876 election).

In 1872, Jacob was denied re-nomination by the Democratic Party, which was controlled by industrialist Johnson N. Camden. Jacob ran on the ad hoc "People's Independent" ticket with Republican support. He was re-elected by 2,400 votes over Camden, whom the Democrats had nominated in Jacob's place, for a four-year term. Camden's men controlled the legislature, however, and passed "ripper" laws that stripped Jacob of his appointment powers.

In 1875, the state government moved from Charleston and returned the capital to Wheeling in Ohio County. After Jacob left the governor's office, he remained in Wheeling and served once again in the West Virginia House of Delegates, this time from Ohio County, in 1879. He also served as the county's circuit judge from 1881 to 1888. Jacob continued to practice law in Wheeling until his death in 1893, aged 63.

== See also ==
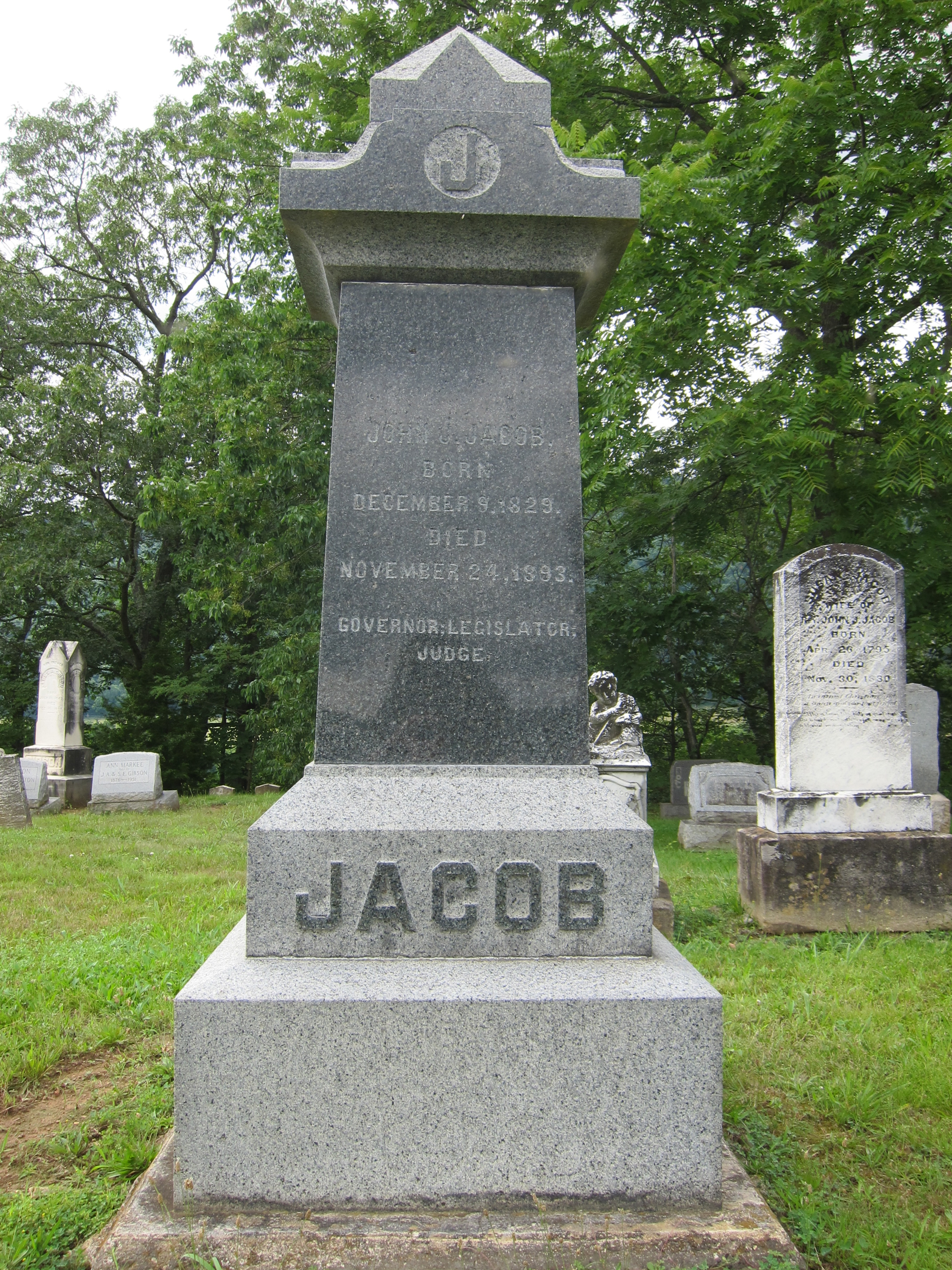
Gravestone at the interment site of John J. Jacob at Indian Mound Cemetery in Romney, West Virginia

- List of governors of West Virginia

Party political offices
Preceded by Johnson N. Camden	Democratic nominee for Governor of West Virginia; 1870	Succeeded by Johnson N. Camden
Preceded by William E. Stevenson	Republican nominee for Governor of West Virginia; Endorsed; 1872	Succeeded by Nathan Goff Jr.
Political offices
Preceded by William E. Stevenson	Governor of West Virginia; 1871–1877	Succeeded by Henry M. Mathews
