= Boreman =

Boreman is a surname. Notable people with the surname include:

- Arthur I. Boreman (1823–1896), the first governor of the US state of West Virginia
- Herbert Stephenson Boreman (1897–1982), United States federal judge
- Jacob S. Boreman (1831–1913), Justice of the Supreme Court of the Utah Territory
- Laurane Tanner Bullock Boreman (1830–1904), the wife of former Governor of West Virginia Arthur I. Boreman
- Linda Susan Boreman (1949–2002), early pornographic actress.
- Madison Boreman (born 1998), American steeplechaser

== See also ==
- Boreman, West Virginia
- Boreman Hall, a residence hall on the campus of West Virginia University in Morgantown, West Virginia
- Borman
