= Mary Ireland Farnsworth =

American First Lady of West Virginia

- Born: May 30, 1830; Upshur County, West Virginia
- Died: February 22, 1923 (aged 92)
- Known for: First lady of West Virginia, 1869

Mary Ireland Farnsworth (1830–1923) was the wife of Governor of West Virginia Daniel D. T. Farnsworth and was that state's First Lady I n 1869. She was born on May 1, 1830, at Upshur County, West Virginia, a niece of Confederate General Thomas "Stonewall" Jackson. She was first lady for five days while her husband completed the unexpired term of Arthur I. Boreman, who had resigned to enter the United States Senate. After leaving office, the Farnsworths moved to Buckhannon, West Virginia. She died on February 22, 1923.

Honorary titles
Preceded by Laurane Tanner Bullock Boreman	First Lady of West Virginia; 1869–1869	Succeeded by Sarah Clotworthy Stevenson
