= Van Winkle House =

Van Winkle House may refer to:

== New Jersey ==
- Van Winkle House (Franklin Lakes, New Jersey)
- Jacob W. Van Winkle House in Lyndhurst, New Jersey
- Van Winkle-Fox House in Oakland, New Jersey

== West Virginia ==
- Peter G. Van Winkle House, now demolished, at 600 Juliana Street in Parkersburg, West Virginia
- Van Winkle-Wix House in Parkersburg, West Virginia, which still stands
