= 1863 West Virginia gubernatorial election =

- May 28, 1863
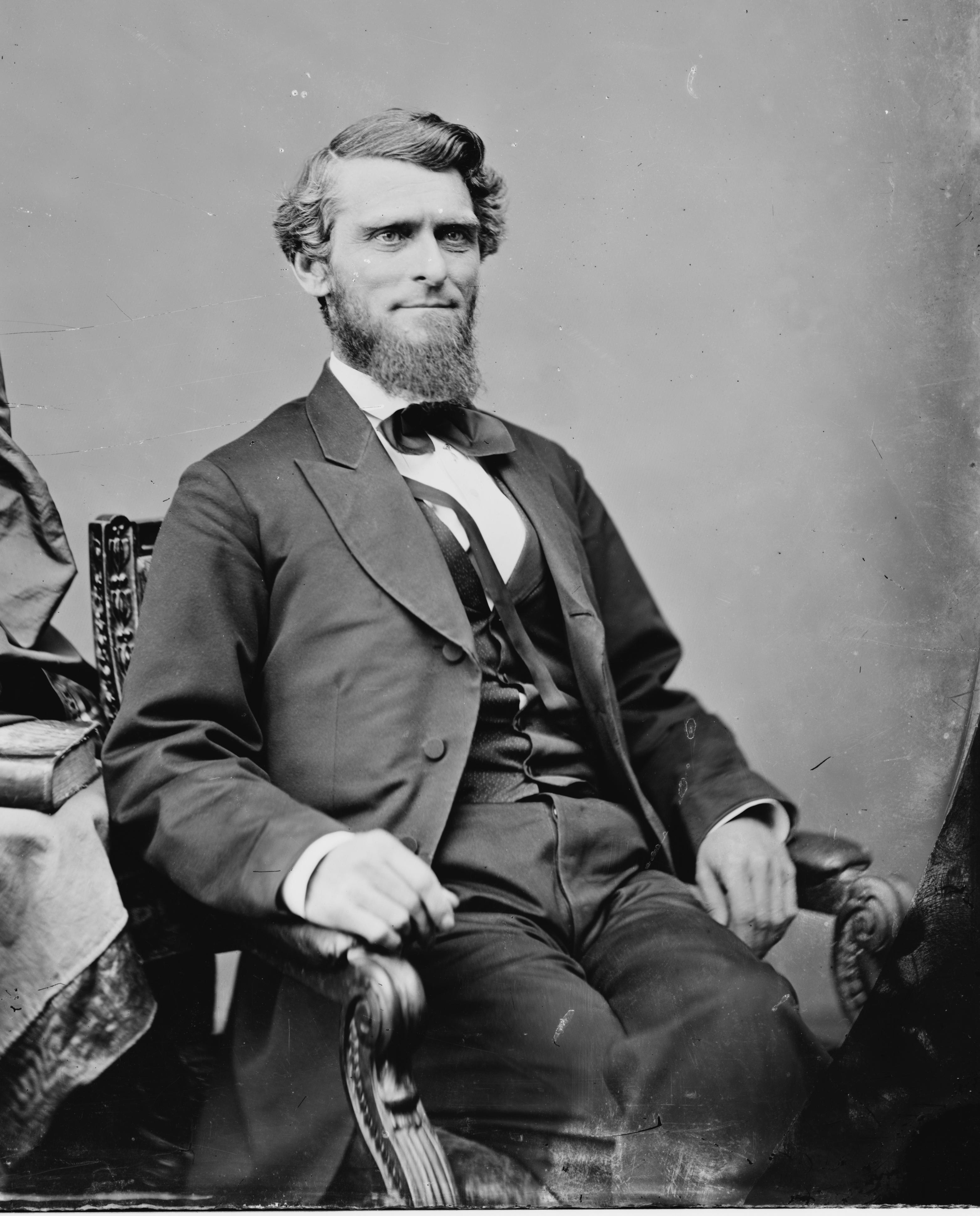
Nominee	Arthur I. Boreman
Party	National Union
Popular vote	25,797
Percentage	99.99%
- County results Boreman: >90% No votes
Governor before election
Francis Harrison Pierpont (Note: As governor of the Restored Government of Virginia)
Union
Elected Governor
Arthur I. Boreman
National Union

The 1863 West Virginia gubernatorial election was the first gubernatorial election, held on Thursday, May 28, 1863. Unionist Arthur I. Boreman was elected virtually without opposition. This was the first of two gubernatorial elections held in West Virginia during the American Civil War; 17 counties were occupied by Confederate military forces on Election Day and did not participate in the balloting.

In a contested convention held at Parkersburg, West Virginia, the Union Party nominated Judge Arthur I. Boreman over his nearest rival, Peter G. Van Winkle. Despite fissures within the statehood movement driven by the Willey Amendment, an abolitionist proposal backed by U.S. Senator Waitman T. Willey, no challenge to the Union ticket emerged from either the radical or conservative ends of the party. Secessionists loyal to the Confederacy did not recognize the legitimacy of the new state and consequently did not participate in the campaign.

Boreman received over 99 percent of the vote in 33 participating counties against only three votes for other candidates. Voter turnout was anemic, and newspapers complained of the slowness of the returns; however, by June 13, sufficient returns had been received for officials to certify Boreman's election. He was inaugurated as the first governor of West Virginia on June 20, 1863, in a ceremony at the Linsly Institute in Wheeling alongside other officers of the new state government.

== Background ==
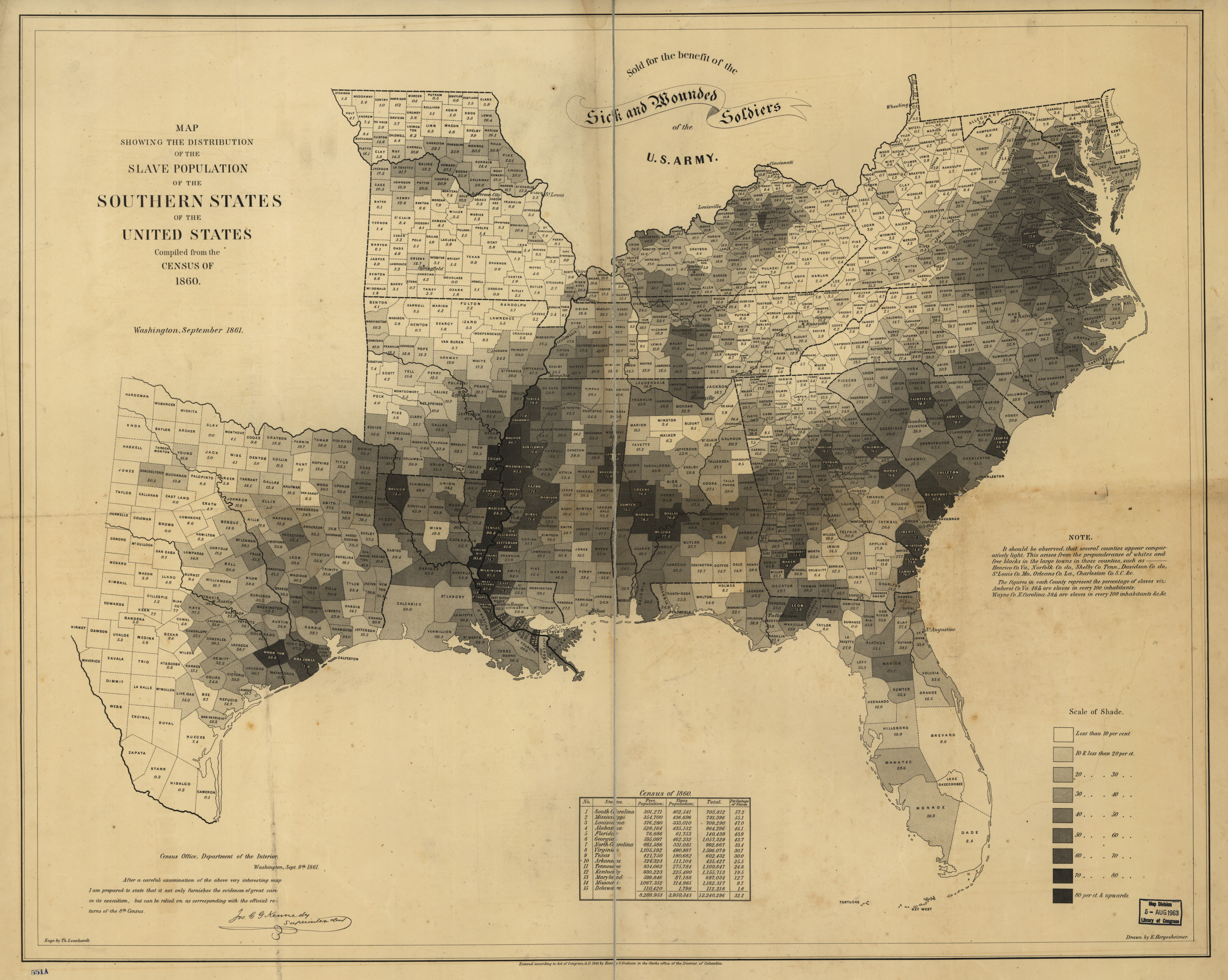
Map showing the distribution of the slave population of the United States, compiled from the census of 1860. Enslaved and free people of color cumulatively comprised just 5% of the population in the counties that became West Virginia, while exceeding a majority in the wealthy Tidewater region.

Cultural, economic, and regional differences had long separated Western Virginia from the eastern Tidewater counties that dominated political and economic life in Antebellum Virginia. Slavery dominated the Tidewater, while it had a substantially weaker presence in the western counties, which remained economically underdeveloped. By 1830, the disparity between the sections was such that Western Virginia would have elected a majority of members in the General Assembly if representation were allocated in proportion to the free population, (the "white basis,") but the Three-fifths Compromise and the mass disenfranchisement of lower-class whites allowed eastern slaveholders to dominate the Assembly and state offices, although a minority of the overall population. After 1830, the political orientation of the Shenandoah Valley shifted eastward as the region became more closely linked to slavery, while Northwestern Virginia grew increasingly alienated from the Tidewater.

Following the election of Abraham Lincoln and the commencement of hostilities between the United States and the Confederacy, the Virginia Secession Convention voted to secede from the Union on April 17, 1861; 26 of the 31 northwestern delegates voted against the ordinance. Western unionists convened the First Wheeling Convention on May 13 to discuss options for resistance in the event of Virginia's secession; following approval of the secession ordinance by a popular referendum on May 23, the Second Wheeling Convention issued the "Declaration of the People of Virginia" condemning secession as unconstitutional and treasonous, declared all state offices vacant, and installed Francis H. Pierpont as head of the Restored Government of Virginia. The success of the Western Virginia campaign established Union military control over the region and enabled unionist leaders to adopt and ratify a dismemberment ordinance between August 20 and October 24, beginning the process of formally separating from Virginia.

Although broadly popular in the Trans-Allegheny counties that had voted against secession, the new state movement divided unionist leaders. Conservatives in the Union Party privately opposed dismemberment and attempted to undermine the statehood movement by annexing a number of secessionist southwestern counties to the proposed State of Kanawha. Ultimately, fifty counties would comprise the new State of West Virginia; counties that had voted against the secession ordinance contributed 60 percent of the population of the new state, while 40 percent lived in secessionist counties, several of which remained under Confederate military occupation.

Unionists were further divided by the requirement, introduced by Congress, that West Virginia abolish slavery as a condition for statehood. Despite the opposition of such prominent unionists as John S. Carlile, the Willey Amendment (so named for its author, U.S. Senator Waitman T. Willey of Morgantown, West Virginia) was ratified by voters in March 1863, and West Virginia duly entered the Union on June 20. Nevertheless, the battle over the Willey Amendment permanently divided West Virginian Unionists. Those who had supported the amendment became known as Unconditional Unionists and eventually provided the cornerstone of the Republican Party in West Virginia, while Carlile and others who argued in defense of slavery in 1863 joined forces with Copperheads in the Democratic Party to oppose Lincoln's reelection in 1864.

== Union Party ==
=== Convention ===
From May 6 to 7, 1863, the Union Party's state convention was held to nominate candidates for multiple political offices. Each county delegation was awarded a number of votes equal to its total white population. For the party's gubernatorial nomination Samuel Crane was nominated by James G. West, Boreman was nominated by E. M. Norton, and Peter G. Van Winkle was nominated by Ben Smith.

On the first ballot Van Winkle received a plurality of the vote, but did not receive the nomination due to a majority being required. West withdrew Crane's nomination before the second ballot in which Boreman defeated Van Winkle.

=== Candidates ===
- Arthur I. Boreman, judge of the 19th circuit court of Virginia, former president of the Second Wheeling Convention and delegate from Wood County
- Samuel Crane, auditor of the Restored Government of Virginia and former delegate to the Second Wheeling Convention from Randolph and Tucker counties
- James W. Paxton
- Peter G. Van Winkle, former delegate to the Second Wheeling Convention from Wood County

=== Results ===
1863 West Virginia Union gubernatorial convention
Candidate	First ballot			Second ballot		
Candidate	County units	Votes	%	County units	Votes	%
Arthur I. Boreman	8.317	80,886	26.67	23.002	181,185	59.70
Peter G. Van Winkle	16.950	135,528	44.70	16.998	122,291	40.30
Samuel Crane	14.532	84,144	27.74			
James W. Paxton	0.200	2,636	0.87			
TOTAL	40	303,194	100.00	40	303,476	100.00

== General election ==
On May 28, 1863, Boreman won the gubernatorial election without opposition.

== Results ==
1863 West Virginia gubernatorial election
Party	Candidate	Votes	%
National Union	Arthur I. Boreman	25,797	99.99
Write-in		3	0.01
Total votes		25,780	100.00%

=== Results by county ===
County	Arthur I. Boreman Union		Total
County	Votes	Percent	Total
Barbour	770	100.00	770
Berkley	Did not participate		—
Boone	102	100.00	102
Braxton	212	100.00	212
Brooke	678	100.00	678
Cabell	Did not participate		—
Calhoun	Did not participate		—
Clay	Did not participate		—
Doddridge	742	100.00	742
Fayette	Did not participate		—
Gilmer	289	100.00	289
Greenbrier	Did not participate		—
Hampshire	135	100.00	135
Hancock	418	100.00	418
Hardy	91	100.00	91
Harrison	2,037	100.00	2,037
Jackson	534	100.00	534
Jefferson	Did not participate		—
Kanawha	655	100.00	655
Lewis	1,184	100.00	1,184
Logan	Did not participate		—
Marion	1,428	100.00	1,428
Marshall	2,067	100.00	2,067
Mason	747	100.00	747
McDowell	Did not participate		—
Mercer	Did not participate		—
Monongalia	1,585	100.00	1,585
Monroe	Did not participate		—
Morgan	261	100.00	261
Nicholas	Did not participate		—
Ohio	2,905	100.00	2,905
Pendleton	161	100.00	161
Pleasants	239	100.00	239
Pocahontas	Did not participate		—
Preston	1,639	100.00	1,639
Putnam	232	100.00	232
Raleigh	Did not participate		—
Randolph	239	100.00	239
Ritchie	667	100.00	667
Roane	177	100.00	177
Taylor	867	100.00	867
Tucker	Did not participate		—
Tyler	720	100.00	720
Upshur	879	100.00	879
Wayne	289	100.00	289
Webster	Did not participate		—
Wetzel	870	100.00	870
Wirt	375	100.00	375
Wood	1,603	100.00	1,603
Wyoming	Did not participate		—
TOTAL	25,797	99.99	25,780

== See also ==
- 1863 in West Virginia
