= 1863 in West Virginia =

- Decades: 1860s; 1870s; 1880s
- See also: History of West Virginia; Historical outline of West Virginia; List of years in West Virginia; 1863 in the United States

The following is a list of events of the year 1863 in West Virginia.

== Incumbents ==
=== State government ===
- Governor: Arthur I. Boreman (R)

== Events ==
- March 28 – Battle of Hurricane Bridge occurs in present-day Hurricane, West Virginia
- April–May – Jones–Imboden Raid occurs in present-day Fairmont, West Virginia
- June 20:
  - West Virginia becomes a state
  - Arthur I. Boreman begins interim term as West Virginia's first governor
- October 13 – Battle of Bulltown occurs in present-day Braxton County, West Virginia
- October 22 – Jacob B. Blair, William G. Brown Sr., and Kellian Whaley are elected as West Virginia's first members of the United States House of Representatives
- November 6 – Battle of Droop Mountain occurs in present day Pocahontas County, West Virginia

== See also ==
- 1863 in the United States
- 1863 West Virginia gubernatorial election
