= Judge Boreman =

Judge Boreman may refer to:

- Arthur I. Boreman (1823–1896), judge of the Wood County, Virginia, Circuit Court
- Herbert Stephenson Boreman (1897–1982), judge of the United States Court of Appeals for the Fourth Circuit
- Jacob S. Boreman (1831–1913), judge of the Common Pleas Court of Jackson County, Missouribefore becoming a justice of the Supreme Court of the Utah Territory
- Paul D. Borman (born 1939), judge of the United States District Court for the Eastern District of Michigan
