= 2026 in West Virginia =

- Decades: 2000s; 2010s; 2020s
- See also: History of West Virginia; Historical outline of West Virginia; List of years in West Virginia; 2026 in the United States

The following is a list of events of the year 2026 in West Virginia.

== Incumbents ==
=== State government ===
- Governor: Patrick Morrisey (R)

== Events ==
- April 22 – A chemical spill at a silver catalysis manufacturer in Institute kills two people and sends more than 30 people to the hospital.
- July 21 – Heavy rain causes flash floods in northern West Virginia.
- July 22 – State Delegate David Elliott Pritt (R-Oak Hill) is arrested and charged with sex assault, with federal investigators saying he enticed a teenage student at the school where he was employed as a teacher.
- November 3: 2026 West Virginia elections:
  - 2026 West Virginia House of Delegates election
  - 2026 West Virginia Senate election
  - 2026 United States House of Representatives elections in West Virginia
  - 2026 United States Senate election in West Virginia: Shelley Moore Capito wins reelection.

== See also ==
- 2026 in the United States
