= Senator Phelps (disambiguation) =

Samuel S. Phelps (1793–1855) was a U.S. Senator from Vermont from 1839 to 1851, and from 1853 to 1854. Senator Phelps may also refer to:

- Charles Phelps (politician) (1852–1940), Connecticut State Senate
- Charles A. Phelps (1820–1902), Massachusetts State Senate
- James Phelps (congressman) (1822–1900), Connecticut State Senate
- John M. Phelps (1821–1884), West Virginia State Senate
- Phelps Phelps (1897–1981), New York State Senate
- Timothy Guy Phelps (1824–1899), California State Senate
