= Oakland (Parkersburg, West Virginia) =

Historic house in West Virginia, United States

- U.S. National Register of Historic Places
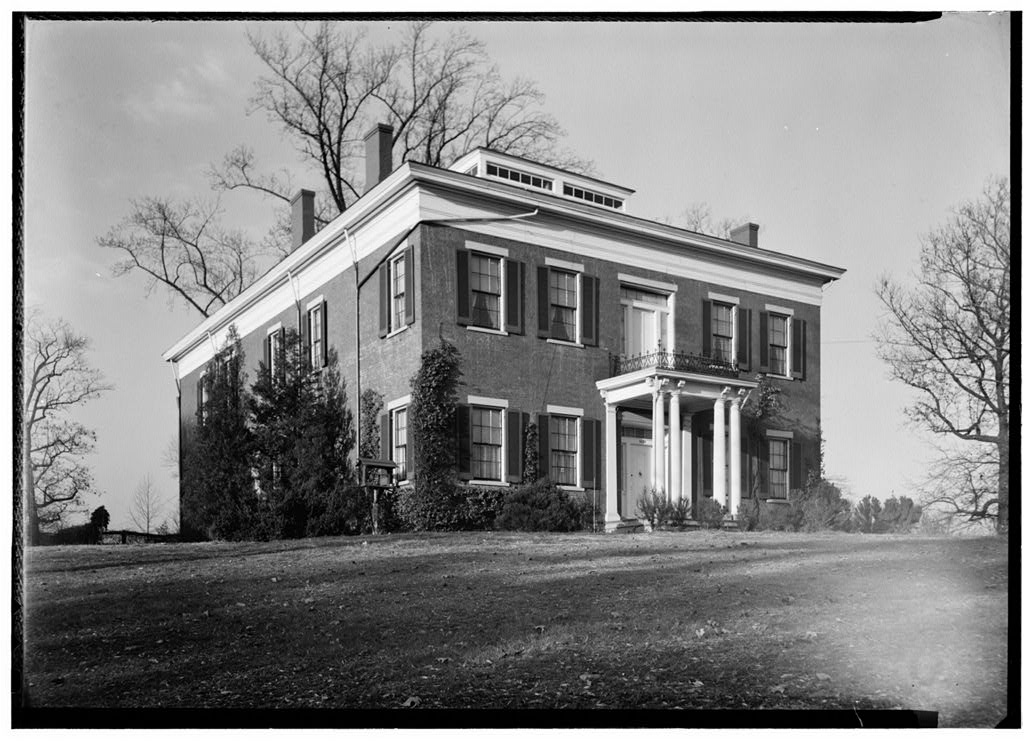
- Front and side of the house

- Location within West Virginia Location within the United States
- Location: 1131 7th St., Parkersburg, West Virginia
- Coordinates: 39°15′52″N 81°32′36″W
- Area: 6 acres (2.4 ha)
- Built: c. 1840
- Architectural style: Greek Revival
- NRHP reference No.: 79002604
- Added to NRHP: May 29, 1979

"Oakland," also known as the James M. Stephenson House, is a home located in Parkersburg, Wood County, West Virginia. Although a slaveholder and sympathizing with the Confederacy, Stephenson was also married to the sister of Unionist Arthur Boreman, and allowed then Union Army Col. (later Gen.) James B. Steedman to use his grove nearby during the American Civil War. However, Union cavalry units occupied this his mansion for a time nonetheless, and damaged furnishings as well as the home and garden.

It was built in 1840, and is a two-story, L-shaped, red brick house in the Greek Revival style. It features a low hipped roof with cupola and a single bay, one-story portico with paired, fluted wooden Doric order columns. It was listed on the National Register of Historic Places in 1979. It was donated to the WVU Parkersburg Foundation in 2015.

== See also ==
- National Register of Historic Places listings in Wood County, West Virginia
