= 2025 in West Virginia =

- Decades: 2000s; 2010s; 2020s
- See also: History of West Virginia; Historical outline of West Virginia; List of years in West Virginia; 2025 in the United States

The following is a list of events of the year 2025 in West Virginia.

== Incumbents ==
=== State government ===
- Governor:
  - Jim Justice (R) (until January 13)
  - Patrick Morrisey (R) (since January 13)

== Events ==
- January 5 – West Virginia is affected by the January 5–6, 2025 United States blizzard.
- June 14 – Nine people are killed in flash floods in northern West Virginia, with heavy floods hitting Wheeling, Triadelphia, and Valley Grove.
- June 27 - West Virginia Supreme Court of Appeals Justice Beth Walker retires. Served from 2017 to 2025 and was Chief Justice in 2019 and 2023.
- July 9 – Two former correctional officers, Mark Holdren and Johnathan Walters, are sentenced to 20 and 21 respective years in prison for their involvement in the 2022 beating death of inmate Quantez Burks at the Southern Regional Jail in Beaver.
- August 16 – Governor Morrisey directs the West Virginia National Guard to deploy 300-400 troops to Washington, D.C. to support the federal takeover of law enforcement in the capital.
- November 8 – A coal mining accident in Drennen traps a miner in a flooded cave. His body is recovered on November 13.
- December 29 – The state was granted $199 million for 2026 from the federal Rural Health Transformation Fund, administered by the Centers for Medicare & Medicaid Services.

== Deaths ==
- January 4 – Frank Blackwell, 77, politician, member of the West Virginia House of Delegates (1976–1982, 2016).
- January 14 – Thomas McHugh, 88, jurist, justice of the Supreme Court of Appeals of West Virginia (1981–1997, 2009–2013).
- January 20 – Michael Angelucci, 42, politician, member of the West Virginia House of Delegates (2018–2020).
- June 10 — Doug Skaff, 48, politician, former West Virginia House of Delegates minority leader (2020-2023), candidate for West Virginia Secretary of State in 2024
- August 26- Tim Armstead, 60, politician, Justice, West Virginia Supreme Court of Appeals (2018-2025), former West Virginia House of Delegates Speaker of the House, (2015-2018)

== See also ==
- 2025 in the United States
