= Sarah Stevenson (disambiguation) =

Sarah Stevenson (born 1983) is a British taekwondo athlete.

Sarah Stevenson may also refer to:

- Sarah Clotworthy Stevenson (1824–1885), First Lady of West Virginia from 1869 to 1871
- Sarah Hackett Stevenson (1841–1909), American physician

== See also ==
- Sara Yorke Stevenson (1847–1921), American archaeologist
- Sarah Stevens (disambiguation)
