= Benjamin H. Smith =

American politician

- Born: October 31, 1797; Rockingham County, Virginia, U.S.
- Died: 1887 (aged 89–90); Charlestown, West Virginia, U.S.
- Education: Ohio University
- Occupation: Lawyer
- Title: Delegate, state Senator

Benjamin H. Smith (October 31, 1797 – December 10, 1887) was a nineteenth-century American politician from Virginia. A U.S. District Attorney for both Whig President Millard Fillmore and Republican Abraham Lincoln, Smith also participated in Constitutional Conventions for both Virginia (1850) and West Virginia (1865).

== Early life ==
Smith was born in Rockingham County, Virginia in 1797. His family migrated to Ohio in 1810, and he graduated from Ohio University in 1819.

== Career ==
The Virginia Capitol at Richmond VA where 19th century Conventions met

As an adult, Smith settled in Kanawha County, Virginia and began a law practice.

Smith served in the Virginia state Senate from Kanawha County in the sessions of 1833/34, 1834/35, 1835/36, 1836/37 and in the January portions of 1838 and 1839. While a state Senator, Smith received a Master of Arts from the Ohio University.

Appointed U.S. District Attorney for the Western District of Virginia in 1849, because of his Whig affiliation, he was removed during the Presidency of Franklin Pierce, 1853-1857.

In 1850, Smith was elected to the Virginia Constitutional Convention of 1850. He was one of four delegates elected from the transmontane delegate district made up of his home district of Kanawha County as well as Greenbrier, Pocahontas, Fayette, Raleigh, and Nicholas Counties.

Smith was elected to the Virginia House of Delegates from Kanawha County for the session 1855/56.

During the American Civil War in 1863, President Abraham Lincoln reappointed Smith as U.S. District Attorney for the Western District of Virginia encompassing much of what was to become West Virginia; Smith served in that position until 1865.

Smith was a member of the West Virginia Convention of 1865. He was a Democratic candidate for Governor of West Virginia in 1866, and a member of the West Virginia legislature for one term.

== Death ==
Benjamin H. Smith died in Charlestown, West Virginia on December 10, 1887.

== Bibliography ==
- Pulliam, David Loyd (1901). The Constitutional Conventions of Virginia from the foundation of the Commonwealth to the present time. John T. West, Richmond. ISBN 978-1-2879-2059-5.
- Swem, Earl Greg (1918). A Register of the General Assembly of Virginia, 1776-1918, and of the Constitutional Conventions. David Bottom, Superintendent of Public Printing. ISBN 978-1-3714-6242-0.

Party political offices
First	Democratic nominee for Governor of West Virginia; 1866	Succeeded by Johnson N. Camden
