= 1868 West Virginia gubernatorial election =

- October 22, 1868
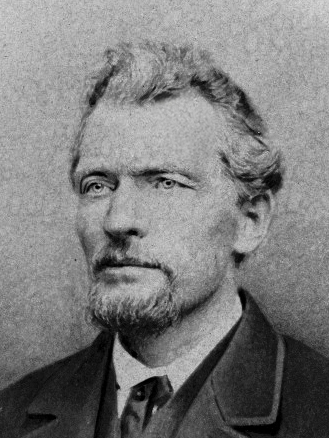

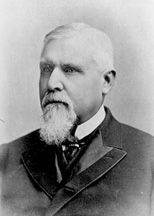
Nominee	William E. Stevenson	Johnson N. Camden
Party	Republican	Democratic
Popular vote	26,935	22,358
Percentage	54.64%	45.36%
- County results Stevenson: 50–60% 60–70% 70–80% >90% Camden: 50–60% 60–70% 70–80% 80–90%
Governor before election
Arthur I. Boreman
Republican
Elected Governor
William E. Stevenson
Republican

The 1868 West Virginia gubernatorial election took place on October 22, 1868, to elect the governor of West Virginia.

== Results ==
West Virginia gubernatorial election, 1868
Party	Candidate	Votes	%
Republican	William E. Stevenson	26,935	54.64
Democratic	Johnson N. Camden	22,358	45.36
Total votes		49,293	100
Republican hold			
