= 2023 in West Virginia =

- Decades: 2000s; 2010s; 2020s
- See also: History of West Virginia; Historical outline of West Virginia; List of years in West Virginia; 2023 in the United States

The following is a list of events of the year 2023 in West Virginia.

== Incumbents ==
=== State government ===
- Governor: Jim Justice (R)

== Events ==
- July 20 – The West Virginia United Students' Union is established.
- August 31 – Alderson Broaddus University suspends operations after 152 years.

== See also ==
- 2023 in the United States
