= 2024 in West Virginia =

- Decades: 2000s; 2010s; 2020s
- See also: History of West Virginia; Historical outline of West Virginia; List of years in West Virginia; 2024 in the United States

The following is a list of events of the year 2024 in West Virginia.

== Incumbents ==
=== State government ===
- Governor: Jim Justice (R)

== Events ==
- May 14 –
  - 2024 West Virginia Democratic presidential primary.
  - 2024 West Virginia Republican presidential primary
- September 27 – Hurricane Helene causes heavy rainfall across the state, with flooding affecting areas in Fayette and Mercer Counties.
- November 5 – 2024 United States presidential election in West Virginia

== See also ==
- 2024 in the United States
