= 1864 West Virginia gubernatorial election =

- October 27, 1864
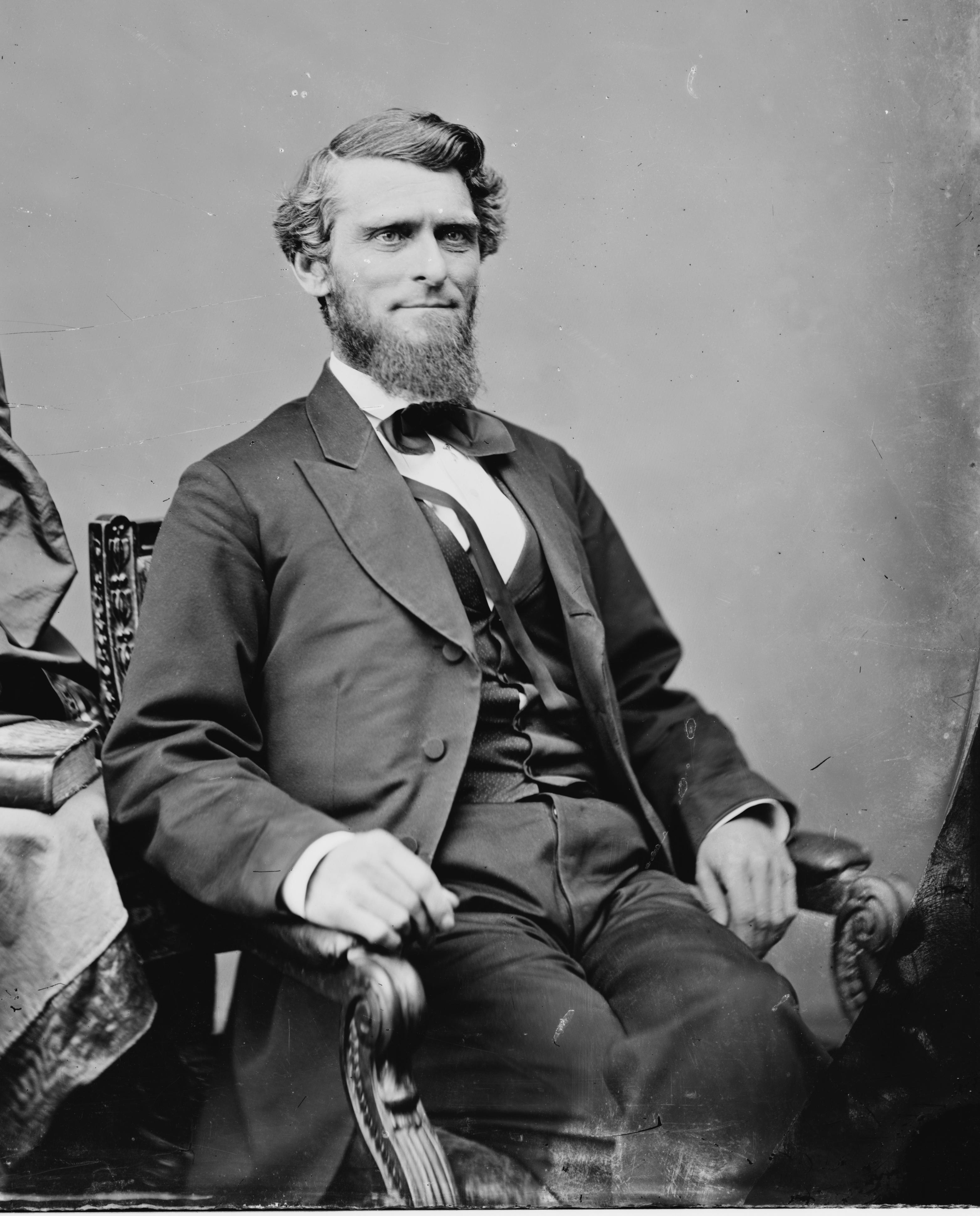
| Nominee | Arthur I. Boreman |
| Party | National Union |
| Popular vote | 19,353 |
| Percentage | 100.00% |
- County results Boreman: 90–100%
Governor before election
Arthur I. Boreman
National Union
Elected Governor
Arthur I. Boreman
National Union

The 1864 West Virginia gubernatorial election took place on October 27, 1864, to elect the governor of West Virginia.

== Results ==
West Virginia gubernatorial election, 1864
| Party | Candidate | Votes | % |
|---|---|---|---|
| National Union | Arthur I. Boreman (incumbent) | 19,353 | 100.00 |
| Total votes | | 19,353 | 100 |
| National Union hold | | | |
