= William E. Stevenson =

American politician (1820–1883)

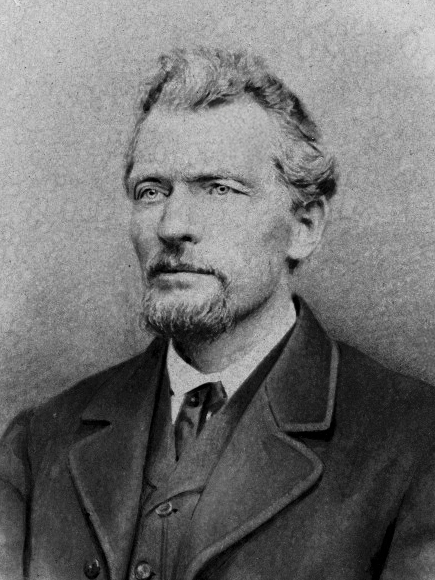

3rd Governor of West Virginia
- In office March 4, 1869 – March 4, 1871
- Preceded by: Daniel D. T. Farnsworth
- Succeeded by: John J. Jacob

President of the West Virginia Senate
- In office 1864–1869
- Governor: Arthur I. Boreman; Daniel D. T. Farnsworth
- Preceded by: John M. Phelps
- Succeeded by: Daniel D. T. Farnsworth

Personal details
- Born: William Erskine Stevenson; March 18, 1820 Warren, Pennsylvania, U.S.
- Died: November 29, 1883 (aged 63) Parkersburg, West Virginia, U.S.
- Party: Republican
- Spouse: Sarah Clotworthy Stevenson
- Profession: Politician

William Erskine Stevenson (March 18, 1820 – November 29, 1883) was an American cabinet-maker, farmer, and Republican politician from Parkersburg, West Virginia. He was the third governor of West Virginia from 1869 until 1871.

== Early and family life ==
William was the son of Irish immigrants, and was born in Warren, Pennsylvania. His parents, James and Elizabeth (Erskine) Stevenson, had immigrated to America in 1817. In 1829 James moved his young family to Pittsburgh to work as a cabinet-maker. William apprenticed at his father's trade, then went into business for himself. In September 1842 he married Sarah Clotworthy, another second generation American whose parents came from Belfast, Ireland.

== Career ==
Largely self-educated, Stevenson began his interest in politics as a labor spokesman. He was associated with the Pittsburgh unit of the National Reform Association, and advocated the ten-hour workday. He became an adherent of the new Republican Party, and shared in their early success by being elected to the Pennsylvania House of Representatives in 1857. However, later that same year he bought a small farm and moved to Wood County in western Virginia.

Stevenson remained an advocate of labor and also supported continuing the union. As the American Civil War grew closer, a warrant was issued for his arrest in 1859. He was accused of sedition against the state for circulating a book, The Impending Crisis of the South by Hinton Rowan Helper, that criticized slavery. Hoping to make a case for the freedom of ideas, Stevenson attempted to surrender to the Wood County sheriff, who declined to arrest him. But, from this point forward, he became a militant anti-slavery and pro-union activist.

In 1860 Stevenson was a delegate to the Republican national convention in Chicago. At home, he campaigned for Abraham Lincoln. When war finally came, Stevenson became an outspoken advocate to the creation of the state of West Virginia. He was a delegate for Wood County in the constitutional conventions of 1862 and 1863. When the second of these successfully withdrew from Virginia and statehood was achieved, he was elected to the West Virginia State Senate.

Stevenson served in the state senate from 1863 until 1868, and during the last three years became its president. That year he was elected on the Republican ticket as Governor of West Virginia. He served as governor for two years, but lost his bid for reelection in 1870. After the bulk of his political career, he became a partner in the Parkersburg State Journal and a director of the West Virginia Oil Land Company.

Stevenson had two more major political tasks, he served as a Presidential Elector in 1872 as he had in 1864.

== Death and legacy ==
Stevenson died at his home on Juliana Street in Parkersburg, West Virginia, and is buried in the Riverview Cemetery there.

Party political offices
Preceded by Arthur I. Boreman	Republican nominee for Governor of West Virginia; 1868, 1870	Succeeded by John J. Jacob; Endorsed
Political offices
Preceded by John M. Phelps	President of the WV Senate; 1864–1869	Succeeded by Daniel D. T. Farnsworth
Preceded by Daniel D. T. Farnsworth	Governor of West Virginia; 1869–1871	Succeeded by John J. Jacob
