= Boreman Hall =

Residence hall on West Virginia University campus

Coordinates: 39°37′59″N 79°57′10″W

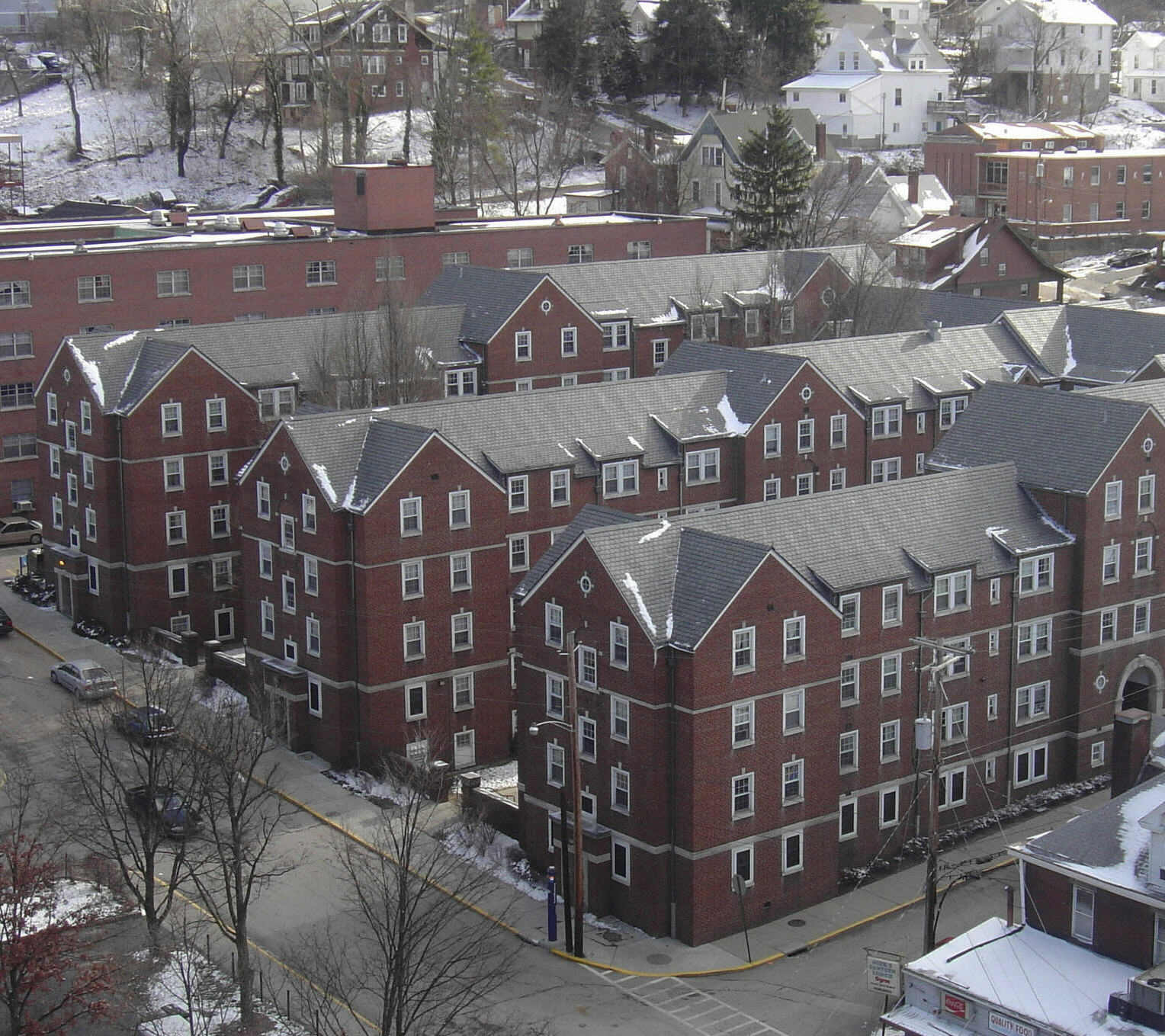
Boreman Hall

Boreman Hall is a residence hall on the campus of West Virginia University in Morgantown, West Virginia. Originally called Men's Hall when it was constructed in 1935, the hall is named after Arthur I. Boreman, the first governor of the state of West Virginia.

With the addition of a new annex building in 1963, Boreman Hall is now actually two separate buildings. Boreman Hall North, the newer of the two, is currently an all female dorm, the only single sex residence hall on the campus. Boreman Hall South, the older E-shaped building, is coed and includes 10 entrances. These entrances are connected to the others by way of bathrooms and ground floor lounges.

Construction on the original building started in 1934 and opened in time for the 1935 school year. With its opening, the university finally had a place for its men to live on campus. Before the hall was completed, men had to either live in fraternity houses, boarding houses, or with a local Morgantown family.

Funding for the building came in part from the federal Public Works Administration which was a New Deal agency set up during the Great Depression of the 1930s. The PWA supplied a loan of $446,080 and a grant of $179,876 for the project, whose total cost was $632,996. The building cost $625,000 at the time which is roughly equal to about $8.5 million in 2003 US Dollars.

During World War II, the hall was used as an Army Air Force barracks. Prominent dents in the doors of Boreman hall could still be seen as recently as 2024, remnants of Drill Instructors striking to doors sharply with rifle butts in order to awaken soldiers/airmen at early hours, especially new recruits. Directly across from the hall, where the current Student Union stands, there was a parade field and an armory that were used as training grounds. Residents of the hall were transported to the Morgantown airport, where they were trained by the US Air Force.

Since the end of the war, the hall has been used strictly as a residence hall and continues to be used as such today. It has been renovated and remodeled over the years, but it has remained one of the main cornerstones of the West Virginia University community and has often been the building where new programs that have moved campus-wide have been instituted.

The hall is listed on the National Register of Historic Places.
