= Cyrus M. Hawley =

American judge (1815–1894)

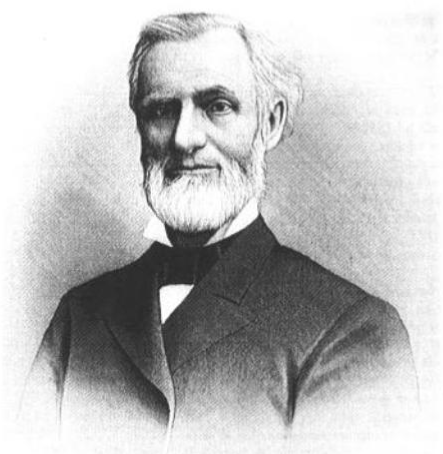

Justice of the Utah Territorial Supreme Court
- In office 1869–1873

Personal details
- Born: Cyrus Madison Hawley; January 1815 Solon, New York
- Died: August 29, 1894 (aged 79) Chicago, Illinois
- Spouses: Sophia Fellows (m. 1862) Annie Fulton Loomis (m. 1893)
- Children: 2
- Education: Read law
- Occupation: Jurist

Cyrus Madison Hawley (January 15 or 27, 1815 – August 29, 1894) was a justice of the Utah Territorial Supreme Court from 1869 to 1873.

== Early life, education, and career ==
Born in Solon, Cortland County, New York, to Lewis Hawley and Sarah Tanner Hawley, he was educated in Homer, New York, and read law under Joshua A. Spencer, in Utica, New York. Hawley moved to Chicago in 1847, and continued reading law to be admitted to the bar there in 1849. He thereafter practiced in Chicago for twenty years, including in that time a period of association with Lyman Trumbull, and George Trumbull. In 1861, he gained national prominence for publishing a letter advocating for the United States Department of the Treasury to issue treasury notes. At the time, the United States had no federal currency, instead relying on states and private banks to issue their own currency. In 1862, Hawley was admitted to practice before the Supreme Court of the United States.

== Judicial service ==
On April 15, 1869, Hawley was appointed by President Ulysses S. Grant to the Territorial Utah Supreme Court, holding that office for four years. It was said that "his written decisions and opinions upon the various legal issues which were submitted to his consideration are noted for their soundness, ability and perspicuity". While serving in this capacity, he ordered the arrest of John D. Lee for Lee's role in the Mountain Meadows massacre.

== Later life and death ==
Hawley later moved to Washington, D.C., where he partnered with Albert G. Riddle for a time. He returned to Chicago in his retirement, residing in Hyde Park, where he died after a year-long illness. In death, Hawley made one final contribution to the law: he had been sued by one Marie M. Fenton in Illinois on the grounds that workers contracted to Hawley had damaged Fenton's property, but both Fenton and Hawley died while the lawsuit was progressing. The court held that the lawsuit survived both, and that Fenton's estate could collect from Hawley's estate due to Hawley's liability for the damage.

== Personal life ==
In 1862 Hawley married Sophia Fellows, granddaughter of American Revolution General John Fellows. Many years after Sophia's death, on January 19, 1893, Hawley married Annie Fulton Loomis of Chicago, who survived him.

Political offices
Preceded by Thomas J. Drake	Justice of the Utah Supreme Court; 1869–1873	Succeeded by Jacob S. Boreman
