= Sarah Stevens =

Sarah Stevens, Sara Stevens, or Sarah Stephens may refer to:

- Sarah Stevens (politician) (born 1960), American politician from North Carolina
- Sara Stevens (born 1974), American politician from Maine
- Sarah Stephens (born 1990), Australian model
- Sarah Stevens (shot putter), winner of the 2007 shot put at the NCAA Division I Indoor Track and Field Championships

== See also ==
- Sarah Stevenson (disambiguation)
