= 1866 West Virginia gubernatorial election =

- October 25, 1866
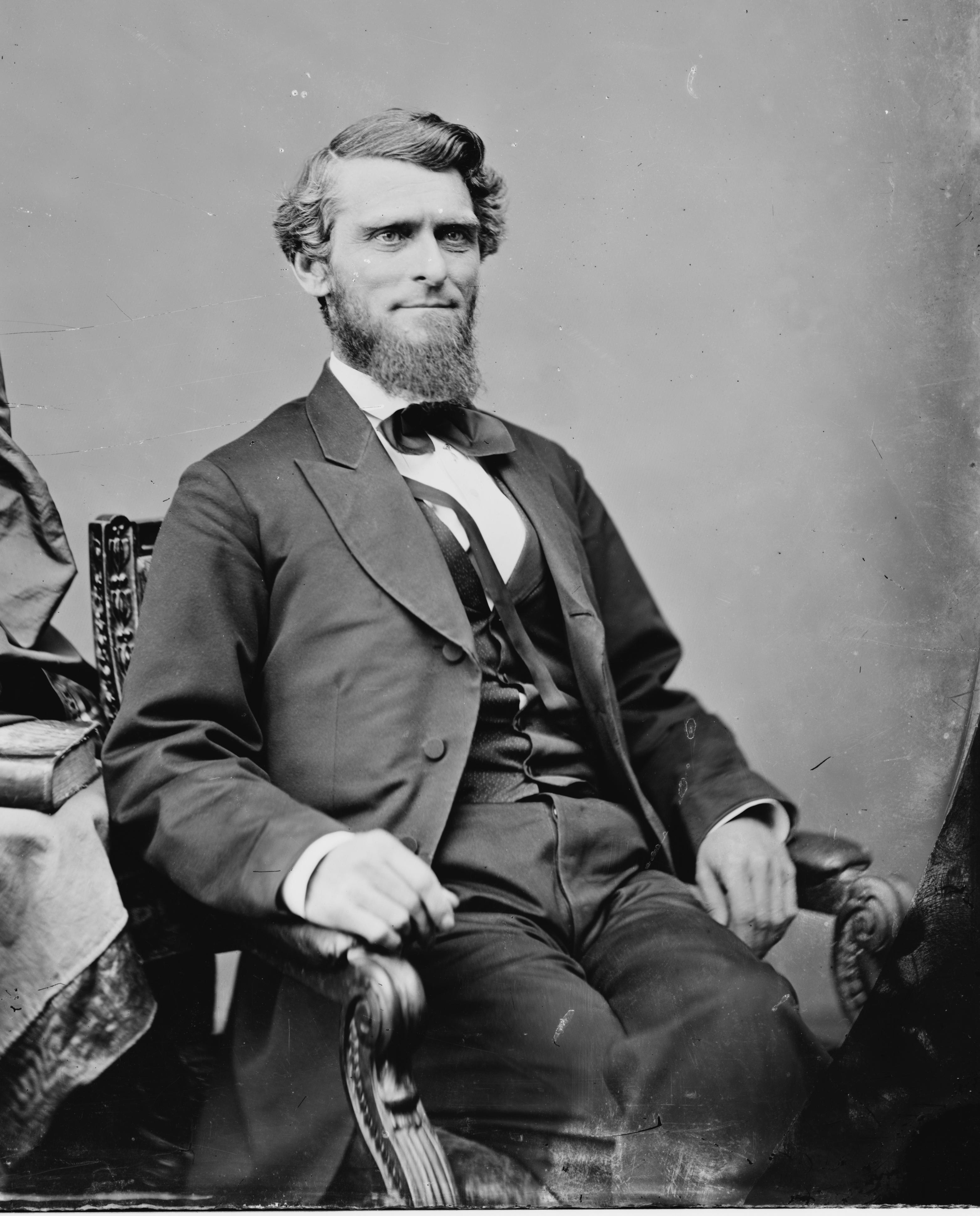

Nominee	Arthur I. Boreman	Benjamin H. Smith
Party	Republican	Democratic
Popular vote	23,802	17,158
Percentage	58.11%	41.89%
- County results Boreman: 50–60% 60–70% 70–80% 80–90% >90% Smith: 50–60% 60–70% 70–80% >90%
Governor before election
Arthur I. Boreman
Republican
Elected Governor
Arthur I. Boreman
Republican

The 1866 West Virginia gubernatorial election took place on October 25, 1866, to elect the governor of West Virginia.

== Results ==
West Virginia gubernatorial election, 1866
Party	Candidate	Votes	%
Republican	Arthur I. Boreman (incumbent)	23,802	58.11
Democratic	Benjamin H. Smith	17,158	41.89
Total votes		40,960	100
Republican hold			
