= Daniel D. T. Farnsworth =

American politician (1819–1892)

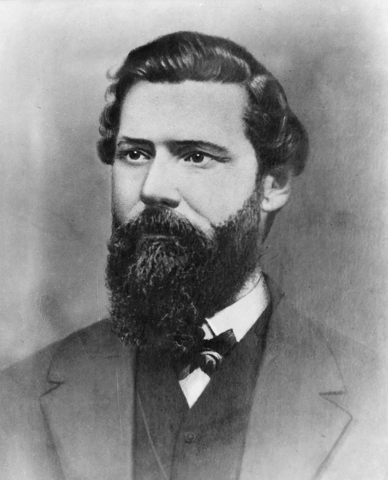

President of the West Virginia Senate
- In office 1869–1871
- Governor: William E. Stevenson
- Preceded by: William E. Stevenson
- Succeeded by: Lewis Baker

2nd Governor of West Virginia
- In office February 26, 1869 – March 4, 1869
- Preceded by: Arthur I. Boreman
- Succeeded by: William E. Stevenson

Personal details
- Born: Daniel Duane Tompkins Farnsworth; December 23, 1819 Staten Island, New York, U.S.
- Died: December 5, 1892 (aged 72) Buckhannon, West Virginia, U.S.
- Party: Republican
- Spouse: Mary Ireland Farnsworth
- Profession: Politician

Daniel Duane Tompkins Farnsworth (December 23, 1819 – December 5, 1892) was an American politician in the U.S. state of West Virginia, who served in the West Virginia Senate and briefly as the second governor of West Virginia from February to March 1869.

== Biography ==
Farnsworth was born in Staten Island, New York. When he was two his family moved to Buckhannon, West Virginia in Upshur County. He married Mary Ireland. Farnsworth was the President of the West Virginia Senate in 1869 when Governor Arthur I. Boreman resigned his office to serve in the United States Senate. Farnsworth was Governor of West Virginia for seven days, from February 26, 1869 - March 4, 1869.

Before becoming governor, Farnsworth participated in the Wheeling conventions associated with the formation of West Virginia and served in the state senates of the Reorganized Government of Virginia and West Virginia between 1862 and 1870. He also helped revise the state's legal code in 1868. After his brief tenure as governor, he returned to the state Senate and later participated in the 1872 West Virginia Constitutional Convention. During the 1870s, he became active in the Greenback Party. He died in Buckhannon on December 5, 1892.

Political offices
| Preceded by Arthur I. Boreman | Governor of West Virginia; 1869 | Succeeded by William E. Stevenson |
| Preceded by William E. Stevenson | President of the WV Senate; 1869–1871 | Succeeded by Lewis Baker |
