= Sarah Clotworthy Stevenson =

First Lady of West Virginia (1824–1885)

- Born: 1824; Philadelphia, Pennsylvania, U.S.
- Died: 1885 (aged 60–61); Parkersburg, West Virginia
- Known for: First lady of West Virginia, 1869–1871

Sarah Clotworthy Stevenson (1824–1885) was the wife of former Governor of West Virginia, William E. Stevenson. She held the role of First Lady of the state from 1869 to 1871.

== Biography ==
She was born in 1824 in Philadelphia, Pennsylvania. In 1842, she married William E. Stevenson. In the 1850s, the Stevensons relocated from Pittsburgh, Pennsylvania to Parkersburg, West Virginia, where Mr. Stevenson became a strong advocate for the Union and West Virginia statehood.

During her husband's term as governor, in 1870, the state capital was moved from Wheeling to Charleston. After William E. Stevenson's tenure ended, the Stevensons returned to Parkersburg, West Virginia.

== Death ==
She died at Parkersburg in 1885.

Honorary titles
Preceded by Mary Ireland Farnsworth	First Lady of West Virginia; 1869 – 1871	Succeeded by Jane Baird Jacob
