= 2028 West Virginia gubernatorial election =

- November 7, 2028
Party	Republican	Democratic
Incumbent Governor
Patrick Morrisey
Republican

The 2028 West Virginia gubernatorial election will be held on November 7, 2028, to elect the governor of West Virginia, concurrently with the 2028 U.S. presidential election. One-term Republican incumbent Patrick Morrisey has not yet declared his intentions on whether or not he will run for re-election.

== Republican primary ==
=== Candidates ===
==== Expressed interest ====
- Jim Justice, junior U.S. Senator (2025–present) and former governor (2017–2025)

==== Potential ====
- Patrick Morrisey, incumbent governor since 2025
- Larry Pack, 26th Treasurer of West Virginia (2025–present) (will not run if Justice does)
- Kris Warner, 31st Secretary of State of West Virginia (2025–present)

=== Hypothetical polling ===
Poll source	Date(s) administered	Sample size (Note: Key: A – all adults RV – registered voters LV – likely voters V – unclear)	Margin of error	Jim Justice	Patrick Morrisey	Larry Pack	Kris Warner	Other	Undecided
WMOV/American Pulse	November 12–18, 2026	—		43%	28%	—	—	9%	20%
WMOV/American Pulse	November 12–18, 2026	—		—	32%	10%	18%	10%	31%
WMOV/American Pulse	November 12–18, 2026	—		—	38%	17%	—	12%	33%

== Independent candidates ==
=== Potential ===
- Joe Manchin, former U.S. Senator (2010–2025) and former governor (2005–2010)

== General election ==
=== Hypothetical polling ===
Patrick Morrisey vs. Joe Manchin

Poll source	Date(s) administered	Sample size	Margin of error	Patrick Morrisey (R)	Joe Manchin (I)	Undecided
WMOV/American Pulse	November 12–18, 2026	708 (RV)	± 3.7%	22%	47%	31% (Note: "Other" with 15%)

Patrick Morrisey vs. Amy Goodwin

Poll source	Date(s) administered	Sample size	Margin of error	Patrick Morrisey (R)	Amy Goodwin (D)	Undecided
WMOV/American Pulse	November 12–18, 2026	708 (RV)	± 3.7%	40%	31%	29% (Note: "Other" with 10%)
