= James McNeil Stephenson =

American politician

James M. Stephenson
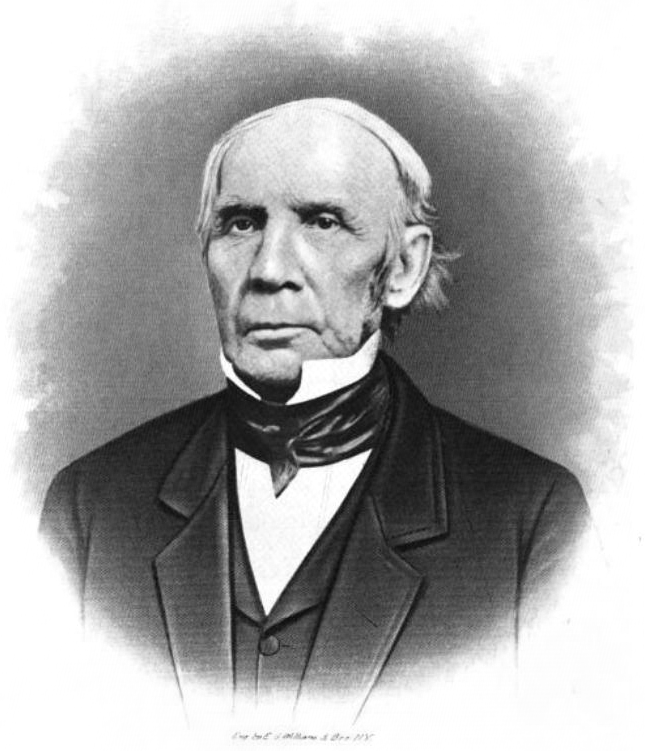

Member of the Virginia House of Delegates from the Wood, Ritchie and Doddridge Counties district
- In office December 7, 1846 – December 3, 1848
- Preceded by: Daniel R. Neal
- Succeeded by: Henry B. Collins

Member of the Virginia House of Delegates from the Tyler County district
- In office December 4, 1843 – November 30, 1845
- Preceded by: James G. West
- Succeeded by: James G. West

Member of the Virginia House of Delegates from the Tyler County district
- In office January 7, 1839 – December 5, 1841
- Preceded by: John Ripley
- Succeeded by: Presley Martin

Personal details
- Born: November 4, 1796 Greene County, Pennsylvania, US
- Died: April 16, 1877 (aged 80) Parkersburg, West Virginia, US
- Spouse: Agnes Boreman Stephenson
- Profession: Politician, sawyer

James McNeil Stephenson (November 4, 1796 – April 16, 1877) was an American lawyer, businessman and politician who served several terms in the Virginia House of Delegates representing western Virginia counties which in his lifetime became part of the state of West Virginia. His is probably not related to James Stephenson who represented western Virginia counties (now in the Eastern Panhandle of West Virginia) in the Virginia House of Delegates and U.S. Congress, nor schoolteacher Benjamin L. Stephenson (1826-1871) of Clay County, West Virginia who helped found the new state.

== Early and family life ==
Born in Greene County, Pennsylvania, Stephenson moved across the Ohio River when he was young. When his father died, he apprenticed with a tanner and began reading law. He married Agnes Boreman, the sister of his law partner as well as future governor Arthur I. Boreman (who would become one of the founders of West Virginia during the American Civil War).

== Career ==
In addition to his legal practice, Stephenson became politically active, particularly in promoting internal improvements, including the Staunton-Parkersburg Road, the Northwestern Turnpike, the James River and Kanawha Canal, the North Western Virginia Railroad and the Little Kanawha Navigation Company. Stephenson was elected to the Virginia House of Delegates many times beginning in 1839, although he also lost several races. He first represented Tyler County in 1839 and was re-elected the following year, then was again elected in 1843 and re-elected in 1844, but not in 1845 when Doddridge County was added to the district. In 1839, Stephenson helped found the Northwestern Bank of Virginia (which became Parkersburg Bank and is now part of United Bank) in Parkersburg (the seat of Wood County), where he soon moved. Thus he was elected to the Virginia House of Delegates for the final times from the district comprising Wood, Ritchie and Doddridge Counties.

Following Lincoln's election (despite having received only 4% of the vote in northwestern Virginia), on January 1, 1861 Stephenson addressed a large meeting in Parkersburg, as did General John Jay Jackson and Arthur Boreman, and that meeting adopted a resolution both pro-Union and pro-Virginia.

By 1860, Stephenson owned about 10,000 acres in Wood County, including about 1000 acres surrounding Oakland, the Greek Revival style mansion he built in 1840 and farmed using about 20 slaves. Union troops encamped on the grounds with Stephenson's permission during the American Civil War (after General John Jay Jackson told them to move off his property on Quincy Hill), although later Union cavalry damaged both this mansion and garden. Stephenson's eldest son, Kenner, enlisted as a private with the 36th Virginia Infantry on April 15, 1862, and this Stephenson also put up the $4000 cash bond for the wife of Confederate Captain Marcellus Clark, who was accused of being a horse thief (and who before the war had helped manage the California House in at Claysville).

== Death and legacy ==
Stephenson died in Parkersburg in 1877. His mansion, Oakland, was placed on the National Register of Historic Places in 1979 (although the surrounding estate shrunk significantly after Stephenson's death) and was donated to the WVU at Parkersburg Foundation in 2015.
