= Laurane Tanner Bullock Boreman =

- Born: November 24, 1830; Wheeling, West Virginia
- Died: April 14, 1908 (aged 77); Parkersburg, West Virginia
- Known for: First lady of West Virginia, 1869

Laurane Tanner Bullock Boreman (November 24, 1830 – April 14, 1908) was the wife of former Governor of West Virginia Arthur I. Boreman and served as that state's First Lady, 1869. She was born on May 1, 1830, at Wheeling, Virginia (now in West Virginia). Her first husband, John Oldham Bullock, was a Union soldier killed early in the Civil War. On November 30, 1864, she married Arthur I. Boreman. She helped define the role of the first lady, hosting formal gatherings at the Boreman's home in Wheeling. After leaving office, the Boremans moved to Washington, D.C. where Gov. Boremen served one term in the United States Senate and then to Parkersburg, West Virginia, where she died on April 14, 1908.

Honorary titles
Preceded by none	First Lady of West Virginia; 1864 – 1869	Succeeded by Mary Ireland Farnsworth
