= Julia-Ann Square Historic District =

Historic district in West Virginia, United States

- U.S. National Register of Historic Places
- U.S. Historic district
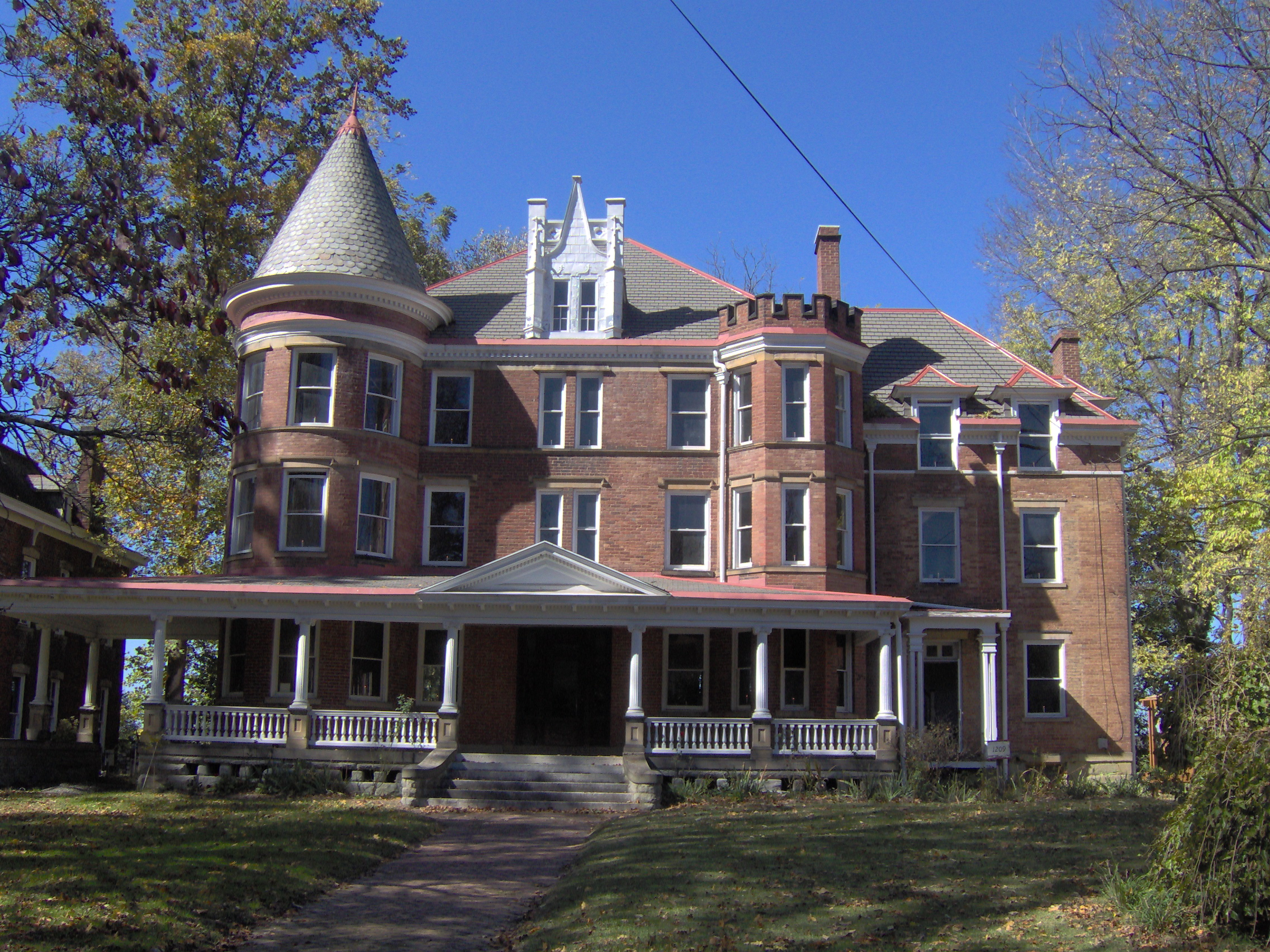
- Van Winkle-Wix House, October 2006

- Location within West Virginia Location within the United States
- Location: Both sides of Juliana and Ann Sts. from cemetery to 9th St., Parkersburg, West Virginia
- Coordinates: 39°16′16″N 81°33′21″W
- Area: 35 acres (14 ha)
- Built: 1875
- Architect: Multiple
- Architectural style: Colonial Revival, Late Victorian
- NRHP reference No.: 77001380
- Added to NRHP: May 24, 1977

The Julia-Ann Square Historic District, is a national historic district located at Parkersburg, Wood County, West Virginia. It is to the west of the Avery Street Historic District. It encompasses all houses on Ann and Juliana Streets from Riverview Cemetery to 9th Street. There are 116 contributing buildings and one contributing site. The majority of the houses were constructed between 1875 and 1915.

The district was added to the National Register of Historic Places in 1977, with architecture styles being listed as late Victorian architecture and Colonial Revival architecture. Many notable examples of Queen Anne architecture can be seen in the neighborhood as well.

Among the notable dwellings is the Van Winkle-Wix House. It was built in 1836 by Peter Van Winkle in what was at the time a portion of western Virginia. The building has undergone many changes since being initially constructed as a two-story residence, with most coming in the years 1875–1899. The third floor and the north wing as well as the turrets and spires were all added through the years. Additionally, the entrance, which originally faced Murdoch Avenue to the west, was reversed to face Ann St, as it currently does.

The Peter G. Van Winkle House at 600-602 Juliana Street was demolished in 1994.

== Gallery ==
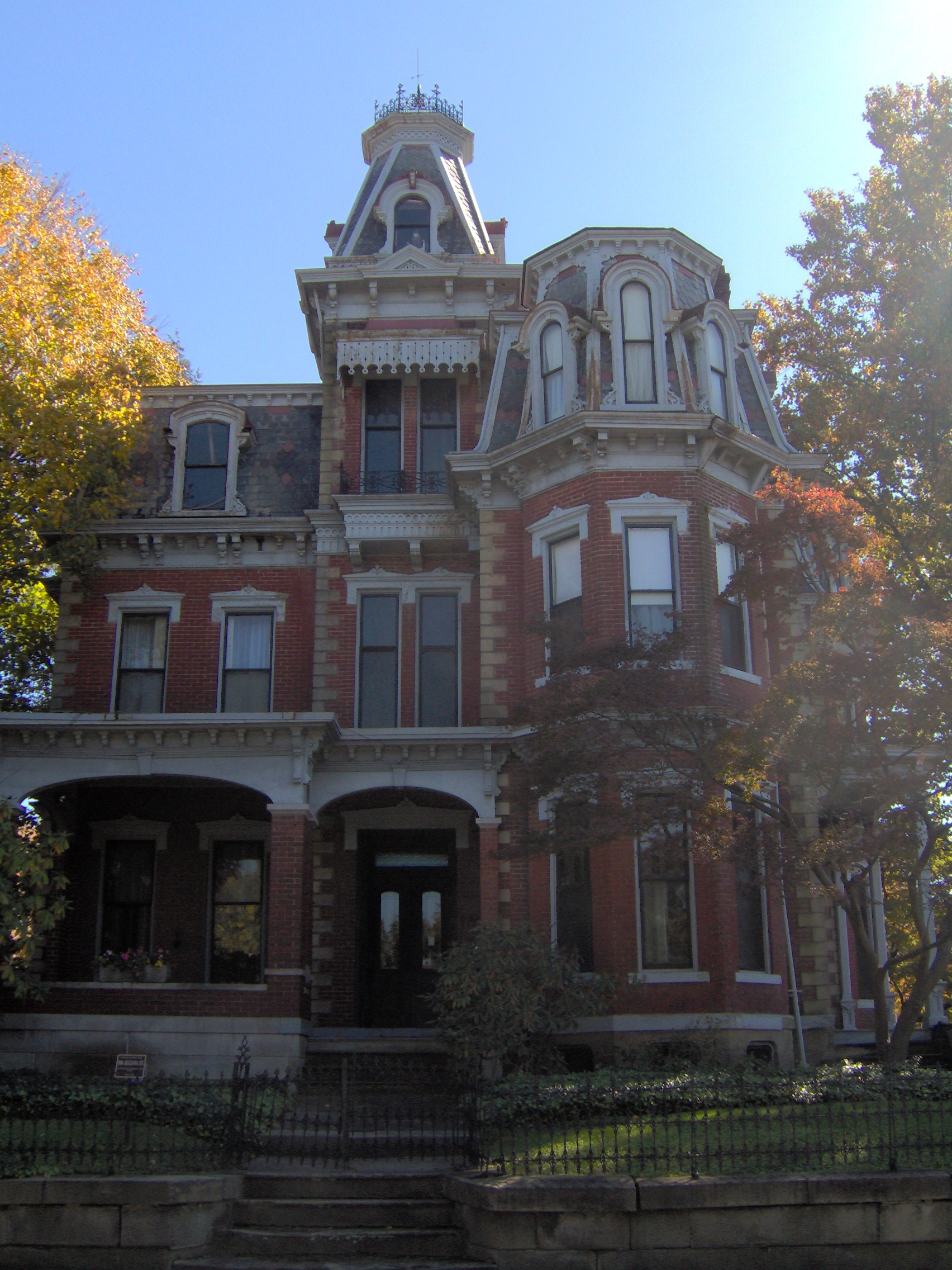
Chancellor House, October 2006

== See also ==
- National Register of Historic Places listings in Wood County, West Virginia
