= Peter G. Van Winkle House =

Historic house in West Virginia, United States

- U.S. National Register of Historic Places
- Location within West Virginia Location within the United States
- Location: 600 Juliana St., Parkersburg, West Virginia
- Coordinates: 39°16′2″N 81°33′34″W
- Area: less than one acre
- Built: 1880
- Architectural style: Queen Anne
- MPS: Downtown Parkersburg MRA
- NRHP reference No.: 82001792
- Added to NRHP: October 8, 1982

The Peter G. Van Winkle House was a historic home located in the Julia-Ann Square Historic District in Parkersburg, Wood County, West Virginia. It was built between about 1880 and 1899, and was a two-story duplex in the Queen Anne style. It featured a deck hipped roof with intersecting gables, turrets, and dormers. It was built on property once owned by former United States Senator Peter G. Van Winkle, who died in 1872.

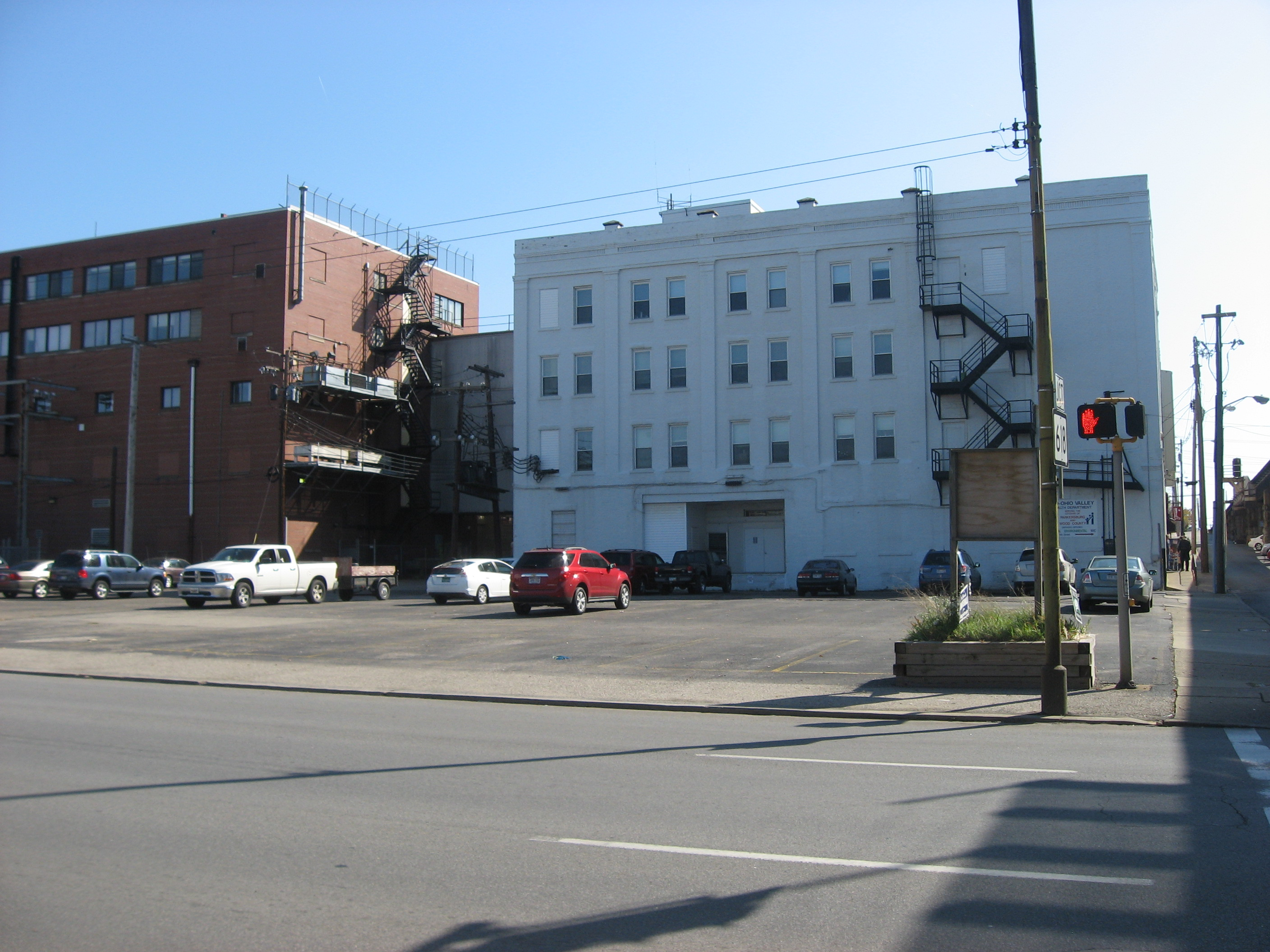
Former site of the house

It was listed on the National Register of Historic Places in 1982. It was demolished in 1994. The nearby Van Winkle-Wix House remains extant.

== See also ==
- National Register of Historic Places listings in Wood County, West Virginia
