= 2026 Institute, West Virginia chemical leak =

Industrial disaster in West Virginia

2026 Institute chemical leak
- Date: April 22, 2026
- Time: About 9:30 am (EST)
- Location: Institute, West Virginia, U.S.; 38.386°N 81.782°W
- Type: Chemical accident
- Deaths: 2
- Injuries: 4 seriously injured and about 30 treated or evaluated for injuries

On April 22, 2026, a chemical release of hydrogen sulfide occurred at the Catalyst Refiners, Inc. silver recovery plant, a subsidiary of Ames Goldsmith Corporation in Institute, West Virginia, killing 2 workers and seriously injuring 4 others, and about 30 people sought treatment or evaluation. A chemical reaction during the decommissioning of a tank created hydrogen sulfide. The United States Chemical Safety and Hazard Investigation Board (CSB) opened an investigation into the incident.

== Background ==
Institute is home to the historically-Black West Virginia State University and multiple chemical plants, which have had a number of chemical incidents in their history and has caused concern from environmental justice advocates.

A previous chemical explosion in Institute in 2008 killed 2 and injured 8.

Catalyst Refiners is a Subsidiary of Ames Goldsmith, which is headquartered in South Glens Falls, New York. the plant reclaimed silver from spent catalyst. It sits between Nitro and Institute, West Virginia some sources list the refinery between the two towns. By April 2026, production at the plant had stopped and the facility was being decommissioned ahead of a planned closure. The plant the disaster occurred at had a history of safety incidents, including two spills of nitric acid within a month in 2013, a federal workplace safety violation in 2018, and had released 1,310 pounds of nitric acid into the air from 2014 to 2024.

== Incident ==
At about 9:30 a.m., workers were disposing of chemicals that had been left at the facility ahead of its preplanned closure. As a part of the decommissioning, chemicals were being transferred into a wastewater receiving tank workers would pump about 80 gallons of A-50 a propriety calcium chloride solution and 275 gallons of M-2000A a sodium tri thiocarbonate solution used to recover silver mixed workers then mixed those chemicals with nitric acid. The workers saw a reaction and a fog form as the pump operator stopped the flow. The reaction released hydrogen sulfide gas. 2 workers were killed and four were seriously injured.

== Emergency Response ==
Emergency responders issued a shelter-in-place order covering one mile around the plant. The Kanawha County school district ordered a shelter-in-place for multiple schools in the area, as did West Virginia State University. They were later lifted. The CSB reported that 22 people were decontaminated and 18 were taken to medical facilities. Seven Kanawha County Emergency Ambulance Authority workers were among those treated.

== Investigation ==
In August 2026, the CSB released an update on its investigation. It found that the facility had no written procedure for disposing of these chemicals. Respirator use wasn't required once the production stopped as a part of the preplanned closure, and the facility did not provide or require personal gas monitors for workers. The investigation is ongoing. The CSB plans to examine chemical incompatibilities, hazard analysis during decommissions, disposal procedures, protective equipment, monitoring of the atmosphere, and possible corporate oversight.

== Aftermath ==
The United States Environmental Protection Agency (EPA) and the West Virginia Department of Environmental Protection (DEP) oversaw the cleanup at the site. Kanawha County Emergency Management and the Institute Volunteer Fire Department were also at the site for a day after the leak. The EPA deployed 11 air monitors around the facility and in the surrounding community, and they detected no hydrogen sulfide. Governor Patrick Morrisey said the DEP's Environmental enforcement teams were investigating the cause of the incident as well as the facility's regulation compliance. The plant stayed temporality closed during cleanup and investigations. Local officials said that the site was already in the process of shutting down before the incident. The leak happened during that shutdown work, while workers were disposing of leftover chemicals. In August 2026, after the CSB released its update to the incident, Ames Goldsmith said it would keep cooperating with investigators.

== See also ==
- Buffalo Creek flood
- Upper Big Branch Mine disaster
- Willow Island disaster
