= John M. Phelps =

American politician

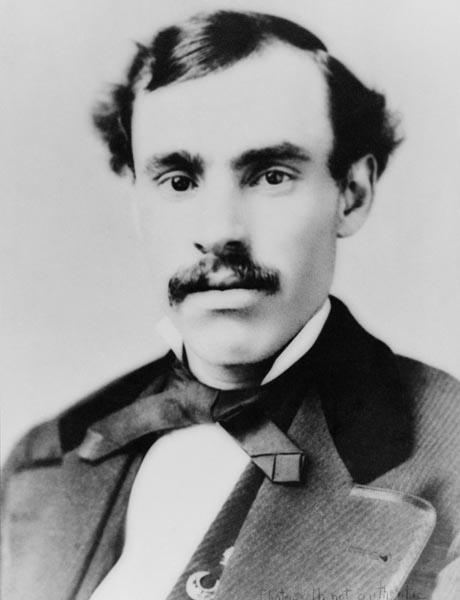
- John M. Phelps, first President of the West Virginia Senate

Member of the West Virginia Senate from Mason County

5th
- In office 1871–1873
- Preceded by: James M. Pipes
- Succeeded by: Charles Hedrick

West Virginia Secretary of State

Personal details
- Born: 1821
- Died: August 26, 1884 (aged 62–63) Point Pleasant, West Virginia, US
- Resting place: Lone Oak Cemetery, Point Pleasant
- Occupation: minister, politician

John M. Phelps (1821 – August 26, 1884) was a Methodist minister who became politically active in the Republican Party during the American Civil War, and became the first president of the West Virginia Senate (having been elected from Mason County). He later served (as a Democrat) as West Virginia's fifth secretary of state (1871–1873).

== Early and family life ==
By 1845, John Phelps was living in Gilmer County in the Kanawha River valley, having married Mary Loudin. They had three children (all born in what was then Virginia): Oliver (born 1845), Cordelia (born 1846), and William (born 1849). Mary died in February or March 1853 in Harrison County, West Virginia. After his first wife's death, Phelps married Susan Jane Hagerman at Malden, Kanawha County, West Virginia. By 1860, they had moved to the Point Pleasant area near the Ohio River. The 1860 federal census found them in West Liberty in Ohio County, whereas the state census placed them near the Letart post office. In any event, Phelps' children with Mary, were joined by Charles (born 1857), and Thomas (born 1859).

== American Civil War ==
After Virginia voted to secede from the Union in April, 1861 over the opposition of delegates from the state's northwestern corner (among other areas), men gathered in Wheeling to separate themselves from the rest of Virginia, also upset that many votes from their region in the succession election had not been counted. On May 13–15, 1861, John M. Phelps was one of Mason County's unofficial delegates to the First Wheeling Convention; the official delegates being veteran politicians Charles B. Waggoner (who served as one of the Convention's three secretaries beginning on May 13), Lewis Wetzel (who served at all sessions until his death in, and Daniel Polsey).

Phelps then raised an infantry company, and on February 28, 1862, mustered in as captain of Company "E" 9th West Virginia Infantry. After the unit reorganized on May 2, 1862, Rev. Phelps became the chaplain, and held the position for less than a year before resigning on March 18, 1863 "on account of business and family affairs." Meanwhile, his son Oliver also served in the unit, beginning as first lieutenant on March 5, 1862, and receiving a promotion to captain of B Company on February 1, 1864.

== Political career ==
Mason County voters had elected Rev. Phelps to represent them in the state Senate during the First, Second and Third West Virginia legislatures. As the first legislature convened in Wheeling on June 20, 1863, fellow state senators elected Rev. Phelps as their first president, which position he held until the session adjourned six months later on December 11. Thus Phelps served in the Senate from 1863 to 1865, when Rev. D.H.K. Dix of Winfield in Putnam County replaced him during the Fourth, Firth and Sixth legislatures. Rev. Phelps again won election to the Seventh and Eighth legislature, serving from 1869 to 1870, when he was replaced by William A. Alexander of Frazier's Bottom. On February 4, 1865, Phelps voted for the abolition of slavery in West Virginia. He was nominated by the Democratic Party for Secretary of State of West Virginia in 1870 and served from 1871 until 1873.

== Death and legacy ==
Phelps died August 26, 1884, at Point Pleasant, Mason County, West Virginia.

Political offices
Preceded by none	President of the WV Senate; 1863–1864	Succeeded by William E. Stevenson
Preceded by James M. Pipes	West Virginia Secretary of State; 1871—1873	Succeeded by Charles Hedrick
