= Peter G. Van Winkle =

American politician (1808–1872)

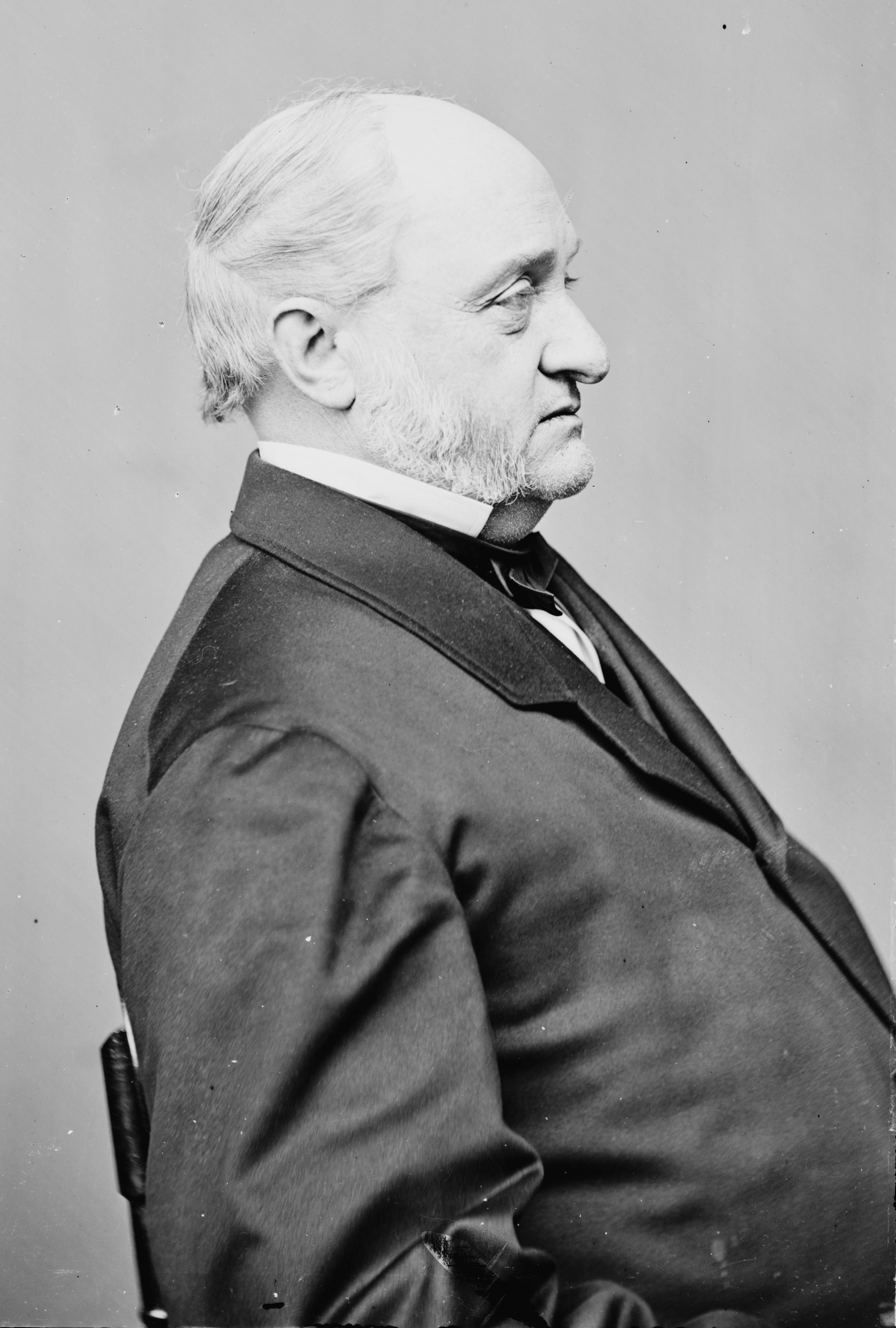

United States Senator from West Virginia
- In office August 4, 1863 – March 3, 1869
- Preceded by: office established
- Succeeded by: Arthur I. Boreman

Member of the West Virginia House of Delegates
- In office 1863

Personal details
- Born: September 7, 1808 New York City, US
- Died: April 15, 1872 (aged 63) Parkersburg, West Virginia, US
- Party: Union
- Other political affiliations: Republican
- Spouse: Julia Rathbone

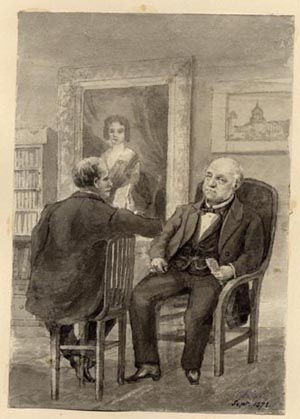
Sketch of Van Winkle by Joseph Diss Debar

Peter Godwin Van Winkle (September 7, 1808 – April 15, 1872) was an American lawyer, businessman, and politician. A prominent officer of the Northwestern Virginia Railroad for many years, he became one of the founders of West Virginia and later served as a United States senator.

== Early and family life ==
Van Winkle was born in New York City to an established family. After completing preparatory studies, he pursued law and was admitted to the bar. He married Juliet Rathbone, the eldest daughter of William Palmer Rathbone (1784–1862) and Martha Ming Valleau Rathbone (1793–1846), an influential family in western Virginia involved in developing the oil field at Burning Springs. By 1835, Van Winkle and his wife had moved to Parkersburg, Virginia (now West Virginia). The couple had three children who survived to adulthood.

== Career ==
Van Winkle deepened his legal expertise through further studies with lawyer and General John Jay Jackson Sr. He began practicing law in Parkersburg in 1835 and served as president of the town board of trustees from 1844 to 1850. During this time, Wood County voters elected him to represent the region at the Virginia's State constitutional convention in 1850.

In 1852, Van Winkle became treasurer and later president of the Northwestern Virginia Railroad Company, holding these roles through the American Civil War.

After Virginia seceded from the Union in 1861, Van Winkle aligned with the Unionist cause, reflecting the prevailing sentiment in northwestern Virginia. Wood County voters elected him to the second Wheeling Convention, where he played a crucial role in organizing the Restored Government of Virginia.

In 1862, he served as a delegate to the convention that drafted West Virginia's first constitution. He was also elected to the first session of the West Virginia House of Delegates in 1863.

Van Winkle served in the U.S. Senate from August 4, 1863, to March 3, 1869, representing West Virginia as a Unionist. He chaired the Committee on Pensions during the Fortieth Congress. He was one of 11 senators to vote against the Fourteenth Amendment to the United States Constitution.

One of the most significant moments of his Senate tenure occurred during Andrew Johnson's impeachment trial in 1868. Van Winkle broke party ranks, along with nine other Republican senators and voted for acquittal, defying their party and public opinion in voting against conviction (which failed by one vote). Seven of the dissenting senators, including Van Winkle, cited concerns over the fairness of the trial proceedings, which they believed had been manipulated to present one-sided evidence.

The other senators who voted against impeachment along with him were James Dixon, James Rood Doolittle, William Pitt Fessenden, Joseph S. Fowler, James W. Grimes, John B. Henderson, Lyman Trumbull, Daniel S. Norton, and Edmund G. Ross (the latter of whom provided the decisive vote). After the trial, Congressman Benjamin Butler conducted hearings on the widespread reports that Republican senators had been bribed to vote for Johnson's acquittal. In Butler's hearings, and in subsequent inquiries, there was increasing evidence that some acquittal votes were acquired by promises of patronage jobs and cash cards.

West Virginia Governor Arthur Boreman was elected to succeed Van Winkle.

Van Winkle also served as a delegate to the Southern Loyalist Convention at Philadelphia, Pennsylvania in 1866.

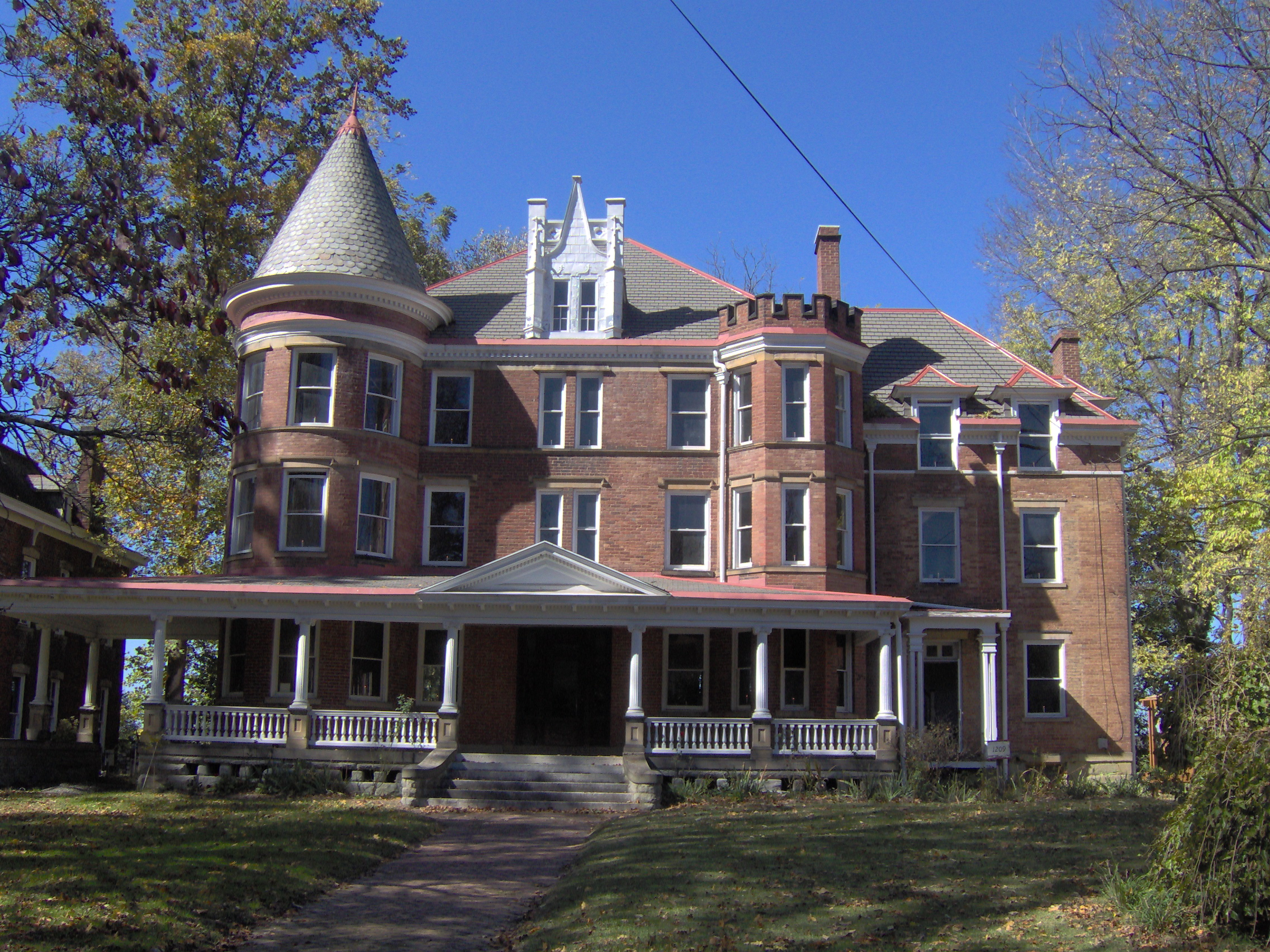
Former Home of Peter Van Winkle in Parkersburg, WV

== Death and legacy ==
Van Winkle died in Parkersburg in 1872. He was buried beside his wife (whom he had survived by nearly three decades) in Riverview Cemetery.

Marshall Van Winkle, Peter Van Winkle's grandnephew, was a U.S. Representative from New Jersey in the Fifty-ninth Congress.

His former home at Parkersburg, now known as the Peter G. Van Winkle House, is a contributing property in the Julia-Ann Square Historic District.

U.S. Senate
| Preceded by None | U.S. senator (Class 1) from West Virginia; 1863–1869; Served alongside: Waitman T. Willey | Succeeded by Arthur I. Boreman |
