= State of Kanawha =

First proposed name for U.S. state split from Virginia

Coordinates: 39°N 81°W

- Unorganized proposed state of the United States
- 1861–1863
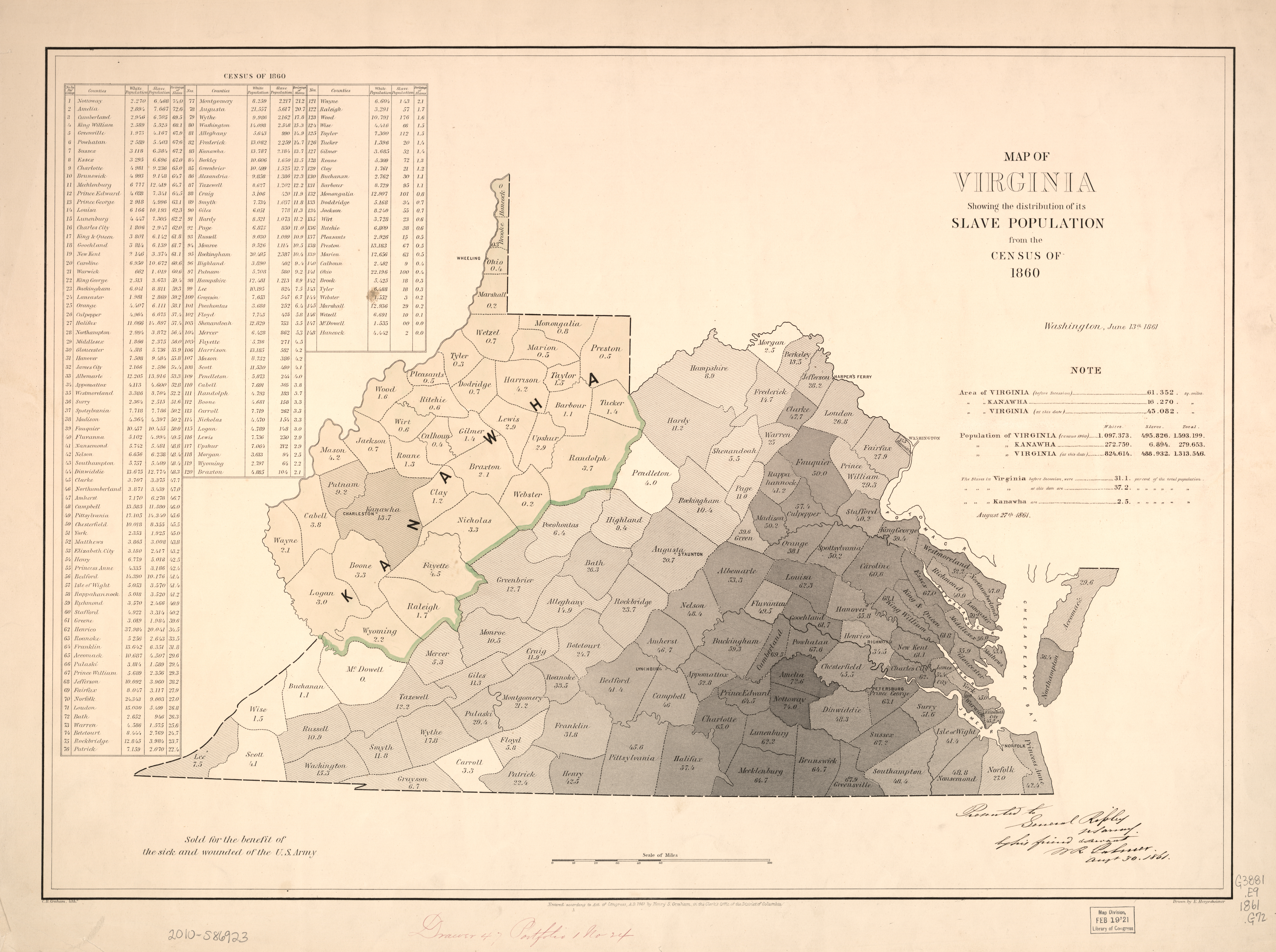
- 1861 map of Kanawha
- Capital: Wheeling, West Virginia
- Historical era: American Civil War
  - Commonwealth of Virginia secedes from the United States and joins the Confederacy: April 16, 1861
  - Second Wheeling Convention votes to secede from Virginia: 20 August 1861
  - Area is wholly admitted to the Union, with additional counties, as "West Virginia": 20 June 1863
Preceded by	Succeeded by
Confederate States of America; Virginia	United States; West Virginia

Kanawha was a proposed name for the 39 counties which later became the main body of the U.S. state of West Virginia, formed on October 24, 1861. It consisted of most of the far northwestern counties of Virginia, which voted to secede from the state after Virginia joined the Confederate States of America at the beginning of the American Civil War on April 17, 1861.

== Background ==
=== The Wheeling Conventions ===
The geopolitical separation from Virginia had been approved by the Second Wheeling Convention of August 20, 1861. The proposed name of "Kanawha" was based on the prominence of the Kanawha River running through the area (itself named after the local Canawagh, or Kanawha, Indian band, which were driven out of the area by the Iroquois (sometime after 1780) and was originally proposed by a committee of the founding convention as the name for the new state.

=== Name change ===
During the First Constitutional Convention held in Wheeling on December 3, 1861, Harmon Sinsel, of Taylor County, made a motion to strike the word Kanawha from the new state constitution. The discussion regarding the motion revealed concerns of possible confusion between the State of Kanawha and the County of Kanawha within the same state. Additionally, there was an expressed desire among the convention members to reflect their Virginian heritage. After much debate, the motion passed 30–14, and a new name was sought.

During the subsequent discussion, names such as "Allegheny", "Augusta", "Columbia", "New Virginia", "Vandalia" (namesake of the failed Vandalia colony of the previous century), "West Virginia", and "Western Virginia" were suggested; it was decided that roll would be called and each member of the convention would answer their name with their preferred name for the new state. When one of the names reached a majority vote, it would be selected as the new name for the state. Upon the roll call, 30 of the 44 members had selected "West Virginia". Having reached a majority, the name for the new state officially became West Virginia.

== Geography ==
During the constitutional convention the boundaries of the new state went through various changes. The original composition of the state consisted of 39 counties, 15 of which were secessionist and had voted in favor of Virginia's secession from the United States on May 23, 1861. Eventually nine more secessionist counties were added to the new state.

== West Virginia statehood ==
West Virginia, by then comprising 50 counties carved out of the Shenandoah Valley and northwestern and southwestern Virginia, was officially announced as a new state by President Abraham Lincoln on April 20, 1863, effective sixty days thereafter. West Virginia was formally admitted to the Union on June 20, 1863.
