= Jacob S. Boreman =

American judge (1831–1913)

Jacob S. Boreman (August 4, 1831 – October 7, 1913) was a justice of the Supreme Court of the Utah Territory from 1873 to 1880, and again from 1885 to 1889.

Born in Middlebourne, Tyler County, Virginia, to Kenner Seaton Boreman and Sarah Inghram of Greene County, Pennsylvania. Jacob attended Washington College from 1850 to 1853 and later studied law at the University of Virginia. In 1855, he received his law degree and joined his brother Arthur's firm.

Jacob relocated in Kansas City, Missouri, in 1858, where he maintaining his Unionist beliefs. Before the outbreak of the Civil War, he joined the Missouri State Militia and recruited troops for the Union Army at the outset of the conflict. In the April 1861 Kansas City municipal elections, Jacob joined the Unionist ticket with Robert T. Van Horn, and they successfully removed the Secessionists from city leadership; Jacob won the City Attorney office.

His military service was curtailed when Governor Hamilton Gamble requested his appointment to fill two vacant judicial positions in the spring of 1862. General Schofield released Jacob Boreman from military service to fulfil the request. The following year, he was elected as a judge and served in the criminal courts in Jackson County, Missouri. Historian Leonard Arrington speculated that "these associations" in Jackson County, near the scene of the "Mormon War" of the 1830s, may have led to "his hatred and distrust of Mormons."

He became a Republican and was twice elected to the Missouri State Legislature. During the American Civil War, he raised a company of militia for the Union. In 1873, President Ulysses S. Grant appointed Boreman associate justice of the territorial Utah Supreme Court, to which Boreman was reappointed by President Rutherford B. Hayes in 1877.

Boreman resigned from the Supreme Court Bench in 1880 to enter the practice of law in Salt Lake City, in which practice he continued until 1885, when he was again appointed to the Supreme Court of Utah. When in 1889 his term expired, he moved to Ogden where he engaged in the practice of law until 1897.

Boreman retired from public life in 1897, having "taken a very active part, political and legal, in three states", and living in retirement until his death, at his home on Jefferson Avenue in Ogden, Utah.

Political offices
Preceded by Cyrus M. Hawley; Stephen R. Twiss	Justice of the Utah Supreme Court; 1873–1880; 1885–1889	Succeeded by Stephen R. Twiss; Thomas J. Anderson
