= Arthur I. Boreman =

American lawyer, politician and judge (1823–1896)

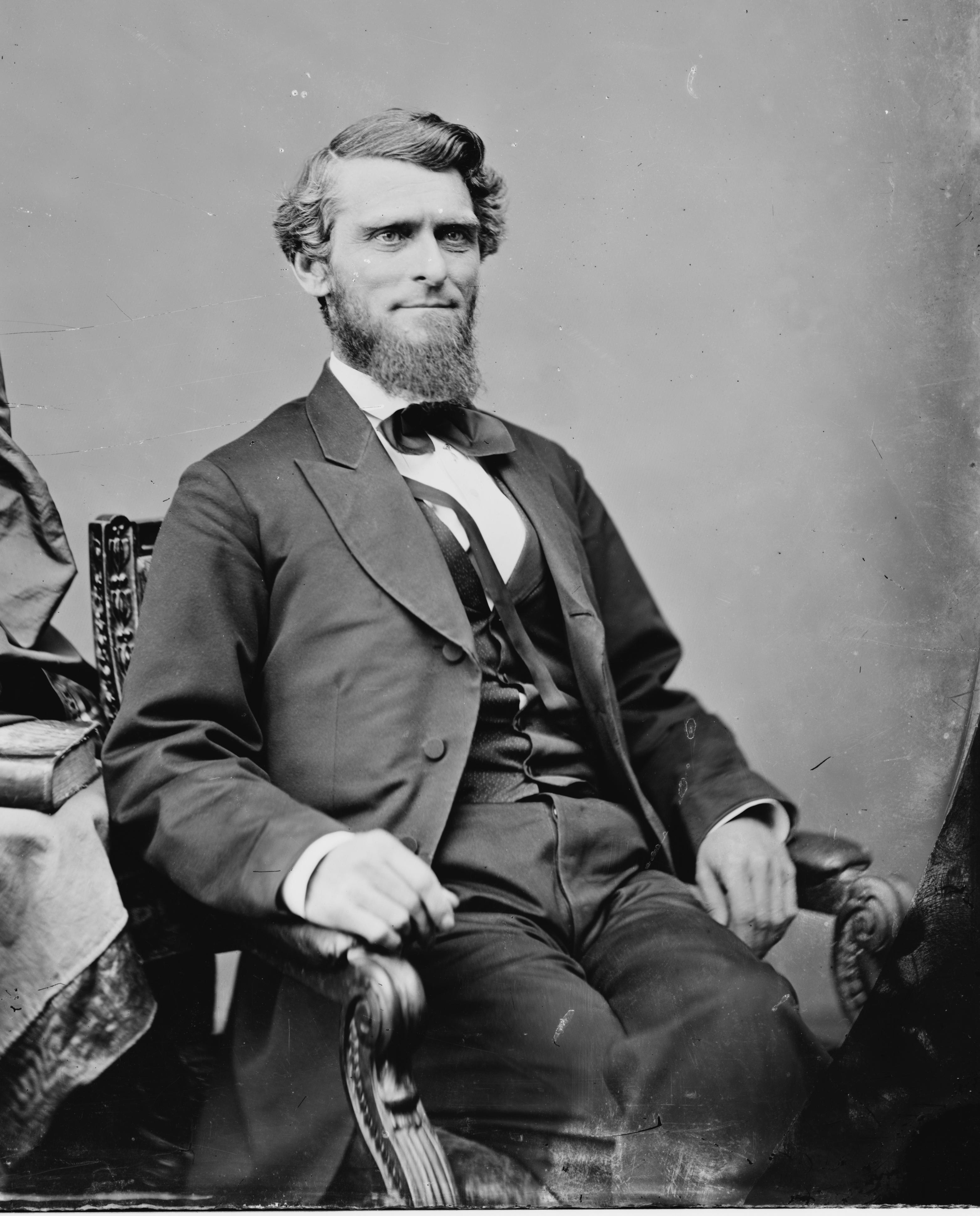
- Boreman, 1860–1875

United States Senator from West Virginia
- In office March 4, 1869 – March 3, 1875
- Preceded by: Peter G. Van Winkle
- Succeeded by: Allen T. Caperton

1st Governor of West Virginia
- In office June 20, 1863 – February 26, 1869
- Preceded by: Francis Harrison Pierpont as Governor of the Restored Government of Virginia
- Succeeded by: Daniel D. T. Farnsworth

Member of the Virginia House of Delegates from the Wood County district
- In office December 3, 1855 – April 4, 1861
- Preceded by: John Jay Jackson Jr.
- Succeeded by: n/a

Circuit Judge for Wood County
- In office 1861–1863
- Succeeded by: n/a

Circuit Judge for Wood County
- In office 1888–1896
- Succeeded by: n/a

Personal details
- Born: Arthur Inghram Boreman; July 24, 1823 Waynesburg, Pennsylvania, U.S.
- Died: April 19, 1896 (aged 72) Parkersburg, West Virginia, U.S.
- Party: Republican
- Spouse: Laurane Tanner Bullock Boreman
- Profession: Politician

Arthur Ingram Boreman (July 24, 1823 – April 19, 1896) was an American lawyer, politician and judge who helped found the U.S. state of West Virginia. Raised in Tyler County, West Virginia, he served as the state's first governor, and a United States senator, as well as represented Wood County in the Virginia House of Delegates, and served as a circuit judge before and after his federal service.

== Early and family life ==
Boreman was born in Waynesburg, Pennsylvania, son of Kenner Seaton Boreham and Sarah (Ingram) Boreham. His mother's brother, Arthur B. Ingram, was a member of the Virginia House of Delegates and would later serve in the legislature of the Wisconsin Territory. When Arthur was four, his family relocated to Middlebourne, Tyler County, which was then part of Virginia, and is today part of West Virginia.

On November 30, 1864, he married Laurane Tanner Bullock, widow of a Union soldier, with two sons. They would also have two daughters.

== Career ==
Arthur Boreman read law with an elder brother and James McNeil Stephenson and was admitted to the Virginia bar in 1845. The following year he moved to Parkersburg. Wood County voters elected Boreman as one of their representatives in the Virginia House of Delegates. Re-elected several times, he served in that part-time position from 1855 until 1861. Although not an abolitionist, but rather a Unionist, Boreman tried unsuccessfully to prevent Virginia's secession from the Union in April 1861.

On June 4, 1861, a meeting of Wood County Unionists elected Boreman, Dr. John Moss and Peter G. Van Winkle to the Second Wheeling Convention. Fellow delegates elected him as the convention's President. That convention established the Restored Government of Virginia, which the following year led to establishment of a separate State of West Virginia. His elder brother William I. Boreman (1816–1892) represented Doddridge and Tyler Counties in that convention, and his youngest brother Jacob S. Boreman (1831–1913) served in the Union Army before moving to Utah and becoming a judge.

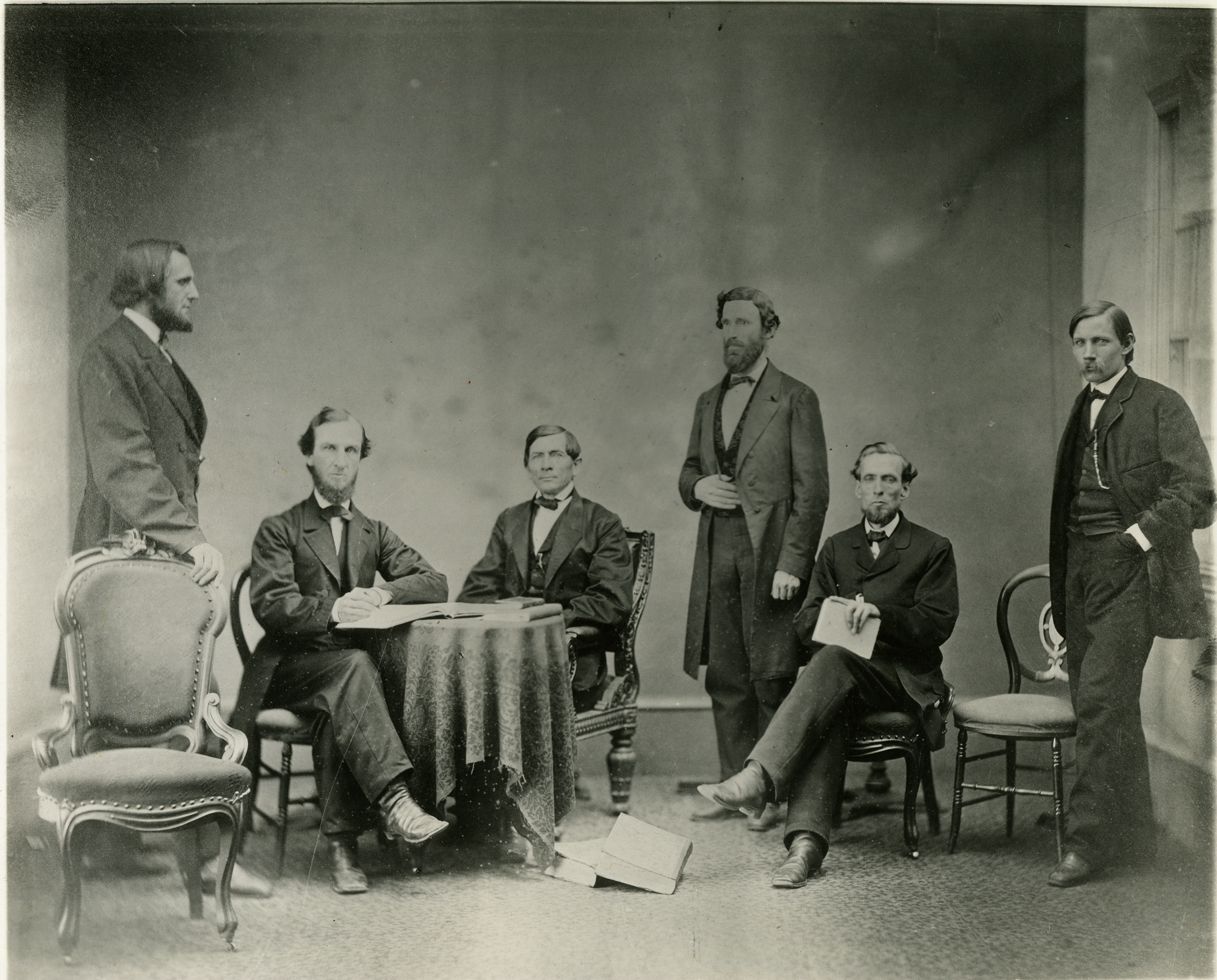
Possible identifications includes, L to R: 1st-Arthur Boreman; 3rd-Andrew Wilson; 4th D.D.T. Farnsworth; 5th- Henry Dering; 6th- Gibson Cranmer.

In 1863, West Virginia voters elected Arthur Boreman as the new state's first governor. He served from 1863 to 1869, winning re-election in 1864 and 1866 (although Virginia's constitutions had forbidden such successive terms). During his third term, Boreman won election to the U.S. Senate to replace Peter G. Van Winkle, and he served from 1869 to 1875. He helped lead efforts to pass the 15th Amendment. When Democrats regained power in West Virginia, Boreman returned to his law practice. He also helped organize recovery efforts after the 1884 Ohio River floods.

In 1888, he was elected the 5th circuit judge and took the bench the following year. He continued to serve until his death seven years later, exhausted after a late trip home from Elizabeth, the Wirt County seat.

== Death and legacy ==
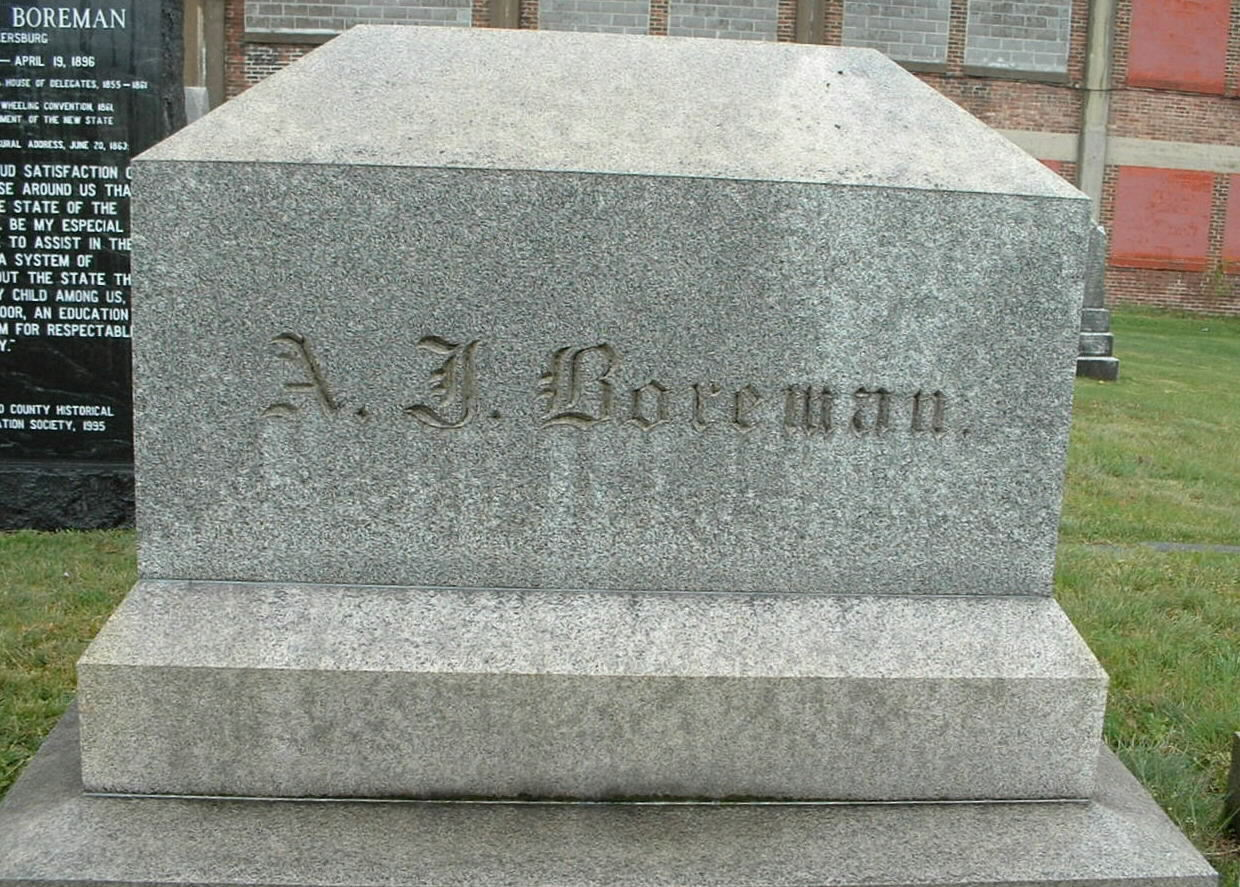
Grave marker of Arthur Boreman at Parkersburg Memorial Gardens

Boreman died in Parkersburg in 1896, survived by his wife, two stepsons and daughter. After services at his home and at the Methodist Episcopal Church where he had long served as a lay leader, he was buried at the Odd Fellows cemetery in Parkersburg. His brother Jacob Smith Boremon became a Justice of the Utah territory Supreme Court and his nephew Herbert Stephenson Boreman (1897–1982) served as a judge on the U.S. Court of Appeals for the Fourth Circuit. Boreman, West Virginia is named for the family.

Boreman Hall, a dormitory on the campus of West Virginia University, is named after him. In addition, Arthur I. Boreman Elementary School is named in his honor in the Tyler County town of Middlebourne, and formerly two elementary schools in the Kanawha County town of Cross Lanes and the outlying Parkersburg area in Wood County were named in his honor.

Party political offices
First	Republican nominee for Governor of West Virginia; 1863, 1864, 1866	Succeeded by William E. Stevenson
Political offices
Preceded by Francis Harrison Pierpont as Governor of the Restored Government of Virginia	Governor of West Virginia; 1863–1869	Succeeded by Daniel D. T. Farnsworth
U.S. Senate
Preceded by Peter G. Van Winkle	U.S. senator (Class 1) from West Virginia; 1869–1875; Served alongside: Waitman T. Willey, Henry G. Davis	Succeeded by Allen T. Caperton
