= List of governors of West Virginia =

Governor of West Virginia
- Seal of the governor

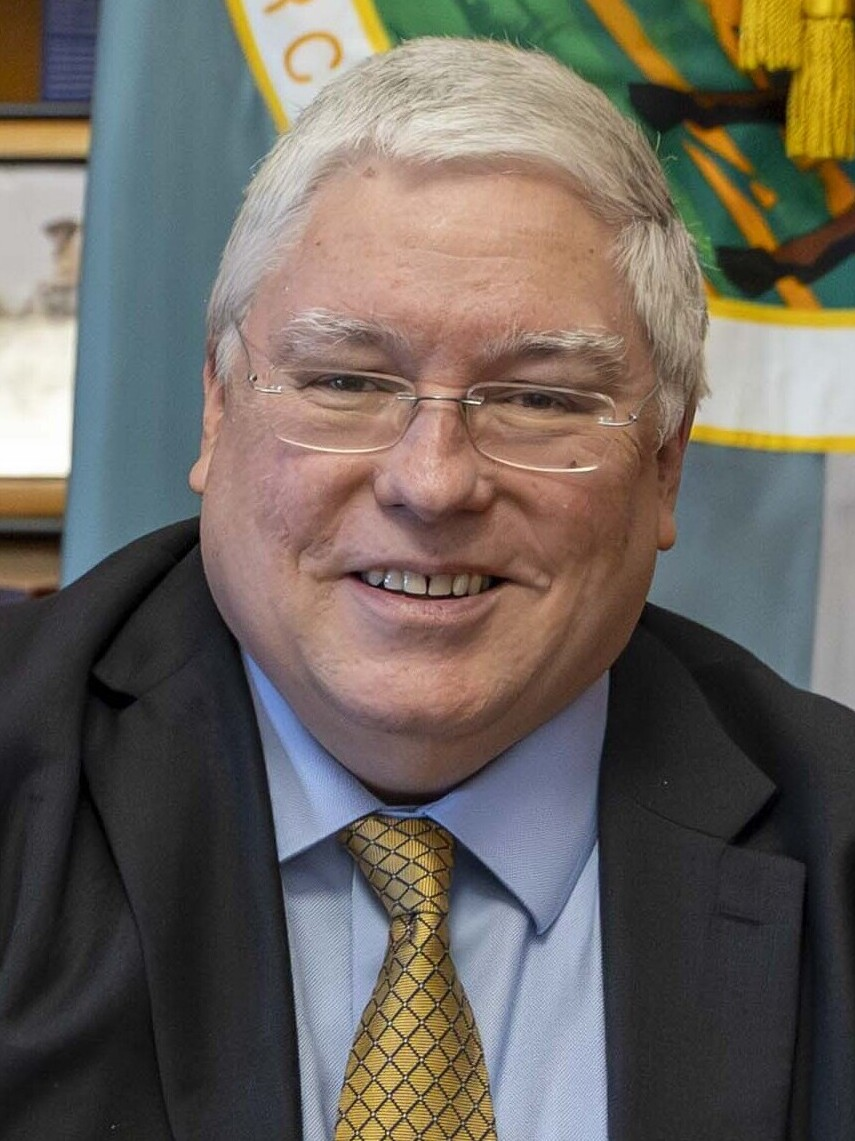
- Incumbent; Patrick Morrisey since January 13, 2025
- Style: Governor (informal); The Honorable (formal)
- Status: Head of state; Head of government
- Residence: West Virginia Governor's Mansion
- Term length: Four years, renewable once consecutively
- Inaugural holder: Arthur I. Boreman
- Formation: June 20, 1863
- Succession: Line of succession
- Salary: $150,000 (2022)
- Website: governor.wv.gov

The governor of West Virginia is the head of government of West Virginia and the commander-in-chief of the state's military forces. The governor has a duty to enforce state laws, and the power to either approve or veto bills passed by the West Virginia Legislature, to convene the legislature at any time, and, except when prosecution has been carried out by the House of Delegates, to grant pardons and reprieves.

Since West Virginia was admitted to the Union on June 20, 1863, during the American Civil War, 37 men have served as governor. Two, Arch A. Moore Jr. (West Virginia's 28th and 30th governor) and Cecil H. Underwood (West Virginia's 25th and 32nd governor), served two nonconsecutive terms in office. The longest-serving governor was Moore, who served for three terms over twelve years. The state's first governor after admission into the Union, Arthur I. Boreman, served the most consecutive terms, resigning a week before the end of his third term. Before the state's admission, Francis Harrison Pierpont, the "Father of West Virginia," was elected governor during the Wheeling Convention of 1861. Daniel D.T. Farnsworth was senate president at the time; he filled the last seven days of Boreman's term and remains the shortest-serving governor. Underwood has the unusual distinction of being both the youngest person to be elected as governor (age 34 upon his first term in 1957) and the oldest to both be elected and serve (age 74 upon his second term in 1997; age 78 at the end of his second term in 2001). The current governor is Republican Patrick Morrisey, who assumed office on January 13, 2025.

To serve as governor, a person must be at least 30 years old, and must have been a citizen of West Virginia for at least five years at the time of inauguration. Under the current Constitution of West Virginia, ratified in 1872, the governor serves a four-year term commencing on the Monday after the second Wednesday in January, following an election. The original constitution of 1863 only called for a two-year term. Since 1968, a governor may be reelected any number of times, but not more than twice in a row. Any partial term served counts toward the limit of two consecutive terms.

The constitution makes no mention of a lieutenant governor; if the governorship becomes vacant, the senate president stands first in the line of succession. If more than one year remains in the governor's term at the time of vacancy, a new election is held for the balance of the term. If less than a year remains, the senate president acts as governor for the remainder of the term. A bill passed in 2000 grants the senate president the honorary title of lieutenant governor, but this title is rarely used in practice and the terms of the senate president do not correspond with governorships. The same bill states that the line of succession after the senate president will be the speaker of the House of Delegates, followed by the state attorney general, the state auditor and former governors, in inverse order of term, that are in residence in the state at the time of the vacancy.

== Qualifications ==
Anyone who seeks to be elected Governor of West Virginia must meet the following qualifications:

- Be a citizen of the United States
- Be a resident of West Virginia for at least five years preceding the election
- Be a duly qualified elector of West Virginia
- Be at least 30 years old

== Governors ==
Governors of the State of West Virginia
No.	Governor	Term in office	Party	Election
1	Arthur I. Boreman (1823–1896)	June 20, 1863 – February 26, 1869 (2079 days; resigned) (Note: Boreman resigned, having been elected to the United States Senate.)	Republican	1863
1	Arthur I. Boreman (1823–1896)	June 20, 1863 – February 26, 1869 (2079 days; resigned)	Republican	1864
1	Arthur I. Boreman (1823–1896)	June 20, 1863 – February 26, 1869 (2079 days; resigned)	Republican	1866
2	Daniel D. T. Farnsworth (1819–1892)	February 26, 1869 – March 4, 1869 (7 days; retired)	Republican	President of the Senate acting
3	William E. Stevenson (1820–1883)	March 4, 1869 – March 4, 1871 (731 days; lost election)	Republican	1868
4	John J. Jacob (1829–1893)	March 4, 1871 – March 4, 1877 (2193 days; term-limited) (Note: Under the 1872 constitution, governors were ineligible for four years after the end of their term.)	Democratic	1870
4	John J. Jacob (1829–1893)	March 4, 1871 – March 4, 1877 (2193 days; term-limited)	People's; Independent	1872
5	Henry M. Mathews (1834–1884)	March 4, 1877 (Note: The constitutional start date of the gubernatorial term was March 4, with no requirement for an oath; Mathews was not sworn in until March 5, presumably because March 4 was a Sunday.) – March 4, 1881 (1462 days; term-limited)	Democratic	1876
6	Jacob B. Jackson (1829–1893)	March 4, 1881 – March 4, 1885 (1462 days; term-limited)	Democratic	1880
7	Emanuel Willis Wilson (1844–1905)	March 4, 1885 – February 6, 1890 (1801 days; term-limited) (Note: The 1888 election was disputed, and though term-limited, Wilson remained as governor until the investigation was complete.)	Democratic	1884
8	Aretas B. Fleming (1839–1923)	February 6, 1890 – March 4, 1893 (1123 days; term-limited)	Democratic	1888
9	William A. MacCorkle (1857–1930)	March 4, 1893 – March 4, 1897 (1462 days; term-limited)	Democratic	1892
10	George W. Atkinson (1845–1925)	March 4, 1897 – March 4, 1901 (1461 days; term-limited)	Republican	1896
11	Albert B. White (1856–1941)	March 4, 1901 – March 4, 1905 (1462 days; term-limited)	Republican	1900
12	William M. O. Dawson (1853–1916)	March 4, 1905 – March 4, 1909 (1462 days; term-limited)	Republican	1904
13	William E. Glasscock (1862–1925)	March 4, 1909 – March 4, 1913 (1462 days; term-limited)	Republican	1908
14	Henry D. Hatfield (1875–1962)	March 4, 1913 – March 4, 1917 (1462 days; term-limited)	Republican	1912
15	John J. Cornwell (1867–1953)	March 4, 1917 – March 4, 1921 (1462 days; term-limited)	Democratic	1916
16	Ephraim F. Morgan (1869–1950)	March 4, 1921 – March 4, 1925 (1462 days; term-limited)	Republican	1920
17	Howard Mason Gore (1877–1947)	March 4, 1925 – March 4, 1929 (1462 days; term-limited)	Republican	1924
18	William G. Conley (1866–1940)	March 4, 1929 – March 4, 1933 (1462 days; term-limited)	Republican	1928
19	Herman G. Kump (1877–1962)	March 4, 1933 – January 18, 1937 (1417 days; term-limited)	Democratic	1932
20	Homer A. Holt (1898–1975)	January 18, 1937 – January 13, 1941 (1457 days; term-limited)	Democratic	1936
21	Matthew M. Neely (1874–1958)	January 13, 1941 – January 15, 1945 (1464 days; term-limited) (Note: Neely, being term-limited, had already won election to the United States House of Representatives when his term ended.)	Democratic	1940
22	Clarence W. Meadows (1904–1961)	January 15, 1945 – January 17, 1949 (1464 days; term-limited)	Democratic	1944
23	Okey Patteson (1898–1989)	January 17, 1949 – January 19, 1953 (1464 days; term-limited)	Democratic	1948
24	William C. Marland (1918–1965)	January 19, 1953 – January 14, 1957 (1457 days; term-limited)	Democratic	1952
25	Cecil H. Underwood (1922–2008)	January 14, 1957 – January 16, 1961 (1464 days; term-limited)	Republican	1956
26	Wally Barron (1911–2002)	January 16, 1961 – January 18, 1965 (1464 days; term-limited)	Democratic	1960
27	Hulett C. Smith (1918–2012)	January 18, 1965 – January 13, 1969 (1457 days; term-limited)	Democratic	1964
28	Arch A. Moore Jr. (1923–2015)	January 13, 1969 – January 17, 1977 (2927 days; term-limited) (Note: Under a 1970 amendment to the constitution, governors who have served two consecutive terms are ineligible for the next term.)	Republican	1968
28	Arch A. Moore Jr. (1923–2015)	January 13, 1969 – January 17, 1977 (2927 days; term-limited)	Republican	1972
29	Jay Rockefeller (1937–2026)	January 17, 1977 – January 14, 1985 (2920 days; term-limited) (Note: Rockefeller, being term-limited, had already won election to the United States Senate when his term ended.)	Democratic	1976
29	Jay Rockefeller (1937–2026)	January 17, 1977 – January 14, 1985 (2920 days; term-limited)	Democratic	1980
30	Arch A. Moore Jr. (1923–2015)	January 14, 1985 – January 16, 1989 (1464 days; lost election)	Republican	1984
31	Gaston Caperton (b. 1940)	January 16, 1989 – January 13, 1997 (2920 days; term-limited)	Democratic	1988
31	Gaston Caperton (b. 1940)	January 16, 1989 – January 13, 1997 (2920 days; term-limited)	Democratic	1992
32	Cecil H. Underwood (1922–2008)	January 13, 1997 – January 15, 2001 (1464 days; lost election)	Republican	1996
33	Bob Wise (b. 1948)	January 15, 2001 – January 17, 2005 (1464 days; retired)	Democratic	2000
34	Joe Manchin (b. 1947)	January 17, 2005 – November 15, 2010 (2129 days; resigned) (Note: Manchin resigned, having been elected to the United States Senate.)	Democratic	2004
34	Joe Manchin (b. 1947)	January 17, 2005 – November 15, 2010 (2129 days; resigned)	Democratic	2008
35	Earl Ray Tomblin (b. 1952)	November 15, 2010 – January 16, 2017 (2255 days; term-limited)	Democratic	President of the Senate acting
35	Earl Ray Tomblin (b. 1952)	November 15, 2010 – January 16, 2017 (2255 days; term-limited)	Democratic	2011 (special)
35	Earl Ray Tomblin (b. 1952)	November 15, 2010 – January 16, 2017 (2255 days; term-limited)	Democratic	2012
36	Jim Justice (b. 1951)	January 16, 2017 – January 13, 2025 (2920 days; term-limited) (Note: Justice, being term-limited, had already won election to the United States Senate when his term ended.)	Democratic (Note: Justice switched to the Republican Party in August 2017.)	2016
36	Jim Justice (b. 1951)	January 16, 2017 – January 13, 2025 (2920 days; term-limited)	Republican	2020
37	Patrick Morrisey (b. 1967)	January 13, 2025 – Incumbent (Note: Morrisey's term will expire on January 15, 2029.) (in office 679 days)	Republican	2024

== Timeline ==
Timeline of West Virginia governors

== See also ==
- Gubernatorial lines of succession in the United States § West Virginia
- President of the West Virginia Senate
- First Lady of West Virginia
- List of West Virginia state legislatures

== Sources ==
- "Former West Virginia Governors". National Governors Association.
- "West Virginia Constitution". State Democracy Research Initiative. University of Wisconsin Law School.
- Glashan, Roy R. (1979). American Governors and Gubernatorial Elections, 1775-1978. Meckler Books. ISBN 0-7201-1511-6 – via Internet Archive.
- Kallenbach, Joseph E.; Kallenbach, Jessamine S. (1977). American State Governors, 1776-1976. Oceana Publications. ISBN 978-0-379-00665-0 – via Internet Archive.
- Mullaney, Marie Marmo (1994). Biographical Directory of the Governors of the United States, 1988–1994. Greenwood Publishing Group. ISBN 0-313-28312-5 – via Internet Archive.
- Sobel, Robert; Raimo, John (1978). Biographical Directory of the Governors of the United States, 1789-1978. Vol. 4. Meckler Books. ISBN 0-930466-01-2 – via Internet Archive.
- Thorpe, Francis Newton, ed. (1909). The Federal and State Constitutions, Colonial Charters, and Other Organic Laws of the States, Territories, and Colonies Now or Heretofore Forming the United States of America. Vol. 7. United States Government Publishing Office – via Internet Archive.
