= 2008 United States Senate election in West Virginia =

- November 4, 2008
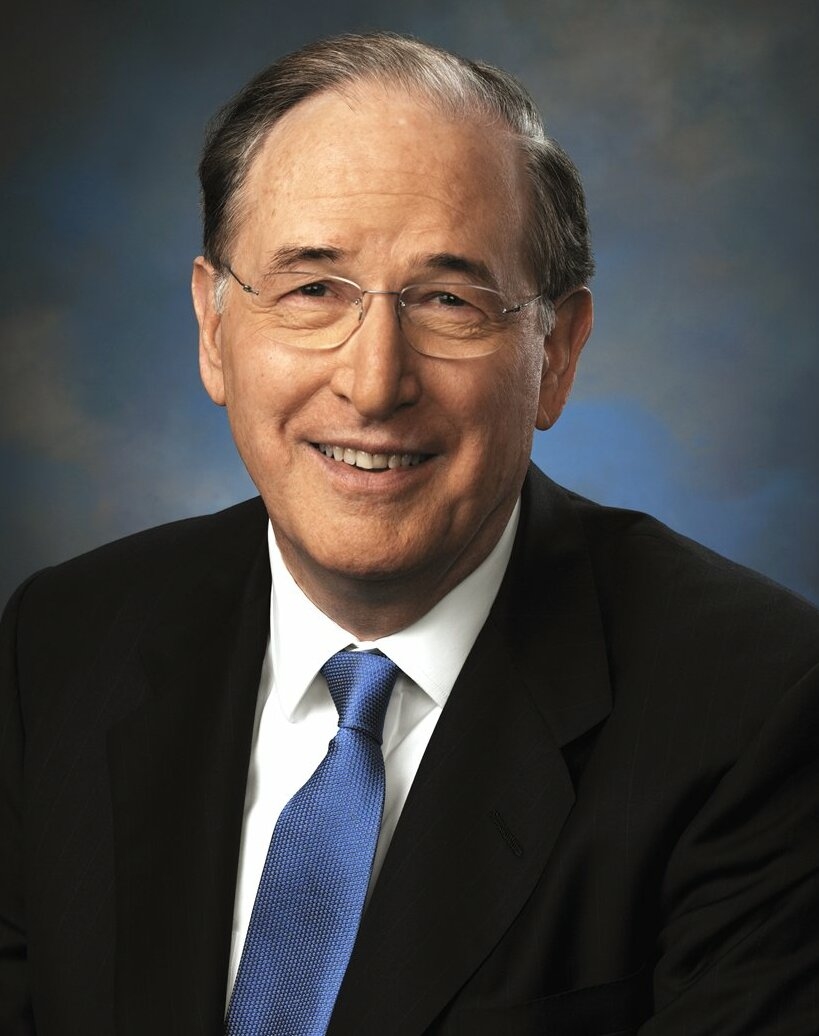

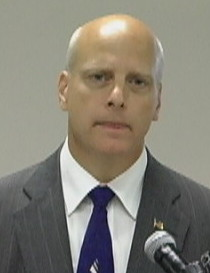
Nominee	Jay Rockefeller	Jay Wolfe
Party	Democratic	Republican
Popular vote	447,560	254,629
Percentage	63.74%	36.26%
- County results Rockefeller: 50–60% 60–70% 70–80% 80–90% Wolfe: 50–60% 60–70%
U.S. senator before election
Jay Rockefeller
Democratic
Elected U.S. Senator
Jay Rockefeller
Democratic

The 2008 United States Senate election in West Virginia was held on November 4, 2008, to elect a member of the United States Senate to represent the state of West Virginia. Democratic incumbent Jay Rockefeller won re-election to a fifth term in a landslide, defeating Republican former nominee Jay Wolfe. As of 2026, this election is the last time a Democrat won West Virginia's Class II U.S. Senate seat.

== Democratic primary ==
=== Candidates ===
==== Nominee ====
- Jay Rockefeller, incumbent U.S. senator (1985–2015)

==== Eliminated in primary ====
- Sheirl Fletcher
- Billy Hendricks

=== Results ===
Democratic primary results
Party	Candidate	Votes	%
Democratic	Jay Rockefeller (incumbent)	271,370	77.1%
Democratic	Sheirl Fletcher	51,073	14.5%
Democratic	Billy Hendricks	29,707	8.4%
Total votes		352,150	100.0%

== Republican primary ==
=== Candidates ===
==== Nominee ====
- Jay Wolfe, former state senator for SD-13, and nominee in 1988 and 2002

=== Results ===
Wolfe was unopposed for the Republican nomination.

== General election ==
=== Predictions ===
Source	Ranking	As of
The Cook Political Report	Safe D	October 23, 2008
CQ Politics	Safe D	October 31, 2008
Rothenberg Political Report	Safe D	November 2, 2008
Real Clear Politics	Safe D	November 4, 2008

=== Polling ===
Poll source	Date(s) administered	Sample size (Note: Key: A – all adults RV – registered voters LV – likely voters V – unclear)	Margin of error	Jay Rockefeller (D)	Jay Wolfe (R)	Other	Undecided
Public Policy Polling (D)	October 29–30, 2008	2,128 (LV)	± 2.1%	58%	40%	–	2%
Rasmussen Reports	September 24, 2008	500 (LV)	± 4.5%	61%	33%	1%	5%

== Results ==
2024 United States Senate election in West Virginia
Party	Candidate	Votes	%	±%
Democratic	Jay Rockefeller (incumbent)	447,560	63.74%	+0.63%
Republican	Jay Wolfe	254,629	36.26%	−0.63%
Total votes		702,189	100.0%	N/A
Democratic hold				

=== Counties that flipped from Republican to Democratic ===
- Morgan (largest municipality: Berkeley Springs)

== See also ==
- 2008 United States elections
