= 1984 West Virginia gubernatorial election =

- November 6, 1984
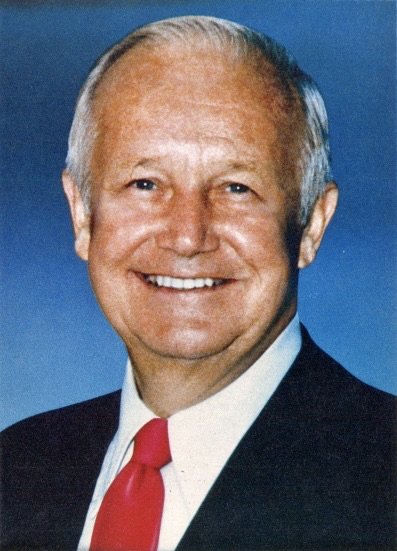

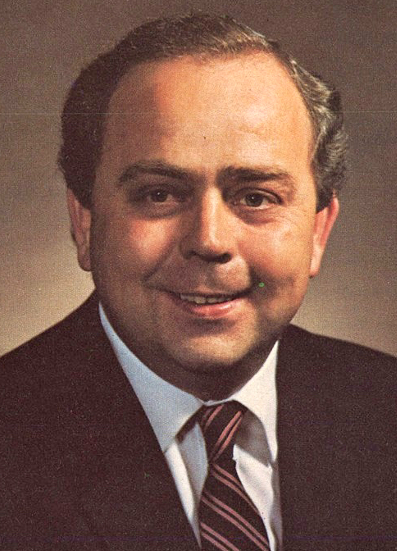
Nominee	Arch A. Moore Jr.	Clyde M. See Jr.
Party	Republican	Democratic
Popular vote	394,937	346,565
Percentage	53.26%	46.74%
- County results Moore: 50–60% 60–70% 70–80% See: 50–60% 60–70% 70–80%
Governor before election
Jay Rockefeller
Democratic
Elected Governor
Arch A. Moore, Jr.
Republican

The 1984 West Virginia gubernatorial election took place on November 6, 1984, to elect the governor of West Virginia. Until 2020, this was the last time West Virginia voted for the Republican candidate for Governor and for President, as both elections are held concurrently in the state.

== Results ==
=== Democratic primary ===
West Virginia Democratic gubernatorial primary, 1984
Party	Candidate	Votes	%
Democratic	Clyde M. See Jr.	148,049	39.84
Democratic	Warren McGraw	104,138	28.02
Democratic	Chauncey H. Browning Jr.	101,712	27.37
Democratic	Dusty Rhodes	7,581	2.04
Democratic	Glenn W. Mullett	5,234	1.41
Democratic	Powell Lane	2,935	0.79
Democratic	E. E. Cumptan	1,960	0.53
Total votes		371,609	100

=== General election ===
West Virginia gubernatorial election, 1984
Party	Candidate	Votes	%
Republican	Arch A. Moore Jr.	394,937	53.26
Democratic	Clyde M. See Jr.	346,565	46.74
Total votes		741,502	100
Republican gain from Democratic			
