= 1976 West Virginia gubernatorial election =

- November 2, 1976
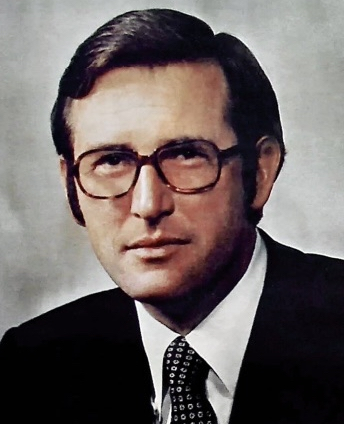

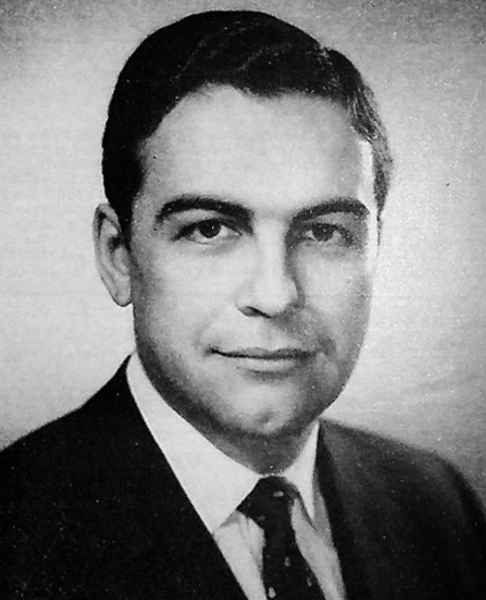
Nominee	Jay Rockefeller	Cecil H. Underwood
Party	Democratic	Republican
Popular vote	495,661	253,420
Percentage	66.15%	33.82%
- County results Rockefeller: 50–60% 60–70% 70–80% 80–90% Underwood: 50–60% 60–70%
Governor before election
Arch A. Moore, Jr.
Republican
Elected Governor
Jay Rockefeller
Democratic

The 1976 West Virginia gubernatorial election took place on November 2, 1976, to elect the governor of West Virginia. Democrat Jay Rockefeller, the nephew of the then current Vice President of the United States, Nelson Rockefeller, defeated Republican Cecil Underwood.

== Results ==
=== Democratic primary ===
Primary results by county: Rockefeller: 30–40%; 40–50%; 50–60%; 60–70%; Sprouse: 50–60%; 60–70%

West Virginia Democratic gubernatorial primary, 1976
Party	Candidate	Votes	%
Democratic	Jay Rockefeller	206,732	49.68
Democratic	James Marshall Sprouse	118,707	28.52
Democratic	Ken Hechler	52,791	12.69
Democratic	John G. Hutchinson	26,222	6.30
Democratic	Ezra H. Graley	4,249	1.02
Democratic	Powell Lane	3,536	0.85
Democratic	H. John Rogers	2,345	0.56
Total votes		414,582	100

=== Republican primary ===
West Virginia Republican gubernatorial primary, 1976
Party	Candidate	Votes	%
Republican	Cecil H. Underwood	97,671	64.36
Republican	Ralph Albertazzie	44,393	29.25
Republican	Melton Maloney	3,408	2.25
Republican	Larry Lunsford	2,593	1.71
Republican	John Lusher	2,442	1.61
Republican	E. E. Cumptan	1,257	0.83
Total votes		151,764	100

=== General election ===
West Virginia gubernatorial election, 1976
Party	Candidate	Votes	%
Democratic	Jay Rockefeller	495,661	66.15
Republican	Cecil H. Underwood	253,420	33.82
Other	Write-ins	189	0.03
Total votes		749,270	100
Democratic gain from Republican			

==== By county ====
County	Jay Rockefeller Democratic		Cecil H. Underwood Republican		Various candidates Other parties		Margin		Total
County	Monongalia								Total
Preston
Totals	495,661	66.15%	253,420	33.82%	189	0.03%	242,241	32.33%	749,270
