= Edwin F. Flowers =

American judge (1930–2022)

Edwin F. Flowers (April 26, 1930 – January 27, 2022) was an American lawyer, civil servant, and judge. He served as a justice of the Supreme Court of Appeals of West Virginia from September 8, 1975 to December 31, 1976.

Flowers was born in New Cumberland, West Virginia, on April 26, 1920. He graduated from West Virginia University in 1952 and then earned a law degree there in 1954. He served in the US Air Force as a Judge Advocate from 1954 to 1956, and then went into private practice in his home county of Hancock, West Virginia. A Republican, Flowers served as Commissioner of the West Virginia Department of Welfare 1969-75, and was then appointed by governor Arch A. Moore to the West Virginia Supreme Court to fill the vacancy created by the resignation of James Marshall Sprouse. In a Democrat-dominated state, Republican Flowers was not elected to a full term in 1976.

After serving as a federal bankruptcy judge in the Southern District of West Virginia, Flowers served as Vice-President of Institutional Advancement at West Virginia University from 1983 to 1997.

From 2009 to 2012 Flowers served as a commissioner of Volunteer West Virginia, the West Virginia Commission for National and Community Service.

Flowers and his wife, Eleanor, lived in Morgantown, West Virginia. He died on January 27, 2022, at the age of 91.

== Works ==
- A complete guide to the higher education laws of West Virginia: Selected statutes, comments, and materials, 1998
- 2000 Supplement to Higher Education Laws of West Virginia, 2000
- State Auditor's Handbook for West Virginia Licensing Boards: Draft, 2000
- Computer Smarts for Grandparents, 2000
- To: Adam and Katie - Nice Things Said About Your Grandpa (Excerpts of tribute letters and news clips), 2015
