= 1980 West Virginia gubernatorial election =

- November 4, 1980
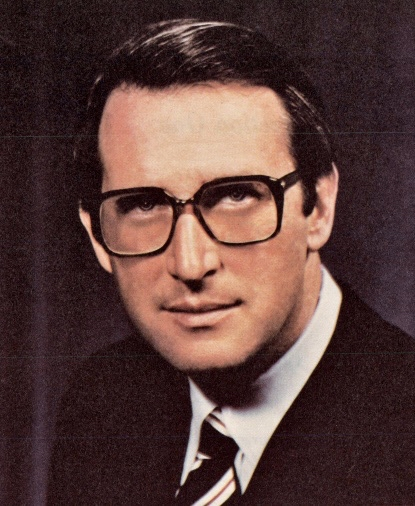

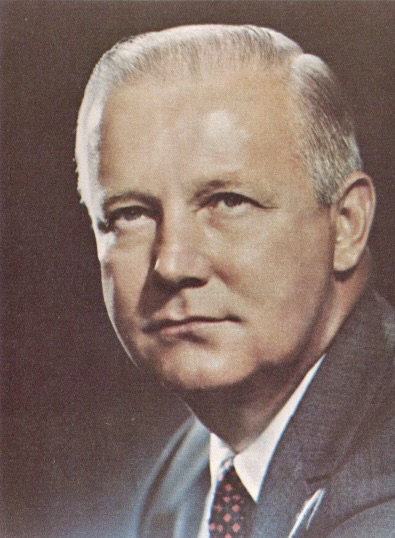
Nominee	Jay Rockefeller	Arch A. Moore Jr.
Party	Democratic	Republican
Popular vote	401,863	337,240
Percentage	54.15%	45.44%
- County results Rockefeller: 40–50% 50–60% 60–70% 70–80% Moore: 50–60% 60–70% 70–80%
Governor before election
Jay Rockefeller
Democratic
Elected Governor
Jay Rockefeller
Democratic

The 1980 West Virginia gubernatorial election took place on November 4, 1980, to elect the governor of West Virginia. Incumbent Governor Jay Rockefeller defeated former Governor Arch Moore in a rematch of the 1972 contest. This election was the first time ever that a Democratic nominee was re-elected Governor of West Virginia.

== Results ==
=== Democratic primary ===
West Virginia Democratic gubernatorial primary, 1980
Party	Candidate	Votes	%
Democratic	Jay Rockefeller (incumbent)	250,550	78.05
Democratic	H. John Rogers	70,452	21.95
Total votes		321,002	100.00

=== General election ===
West Virginia gubernatorial election, 1980
Party	Candidate	Votes	%
Democratic	Jay Rockefeller (incumbent)	401,863	54.15
Republican	Arch A. Moore, Jr.	337,240	45.44
Libertarian	Jack Kelley	3,047	0.41
Total votes		742,150	100.00
Democratic hold			
