= Senator Carrigan =

Senator Carrigan may refer to:

- James J. Carrigan (born 1941), Massachusetts State Senate
- John E. Carrigan (1910–1984), West Virginia State Senate
