= 1988 West Virginia gubernatorial election =

- November 8, 1988
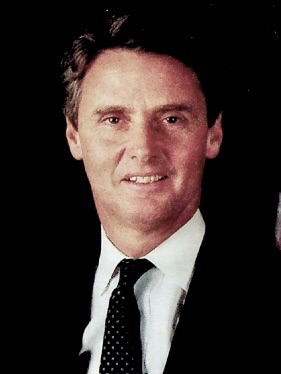

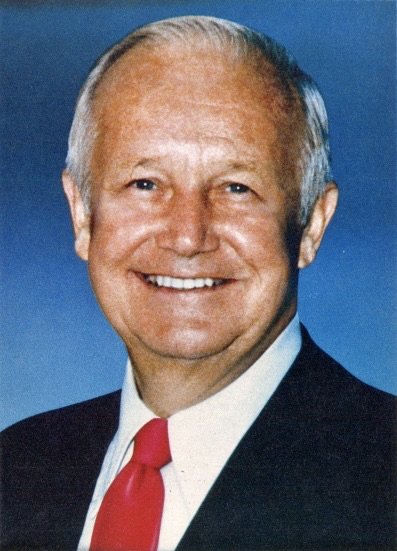
Nominee	Gaston Caperton	Arch A. Moore Jr.
Party	Democratic	Republican
Popular vote	382,421	267,172
Percentage	58.87%	41.13%
- County results Caperton: 50–60% 60–70% 70–80% Moore: 50–60% 60–70% 70–80%
Governor before election
Arch A. Moore, Jr.
Republican
Elected Governor
Gaston Caperton
Democratic

The 1988 West Virginia gubernatorial election took place on November 8, 1988 to elect the governor of West Virginia. Incumbent Republican governor Arch A. Moore Jr. ran for re-election to a fourth term in office, but was defeated by Democratic nominee Gaston Caperton.

== Results ==
=== Democratic primary ===
West Virginia Democratic gubernatorial primary, 1988
Party	Candidate	Votes	%
Democratic	Gaston Caperton	132,435	37.96%
Democratic	Clyde M. See, Jr.	94,364	27.05%
Democratic	Mario Palumbo	51,722	14.83%
Democratic	Gus Douglass	48,748	13.97%
Democratic	Dan R. Tonkovich	14,916	4.28%
Democratic	Larry Harless	5,217	1.50%
Democratic	Paul Nuchims	1,484	0.43%
Total votes		348,886	100.00%

=== Republican primary ===
Republican Primary results by county: Moore Jr.: 50–60%; 60–70%; 70–80%; Raese: 50–60%; 60–70%; Tie 50%

West Virginia Republican gubernatorial primary, 1988
Party	Candidate	Votes	%
Republican	Arch A. Moore Jr. (incumbent)	78,495	53.23%
Republican	John Raese	68,973	46.77%
Total votes		147,468	100.00%

=== General election ===
West Virginia gubernatorial election, 1988
Party	Candidate	Votes	%
Democratic	Gaston Caperton	382,421	58.87
Republican	Arch A. Moore Jr. (incumbent)	267,172	41.13
Total votes		649,593	100.00
Democratic gain from Republican			
