= Peter Beter =

American lawyer (1921–1987)

Peter David Beter
- Born: June 21, 1921; Huntington, West Virginia, U.S.
- Died: March 14, 1987 (aged 65)

Peter David Beter (June 21, 1921 – March 14, 1987) was an American attorney and financier. He ran for governor of West Virginia in 1968 in the Republican Party primary (although he was formerly a Democrat), but lost in the primaries to Arch A. Moore Jr.. Politically, he was a staunch admirer of ex-Alabama governor George Wallace; Beter also drafted Wallace as the American Party candidate in 1973, but numerous Republicans opposed such efforts. Nonetheless, he later became a member of his Draft-Wallace committee.

== Biography ==
Beter was a native of Huntington, West Virginia, son of Lebanese immigrants who became grocers after coming to the United States in 1899. He graduated from West Virginia University and later got his Doctor of Juris degree in law from the law school of George Washington University. Beter practiced law in Washington, D.C. from 1951 to 1961. He was the general counsel for the American Gold Association (now called the Gold Prospectors Association of America) from 1958 to 1961. In 1961, he was appointed by President John F. Kennedy as general counsel for the Export–Import Bank of the United States, in which he served until 1967. Beter also co-founded a mining exploration company in Zaire, and represented international financial interests in Europe, South America, and the Middle East.

In 1973, he published a book: Conspiracy Against the Dollar: The Spirit of the New Imperialism, which alleged that world events were controlled by three secret factions: the Rockefeller family, the "Bolshevik–Zionist axis", and the Kremlin. His intent was to warn everyone against the plans of the "Rockefeller Cartel", which he thought risked having the United States meet the same fate as France in World War II.

In 1974, Beter publicly stated that most of the gold in Fort Knox had been sold to European interests, at prices vastly below market rates. According to him, international speculators had dishonestly obtained the gold. (Note: "One Rockefeller detractor, Peter Beter, even charged that the Fort Knox gold had been spirited away in the dead of night only to wind up in the European vaults of David Rockefeller. This charge was proved to be erroneous as Mary T. Brooks, director of the U.S. Mint, conducted a group of congressmen on a rare visit to the Kentucky vaults. Yes, the gold was there and intact.")

Beter released a series of 80 audio newsletter tapes between 1975 and 1982. He was known for his claims without evidence against political leaders, some of which included allegations of conspiracy in the highest political positions; he said that:

- Vice President Lyndon B. Johnson was involved in the assassination of John F. Kennedy.
- Several important public figures such as David Rockefeller, Henry Kissinger, and Jimmy Carter were actually dead, and are being impersonated by organic "robotoids".
- Patty Hearst was kidnapped by the Central Intelligence Agency (CIA) after the Hearst newspaper chain published secret Congressional testimony. This testimony revealed that America's atomic secrets were handed over to the Soviet Union – not stolen by Soviet spies, before America's first atomic bomb was finished, and that the Rockefellers were directly involved in this plot.
- The CIA was responsible for the secret death of General George Scratchley Brown because he simply knew "too much".
- The Jonestown massacre was staged to camouflage a joint U.S.–Israeli military operation to destroy a Soviet missile base in Guyana. The Jonestown incident explained the movement of U.S. military personnel into Guyana and concealed the real count of casualties from the attack on the Soviet base.
- Particle beam weapons and other advanced aerial weapons under secret development had the power to change the weather. Both the U.S. and the Soviet Union had developed such weapons.

== In contemporary culture ==
Through his tapes, Beter influenced various people such as the 1980s punk band, The Wanderers. In the Crusaders Comic book series published by Jack Chick, Double Cross: Alberto, part two, Beter is cited as a reliable authority on why the body count changed in the wake of the Jonestown massacre.

== See also ==
- New World Order (conspiracy theory)
- Rothschild family
