= M. Blane Michael =

American judge (1943–2011)

Martin Blane Michael

Judge of the United States Court of Appeals for the Fourth Circuit
- In office October 1, 1993 – March 25, 2011
- Appointed by: Bill Clinton
- Preceded by: James Marshall Sprouse
- Succeeded by: Stephanie Thacker

Personal details
- Born: Martin Blane Michael; February 17, 1943 Charleston, South Carolina
- Died: March 25, 2011 (aged 68) Charleston, West Virginia
- Education: West Virginia University (AB); New York University (JD)

Martin Blane Michael (February 17, 1943 – March 25, 2011) was a United States circuit judge of the United States Court of Appeals for the Fourth Circuit.

== Education and career ==
Born in Charleston, South Carolina, Michael grew up in Grant County, West Virginia, and in 1965 he earned an Artium Baccalaureus degree, magna cum laude, at West Virginia University, where he was student body president and elected to Phi Beta Kappa. He then attended New York University School of Law, where he earned a Juris Doctor in 1968. He spent three years in private practice (at the New York law firm of Sullivan & Cromwell) before becoming an Assistant United States Attorney for the Southern District of New York in 1971, handling criminal cases. Michael's contemporaries in the United States Attorney's Office included John M. Walker Jr. and Richard Ben-Veniste. For family reasons Michael returned to his home state in 1972, becoming a Special Assistant United States Attorney in the Northern District of West Virginia. From 1973 to 1975 he was in private practice in Petersburg, West Virginia, and he served for one year as a law clerk to United States District Judge Robert Earl Maxwell of the Northern District of West Virginia from 1975 to 1976.

After John D. Rockefeller IV was elected Governor of West Virginia, Michael served from 1977 to 1980 as Counsel to the Governor. In 1981 he returned to private practice (at the state's oldest and largest law firm, Jackson Kelly, in Charleston, West Virginia), where he worked as a commercial litigator until his appointment to the Court of Appeals in 1993. While in private practice Michael also served at one point as campaign manager for the re-election of United States Senator Robert C. Byrd.

== Federal judicial service ==
Michael was nominated by President Bill Clinton on August 6, 1993, to a seat on the United States Court of Appeals for the Fourth Circuit vacated by James Marshall Sprouse. Michael's confirmation by the United States Senate on September 30, 1993, made him the first federal judge to be appointed by a Democratic president since Ronald Reagan became President in 1981. Michael received his commission on October 1, 1993 and began judicial service on October 12, 1993.

In 2004, Michael wrote the opinion in East Tennessee Natural Gas Co. v. Sage, a highly-influential case on condemnation under the Natural Gas Act.

== Judicial philosophy ==
Michael had often been in disagreement with his judicial colleagues on the Fourth Circuit, which was known in the 1990s as the "boldest" conservative appellate court in the United States. However, by the end of Michael's tenure, the Fourth Circuit had begun to shift philosophically after President Barack Obama appointed a majority of its judges during his tenure.

Michael also fostered collegiality on the court. As Circuit Judge J. Harvie Wilkinson III noted in a 2005 speech published in the Northwestern University Law Review, Michael and Wilkinson would jog together in their spare time when they were in Richmond, Virginia to hear oral arguments, even though they have very different judicial perspectives. According to newspaper accounts, when officials in the administration of President George W. Bush consulted Senator Byrd in the summer of 2005 about the United States Supreme Court vacancy caused by the death of Chief Justice William H. Rehnquist, Byrd suggested Michael be nominated to fill the seat.

== Death ==
After a long illness, Michael died on March 25, 2011, in Charleston, West Virginia.

== Sources ==
Legal offices
Preceded by James Marshall Sprouse	Judge of the United States Court of Appeals for the Fourth Circuit; 1993–2011	Succeeded by Stephanie Thacker
