= Justice Carrigan =

Justice Carrigan may refer to:

- Jim Carrigan (judge) (1929–2014), associate justice of the Colorado Supreme Court
- John E. Carrigan (1910–1984), associate justice of the Supreme Court of Appeals of West Virginia
