= 1968 West Virginia gubernatorial election =

- November 5, 1968
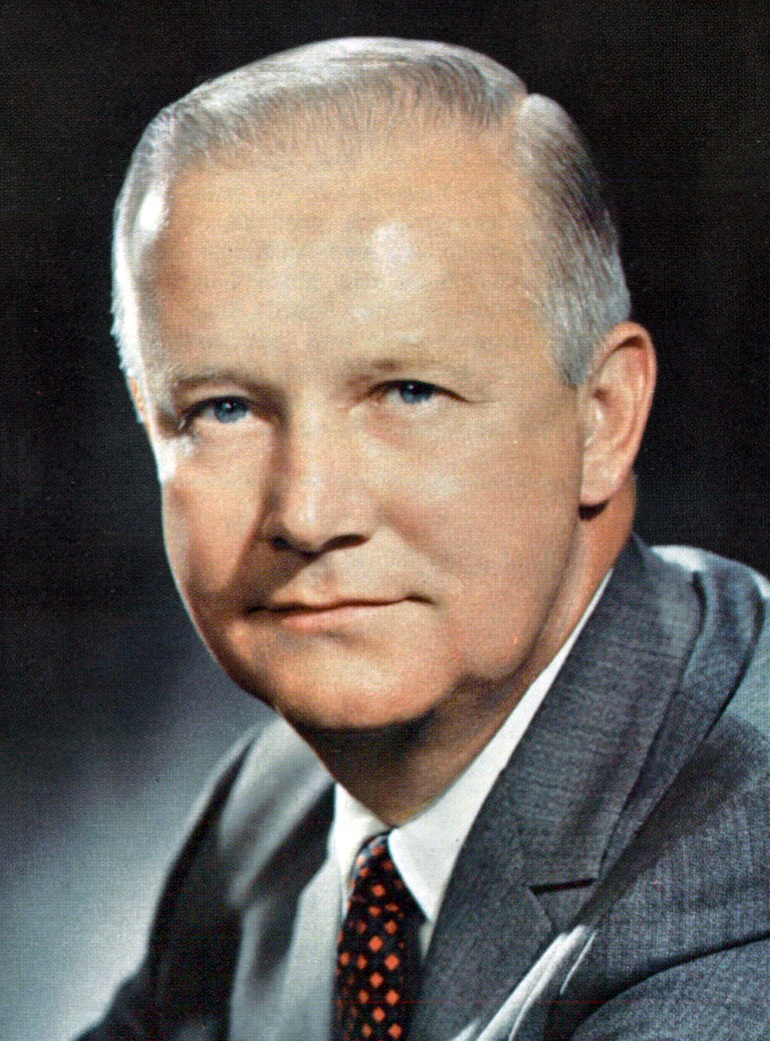

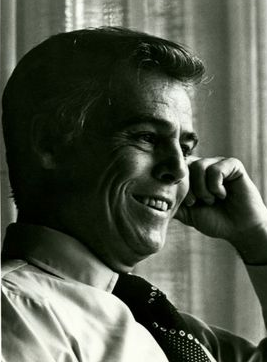
Nominee	Arch A. Moore Jr.	James M. Sprouse
Party	Republican	Democratic
Popular vote	378,315	365,530
Percentage	50.09%	49.01%
- County results Moore: 50–60% 60–70% 70–80% Sprouse: 50–60% 60–70% 70–80%
Governor before election
Hulett C. Smith
Democratic
Elected Governor
Arch A. Moore, Jr.
Republican

The 1968 West Virginia gubernatorial election took place on November 5, 1968, to elect the governor of West Virginia.

== Democratic primary ==
=== Candidates ===
- William A. Lawson
- Paul J. Kaufman, State Senator from Charleston
- C. Donald Robertson, West Virginia Attorney General
- James Marshall Sprouse, attorney
- Blair F. Winans

=== Results ===
1968 West Virginia Democratic gubernatorial primary
Party	Candidate	Votes	%
Democratic	James Marshall Sprouse	123,181	37.62
Democratic	C. Donald Robertson	118,637	36.23
Democratic	Paul J. Kaufman	72,917	22.27
Democratic	William A. Lawson	8,254	2.60
Democratic	Blair F. Winans	4,164	1.27
Total votes		327,423	100

== Republican primary ==
=== Candidates ===
- Peter Beter, former general counsel for the Export–Import Bank of the United States and supporter of George Wallace
- E.C. Cales
- Arch A. Moore, Jr., U.S. Representative
- Cecil H. Underwood, academic and former Governor

==== Results ====
1968 West Virginia Republican gubernatorial primary
Party	Candidate	Votes	%
Republican	Arch A. Moore, Jr.	106,299	57.00
Republican	Cecil H. Underwood	76,659	41.11
Republican	Peter Beter	1,844	0.99
Republican	E. C. Cales	1,677	0.90
Total votes		186,479	100

== General election ==
1968 West Virginia gubernatorial election
Party	Candidate	Votes	%
Republican	Arch A. Moore, Jr.	378,315	50.86
Democratic	James Marshall Sprouse	365,530	49.14
Total votes		743,845	100
Republican gain from Democratic			

=== Results by county ===
County	Archibald Alfred Moore Republican		James Marshall Sprouse Democratic		Margin		Total votes cast
County	#	%	#	%	#	%	Total votes cast
Barbour	3,753	55.17%	3,050	44.83%	703	10.33%	6,803
Berkeley	8,223	58.82%	5,756	41.18%	2,467	17.65%	13,979
Boone	3,829	37.69%	6,329	62.31%	-2,500	-24.61%	10,158
Braxton	3,106	50.25%	3,075	49.75%	31	0.50%	6,181
Brooke	8,259	62.96%	4,859	37.04%	3,400	25.92%	13,118
Cabell	21,313	50.57%	20,833	49.43%	480	1.14%	42,146
Calhoun	1,949	54.66%	1,617	45.34%	332	9.31%	3,566
Clay	1,658	44.55%	2,064	55.45%	-406	-10.91%	3,722
Doddridge	2,110	74.40%	726	25.60%	1,384	48.80%	2,836
Fayette	6,602	31.03%	14,671	68.97%	-8,069	-37.93%	21,273
Gilmer	1,657	52.04%	1,527	47.96%	130	4.08%	3,184
Grant	2,952	75.97%	934	24.03%	2,018	51.93%	3,886
Greenbrier	6,244	46.85%	7,083	53.15%	-839	-6.30%	13,327
Hampshire	2,081	48.52%	2,208	51.48%	-127	-2.96%	4,289
Hancock	11,940	64.17%	6,666	35.83%	5,274	28.35%	18,606
Hardy	1,965	50.32%	1,940	49.68%	25	0.64%	3,905
Harrison	19,579	56.60%	15,015	43.40%	4,564	13.19%	34,594
Jackson	5,712	59.89%	3,825	40.11%	1,887	19.79%	9,537
Jefferson	3,018	45.70%	3,586	54.30%	-568	-8.60%	6,604
Kanawha	50,291	51.93%	46,549	48.07%	3,742	3.86%	96,840
Lewis	4,709	60.42%	3,085	39.58%	1,624	20.84%	7,794
Lincoln	3,925	45.71%	4,662	54.29%	-737	-8.58%	8,587
Logan	6,754	33.68%	13,300	66.32%	-6,546	-32.64%	20,054
Marion	16,179	55.37%	13,039	44.63%	3,140	10.75%	29,218
Marshall	10,739	62.82%	6,356	37.18%	4,383	25.64%	17,095
Mason	5,320	50.47%	5,220	49.53%	100	0.95%	10,540
McDowell	4,613	24.91%	13,905	75.09%	-9,292	-50.18%	18,518
Mercer	11,211	43.56%	14,528	56.44%	-3,317	-12.89%	25,739
Mineral	5,073	51.72%	4,735	48.28%	338	3.45%	9,808
Mingo	4,292	31.50%	9,333	68.50%	-5,041	-37.00%	13,625
Monongalia	11,914	50.14%	11,848	49.86%	66	0.28%	23,762
Monroe	2,954	50.56%	2,888	49.44%	66	1.13%	5,842
Morgan	2,394	65.68%	1,251	34.32%	1,143	31.36%	3,645
Nicholas	4,321	46.43%	4,986	53.57%	-665	-7.15%	9,307
Ohio	20,082	65.96%	10,366	34.04%	9,716	31.91%	30,448
Pendleton	1,901	52.94%	1,690	47.06%	211	5.88%	3,591
Pleasants	1,603	49.17%	1,657	50.83%	-54	-1.66%	3,260
Pocahontas	2,229	50.94%	2,147	49.06%	82	1.87%	4,376
Preston	6,060	60.02%	4,036	39.98%	2,024	20.05%	10,096
Putnam	5,996	52.05%	5,524	47.95%	472	4.10%	11,520
Raleigh	11,105	38.29%	17,900	61.71%	-6,795	-23.43%	29,005
Randolph	5,495	50.57%	5,371	49.43%	124	1.14%	10,866
Ritchie	3,213	69.58%	1,405	30.42%	1,808	39.15%	4,618
Roane	3,941	58.85%	2,756	41.15%	1,185	17.69%	6,697
Summers	2,684	40.97%	3,867	59.03%	-1,183	-18.06%	6,551
Taylor	4,085	63.40%	2,358	36.60%	1,727	26.80%	6,443
Tucker	1,803	50.24%	1,786	49.76%	17	0.47%	3,589
Tyler	3,147	69.96%	1,351	30.04%	1,796	39.93%	4,498
Upshur	4,881	66.80%	2,426	33.20%	2,455	33.60%	7,307
Wayne	6,581	40.80%	9,548	59.20%	-2,967	-18.40%	16,129
Webster	1,428	35.24%	2,624	64.76%	-1,196	-29.52%	4,052
Wetzel	5,537	61.67%	3,442	38.33%	2,095	23.33%	8,979
Wirt	1,075	54.40%	901	45.60%	174	8.81%	1,976
Wood	20,329	56.02%	15,962	43.98%	4,367	12.03%	36,291
Wyoming	4,501	39.26%	6,964	60.74%	-2,463	-21.48%	11,465
Totals	378,315	50.86%	365,530	49.14%	12,785	1.72%	743,845
