= 1968 West Virginia Secretary of State election =

- November 5, 1968
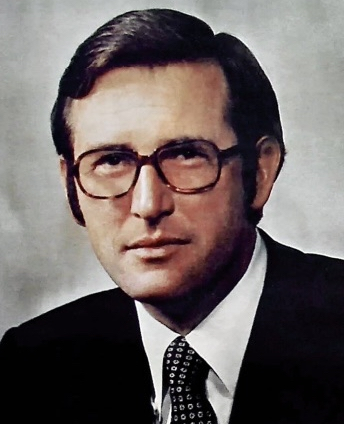

Nominee	Jay Rockefeller	John S. Callebs
Party	Democratic	Republican
Popular vote	433,142	277,877
Percentage	60.92%	39.08%
Secretary of State before election
Robert D. Bailey Jr.
Democratic
Elected Secretary of State
Jay Rockefeller
Democratic

The 1968 West Virginia Secretary of State election was held on November 5, 1968, to elect the Secretary of State of West Virginia. Democratic incumbent Robert D. Bailey Jr., first appointed in 1965, chose not to run for election to a full term. Democratic West Virginia House of Delegates member Jay Rockefeller won the election, defeating Republican college professor John S. Callebs by twenty-one percentage points.

== Democratic primary ==
=== Nominee ===
- Jay Rockefeller, Member of the West Virginia House of Delegates from Kanawha County (1966–1968)

=== Eliminated in primary ===
- Orel J. Skeen, former West Virginia State Treasurer (1956–1960)
- Richard Baylor, school teacher

=== Results ===
Democratic primary results
Party	Candidate	Votes	%
Democratic	Jay Rockefeller	218,050	74.76%
Democratic	Orel J. Skeen	43,907	15.05%
Democratic	Richard Baylor	29,714	10.19%
Total votes		291,671	100.00%

== Republican primary ==
=== Nominee ===
- John S. Callebs, college professor

=== Results ===
Republican primary results
Party	Candidate	Votes	%
Republican	John S. Callebs	133,298	100.00%
Total votes		133,298	100.00%

== General election ==
=== Candidates ===
- Jay Rockefeller, Member of the West Virginia House of Delegates from Kanawha County (1966–1968) (Democratic)
- John S. Callebs, college professor (Republican)

=== Results ===
1968 West Virginia Secretary of State election results
Party	Candidate	Votes	%	±%
Democratic	Jay Rockefeller	433,142	60.92%	+0.07%
Republican	John S. Callebs	277,877	39.08%	−0.07%
Total votes		711,019	100.00%	
Democratic hold				
