= Emmons, West Virginia =

Unincorporated community in West Virginia, United States

- Unincorporated community
- Location in West Virginia and the United States Emmons (the United States)
- Coordinates: 38°12′16″N 81°29′5″W
- Country: United States
- State: West Virginia
- County: Boone
- Time zone: UTC-5 (Eastern (EST))
  - Summer (DST): UTC-4 (EDT)

Emmons is an unincorporated community located on the Big Coal River in Boone and Kanawha counties in the U.S. state of West Virginia. Jay Rockefeller's political affiliation with West Virginia began in 1964–1965 while he served as a VISTA volunteer in Emmons.

The community bears the name of the Emmons family.
