= Chauncey Browning Sr. =

American judge (1903–1971)

Justice of the Supreme Court of Appeals of West Virginia
- In office August 18, 1952 – June 24, 1971
- Preceded by: Fred L. Fox
- Succeeded by: John E. Carrigan

25th Attorney General of West Virginia
- In office February 1, 1952 – August 16, 1952
- Preceded by: William C. Marland
- Succeeded by: John G. Fox

Personal details
- Born: Chauncey Hoyt Browning; May 15, 1903
- Died: June 24, 1971 (aged 68)
- Party: Democratic
- Children: Chauncey H. Browning Jr.
- Occupation: Judge

Chauncey Hoyt Browning Sr. (May 15, 1903 – June 24, 1971) was Attorney General of West Virginia in 1952, and a justice of the Supreme Court of Appeals of West Virginia from August 18, 1952 until his death on June 24, 1971. Browning was a Democrat, from Logan County, West Virginia.

He was the father of West Virginia attorney general Chauncey H. Browning Jr.

He died of an apparent heart attack.

Legal offices
Preceded by William C. Marland	Attorney General of West Virginia; 1952	Succeeded by John G. Fox
Preceded by Fred L. Fox	Justice of the Supreme Court of Appeals of West Virginia; 1952–1971	Succeeded by John E. Carrigan
