= 1996 United States Senate election in West Virginia =

- November 5, 1996
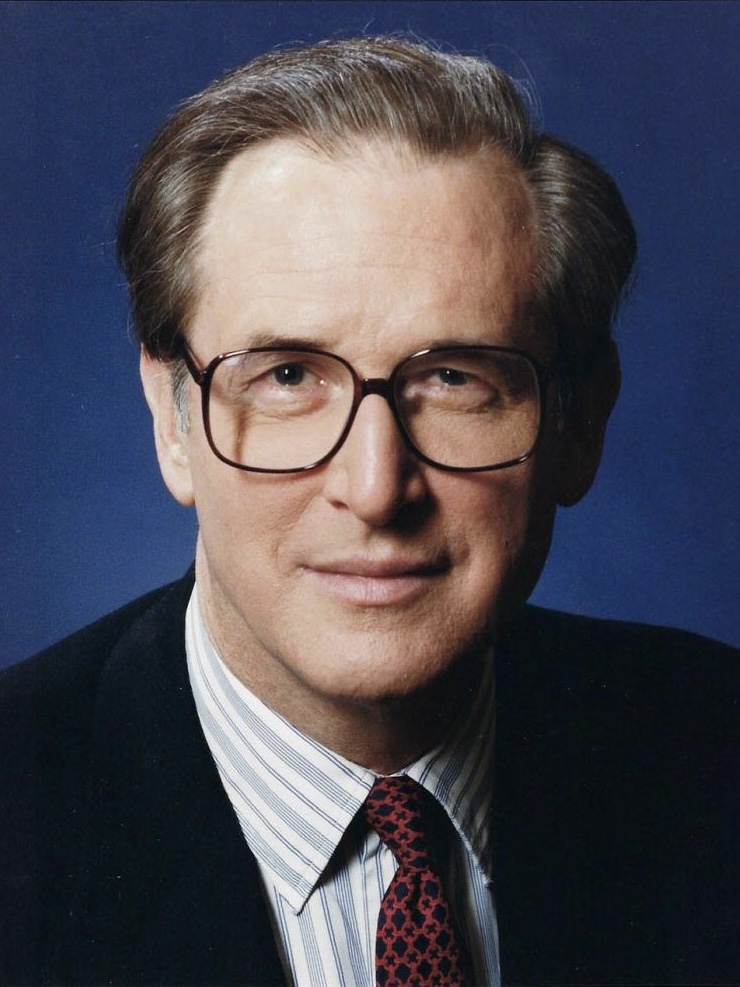

Nominee	Jay Rockefeller	Betty Burks
Party	Democratic	Republican
Popular vote	456,526	139,088
Percentage	76.65%	23.35%
- County results Rockefeller: 50–60% 60–70% 70–80% 80–90% >90%
U.S. senator before election
Jay Rockefeller
Democratic
Elected U.S. Senator
Jay Rockefeller
Democratic

The 1996 United States Senate election in West Virginia was held on November 5, 1996. Incumbent Democratic Senator Jay Rockefeller was re-elected by over three quarters of the vote to a third consecutive term. This was the best election performance of Rockefeller's career.

== Democratic primary ==
=== Candidates ===
- Bruce Barilla, Christian activist
- Jay Rockefeller, incumbent U.S. senator

=== Results ===
Democratic primary results
Party	Candidate	Votes	%
Democratic	Jay Rockefeller (incumbent)	280,303	88.44%
Democratic	Bruce Barilla	36,637	11.56%
Total votes		316,940	100.00%

== General election ==
=== Results ===
1996 United States Senate election in West Virginia
Party	Candidate	Votes	%	±%
Democratic	Jay Rockefeller (incumbent)	456,526	76.65%	+8.33
Republican	Betty Burks	139,088	23.35%	−8.33
Total votes		595,614	100.00%	N/A
Democratic hold				

== See also ==
- 1996 United States Senate elections
- 1996 West Virginia gubernatorial election
