= 1990 United States Senate election in West Virginia =

- November 6, 1990
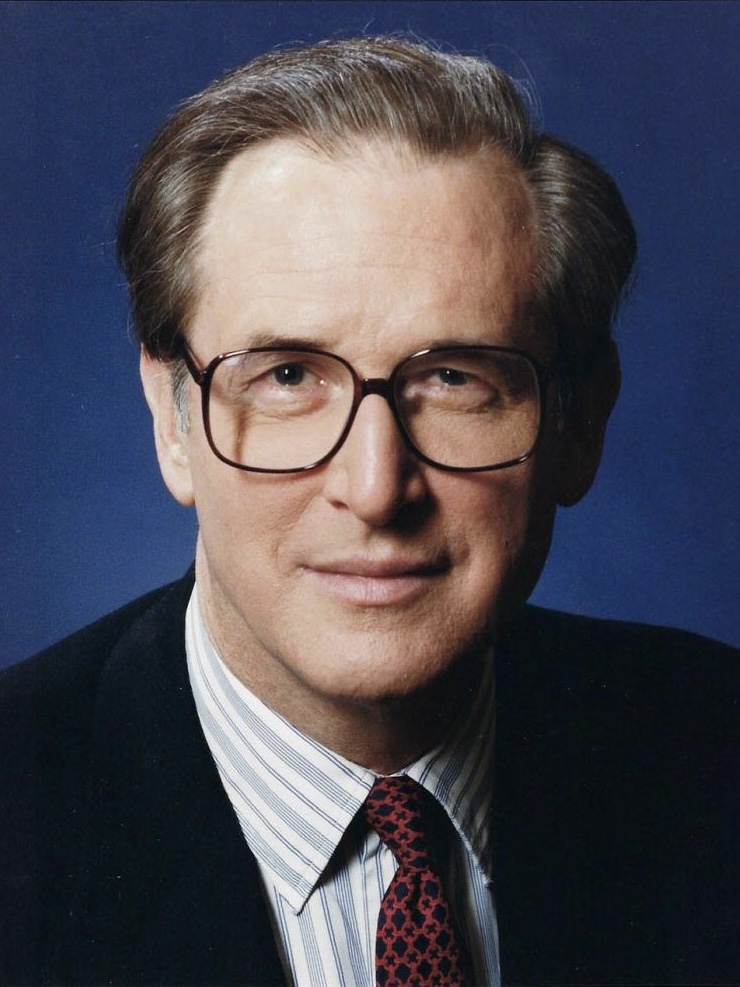

| Nominee | Jay Rockefeller | John C. Yoder |
| Party | Democratic | Republican |
| Popular vote | 276,234 | 128,071 |
| Percentage | 68.32% | 31.68% |
- County results Rockefeller: 50–60% 60–70% 70–80% 80–90% Yoder: 50–60%
U.S. senator before election
Jay Rockefeller
Democratic
Elected U.S. Senator
Jay Rockefeller
Democratic

The 1990 United States Senate election in West Virginia was held on November 6, 1990. Incumbent Democratic U.S. Senator Jay Rockefeller won re-election to a second term.

== Major candidates ==
=== Democratic ===
- Jay Rockefeller, incumbent U.S. Senator

=== Republican ===
- John C. Yoder, former Kansas District Court judge, former U.S. Supreme Court fellow

== Results ==
General election results
| Party | Candidate | Votes | % | ±% |
|---|---|---|---|---|
| Democratic | Jay Rockefeller (incumbent) | 276,234 | 68.32% | +16.50% |
| Republican | John C. Yoder | 128,071 | 31.68% | −16.05% |
| Total votes | | 404,305 | 100.00% | N/A |
| Democratic hold | | | | |

== See also ==
- 1990 United States Senate elections
