= Jay Wolfe =

American businessman and politician

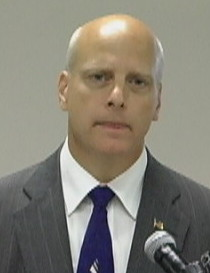

Member of the West Virginia Senate from the 13th district
- In office December 1, 1986 – December 1, 1990
- Succeeded by: Joseph M. Minard

Personal details
- Born: April 5, 1955 (age 71) Parkersburg, West Virginia, U.S.
- Party: Republican
- Spouse: Mollie Wolfe
- Education: Glenville State College
- Profession: Legislator, business owner

Jay Wolfe (born April 5, 1955) is an American business owner and former West Virginia state senator, and U.S. Senate candidate.

== Early life, education, and business career ==
Wolfe was born in Parkersburg, West Virginia to Donald and Emogene Moore Wolfe. He graduated from Parkersburg South High School in 1973. He attended Marshall University and graduated from Glenville State College in 1977 with a degree in business administration.

He owns Wolfe Rentals LLC and Wolfe-Furner Insurance Inc.

== Political career ==
In the 1980s, Wolfe was elected to one term in the West Virginia Senate. He was also a member of the Harrison County and state Republican executive committees.

=== 1988 U.S. Senate campaign ===
Wolfe lost to incumbent Democrat Robert C. Byrd, but his 35.2% of the vote was the highest percentage that any of Byrd's opponents had scored since his first Senate win in 1958 over Chapman Revercomb (who received 40.8% that year). Byrd outspent Wolfe by $3 million to $200,000.

=== 2002 U.S. Senate campaign ===
Wolfe lost to incumbent Democrat Jay Rockefeller, receiving 36.9% of the vote. Rockefeller outspent Wolfe by $5 million to $150,000.

=== 2008 U.S. Senate campaign ===
Wolfe lost a rematch with Rockefeller by a nearly identical margin (he received 36.3% of the vote), but with Rockefeller spending more than he did in 2002.

== Electoral history ==
West Virginia United States Senate election, 1988
Party	Candidate	Votes	%	±%
Democratic	Robert Byrd (inc.)	410,983	64.8%	
Republican	Jay Wolfe	223,564	35.2%	
Majority				
Turnout				
Democratic hold		Swing		

West Virginia U.S. Senate Election, 2002
Party	Candidate	Votes	%	±%
Democratic	Jay Rockefeller	275,281	63.11	−13.54
Republican	Jay Wolfe	160,902	36.89	+13.54
Majority		114,379	26.22	−27.08
Turnout		436,183		
Democratic hold				

United States Senate election in West Virginia, 2008
Party	Candidate	Votes	%	±%
Democratic	Jay Rockefeller	447,560	63.7	+0.6
Republican	Jay Wolfe	254,629	36.3	−0.6
Majority		192,931		
Turnout		702,189		
Democratic hold		Swing		

== Personal life ==
Wolfe married his high school girlfriend, Mollie. They have been married for over 40 years. He has four children and ten grandchildren.

Party political offices
Preceded by Cleve Benedict	Republican nominee for U.S. Senator from West Virginia (Class 1); 1988	Succeeded by Stanley L. Klos
Preceded by Betty Burks	Republican nominee for U.S. Senator from West Virginia (Class 2); 2002, 2008	Succeeded by Shelley Moore Capito
