= Clyde See =

American politician (1941–2017)

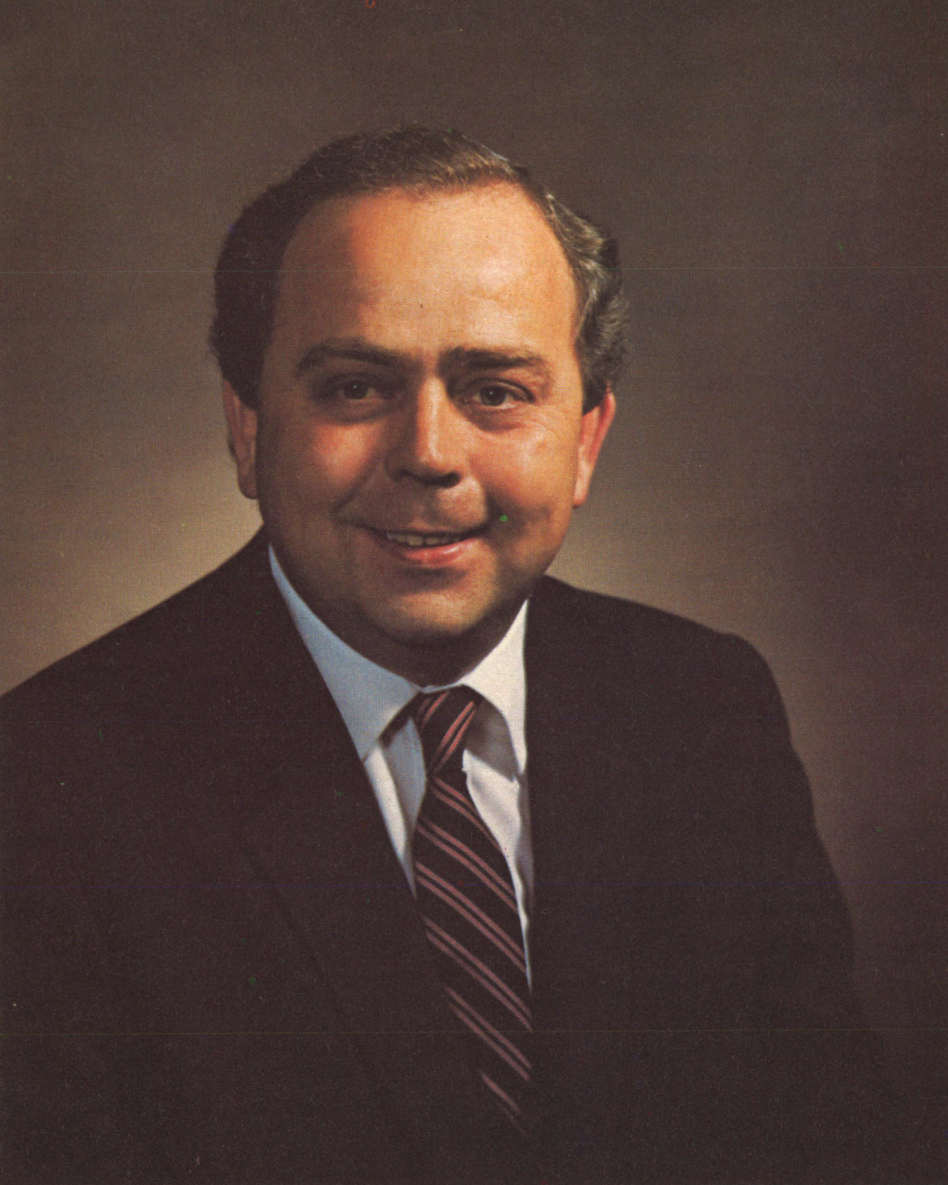

48th Speaker of the West Virginia House of Delegates
- In office 1979–1985
- Preceded by: Donald L. Kopp
- Succeeded by: Joseph Albright

Member of the West Virginia House of Delegates
- In office 1974–1985

Personal details
- Born: Clyde McNeill See Jr. October 20, 1941 Hardy County, West Virginia, U.S.
- Died: April 6, 2017 (aged 75) Moorefield, West Virginia, U.S.
- Party: Democratic
- Spouse: Judith Robinson
- Education: West Virginia University

Military service
- Allegiance: United States
- Branch/service: United States Army

Clyde McNeill See Jr. (October 20, 1941 – April 6, 2017) was an American politician and lawyer from West Virginia. See served as Speaker of the West Virginia House of Delegates from 1979 to 1985 and was the Democratic nominee for Governor of West Virginia in 1984, a race he lost to Republican Arch Moore.

== Early life ==
Born in Hardy County, West Virginia, See dropped out of high school. He joined the United States Army and received his GED after serving in the United States Army. He received his bachelor's degree from West Virginia University and his law degree from West Virginia University College of Law. He practiced law in Hardy County and lived in Old Fields, West Virginia.

== Political career ==
See served as a Democrat in the West Virginia House of Delegates from 1974 to 1985, where he was noted for his rapid rise in the ranks of House leadership, serving as vice-chairman of the House Judiciary Committee in his first term and becoming Majority Leader in his second term. See was elected Speaker of the House in his third term and served in the position for six years, from 1979 to 1985. See also ran for election for Governor of West Virginia in 1984 and 1988 and lost both elections.

== Death ==
See died at his home in Moorefield, West Virginia from cancer in 2017. The Speaker Clyde See Jr. Exit on Corridor H in Moorefield is named in his honor.

== Election results ==
=== Primary election ===
West Virginia Democratic gubernatorial primary, 1984
| Party | Candidate | Votes | % |
|---|---|---|---|
| Democratic | Clyde M. See Jr. | 148,049 | 39.84 |
| Democratic | Warren McGraw | 104,138 | 28.02 |
| Democratic | Chauncey H. Browning Jr. | 101,712 | 27.37 |
| Democratic | Dusty Rhodes | 7,581 | 2.04 |
| Democratic | Glenn W. Mullett | 5,234 | 1.41 |
| Democratic | Powell Lane | 2,935 | 0.79 |
| Democratic | E. E. Cumptan | 1,960 | 0.53 |
| Total votes | | 371,609 | 100 |

West Virginia Democratic gubernatorial primary, 1988
| Party | Candidate | Votes | % |
|---|---|---|---|
| Democratic | Gaston Caperton | 132,435 | 37.96 |
| Democratic | Clyde M. See Jr. | 94,364 | 27.05 |
| Democratic | Mario Palumbo | 51,722 | 14.83 |
| Democratic | Gus Douglass | 48,748 | 13.97 |
| Democratic | Dan R. Tonkovich | 14,916 | 4.28 |
| Democratic | Larry Harless | 5,217 | 1.50 |
| Democratic | Paul Nuchims | 1,484 | 0.43 |
| Total votes | | 348,886 | 100 |

=== General election ===
West Virginia gubernatorial election, 1984
| Party | Candidate | Votes | % |
|---|---|---|---|
| Republican | Arch A. Moore Jr. | 394,937 | 53.26 |
| Democratic | Clyde M. See Jr. | 346,565 | 46.74 |
| Total votes | | 741,502 | 100 |
| Republican gain from Democratic | | | |

== Notes ==
Party political offices
| Preceded by Jay Rockefeller | Democratic nominee for Governor of West Virginia; 1984 | Succeeded by Gaston Caperton |
