= East Tennessee Natural Gas Co. v. Sage =

2004 eminent domain court case

East Tenn. Gas Pipeline Co. v. Sage
- Court: United States Court of Appeals for the Fourth Circuit
- Argued: September 25 2003
- Decided: March 22 2004
- Citation: 361 F.3d 808 (4th Cir. 2004)

Case history
- Appealed from: Western District of Virginia
- Subsequent history: eh'g en banc denied, 369 F.3d 357 (2004), cert. denied, 543 U.S. 978 (2004)

Court membership
- Judges sitting: M. Blane Michael, Paul V. Niemeyer, Diana Gribbon Motz

Case opinions
- Majority: Michael, joined by Niemeyer, Motz

East Tennessee Natural Gas Co. v. Sage, 361 F.3d 808 (4th Cir. 2004), cert. denied, 543 U.S. 978 (2004), is a seminal case in which the United States Court of Appeals for the Fourth Circuit held that a gas company using its powers of eminent domain under the Natural Gas Act can obtain immediate possession by satisfying the requirements for a preliminary injunction. This process effectively permits the condemning company to use a "quick take" procedure.

Since the publication of Sage, five other circuits have followed its reasoning. In 2019, the Fourth Circuit upheld Sage in a case involving the Mountain Valley Pipeline.

== Background ==
=== FERC Certificate ===
Section 7 of the Natural Gas Act of 1938 (NGA) provides the Federal Energy Regulatory Commission (FERC) with the authority to permit the construction of interstate natural gas pipelines. Congress amended the NGA in 1947 to authorize companies with a FERC-issued certification of public convenience and necessity the right to exercise eminent domain in order to acquire necessary right-of-ways.This use of eminent domain is conditioned on a company's inability to acquire right-of-ways through negotiation with property owners.

To get a FERC certificate, a gas company must file an application with the agency demonstrating that its pipeline was required by public convenience and necessity. A United States Supreme Court case indicated that FERC's review of that application must include "all matters relevant to the public interest." (Note: Citing Atlantic Ref. Co. v. Pub. Serv. Comm'n of N.Y., 360 U.S. 378 (1959).) The application process is rigorous but almost always ended in a certification being granted. Once FERC issues the certification, the company has the power of eminent domain but does not have the authority to immediately enter condemned property.

=== Court jurisdiction and eminent domain ===
The NGA delegates jurisdiction over Section 7 eminent domain condemnations to federal courts. To succeed on its condemnation of right-of-way easements, the pipeline must show that: (1) it obtained a FERC certificate of public convenience and necessity; (2) it tried but failed to acquire the substantive rights required to construct the pipeline; and (3) the property sought has a value of more than $3,000.

The NGA's statement that the procedure in any condemnation action pursuant to the NGA shall use state procedural law was superseded by Federal Rule of Civil Procedure 71A.

=== Equity ===
In Guaranty Trust Co. v. York (1945), the Supreme Court required federal courts to apply a uniform body of equitable principles derived from the English common law. A court, under its powers in equity, may enter injunctions.

== Facts and procedural history ==
East Tennessee Natural Gas, a subsidiary of Duke Energy, received approval by FERC to build a ninety-four miles long pipeline in Virginia, North Carolina, and Tennessee on November 20, 2002. The company was required by its FERC certificate to complete construction and have the pipeline in service by January 1, 2005. The certificate also required the company to satisfy sixty-nine conditions including mitigation measures described in the applicable environmental impact statement.

In December 2002, having failed to negotiate easements for over eighty tracts, East Tennessee Natural Gas sought orders of condemnation in the Western District of Virginia. Simultaneously, the gas company also filed motions for immediate possession in order to prevent construction delays.Because the NGA is silent as to the question of immediate possession, the company asked the district court to use its "inherent equitable power" to grant the relief sought.

The district court considered the issues in stages, starting first by granting the gas company's right to condemn the easements, and then granting its motions for immediate possession almost a month later using the court's equitable powers. For the immediate possession motions, the district court used the preliminary injunction test in a now-overruled Fourth Circuit case, Blackwelder Furniture Co. of Statesville v. Seilig. The court found that the Blackwelder standard was satisfied because delaying possession until after a determination for just compensation would result in extended delay, which in turn would cause significant financial harm to the gas company and its potential customers. Further, the court found that there was little harm to the landowners because they could draw money from the money the gas company was required to deposit with the court. Moreover, the court concluded that a swift completion of the pipeline was in the public interest.

The landowners appealed to the Fourth Circuit, conceding that the gas company had a legal right to take the easements, but challenging the decision to grant the preliminary injunctions prior to determinations of just compensation.

== Opinion of the court ==
=== Acknowledgement that the NGA and FRCP 71A were silent on the issue ===
The court started its analysis by recognizing that neither the NGA nor Federal Rule of Civil Procedure 71A say anything about early possession of condemned land. After looking at Rule 71A's legislative history, the court concluded that it contained no language prohibiting condemnors from pursuing other available procedures to "possession prior to the entry of final judgment." Because the federal rules of civil procedure apply when Rule 71A is silent, the court concluded that a condemnor could seek a preliminary injunction under Federal Rule of Civil Procedure 65(a).

=== Recognizing that condemnation orders constitute substantive rights ===
The court upheld the district court's determination that the gas company had a substantive right to condemn the property in question. Specifically, the Fourth Circuit held that the district court's orders establishing the company's right to condemn the properties as outlined in its FERC certificate, constituted an interest in the landowners' property capable of being protected in equity. Thus, after a determination on the issue of the company's right to condemn was made, the court could consider whether the company's request for immediate possession met the standards for a preliminary injunction. This determination, that a property interest "distinct from legal ownership"

=== Holding that the general principles of equity do not bar immediate possession ===
The court denied the petitioners' argument that general principles of equity were inapplicable "because equitable relief in the form of immediate possession is barred in a condemnation case." The court cited a Supreme Court case, Cherokee Nation v. South Kansas Railway Co., stating that the Constitution does not require the provision of just compensation in condemnation cases prior to occupancy. Because Rule 71A required the company to deposit a bond with the court equal to the appraised value of the easements condemned, and the company had reported earnings of over $1 billion in 2002, the court found there to be adequate assurance of future just compensation.

The court then pointed to congressional acquiescence in the use of Rule 65(a) in an NGA condemnation as evidence that the rule applied. Further, the court rejected the petitioners' argument that, because statutes granting condemnation powers are to be strictly construed, equity could not be invoked by pointing to prior Fourth Circuit precedent.

Because the Supreme Court stated in 1937 that courts of equity could go to greater lengths to give "relief in furtherance of the public interest than they are accustomed to go when only private interests are involved," and because there was a substantial public interest—the need for natural gas—the court found another reason why it was appropriate for the court to use its powers in equity. (Note: Citing Va. Ry. Co. v. Sys. Fed'n No. 40, 300 U.S. 515, 552, 57 S.Ct. 592, 81 L.Ed. 789 (1937).) The court later stated that the natural gas supply to areas of southern Virginia with little or no service made the issuance of preliminary injunction orders, "especially appropriate."

By allowing the court to use its powers in equity, the court effectively created a "quick take" procedure for condemning companies using eminent domain powers under the NGA.

=== Holding that the gas company met the requirements for a preliminary injunction ===
The Fourth Circuit rejected the petitioners' alternative argument that the gas company did not meet the requirements for a preliminary injunction.

==== Irreparable harm analysis ====
For the showing of irreparable harm to the gas company, the Fourth Circuit was satisfied by the district court's findings that if denied the preliminary injunction, the company would:

- suffer financially from "undue delay";
- be required to go through a "wasteful and inefficient" process if it had to skip a parcel and come back later;
- fail to complete the construction and operation requirements set out in its FERC certification;
- be forced to breach contracts obligating it to provide natural gas to several electricity plants and gas utilities, which would in turn hurt the customers those plants and utilities served;
- lose "in excess of $5 million."

Moreover, the fact that a delay in pipeline construction "would hinder economic development effects in several Virginia counties" was of note to the Fourth Circuit.

==== Other factors ====
As for the other three factors, even in light of a more searching review due to the presence of a mandatory preliminary injunction, the court concluded the district court's analysis was sound, stating:

First, ETNG's right to take the easements for the Patriot Project is indisputably clear, as the district court determined. Second, a federal agency, FERC, determined that the project is necessary to serve the public interest, specifically, the public need for natural gas in areas that have no gas service or that are underserved. To assure that these needs are met in good time, FERC has ordered ETNG to complete the project by January 1, 2005. Third, ETNG could not meet FERC's deadline without immediate possession. And without this mandatory relief, ETNG would face other irreparable harm such as increased construction costs and losses from its breach of gas supply contracts. Preliminary injunctive relief of a mandatory nature was therefore appropriate in these cases.

== Effect and scholarly attention ==
Sage is considered the most comprehensive judicial discussion on immediate entry and a seminal decision. Since its publication, a number of articles have been written about the case.

=== Followed by other circuit courts ===
Following the denial by the Supreme Court to grant certiorari to address the issue in Sage, courts of appeal in five separate circuits have followed the Sage approach. The courts established their respective approaches in the following cases:

- Transcon. Gas Pipe Line Co. v. Permanent Easements for 2.14 Acres, 907 F.3d 725, 734–35 (3d Cir. 2018);
- Nexus Gas Transmission, LLC v. City of Green, 757 F. App’x 489, 491 (6th Cir. 2018);
- All. Pipeline L.P. v. 4.360 Acres of Land, 746 F.3d 362, 365 (8th Cir. 2014);
- Transwestern Pipeline Co. v. 17.19 Acres, 550 F.3d 770, 776–77 (9th Cir. 2008);
- Transcon. Gas Pipe Line Co. v. 6.04 Acres, 910 F.3d 1130, 1147–48 (11th Cir. 2018).

Four circuits have yet to follow Sage or address the issue: the First, Second, Fifth, and Tenth circuits.

=== Circuit split ===
Only the Seventh Circuit, in an opinion predating Sage, has held that courts could not exercise equitable relief to provide gas companies with immediate possession. (Note: Citing; N. Border Pipeline Co. v. 86.72 Acres of Land, 144 F.3d 469, 470 (7th Cir. 1998).) However, scholars have debated whether that case, Northern Border Pipeline Co. v. 86. 72 Acres of Land, is incompatible with Sage. On one hand, it has been argued that the Northern Border case set a high bar for what substantive right a NGA condemnor needs to be granted immediate possession. However, it has also been argued that the difference in substantive right strength required by the Seventh Circuit was due to the fact that the gas company in that case immediately sought the right to possess without first seeking summary judgment.

=== Mountain Valley Pipeline v. 6.56 Acres of Land, 915 F.3d 198 (2019) ===
In 2019, landowners in a case called Mountain Valley Pipeline v. 6.56 Acres argued that the Fourth Circuit should overrule Sage because the Natural Gas Act does not allow for immediate possession. The Fourth Circuit upheld Sage and the Supreme Court later denied the landowner's petition for writ of certiorari.
