= John C. Yoder =

American politician

Judge of 23rd Circuit Court of West Virginia
- In office January 1, 2009 – June 9, 2017

Member of the West Virginia Senate from the 16th district
- In office January 12, 2005 – January 14, 2009 Serving with John Unger
- Preceded by: Herb Snyder
- Succeeded by: Herb Snyder
- In office January 13, 1993 – January 8, 1997
- Succeeded by: Herb Snyder

Personal details
- Born: January 9, 1951 Newton, Kansas, U.S.
- Died: June 9, 2017 (aged 66) U.S.
- Party: Republican
- Spouse: T. Irene Sanders (1983-1991)

John C. Yoder (January 9, 1951 – June 9, 2017) was an American lawyer, business entrepreneur, West Virginia State Senator and West Virginia Circuit Court Judge.

== Biography ==
Born in Newton, Kansas, Yoder received his B.A, degree from Chapman College and his J.D. degree from the University of Kansas School of Law. Yoder also received his master's degree in business administration (MBA) from the University of Chicago. At 26 years old Yoder won an election against a much older incumbent judge and served as a Kansas District Court judge from 1976 to 1980—Yoder was the youngest person ever elected as judge in the United States.

Yoder was selected and served 1980-1981 as a judicial fellow with the United States Supreme Court and subsequently served (1981-1983) as special assistant to the Chief Justice (Burger) of the United States Supreme Court. He then served (1983-1984), at the appointment of President Ronald Reagan, as the first director of the Asset Forfeiture Office within the United States Department of Justice. In 2014, Yoder and Brad Cates, who served as director following Yoder, wrote an op-ed published in the Washington Post,in which they said about the asset forfeiture program they created, "The program began with good intentions but having failed in both purpose and execution, it should be abolished....It is unreformable."

Yoder lived in Harpers Ferry, West Virginia. In 1990 Yoder ran as the Republican nominee for the U.S. Senate against incumbent Democratic U.S. Senator Jay Rockefeller and lost the election, but received a higher percentage of votes than any other candidate running against an incumbent that year. From 1992 to 1996 and from 2004 to 2008, Yoder served in the West Virginia State Senate and was a Republican. Yoder was also a practicing attorney and business entrepreneur. In 2010, Yoder was elected to the West Virginia Circuit Court and was re-elected in 2016 and was serving on the court at the time of his death.

In 2012, Yoder ran for a seat on the West Virginia Supreme Court and lost the election. However, by running in statewide elections (1990 and 2012) while residing in the eastern panhandle of West Virginia, Yoder opened the door for other statewide candidates from the easternmost counties of WV.

Yoder died June 9, 2017, of complications following a second surgery to replace his aortic heart valve which was first replaced in 2012.

== Notes ==
Party political offices
Preceded by John Raese	Republican nominee for U.S. Senator from West Virginia (Class 2); 1990	Succeeded by Betty Burks
