= 2002 United States Senate election in West Virginia =

- November 5, 2002
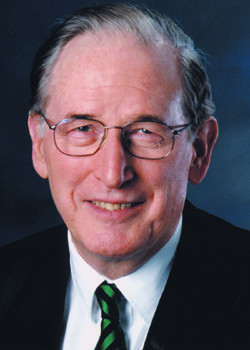

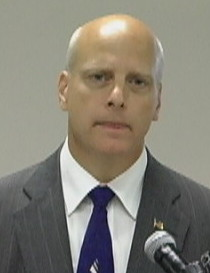
Nominee	Jay Rockefeller	Jay Wolfe
Party	Democratic	Republican
Popular vote	275,281	160,902
Percentage	63.11%	36.89%
- County results Rockefeller: 50–60% 60–70% 70–80% 80–90% Wolfe: 50–60% 60–70%
U.S. senator before election
Jay Rockefeller
Democratic
Elected U.S. Senator
Jay Rockefeller
Democratic

The 2002 United States Senate election in West Virginia was held on November 5. Incumbent Democratic U.S. Senator Jay Rockefeller won re-election to a fourth term, defeating Republican Jay Wolfe.

This was one of the six Democratic-held Senate seats up for election in a state that George W. Bush won in the 2000 presidential election.

== Major candidates ==
=== Democratic ===
- Jay Rockefeller, incumbent U.S. Senator

=== Republican ===
- Jay Wolfe, State Senator and nominee for U.S. Senate for 1988

== Campaign ==
Wolfe ran a Grassroots campaign. Rockefeller was the heavy favorite. Rockefeller had $2.9 million cash on hand to Wolfe at $100,536 (In mid-October). Wolfe was endorsed by President George W. Bush and the National Rifle Association of America, but it wasn't enough to make the election competitive.

=== Predictions ===
Source	Ranking	As of
Sabato's Crystal Ball	Safe D	November 4, 2002

== Results ==
2002 United States Senate election in West Virginia
Party	Candidate	Votes	%	±%
Democratic	Jay Rockefeller (incumbent)	275,281	63.11%	−13.54%
Republican	Jay Wolfe	160,902	36.89%	+13.54%
Total votes		436,183	100.00%	N/A
Democratic hold				

=== Counties that flipped from Democratic to Republican ===
- Doddridge (largest municipality: West Union)
- Morgan (largest municipality: Berkeley Springs)
- Grant (largest municipality: Petersburg)
- Ritchie (largest municipality: Harrisville)

== See also ==
- 2002 United States Senate elections
