= Chauncey H. Browning Jr. =

American attorney and politician (1934–2010)

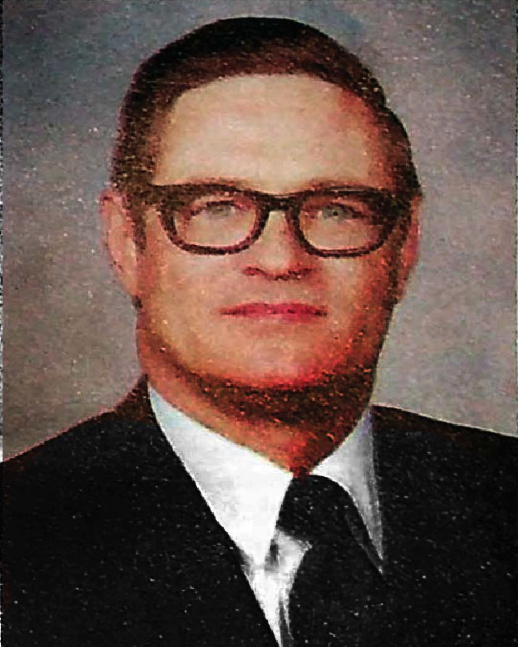

29th Attorney General of West Virginia
- In office January 13, 1969 – January 14, 1985
- Governor: Arch A. Moore Jr.; Jay Rockefeller
- Preceded by: C. Donald Robertson
- Succeeded by: Charlie Brown

Personal details
- Born: Chauncey Hoyt Browning Jr. November 21, 1934 Charleston, West Virginia, United States
- Died: January 1, 2010 (aged 75) Charleston, West Virginia, United States
- Party: Democratic
- Parent: Chauncey Browning Sr. (father)
- Education: West Virginia University (BA, LLB)
- Occupation: Lawyer; politician

Chauncey Hoyt Browning Jr. (November 21, 1934 – January 1, 2010) was an American attorney and politician. A Democrat from West Virginia, he was elected four times as West Virginia Attorney General, serving from 1969 to 1985.

Browning was born in Charleston in 1934, the son of Chauncey Browning Sr. and Evelyn Mahone Browning. He received his Bachelor of Arts degree from West Virginia University in 1956. He attended the West Virginia University College of Law, serving as the editor-in-chief of West Virginia Law Review, receiving his law degree in 1958. Following graduation, Browning served as a law clerk to Judge Benjamin Franklin Moore of the United States District Court for the Southern District of West Virginia. He engaged in the practice of law in Charleston and subsequently served as the state Commissioner of Public Institutions.

Browning was elected Attorney General in 1968 and re-elected in 1972, 1976 and 1980. He was the first Attorney General to serve four terms in West Virginia's history. He is also the only West Virginia Attorney General to have served as president of the National Association of Attorneys General.

During his tenure, Browning established the Consumer Protection Division and reviewed and revised environmental and natural resources laws, rules and regulations. Also during his tenure, West Virginia sued the Pittston Coal Company for $100 million in damages for the February 26, 1972 Buffalo Creek Flood. Governor Arch A. Moore Jr. later settled the suit for $1 million.

Browning did not seek re-election in 1984, but rather ran for governor and lost a hotly contested three-way primary and left office in January 1985. He returned to his private practice and retired in 2008. Browning died on January 1, 2010, at Charleston Area Medical Center at 75.

Party political offices
Preceded by C. Donald Robertson	Democratic nominee for West Virginia Attorney General; 1968, 1972, 1976, 1980	Succeeded by Charlie Brown
Legal offices
Preceded by C. Donald Robertson	Attorney General of West Virginia; 1969–1985	Succeeded by Charlie Brown
