= 1972 West Virginia gubernatorial election =

- November 7, 1972
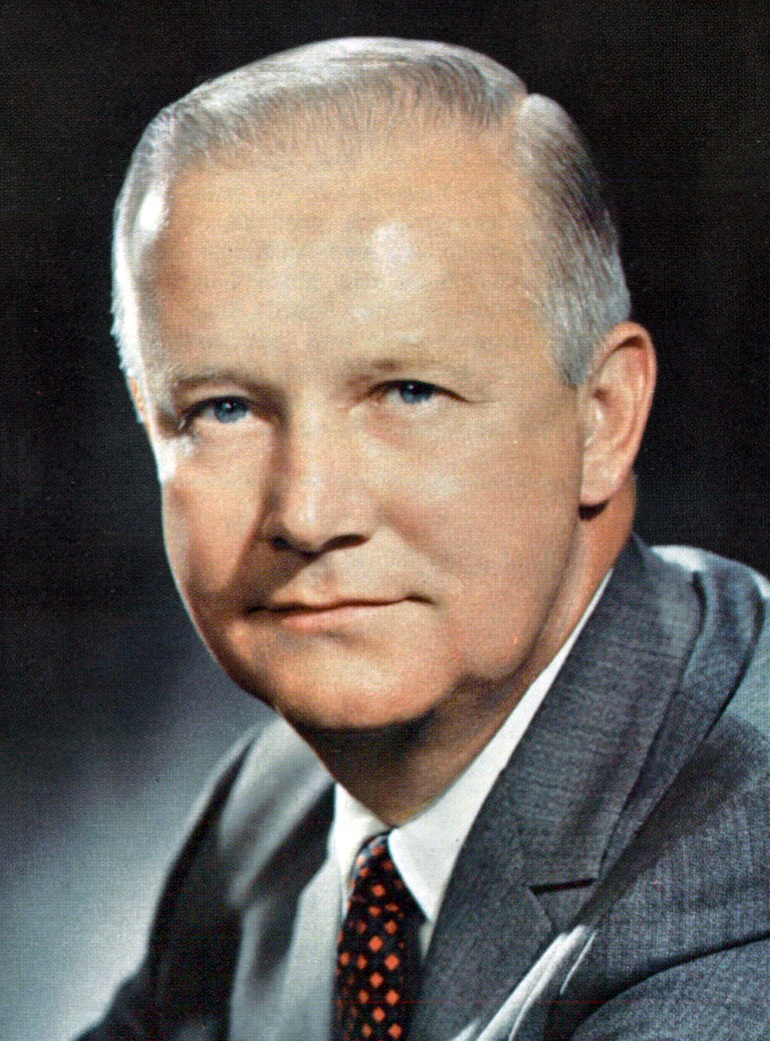

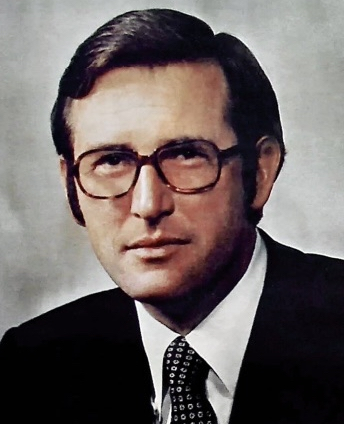
Nominee	Arch A. Moore Jr.	Jay Rockefeller
Party	Republican	Democratic
Popular vote	423,817	350,462
Percentage	54.74%	45.26%
- County results Moore: 50–60% 60–70% 70–80% Rockefeller: 50–60%
Governor before election
Arch A. Moore Jr.
Republican
Elected Governor
Arch A. Moore Jr.
Republican

The 1972 West Virginia gubernatorial election took place on November 7, 1972, to elect the governor of West Virginia. Incumbent governor Arch A. Moore, Jr. successfully ran for reelection to a second term. This was the first time a governor was reelected to a second four-year term in state history, and the first time a governor had been reelected since 1872.

Both the primaries and general election were held in the aftermath of the Buffalo Creek flood and a movement to abolish strip mining in the state. Democratic nominee Jay Rockefeller campaigned on a proposal to abolish strip mining entirely if elected.

== Democratic primary ==
=== Candidates ===
- Lee Mountcastle Kenna, Kanawha County assessor and founder of the Sunrise Museum
- Bobbie Edward Myers, Huntington businessman
- Jay Rockefeller, West Virginia secretary of state and member of the Rockefeller family

=== Results ===
1972 West Virginia Democratic gubernatorial primary
Party	Candidate	Votes	%
Democratic	Jay Rockefeller	262,613	72.20%
Democratic	Lee M. Kenna	63,514	17.46%
Democratic	Bobbie Edward Myers	37,616	10.34%
Total votes		363,743	100.00%

== General election ==
=== Results ===
1972 West Virginia gubernatorial election
Party	Candidate	Votes	%
Republican	Arch A. Moore, Jr. (incumbent)	423,817	54.74
Democratic	Jay Rockefeller	350,462	45.26
Total votes		774,279	100
Republican hold			
