= James Marshall Sprouse =

American judge (1923–2004)

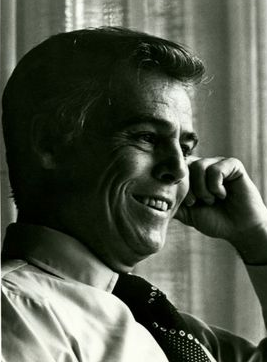

Senior Judge of the United States Court of Appeals for the Fourth Circuit
- In office October 31, 1992 – July 31, 1995

Judge of the United States Court of Appeals for the Fourth Circuit
- In office September 13, 1979 – October 31, 1992
- Appointed by: Jimmy Carter
- Preceded by: Seat established by 92 Stat. 1629
- Succeeded by: M. Blane Michael

Justice of the Supreme Court of Appeals of West Virginia
- In office January 1, 1973 – June 27, 1975
- Preceded by: John E. Carrigan
- Succeeded by: Edwin F. Flowers

Personal details
- Born: James Marshall Sprouse; December 3, 1923 Williamson, West Virginia, U.S.
- Died: July 3, 2004 (aged 80) Charleston, West Virginia, U.S.
- Education: St. Bonaventure University (AB); Columbia Law School (LLB); University of Bordeaux

James Marshall Sprouse (December 3, 1923 – July 3, 2004) was a United States circuit judge of the United States Court of Appeals for the Fourth Circuit.

== Education and career ==
He was born in Williamson, West Virginia and graduated from Williamson High School in 1941. He was in the United States Army from 1942 to 1945 and served as a private in the Intelligence and Reconnaissance Platoon of the 104th Infantry Division in the European theatre of World War II.

He received an Artium Baccalaureus degree from St. Bonaventure University in 1947 and a Bachelor of Laws from Columbia Law School in 1949. He was an assistant state attorney general of West Virginia in 1949. He was a Fulbright Scholar in international law at the University of Bordeaux in France in 1950. He was counsel for the Displaced Persons Commission from 1950 to 1951. He was in private practice in West Virginia from 1951 to 1952. He was with the Central Intelligence Agency from 1952 to 1957. He was in private practice in West Virginia from 1957 to 1972. He ran for Governor of West Virginia in 1968, narrowly winning the Democratic nomination, but lost the general election to Republican congressman Arch A. Moore Jr. He was a justice of the West Virginia Supreme Court of Appeals from 1972 to 1975 when he resigned to make a second run for governor, losing the Democratic primary to Jay Rockefeller. He was in private practice in West Virginia from 1975 to 1979.

== Federal judicial service ==
Sprouse was nominated by President Jimmy Carter on July 5, 1979, to the United States Court of Appeals for the Fourth Circuit, to a new seat created by 92 Stat. 1629. He was confirmed by the United States Senate on September 11, 1979, and received his commission on September 13, 1979. He assumed senior status on October 31, 1992. His service was terminated on July 31, 1995, due to retirement.

== Later Political Activity ==
After his retirement from the bench, Judge Sprouse became very active in West Virginia gubernatorial politics once more. He initially in the primary chaired, then in the general election co-chaired, the gubernatorial campaign of State Senator Charlotte Pritt in her historic bid for governor. Pritt, a fellow progressive like Sprouse, was the first woman nominated by a major party for governor of the state. She narrowly lost the General Election.

== Death ==
Sprouse died on July 3, 2004, in Charleston, West Virginia.

== Sources ==
Party political offices
Preceded by Hulett C. Smith	Democratic Party nominee for Governor of West Virginia; 1968	Succeeded by Jay Rockefeller
Legal offices
Preceded by Seat established by 92 Stat. 1629	Judge of the United States Court of Appeals for the Fourth Circuit; 1979–1992	Succeeded by M. Blane Michael
