= John E. Carrigan =

American judge (1910–1984)

John E. Carrigan (August 25, 1910 – February 21, 1984) was a justice of the Supreme Court of Appeals of West Virginia from July 13, 1971 to December 31, 1972.

== Biography ==
Born in Sherrard, West Virginia, Carrigan graduated from West Virginia University and served in the United States Navy. He was elected as a Republican to the West Virginia Senate in 1950, and became Senate Minority Leader in 1955, serving in that position until 1971. On July 13, 1971, Governor Arch A. Moore Jr. appointed Carrigan to a seat on the West Virginia Supreme Court vacated by the death of Chauncey Browning Sr.; Moore and Carrigan had grown up in the same town, and known each other since youth, as well as serving in the state senate together. Moore's appointment of Carrigan as the only Republican on the court "brought praise from Democrats and Republicans", and Moore indicated that he would run for election to the seat the following year. However, he was defeated in that bid by Democrat James Marshall Sprouse.

== Work with Governor Moore ==
Governor Moore then named Carrigan as his liaison to the 1973 state legislature. In 1976, Carrigan represented Moore in an unsuccessful lawsuit to allow Moore to run for a third consecutive term as governor, despite the existence of a two-term limit in the state constitution.

Political offices
Preceded by Chauncey Browning Sr.	Justice of the Supreme Court of Appeals of West Virginia; 1971–1972	Succeeded by James Marshall Sprouse
