= Jack L. Pauley =

American politician (born 1938)

Member of the West Virginia House of Delegates from Kanawha County
- In office 1964–1966

Personal details
- Born: November 30, 1938 (age 87)
- Party: Democratic
- Education: Morris Harvey College; Marshall University

Jack L. Pauley (born November 30, 1938) is an American politician. He served as a Democratic member of the West Virginia House of Delegates.

== Life and career ==
Pauley attended Morris Harvey College and Marshall University.

Pauley was a teacher.

In 1964, Pauley was elected to the West Virginia House of Delegates.
