= Jay Rockefeller =

American politician (1937–2026)

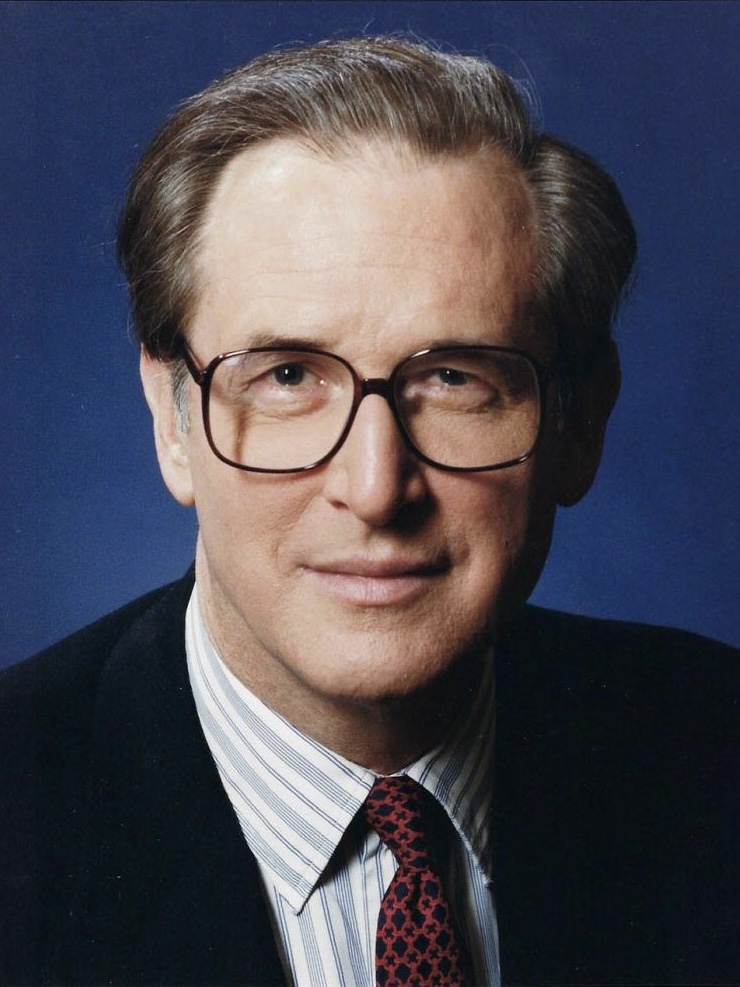
- Official portrait, 1993

United States Senator from West Virginia
- In office January 15, 1985 – January 3, 2015
- Preceded by: Jennings Randolph
- Succeeded by: Shelley Moore Capito
Senate positions
Chair of the Senate Commerce Committee
In office January 3, 2009 – January 3, 2015
| Preceded by | Daniel Inouye |
| Succeeded by | John Thune |
Chair of the Senate Intelligence Committee
In office January 3, 2007 – January 3, 2009
| Preceded by | Pat Roberts |
| Succeeded by | Dianne Feinstein |
Ranking Member of the Senate Intelligence Committee
In office January 3, 2003 – January 3, 2007
| Preceded by | Richard Shelby |
| Succeeded by | Kit Bond |
Chair of the Senate Veterans' Affairs Committee
In office June 6, 2001 – January 3, 2003
| Preceded by | Arlen Specter |
| Succeeded by | Arlen Specter |
In office January 3, 2001 – January 20, 2001
| Preceded by | Arlen Specter |
| Succeeded by | Arlen Specter |
In office January 3, 1993 – January 3, 1995
| Preceded by | Alan Cranston |
| Succeeded by | Alan Simpson |
Ranking Member of the Senate Veterans' Affairs Committee
In office January 3, 1995 – January 3, 2001
| Preceded by | Alan Simpson |
| Succeeded by | Arlen Specter |

29th Governor of West Virginia
- In office January 17, 1977 – January 14, 1985
- Preceded by: Arch A. Moore Jr.
- Succeeded by: Arch A. Moore Jr.

22nd Secretary of State of West Virginia
- In office January 13, 1969 – January 15, 1973
- Governor: Arch A. Moore Jr.
- Preceded by: Robert D. Bailey Jr.
- Succeeded by: Hike Heiskell

Member of the West Virginia House of Delegates from Kanawha County
- In office December 1, 1966 – December 1, 1968
- Preceded by: 12 members: Jesse Barker; J. F. Bedell; Thomas Black; Pat Board; Kelly Castleberry; Kenneth Coghill; Charles Dunaway; James Kessinger; Thomas Knight; James Loop; Jack L. Pauley; Fred Scott
- Succeeded by: 4 members: Dempsey Gibson; Phillis Rutledge; Sam Savilla; Harlan Wilson

Personal details
- Born: John Davison Rockefeller IV; June 18, 1937 New York City, U.S.
- Died: November 6, 2026 (aged 89) Washington, D.C., U.S.
- Party: Democratic
- Spouse: Sharon Percy (m. 1967)
- Children: 4, including Valerie and Justin
- Parents: John D. Rockefeller III; Blanchette Ferry Hooker
- Relatives: See Rockefeller family
- Education: Harvard University (BA); International Christian University (attended); Yale University (attended)
- Rockefeller's voice Rockefeller at a Senate Intelligence Committee hearing on reauthorizing the Patriot Act. Recorded April 27, 2005

John Davison "Jay" Rockefeller IV (June 18, 1937 – November 6, 2026) was an American politician who served as a United States senator from West Virginia from 1985 to 2015 and previously as governor of West Virginia from 1977 to 1985. He was a member of the Democratic Party.

Born into the prominent Rockefeller family in New York City, Rockefeller moved to Emmons, West Virginia, in 1964 to serve as a Volunteers in Service to America (VISTA) worker. He was first elected to public office as a member of the West Virginia House of Delegates (1966–1968). Rockefeller was later elected secretary of state of West Virginia (1968–1973) and was president of West Virginia Wesleyan College (1973–1975), and was elected to two terms as governor of West Virginia. He was first elected to the Senate in 1984, while still in office as governor.

As a senator, Rockefeller served on the powerful Senate Finance Committee, including as chairman of the Subcommittee on Medicare and Long-term Care (later Health Care). He became a leading spokesman for healthcare reform, advocating for improved and modernized Medicare, expanded access to healthcare, and increased health coverage for children. He authored the Children's Health Insurance Program (CHIP), that has provided health care coverage for millions of poor children. He played a crucial role in the passage of the Affordable Care Act (ACA) of 2010, advocating for a public insurance option. Rockefeller was also a major player regarding veterans' issues, serving on the Veterans' Affairs Committee for his entire Senate career, including multiple terms as its chairman. He focused on expanding research and treatment for service-related illnesses like Gulf War Illness and Agent Orange. He worked to reform the Veterans Affairs healthcare system.

Rockefeller became the state's senior U.S. senator when the long-serving senator Robert Byrd died in June 2010. He did not seek reelection in 2014 and was succeeded by U.S. Representative Shelley Moore Capito, a Republican. Rockefeller was the only member of his family to have held office as a Democrat, in what has been a traditionally Republican family.

== Early life and education ==
John Davison Rockefeller IV was born at New York Hospital in Lenox Hill, Manhattan, to John Davison Rockefeller III (1906–1978) and Blanchette Ferry Hooker (1909–1992), 26 days after the death of his patrilineal great-grandfather, John D. Rockefeller (1839–1937). He was a grandson of John D. Rockefeller Jr. Jay graduated from Phillips Exeter Academy in 1955. After his junior year at Harvard University, he spent three years studying Japanese at the International Christian University in Tokyo. He graduated from Harvard in 1961 with a Bachelor of Arts degree in Far Eastern languages and history. At Harvard, he was a member of the prestigious Fly Club. He attended Yale University and did graduate work in Asian history and studied the Chinese language.

After college, Rockefeller worked for the Peace Corps in Washington, D.C., under President John F. Kennedy, where he developed a friendship with Attorney General Robert F. Kennedy and worked as an assistant to Peace Corps Director Sargent Shriver. He served as the operations director for the Corps' largest overseas program, in the Philippines. He worked for a brief time in the Bureau of East Asian and Pacific Affairs. He continued his public service from 1964 to 1965 in the Volunteers in Service to America (VISTA), under President Lyndon B. Johnson, during which time he moved to Emmons, West Virginia.

== Career ==
=== State politics ===
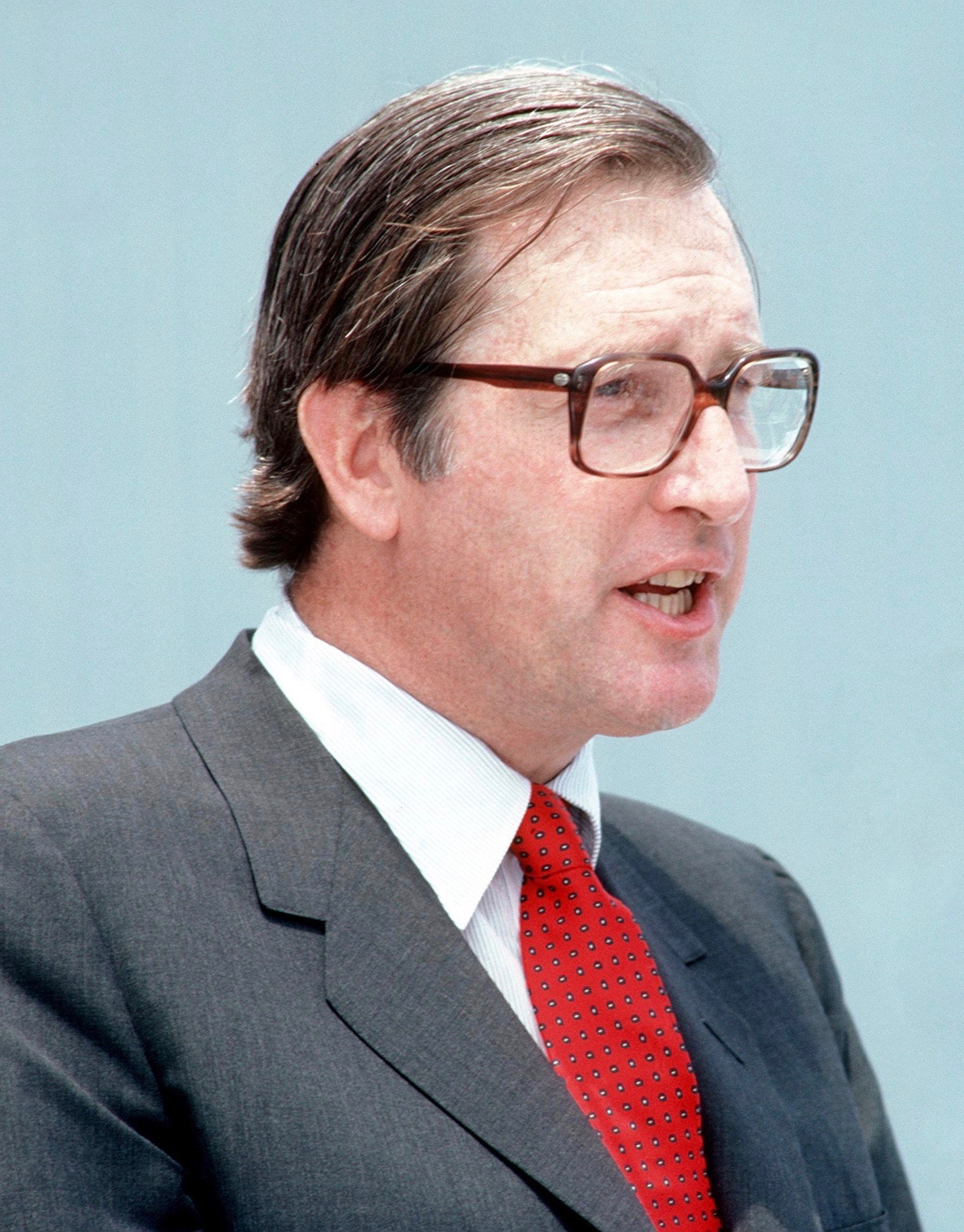
Governor Rockefeller giving a speech aboard USS Stump, July 1984

Rockefeller was elected to the West Virginia House of Delegates in 1966. In the summer of 1968, after New York senator Robert F. Kennedy's assassination, Rockefeller's uncle, then-Governor of New York Nelson Rockefeller, offered him the open seat. He refused. He was elected to the office of West Virginia Secretary of State in 1968. He won the Democratic nomination for governor in 1972 but was defeated in the general election by the Republican incumbent, Arch A. Moore Jr. Rockefeller then served as president of West Virginia Wesleyan College from 1973 to 1975.

Rockefeller was elected governor of West Virginia in 1976 and re-elected in 1980. He served as governor when manufacturing plants and coal mines were closing as the national recession of the early 1980s hit West Virginia particularly hard. Between 1982 and 1984, West Virginia's unemployment rate hovered between 15 and 20 percent.

=== U.S. Senate ===
==== Elections ====
In 1984, he was elected to the United States Senate, narrowly defeating businessman John Raese as Ronald Reagan easily carried the state in the presidential election. As in his 1980 gubernatorial campaign against Arch Moore, Rockefeller spent over $12 million to win his Senate seat. He was re-elected in 1990, 1996, 2002 and 2008 by substantial margins. He was chair of the Committee on Veterans' Affairs (1993–1995; January 3 to 20, 2001; and June 6, 2001 to January 3, 2003). Rockefeller chaired the Senate Committee on Commerce, Science, and Transportation from January 21, 2009, until he retired from the Senate on January 3, 2015.

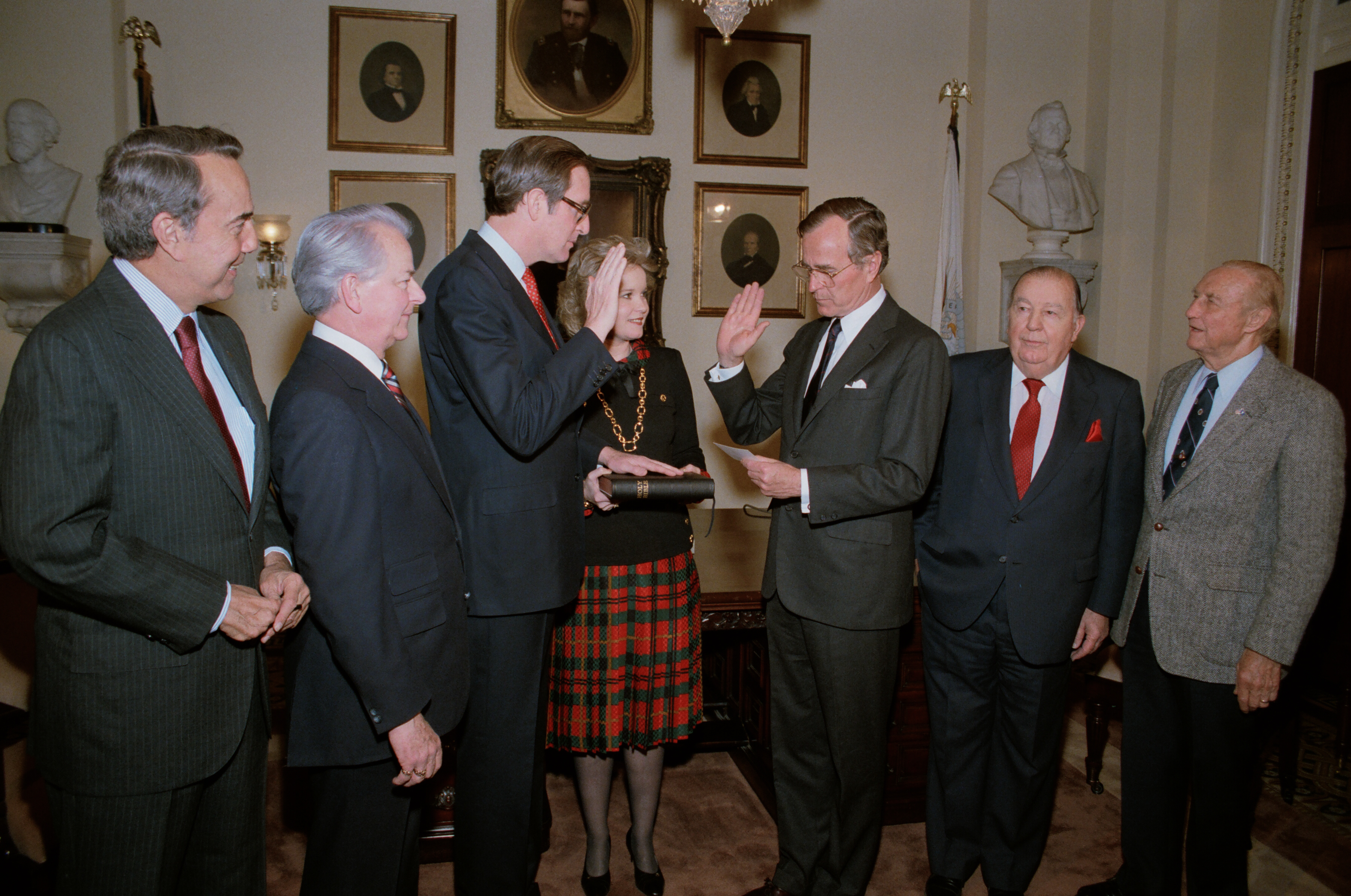
Surrounded by colleagues Robert C. Byrd, Bob Dole, Strom Thurmond and Jennings Randolph, Vice President George H.W. Bush administers the oath of office for Rockefeller in January 1985

==== Overview ====
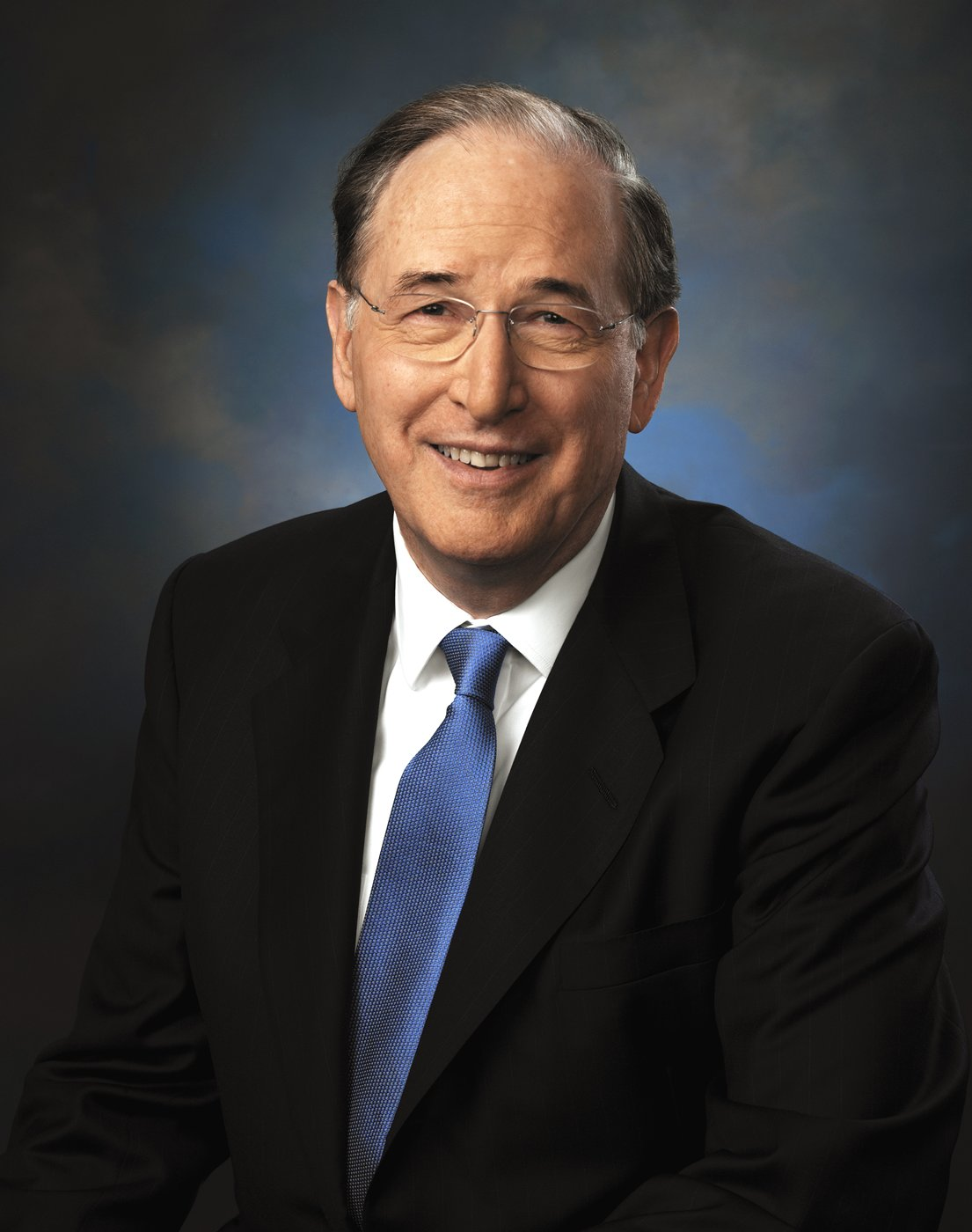
Rockefeller's official portrait in c. 2006

In April 1992, he was the Democratic Party's finance chairman and considered running for the presidency, but pulled out after consulting with friends and advisers. He went on to strongly endorse Bill Clinton as the Democratic nominee. During the general election campaign he accused Clinton's opponent, U.S. President George H.W. Bush, of playing "the politics of fear, division and greed".

He chaired the prominent Senate Intelligence Committee (retiring in January 2009), from which he commented frequently on the war in Iraq.

In 1993, Rockefeller became the principal Senate supporter, with Ted Kennedy, behind Bill and Hillary Clinton's sweeping health care reform package, liaising closely with the First Lady, opening up his mansion next to Rock Creek Park for its first strategy meeting. The reform was subsequently defeated by an alliance between the Business Roundtable and a small-business coalition.

In 2002, Rockefeller made an official visit to several Middle Eastern countries, during which he discussed his personal views regarding United States military intentions with the leaders of those countries. In October of that year, Rockefeller strongly expressed his concern for Saddam Hussein's alleged weapons of mass destruction program while addressing the U.S. Senate:

There has been some debate over how "imminent" a threat Iraq poses. I do believe that Iraq poses an imminent threat, but I also believe that after September 11, that question is increasingly outdated. It is in the nature of these weapons, and the way they are targeted against civilian populations, that documented capability and demonstrated intent may be the only warning we get. To insist on further evidence could put some of our fellow Americans at risk. Can we afford to take that chance? We cannot!

In November 2005 during a TV interview, Rockefeller stated,

I took a trip ... in January 2002 to Saudi Arabia, Jordan and Syria, and I told each of the heads of state that it was my view that George Bush had already made up his mind to go to war against Iraq, that that was a predetermined set course that had taken shape shortly after 9/11.

Rockefeller noted that the comment expresses his personal opinion, and that he was not privy to any confidential information that such action was planned. On October 11, 2002, he was one of 77 senators who voted for the Iraq Resolution authorizing the Iraq invasion.

In February 2010, regarding President Obama, Rockefeller said,

He says 'I'm for clean coal,' and then he says it in his speeches, but he doesn't say it in here ... And he doesn't say it in the minds of my own people. And he's beginning to not be believable to me.

Rockefeller faced criticism from West Virginia coal companies, which claimed that he was out of touch.

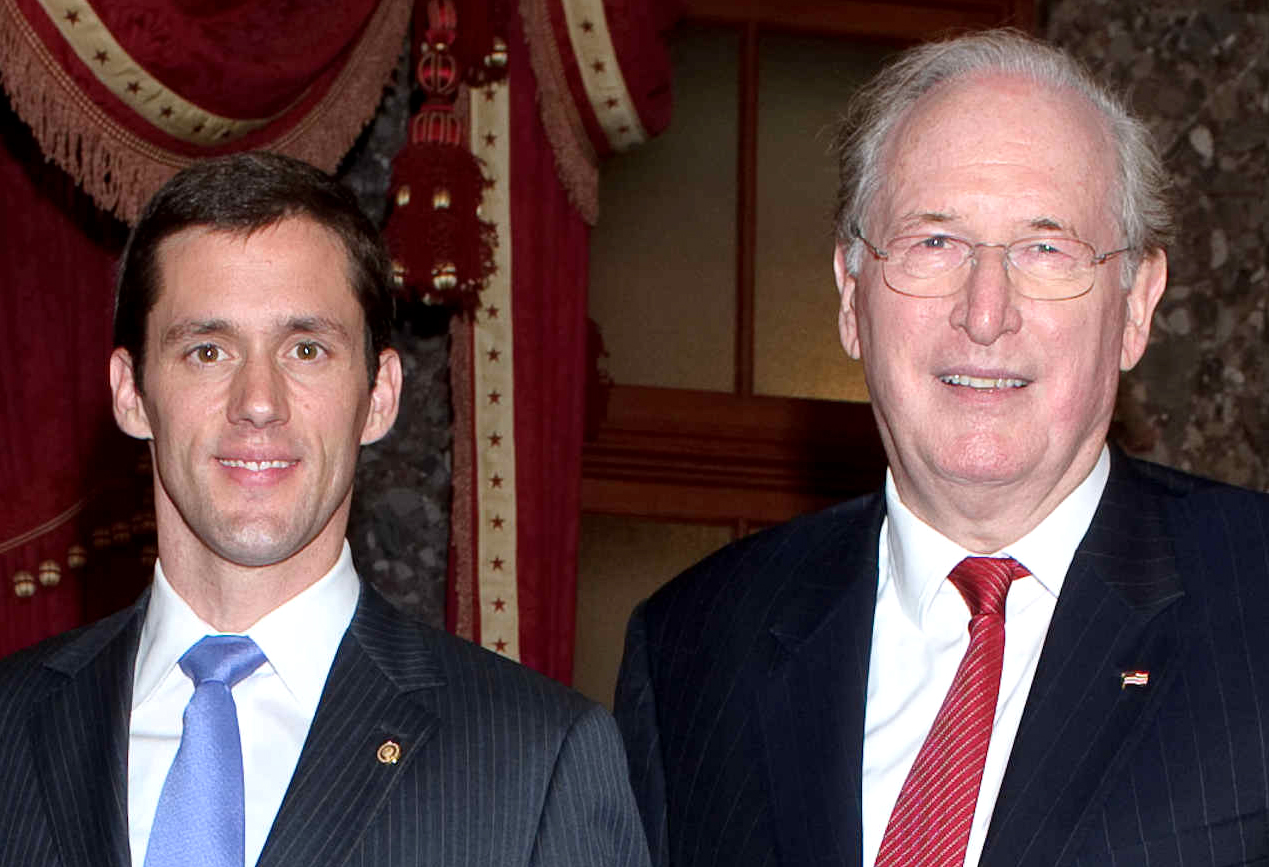
Rockefeller with fellow West Virginia senator Carte Goodwin

Rockefeller became the senior U.S. senator from West Virginia when Robert Byrd died in June 2010, after serving in the senate with Rockefeller for 25 years.

In July 2011 Rockefeller was prominent in calling for U.S. agencies to investigate whether alleged phone hacking at News Corporation's newspapers in the United Kingdom had targeted American victims of the September 11 attacks. Rockefeller and Barbara Boxer subsequently wrote to the oversight committee of Dow Jones & Company (a subsidiary of News Corporation) to request that it conduct an investigation into the hiring of former CEO Les Hinton, and whether any current or former executives had knowledge of or played a role in phone hacking.

He announced on January 11, 2013, that he would not run for a sixth term. On March 25, 2013, Rockefeller announced his support for gay marriage.

In November 2014, Rockefeller donated his senatorial archives to the West Virginia University Libraries and the West Virginia & Regional History Center. The archival collection documents his 30-year career in the United States Senate. The University's School of Policy and Politics was named after him in 2014.

According to the website GovTrack, Rockefeller missed 541 of 9,992 roll call votes from January 1985 to July 2014. This amounted to 5.4 percent, which was worse than the median of 2.0 percent among senators serving as of July 2014.

Rockefeller, along with his son Charles, was a trustee of New York's Asia Society, which was established by his father in 1956. He was also a member of the Council on Foreign Relations, a nonprofit think tank previously chaired by his uncle, David Rockefeller. As a senator, he voted against the 1993 North American Free Trade Agreement, which was heavily backed by David Rockefeller.

==== Committees ====
Rockefeller served on the following committees in the 112th Congress:

- Committee on Commerce, Science, and Transportation (chairman)
  - As chair of the full committee, Sen. Rockefeller may serve as an ex officio member of all subcommittees
- Committee on Finance
  - Subcommittee on Health Care (chairman)
  - Subcommittee on International Trade, Customs, and Global Competitiveness
  - Subcommittee on Social Security, Pensions, and Family Policy
- Select Committee on Intelligence
- Committee on Veterans' Affairs
- Joint Committee on Taxation

== Political positions ==
=== Iraq War ===
Rockefeller initially supported the use of force based upon the evidence presented by the intelligence community that linked Iraq to nuclear ambitions. After the Niger uranium forgeries, in which SISMI released documents that seemed to support allegations against Iraq, these documents were later declared to be inaccurate and an intelligence error by the White House. Rockefeller started an investigation into possible falsification and exaggeration of evidence for the war. Through the investigations, he became an outspoken critic of Bush and the Iraq War. As chair of the Intelligence committee, he presided over a critical report on the administration's handling of intelligence and war operations.

Rockefeller and the Senate Select Committee on Intelligence released the final two pieces of the Phase II report on war intelligence in Iraq on June 5, 2008. Rockefeller said, "The president and his advisers undertook a relentless public campaign in the aftermath of the attacks to use the war against Al Qaeda as a justification for overthrowing Saddam Hussein."

=== Television violence ===
In July 2007, Rockefeller announced that he planned to introduce legislation before the August congressional recess that would give the FCC the power to regulate TV violence. According to the edition of July 16, 2007, of Broadcasting & Cable, the new law would apply to both broadcast as well as cable and satellite programming. This would mark the first time that the FCC would be given power to regulate such a vast spectrum of content, which would include almost everything except material produced strictly for direct internet use. An aide to the senator said that his staff had also been carefully formulating the bill in such a way that it would be able to pass constitutional scrutiny by the courts.

=== Telecommunications companies ===
In 2007, Rockefeller began steering the Senate Intelligence Committee to grant retroactive immunity to telecommunications companies who were accused of unlawfully assisting the National Security Agency (NSA) in monitoring the communications of U.S. citizens.

This was an about-face of sorts for Senator Rockefeller, who had hand-written a letter to Vice President Dick Cheney in 2003 expressing his concerns about the legality of NSA's warrantless wire-tapping program. Some have attributed this change of heart to the spike in contributions from telecommunications companies to the senator just as these companies began lobbying Congress to protect them from lawsuits regarding their cooperation with the National Security Agency.

Between 2001 and the start of this lobbying effort, AT&T employees had contributed only $300 to the senator. After the lobbying effort began, AT&T employees and executives donated $19,350 in three months. The senator pledged not to rely on his vast fortune to fund his campaigns, and the AT&T contributions represent about 2% of the money he raised during the previous year.

=== Torture ===
Although publicly deploring torture, Rockefeller was one of two congressional Democrats briefed on waterboarding and other secret CIA practices in the early years of the George W. Bush administration, as well as the existence of taped evidence of such interrogations (later destroyed). In December 2007, Rockefeller opposed a special counsel or commission inquiry into the destruction of the tapes, stating "it is the job of the intelligence committees to do that."

On September 28, 2006, Rockefeller voted with a largely Republican majority to suspend habeas corpus provisions for anyone deemed by the executive branch an "unlawful combatant," barring them from challenging their detentions in court. Rockefeller's vote gave a retroactive, nine-year immunity to U.S. officials who authorized, ordered, or committed acts of torture and abuse, permitting the use of statements obtained through torture to be used in military tribunals so long as the abuse took place by December 30, 2005. Rockefeller's vote authorized President Bush to establish permissible interrogation techniques and to "interpret the meaning and application" of international Geneva Convention standards, so long as the coercion fell short of "serious" bodily or psychological injury. The bill became law on October 17, 2006.

=== 2008 presidential election ===
On February 29, 2008, he endorsed Barack Obama for president of the United States, citing Obama's judgment on the war in Iraq and national security issues, and calling him the right candidate to lead the U.S. during a time of instability at home and abroad. This endorsement stood in stark contrast to the results of Rockefeller’s state primary that was easily won by Hillary Clinton.

On April 7, 2008, in an interview for The Charleston Gazette, Rockefeller criticized John McCain's Vietnam experience:

McCain was a fighter pilot, who dropped laser-guided missiles from 35,000 feet. He was long gone when they hit. What happened when they get to the ground? He doesn't know. You have to care about the lives of people. McCain never gets into those issues.

The McCain campaign called for an apology from Senator Rockefeller and for Barack Obama, whom Rockefeller endorsed, to denounce the comment. Rockefeller later apologized for the comment and the Obama campaign issued a statement expressing Obama's disagreement with the comment. Senator Lindsey Graham (R) of South Carolina noted that "John didn't drop bombs from 35,000 feet. ... the bombs were not laser guided (in the 1960 and 1970s)".

=== Cybersecurity ===
On April 1, 2009, Rockefeller introduced the Cybersecurity Act of 2009 - S.773 before Congress. Citing the vulnerability of the Internet to cyber-attacks, the bill makes provisions to turn the U.S. Department of Commerce into a public-private clearing house to share potential threat information with the owners of large private networks. It authorizes the U.S. Secretary of Commerce to sequester any information deemed necessary, without regard to any law.

It would also authorize the president to declare an undefined "cyber-emergency" which would allow them to shut down any and all traffic to what they consider to be a compromised server.

On June 1, 2011, Rockefeller sponsored the fourth West Virginia Homeland Security Summit and Expo. The event ran two days and focused on homeland security with Rockefeller emphasizing cybersecurity.

=== Health care ===
In 1997, Rockefeller co-authored the Children's Health Insurance Program (CHIP) – a program aimed at giving low-income children health insurance coverage. Annually, CHIP has been successfully covering about 6 million children, who otherwise would have been uninsured. On September 30, 2007, the program expired, requiring Congress to reauthorize the legislation. On August 2, 2007, the vote for reauthorization passed legislation by a strong, bipartisan vote (68–31).

Rockefeller authored successful legislation that required the U.S. Department of Veterans Affairs, for the first time, to provide a wide range of extended care services—such as home health care, adult day care, respite care, and hospice care—to veterans who use the VA health care system.

Rockefeller was also a strong supporter of the fight against Alzheimer's disease and neurological disease. The Blanchette Rockefeller Neurosciences Institute (BRNI) was founded in Morgantown, West Virginia, in 1999 by Rockefeller and his family to help advance medical and scientific understanding of Alzheimer's and other diseases of the brain. BRNI is the world's only non-profit institute dedicated exclusively to the study of both human memory and diseases of memory. Its primary mission is to accelerate neurological discoveries from the lab, including diagnostic tools and treatments, to the clinic to benefit patients who suffer from neurological and psychiatric diseases. A $30 million state-of-the-art BRNI research facility was opened at West Virginia University in the fall of 2008. The approximately 80,000 square feet (7,400 m^{2}) three-level building would house 100 scientists by 2012.

On Healthcare reform, Rockefeller was a proponent of a public option, fighting with some Democrats on the finance committee, in particular Max Baucus, the chairman of the committee, who contended that there was not enough support for a public option to gather the 60 votes needed to prevent a filibuster. Baucus asked repeatedly for Rockefeller to stop speaking on the issue.

On September 29, 2009, Rockefeller offered an amendment to the Baucus Health Bill in the Senate Finance Committee to add a public option. The amendment was rejected 15 to 8, with five Democrats (Baucus, Kent Conrad, Blanche Lincoln, Tom Carper, Bill Nelson) and all Republicans voting no.

Rockefeller supported President Barack Obama's health reform legislation; he voted for the Patient Protection and Affordable Care Act in December 2009, and he voted for the Health Care and Education Reconciliation Act of 2010.

== Personal life and death ==
From 1967 until his death, Rockefeller was married to Sharon Percy, the chief executive officer of WETA-TV, the leading PBS station in the Washington, D.C., area, which broadcasts such programs as PBS NewsHour and Washington Week. She is a twin daughter of Senator Chuck Percy and Jeanne Valerie Dickerson.

Jay and Sharon had four children, including Valerie Rockefeller Wayne and Justin Rockefeller.

The Rockefellers resided together in Northwest Washington, D.C., and maintained a permanent residence in Charleston, West Virginia. They had a ranch in the Grand Teton National Park in Jackson Hole, Wyoming. President Bill Clinton, a friend of Rockefeller's, and the Clinton family vacationed at the ranch in August 1995.

Rockefeller was related to several Republican Party supporters and former officeholders: his paternal grandmother Abby Aldrich Rockefeller was a daughter of Rhode Island Senator Nelson W. Aldrich. John D. Rockefeller Jr. and Abby's youngest son was the banker David Rockefeller. His uncle Winthrop Rockefeller served as Governor of Arkansas from 1967–1971. Another uncle, Nelson Rockefeller, served as Governor of New York from 1959–1973 and as the 41st Vice President of the United States under President Gerald Ford from 1974–1977. In the former post, Nelson offered to appoint Jay to the United States Senate seat that came open upon the death of Robert F. Kennedy in 1968, but as a Democrat, Jay was compelled to refuse. Jay was also a first cousin of Arkansas Lt. Governor Winthrop Paul Rockefeller.

Jay Rockefeller died at his home in Washington, D.C., on November 6, 2026, at the age of 89. West Virginia Governor Patrick Morrisey ordered flags in the state to fly at half staff for Rockefeller from November 6 until sunrise on November 13, 2026. Plans have also been made for Rockefeller to have a funeral in the Washington National Cathedral. On November 13, 2026, it was announced that Rockefeller's funeral would be held at the Washington National Cathedral on November 23, 2026, and would be live streamed on the cathedral's website and also available for the public to view afterwards.

== Electoral history ==
1966 West Virginia House of Delegates election in Kanawha County Elect Fourteen
| Party | Candidate | Votes | % |
|---|---|---|---|
| Democratic | Jay Rockefeller | 36,789 | 4.63 |
| Republican | Cleo S. Jones | 32,901 | 4.14 |
| Republican | Walter W. Carey | 31,924 | 4.02 |
| Democratic | George K.W. Woo | 31,492 | 3.96 |
| Democratic | Ivor F. Boiarsky | 30,802 | 3.88 |
| Republican | Lon Clark Kinder | 29,992 | 3.77 |
| Republican | Paul Zakaib | 29,947 | 3.77 |
| Republican | James Clay Jeter | 29,721 | 3.74 |
| Democratic | Si Galperin | 29,429 | 3.70 |
| Republican | Leo G. Kopelman | 29,266 | 3.68 |
| Republican | Alfred A. Lilly | 28,746 | 3.62 |
| Republican | Thomas E. Potter | 28,704 | 3.61 |
| Republican | Eric Nelson Sr. | 28,333 | 3.57 |
| Republican | Russell L. Davisson | 28,331 | 3.57 |
| Democratic | Thomas A. Knight | 28,319 | 3.56 |
| Republican | Charles Young | 28,043 | 3.53 |
| Republican | James W. Thornhill | 27,765 | 3.49 |
| Republican | William Ricks | 27,480 | 3.46 |
| Republican | Blanche Horan | 27,458 | 3.46 |
| Democratic | Jack L. Pauley | 26,434 | 3.33 |
| Democratic | J.F. Bedell Jr. | 26,222 | 3.30 |
| Democratic | Kelly L. Castleberry | 26,125 | 3.29 |
| Democratic | Jesse S. Barker | 26,030 | 3.28 |
| Democratic | Dempsey Gibson | 25,888 | 3.26 |
| Democratic | Fred L. Scott | 25,616 | 3.22 |
| Democratic | James K. Thomas Jr. | 24,967 | 3.14 |
| Democratic | Pat Board Jr. | 24,559 | 3.09 |
| Democratic | L.E. Thompson | 23,224 | 2.92 |

1968 West Virginia Secretary of State election
| Party | Candidate | Votes | % |
|---|---|---|---|
| Democratic | Jay Rockefeller | 433,142 | 60.92 |
| Republican | John S. Callebs | 277,877 | 39.08 |

1972 West Virginia gubernatorial election
| Party | Candidate | Votes | % |
|---|---|---|---|
| Republican | Arch A. Moore Jr. | 423,817 | 54.74 |
| Democratic | Jay Rockefeller | 350,462 | 45.26 |

1976 West Virginia gubernatorial election
| Party | Candidate | Votes | % |
|---|---|---|---|
| Democratic | Jay Rockefeller | 495,661 | 66.15 |
| Republican | Cecil H. Underwood | 253,420 | 33.82 |

1980 West Virginia gubernatorial election
| Party | Candidate | Votes | % |
|---|---|---|---|
| Democratic | Jay Rockefeller | 401,863 | 54.15 |
| Republican | Arch A. Moore Jr. | 337,240 | 45.44 |

1984 United States Senate election in West Virginia
| Party | Candidate | Votes | % |
|---|---|---|---|
| Democratic | Jay Rockefeller | 374,233 | 51.82 |
| Republican | John Raese | 344,680 | 47.73 |

1990 United States Senate election in West Virginia
| Party | Candidate | Votes | % |
|---|---|---|---|
| Democratic | Jay Rockefeller | 276,234 | 68.32 |
| Republican | John C. Yoder | 128,071 | 31.68 |

1996 United States Senate election in West Virginia
| Party | Candidate | Votes | % |
|---|---|---|---|
| Democratic | Jay Rockefeller | 456,526 | 76.65 |
| Republican | Betty Burks | 139,088 | 23.35 |

2002 United States Senate election in West Virginia
| Party | Candidate | Votes | % |
|---|---|---|---|
| Democratic | Jay Rockefeller | 275,281 | 63.11 |
| Republican | Jay Wolfe | 160,902 | 36.89 |

2008 United States Senate election in West Virginia
| Party | Candidate | Votes | % |
|---|---|---|---|
| Democratic | Jay Rockefeller | 447,985 | 63.71 |
| Republican | Jay Wolfe | 255,074 | 36.27 |

== Awards and decorations ==
- National Intelligence Distinguished Public Service Medal, 2009.
- Grand Cordon from the Order of the Rising Sun (Japan), 2013.
- The National Consumers League’s first-ever Consumer and Labor Leadership Award (shared with Sen. Tom Harkin), commemorating their service to America's consumers and workers; Rockefeller also received the NCL Trumpeter award in 1992.

== See also ==
- Kykuit
- US Senate report on chemical weapons
- 2005 CIA interrogation tapes destruction

Political offices
| Preceded by Robert D. Bailey Jr. | Secretary of State of West Virginia; 1969–1973 | Succeeded by Edgar F. Heiskell III |
| Preceded by Arch A. Moore Jr. | Governor of West Virginia; 1977–1985 | Succeeded by Arch A. Moore Jr. |
Party political offices
| Preceded by James Sprouse | Democratic nominee for Governor of West Virginia; 1972, 1976, 1980 | Succeeded by Clyde See |
| Preceded by Jennings Randolph | Democratic nominee for U.S. Senator from West Virginia (Class 2); 1984, 1990, 1996, 2002, 2008 | Succeeded by Natalie Tennant |
U.S. Senate
| Preceded by Jennings Randolph | U.S. Senator (Class 2) from West Virginia; 1985–2015; Served alongside: Robert Byrd, Carte Goodwin, Joe Manchin | Succeeded by Shelley Moore Capito |
| Preceded by Alan Cranston | Chair of the Senate Veterans' Affairs Committee; 1993–1995 | Succeeded by Alan K. Simpson |
| Preceded by Alan K. Simpson | Ranking Member of the Senate Veterans' Affairs Committee; 1995–2001 | Succeeded by Arlen Specter |
| Preceded by Arlen Specter | Chair of the Senate Veterans' Affairs Committee; 2001 | Succeeded by Arlen Specter |
| Preceded by Arlen Specter | Chair of the Senate Veterans' Affairs Committee; 2001–2003 | Succeeded by Arlen Specter |
| Preceded by Richard Shelby | Ranking Member of the Senate Intelligence Committee; 2003–2007 | Succeeded by Kit Bond |
| Preceded by Pat Roberts | Chair of the Senate Intelligence Committee; 2007–2009 | Succeeded by Dianne Feinstein |
| Preceded by Daniel Inouye | Chair of the Senate Commerce Committee; 2009–2015 | Succeeded by John Thune |
