= 1988 United States Senate election in West Virginia =

- November 8, 1988
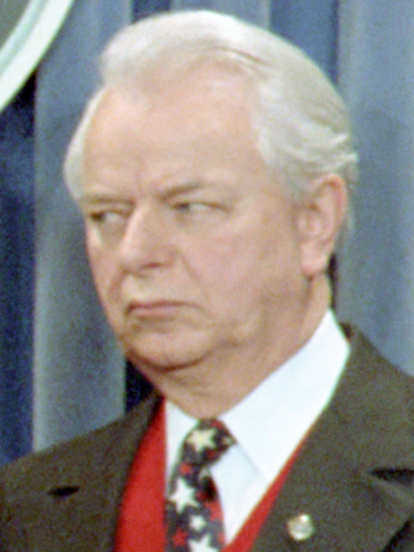

Nominee	Robert Byrd	Jay Wolfe
Party	Democratic	Republican
Popular vote	410,983	223,564
Percentage	64.77%	35.23%
- County results Byrd: 50–60% 60–70% 70–80% Wolfe: 50–60%
U.S. senator before election
Robert Byrd
Democratic
Elected U.S. Senator
Robert Byrd
Democratic

The 1988 United States Senate election in West Virginia took place on November 8, 1988. Incumbent Democratic U.S. Senator Robert Byrd won re-election to a sixth term.

== Candidates ==
=== Democratic ===
- Robert Byrd, incumbent U.S. Senator

=== Republican ===
- Jay Wolfe, state senator

== Results ==
General election results
Party	Candidate	Votes	%
Democratic	Robert Byrd (incumbent)	410,983	64.77%
Republican	Jay Wolfe	223,564	35.23%
Democratic hold			

== See also ==
- 1988 United States Senate elections
