= Arch A. Moore Jr. =

American politician (1923–2015)

Arch Moore
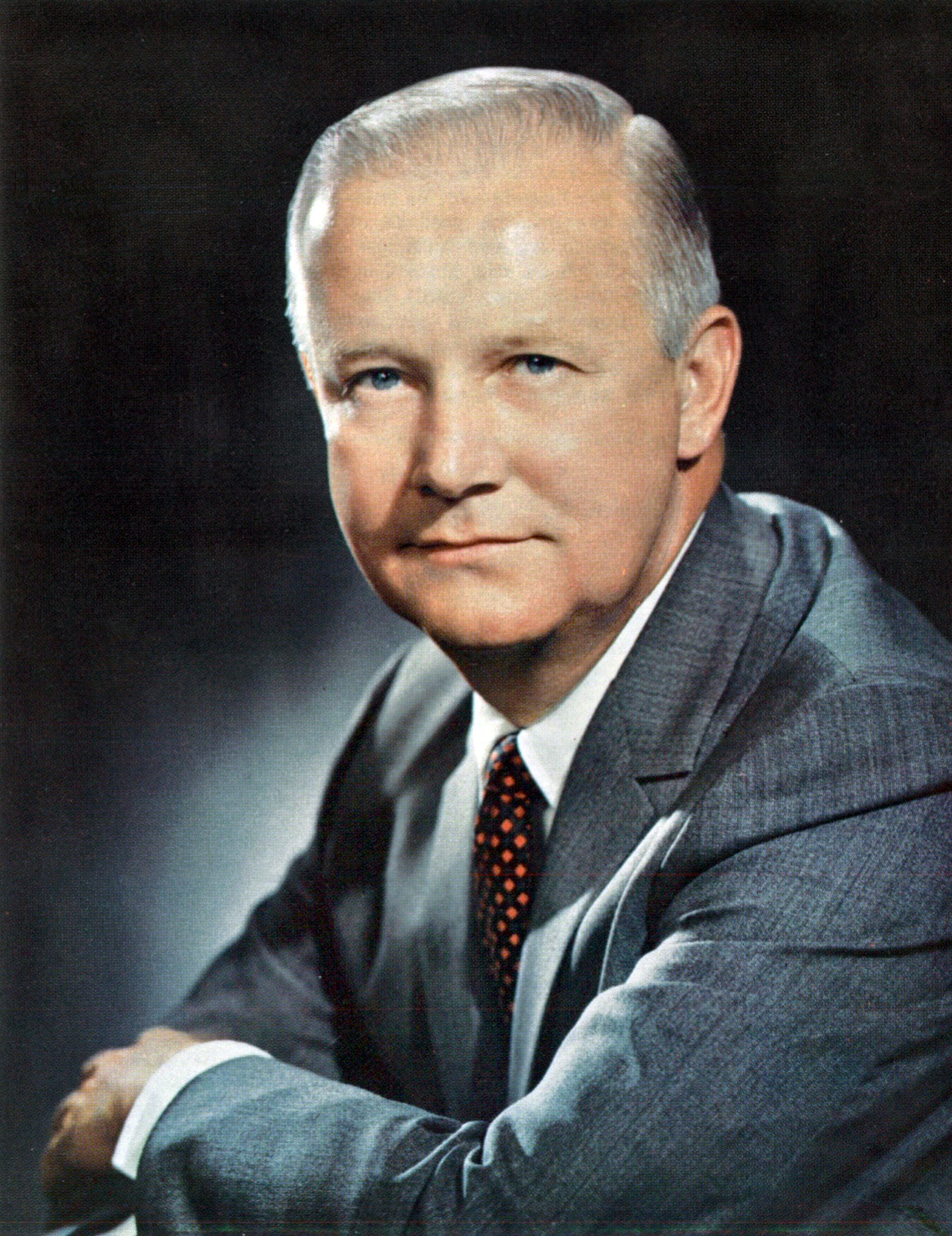
- Moore in 1969

28th & 30th Governor of West Virginia
- In office January 14, 1985 – January 16, 1989
- Preceded by: Jay Rockefeller
- Succeeded by: Gaston Caperton
- In office January 13, 1969 – January 17, 1977
- Preceded by: Hulett C. Smith
- Succeeded by: Jay Rockefeller

Chair of the National Governors Association
- In office September 12, 1971 – June 4, 1972
- Preceded by: Warren E. Hearnes
- Succeeded by: Marvin Mandel

Member of the U.S. House of Representatives from West Virginia's 1st district
- In office January 3, 1957 – January 3, 1969
- Preceded by: Bob Mollohan
- Succeeded by: Bob Mollohan

Personal details
- Born: Arch Alfred Moore Jr. April 16, 1923 Moundsville, West Virginia, U.S.
- Died: January 7, 2015 (aged 91) Charleston, West Virginia, U.S.
- Party: Republican
- Spouse: Shelley Riley (m. 1949; died 2014)
- Children: 3 (including Shelley Moore Capito)
- Relatives: Moore Capito (grandson); Riley Moore (grandson)
- Education: West Virginia University (BA, LLB)

Military service
- Allegiance: United States
- Branch/service: United States Army
- Years of service: 1943–1946
- Rank: Sergeant
- Unit: 334th Infantry Regiment, 84th Infantry Division
- Battles/wars: World War II • European Theater of Operations
- Awards: Bronze Star; Purple Heart; Combat Infantryman Badge; European Theater of Operations Ribbon, 3 battle stars

Arch Alfred Moore Jr. (April 16, 1923 – January 7, 2015) was an American lawyer and Republican politician who served as the 28th and 30th governor of West Virginia. He held office from 1969 to 1977 and again from 1985 to 1989, making him the longest-serving governor in the state's history with 12 years in office. Moore began his political career as a state legislator in 1952 and later became a prominent figure in West Virginia politics. He was the father of U.S. Senator Shelley Moore Capito and the grandfather of U.S. Representative Riley Moore.

Moore's tenure was marked by significant infrastructure development and economic initiatives, but his political career ended in controversy. Amid allegations of corruption, he lost his 1988 reelection bid to Democrat Gaston Caperton. In 1990, he pleaded guilty to five felony charges, leading to a sentence of five years and ten months in federal prison, of which he served over three years. His conviction resulted in disbarment, the forfeiture of his state pension, and a $750,000 settlement paid to the state in 1995.

== Early life ==
Moore was born in Moundsville, West Virginia, in the state's industrial northern panhandle, the son of Genevieve (née Jones) and Archie Alfred Moore. He was born into a political family. His grandfather, Forest Taylor Moore (1859–1950), was a ten-term delegate and minority leader in the West Virginia House of Delegates and his uncle, Everett Franklin Moore (1885–1965), was also a politician. Moore excelled at basketball while attending Moundsville High School. Upon graduation, he worked in a factory and on an oil pipeline.

He briefly attended Lafayette College in Easton, Pennsylvania, before he was drafted for World War II service. He was in the Army Specialized Training Program training to be an engineer, but military manpower requirements changed and he was sent to the infantry. Assigned to the 334th Infantry Regiment, a unit of the 84th Infantry Division, he received a disfiguring wound in the jaw from enemy machine gun fire in Germany, November 1944. Moore was left for dead for two days in a German farmer's beet field after 33 of the 36 members of his platoon died in battle. Following his wounding, he was transferred to Liege, Belgium, where he underwent facial reconstruction surgery. Because the bullet that had wounded him passed through his tongue, he was not able to speak for about a year after his wounding. Public speaking, a skill he would later exercise while holding public office, was part of his physical therapy. He would give "lectures" to troops on their way to the front lines. Sergeant Moore was decorated with the Purple Heart, Bronze Star, Combat Infantryman's Badge and European Theater of Operations Ribbon with three battle stars.

He then entered West Virginia University graduating in 1948 and then from its law school in 1951. While at WVU, he was involved with student government and founded "Mountaineer Week," a celebration of West Virginia culture in response to his perception that the growing number of out-of-state students at the school were changing its character. The event has become a permanent part of the school's calendar. He was also a member of the Beta Psi chapter of Beta Theta Pi at West Virginia University and was a recipient of the fraternity's Oxford Cup.

After graduating from law school, Moore returned to Moundsville to practice law with his uncle, Everett Moore.

== Congressional career, 1957–1969 ==
Moore was elected to the West Virginia House of Delegates in 1952. In 1954, Moore made his first run for the US Congress, challenging incumbent Democratic Congressman Bob Mollohan, but lost. In 1956, Moore was elected to the seat following Mollohan having vacated it to run for Governor of West Virginia, a race Mollohan eventually lost to Republican Cecil Underwood. In 1962, his district was merged with the 3rd District of longtime Democratic incumbent Cleveland M. Bailey; Moore won by just 762 votes. Moore was re-elected in 1964 and 1966, before seeking the governor's office in 1968. He served a total of six terms in Congress, from 1957 through 1969.

His terms in the House were marked by strong support for public works projects and for civil rights. Moore voted in favor of the Civil Rights Acts of 1957, 1960, 1964, and 1968, as well as the 24th Amendment to the U.S. Constitution and the Voting Rights Act of 1965. During the early Sixties, as one journal noted at the time, Moore bragged about voting “liberal.” Nevertheless, during the course of his Congressional career Moore had a mostly conservative voting record. Moore became the ranking Republican on the House Subcommittee on Immigration and Nationality in 1960.

== Governor of West Virginia, 1969–1977 ==
Moore was elected to his first term as governor in 1968, defeating Cecil H. Underwood in the Republican primary and Democrat James Marshall Sprouse in the general election. Just two days before the general election, on November 3, 1968, Moore was in a helicopter crash in Lincoln County. He and West Virginia Supreme Court candidate Dennis Knapp were on their way to the town of Hamlin to campaign when their pilot crash-landed the helicopter on the Hamlin High School football field in an attempt to avoid power lines. Moore sustained a ruptured leg muscle and two broken ribs in the crash, while Knapp suffered a broken collar bone. After winning the election, Moore told reporters he thought "the Lord voted for me" via the crash.

The state's Constitution, which had formerly had a one-term term limit and provided for a weak governor system, was amended in 1968 to strengthen the powers of the governor and in 1970 to provide for a two-term limit. Moore became the first person re-elected governor in 1972, defeating Jay Rockefeller.

A notable event of Moore's first term was the 1969 strike of the state's highway workers. From March 3–11, over 2,600 of these workers struck in an attempt to get the state to recognize their union. Moore summarily fired those who had walked off the job, later citing this act as a matter of state safety. 530 of the highway workers who went on strike were able to reclaim their jobs after the strike was over, but more than 2,000 of them were permanently dismissed. Moore's stance during this strike was markedly different from actions on labor that he took later in his Governorship. He would go on to advocate for insurance benefits of hospital workers and pay increases for teachers and other school staff. Furthermore, he pressured the West Virginia legislature to increase workers compensation benefits by 75% and helped to settle a national strike of coal miners.

Moore's first two terms as governor are best remembered for improvements in the state's highway system and for the Buffalo Creek Flood disaster. During Moore's first two terms as governor, West Virginia built over 225 miles (362 km) of interstate highways through mountainous terrain and the New River Gorge Bridge, once the world's longest steel arch bridge. This building was made possible by The Roads Development Amendment (1968), a $350 million bond amendment that gave the State of West Virginia the ability to match Federal highway funding to the state, as well as the Better Roads Amendment (1964), a $200 million bond issue. By the end of Moore's tenure as governor, all of I-79, I-64, I-68, and the West Virginia Turnpike (I-77) were completed.

Moore was actively involved in the National Governors Association during his tenure as Governor of West Virginia. He was chair of this organization from 1971 to 1972.

=== Corruption charges and trial ===
In 1975 Moore and his 1972 campaign manager were accused by federal prosecutors of extorting $25,000 from the president of a holding company seeking a state charter for a new bank. Both were acquitted in 1976.

=== Buffalo Creek settlement ===
In the last week of his second term in 1977, Moore accepted a $1 million payment from Pittston Coal Company to settle accounts from the Buffalo Creek Disaster. The state had initially sued for $100 million, half of which was slated to cover cleanup and restoration expenses. The reduced settlement accepted by Moore did not come close to covering the $9.5 million cleanup costs expended by the federal government; in 1988, these costs were reimbursed by the State of West Virginia. The government had been warned as early as the late 1960s of the instability of the Buffalo Creek gob dams, yet the state failed to take measures to prevent the accident from occurring.

Moore is also remembered for several other incidents stemming from the Buffalo Creek Disaster. After the flood, the governor attempted to use disaster relief funds to build a limited access superhighway through the hollow to connect Logan County with Raleigh County. Several hundred properties were purchased via eminent domain by the state for the right-of-way and a two lane road was reconstructed back up the hollow. The highway, however, failed to materialize. Subsequently, in many cases, the state refused to sell the former owners back their land.

Moore had also made a promise to residents of Buffalo Creek Hollow to construct a community center as part of the rebuilding effort. However, in the end, the center promised by Moore and the State of West Virginia was never built. Arnold & Porter, a Washington, D.C. law firm, handled a lawsuit filed by approximately 600 survivors, which resulted in a settlement of $13.5 million, or roughly $13,000.00 per person after legal fees. Arnold & Porter took a portion of the legal fees paid to them and had the community center constructed in the hollow at their expense.

In a 2007 interview with West Virginia Public Broadcasting, Moore claimed that he had nothing to do with the state's lawsuit against the Pittston Coal Company. Rather, it was the state's attorney general, Chauncey H. Browning Jr. who handled the suit under the direction of laws passed by the state legislature. In Moore's words, he was blamed by unfair newspaper reports for the inequitable settlement because his signature appeared on its final documents. Moore claims that the lawyers from the Pittston Coal Company insisted that he sign these documents, though he had nothing to do with their contents.

== U.S. Senate race, 1978 ==
In 1976 Moore was legally barred from seeking a third term and declined to challenge incumbent Robert C. Byrd for a seat in the United States Senate. Instead, he began a two-year campaign for the state's other Senate seat, which was expected to be vacated by the aging Jennings Randolph in 1978. To the surprise of almost all observers, the obviously declining Randolph stood for re-election. His campaign was entirely financed by then-governor Jay Rockefeller, as Randolph's six-year term as Senator and a theoretical second Rockefeller term as governor would both expire in 1984, permitting Rockefeller to run for an open seat. Moore was outspent by 5 to 1 in this election, and lost by 4,717 votes.

== Third term as Governor of West Virginia, 1985–1989 ==
In 1980 Moore sought his third term as Governor. He faced Rockefeller in a rematch of the 1972 election. Rockefeller outspent him by a figure of 20 to 1, and easily defeated Moore 54%-45%.

In 1984 Moore once again ran for governor when Rockefeller made a successful bid for the U.S. Senate. He defeated State House Speaker Clyde See to become the only West Virginia governor to be elected to three terms in office. He again turned his attention to highways, and saw the completion in 1988 of the last major section of interstate highway in the country, which had been left unbuilt during the Rockefeller terms. He was soundly defeated for reelection in 1988 by Gaston Caperton.

== Federal conviction ==
In 1990, after an extensive federal investigation, Moore pleaded guilty to five felonies, including mail fraud, tax fraud, extortion, and obstruction of justice. He agreed to plead guilty after he was told that federal investigators had taped him conspiring with his former campaign manager, John Leaberry, to obstruct the investigation into his activities. Moore pleaded guilty to an indictment that said he accepted illegal payments from lobbyists during his 1984 and 1988 election campaigns, which he failed to report on his Federal income tax returns for 1984 and 1985. Furthermore, he also plead guilty to extorting more than $573,000 from Maben Energy Corporation, a coal company based in the town of Beckley, and obstructed the investigation of this activity. Moore had helped Maben receive a refund of $2 million from the state's Black Lung Fund, an aid program for miners with the disease, in exchange for roughly 25% of this sum.

For these crimes, Moore was fined $3.2 million, though he paid only $750,000, after reaching a settlement. He was sentenced to five years and ten months in prison. Of this sentence, Moore served two years and eight months in federal prison in Alabama and Kentucky and four months of home confinement at his home in Glen Dale, Marshall County.

After his guilty plea, Moore tried repeatedly to withdraw it. The United States Court of Appeals for the Fourth Circuit rebuffed his attempts to withdraw his plea in April 1991, and the U.S. Supreme Court refused his arguments in October 1995. For the remainder of his life, Moore continued to maintain his innocence. He later claimed that he made the plea based on bad advice. In an interview with West Virginia Public Broadcasting he said: "I followed advice that I got, that advice was not the right advice."

As a result of his conviction, Moore was disbarred. In the last decades of his life he tried vehemently to get his law license reinstated. When asked why he wanted to be reinstated, Moore cited his childhood desire to become a lawyer. "It's something I always was and something I always wanted to be," he said in a 2007 interview. He was unsuccessful.

== Personal life ==
Moore married Shelley Riley in 1949. The two had met while students at WVU. They have three children. His daughter Shelley Moore Capito is the current senior United States senator from West Virginia. Moore's grandsons, Moore Capito and Riley Moore, are also politicians.

Newly inaugurated West Virginia Governor Arch A. Moore Jr. was approved for membership in the Sons of the American Revolution on January 21, 1969. His qualifying Patriot ancestor was Private James Jones, who served in the Prince William County, Virginia militia.

Moore died in Charleston on January 7, 2015, at the age of 91, one day after his daughter, Shelley Moore Capito, was sworn in to the United States Senate. When asked about his legacy, he said he was proud of his three terms as governor. "You'll run into Arch Moore stories for the rest of your life, and nine and a half out of ten will be positive," he told West Virginia Public Broadcasting in 2007. "I'm still working on the other half."

In 2006 former West Virginia Tax Commissioner Brad Crouser, who served during Governor Moore's third term, published the first biography of Moore, Arch: The Life of Governor Arch A. Moore Jr.

Moore's political papers are housed at the West Virginia and Regional History Center at West Virginia University. This collection contains documents from his time as a Congressman and governor.

U.S. House of Representatives
Preceded by Bob Mollohan	Member of the U.S. House of Representatives from West Virginia's 1st congressional district 1957–1969	Succeeded by Bob Mollohan
Party political offices
Preceded by Cecil Underwood	Republican nominee for Governor of West Virginia; 1968, 1972	Succeeded by Cecil Underwood
Preceded by Kit Bond	Chair of the Republican Governors Association; 1975–1976	Succeeded by Robert Bennett
Preceded by Louise Leonard	Republican nominee for U.S. Senator from West Virginia (Class 2); 1978	Succeeded by John Raese
Preceded by Cecil Underwood	Republican nominee for Governor of West Virginia; 1980, 1984, 1988	Succeeded by Cleve Benedict
Political offices
Preceded by Hulett Smith	Governor of West Virginia; 1969–1977	Succeeded by Jay Rockefeller
Preceded by Warren Hearnes	Chair of the National Governors Association; 1971–1972	Succeeded by Marvin Mandel
Preceded by Jay Rockefeller	Governor of West Virginia; 1985–1989	Succeeded by Gaston Caperton
