= List of West Virginia University College of Law alumni =

Following is a list of notable alumni from the West Virginia University College of Law.

== Business ==
- John T. Chambers (J.D. 1974), CEO of Cisco

== Judiciary ==
- Tim Armstead (J.D. 1990), justice, Supreme Court of Appeals of West Virginia (2018–) and 54th speaker of West Virginia House of Delegates (2015–2018)
- John P. Bailey (J.D. 1976), judge, United States District Court for the Northern District of West Virginia (2007–)
- William E. Baker (L 1896), judge, United States District Court for the Northern District of West Virginia (1921–1954)
- Irene Berger (J.D. 1979), judge, United States District Court for the Southern District of West Virginia (2009–)
- Herbert Stephenson Boreman (L 1920), judge, United States Court of Appeals for the Fourth Circuit (1959–1982) and United States District Court for the Northern District of West Virginia (1954–1959)
- W. Craig Broadwater (J.D. 1977), judge, United States District Court for the Northern District of West Virginia (1996–2006)
- Chauncey Browning Sr. (L 1927), 25th attorney general of West Virginia (1952) and justice, Supreme Court of Appeals of West Virginia (1952–1971)
- C. Haley Bunn (J.D. 2010), justice, Supreme Court of Appeals of West Virginia (2022–)
- Robert Charles Chambers (L 1977), judge, United States District Court for the Southern District of West Virginia (1997–) and 50th speaker of West Virginia House of Delegates (1987–1997)
- John Thomas Copenhaver Jr. (L 1950), judge, United States District Court for the Southern District of West Virginia (1976–2026)
- Robin Davis (J.D. 1982), justice, Supreme Court of Appeals of West Virginia (1996–2018)
- Edwin F. Flowers (L 1954), justice, Supreme Court of Appeals of West Virginia (1975–1976)
- Joseph R. Goodwin (J.D. 1970), judge, United States District Court for the Southern District of West Virginia (1995–)
- Gina Marie Groh (J.D. 1989), judge, United States District Court for the Northern District of West Virginia (2012–)
- Charles Harold Haden II (L 1961), justice, Supreme Court of Appeals of West Virginia (1972–1975), judge, United States District Court for the Northern District of West Virginia (1975–1983) and United States District Court for the Southern District of West Virginia (1975–2004)
- Kenneth Keller Hall (J.D. 1948), judge, United States District Court for the Southern District of West Virginia (1971–1976), United States Court of Appeals for the Fourth Circuit (1976–1999)
- Elizabeth Virginia Hallanan (J.D. 1951), judge, United States District Court for the Southern District of West Virginia (1983–2004)
- John A. Hutchison (J.D. 1980), justice, Supreme Court of Appeals of West Virginia (2018–)
- Thomas E. Johnston (J.D. 1992), judge, United States District Court for the Southern District of West Virginia (2006–) and U.S. attorney, United States District Court for the Northern District of West Virginia (2001–2006)
- Irene Patricia Murphy Keeley (J.D. 1980), judge, United States District Court for the Northern District of West Virginia (1992–)
- Menis E. Ketchum (J.D. 1967), justice, Supreme Court of Appeals of West Virginia (2009–2018)
- William Matthew Kidd (L 1950), judge, United States District Court for the Southern District of West Virginia (1979–1983) and United States District Court for the Northern District of West Virginia (1983–1998)
- Robert Bruce King (J.D. 1968), judge, United States Court of Appeals for the Fourth Circuit (1998–) and U.S. attorney for the Southern District of West Virginia (1977–1981)
- Tom Kleeh (J.D. 1999), judge, United States District Court for the Northern District of West Virginia (2018–)
- Dennis Raymond Knapp (L 1940), judge, United States District Court for the Southern District of West Virginia (1970–1998)
- Jon D. Levy (J.D. 1979), chief judge, United States District Court for the District of Maine (2014–) and justice, Maine Supreme Judicial Court (2002–14)
- Haymond Maxwell (L 1901), justice, Supreme Court of Appeals of West Virginia (1929–1940)
- Robert Earl Maxwell (L 1949), judge, United States District Court for the Northern District of West Virginia (1965–2010) and U.S. attorney for the United States District Court for the Northern District of West Virginia (1961–1964)
- Spike Maynard (J.D. 1974), justice, Supreme Court of Appeals of West Virginia (1997–2008)
- Thomas McHugh (J.D. 1964), justice, Supreme Court of Appeals of West Virginia (1981–1997, 2009–2013)
- Carlos E. Mendoza (J.D. 1997), judge, United States District Court for the Middle District of Florida (2014–)
- Richard A. Robinson (J.D. 1984), chief justice of Connecticut Supreme Court (2013–)
- George M. Scott (L 1954), justice, Supreme Court of Appeals of West Virginia (1999–2000)
- Kai Scott (J.D. 1995), judge, United States District Court for the Eastern District of Pennsylvania (2023–)
- Robert Jackson Staker (L 1952), judge, United States District Court for the Southern District of West Virginia (1979–2005)
- Larry Starcher (J.D. 1967), justice, Supreme Court of Appeals of West Virginia (1997–2008)
- Stephanie Thacker (J.D. 1990), judge, United States Court of Appeals for the Fourth Circuit (2012–)
- Frank W. Volk (J.D. 1992), judge, United States District Court for the Southern District of West Virginia (2019–)
- Harry Evans Watkins (L 1923), judge, United States District Court for the Northern District of West Virginia and United States District Court for the Southern District of West Virginia (1937–1963)
- William Wooton (J.D. 1971), justice, Supreme Court of Appeals of West Virginia (2021–)
- Margaret Workman (J.D. 1974), justice, Supreme Court of Appeals of West Virginia (1989–1999, 2009–2020)
- Roderick C. Young (J.D. 1994), judge, United States District Court for the Eastern District of Virginia (2020–)

== Law ==
=== Attorneys general ===
- William W. Barron (L 1934), 27th attorney general of West Virginia (1957–1961), 26th governor of West Virginia (1961–1965)
- Chauncey H. Browning Jr. (L 1958), 29th attorney general of West Virginia (1969–1985)
- William G. Conley (L 1893), 15th attorney general of West Virginia (1908–1913), and 18th governor of West Virginia (1929–1933)
- William C. Marland (L 1947), 24th attorney general of West Virginia (1949–1952), 24th governor of West Virginia (1953–1957)
- Darrell McGraw (J.D. 1964), 33rd attorney general of West Virginia (1993–2013) and justice, Supreme Court of Appeals of West Virginia (1976–1988)
- Mario Palumbo (L 1957), 32nd attorney general of West Virginia (1991–1993)
- Edgar P. Rucker (L 1887), 12th attorney general of West Virginia (1897–1901)

=== Government ===
- William J. Ihlenfeld II (J.D. 1997), U.S. attorney, United States District Court for the Northern District of West Virginia (2010–2016, 2021–)
- H. Marshall Jarrett (J.D. 1969), director for the Executive Office for United States Attorneys, U.S. Department of justice
- William J. Powell (J.D. 1985), U.S. attorney, United States District Court for the Northern District of West Virginia (2017–2021)
- William S. Thompson (J.D. 1995), U.S. attorney for the United States District Court for the Southern District of West Virginia (2021–)
- Kasey Warner (J.D. 1980), United States attorney for the Southern District of West Virginia (2001–1905)

== Military ==
- Stephen Ailes (L 1936), 8th United States secretary of the Army (1964–1965)

== Politics ==
- Robert E. Lee Allen (L 1895), U.S. congressman from West Virginia (1923–1925)
- Tim Armstead (J.D. 1990), 54th speaker of West Virginia House of Delegates (2015–2018) and justice, Supreme Court of Appeals of West Virginia (2018–)
- Carl George Bachmann (L 1915), U.S. congressman from West Virginia and Minority Whip (1925–1933)
- William W. Barron (L 1934), 26th governor of West Virginia (1961–1965) and 27th attorney general of West Virginia (1957–1961)
- W. Robert Blair (L 1954), 63rd speaker of the Illinois House of Representatives (1971–1975)
- William Thomas Bland (L 1884), U.S. congressman for Missouri (1919–1921)
- Robert Charles Chambers (L 1977), 50th speaker of West Virginia House of Delegates (1987–1997) and judge, United States District Court for the Southern District of West Virginia (1997–)
- William G. Conley (L 1893), 18th governor of West Virginia (1929–1933) and 15th attorney general of West Virginia (1908–1913)
- Joseph S. Farland (L 1938), U.S. ambassador to Iran, Pakistan, Panama, Dominican Republic
- Roger Hanshaw (J.D. 2012), 55th speaker of the West Virginia House of Delegates (2018–)
- Robert Lynn Hogg (L 1916), U.S. congressman from West Virginia (1930–1933)
- George William Johnson (L 1896), U.S. congressman from West Virginia (1923–1925, 1933–1943)
- Jeffrey V. Kessler (J.D.), president, West Virginia State Senate (2011–2015)
- Harley M. Kilgore (L 1914), United States senator (1941–1956)
- Francis J. Love (J.D. 1932), U.S. congressman from West Virginia (1947–1949)
- William C. Marland (L 1947), 24th attorney general of West Virginia (1949–1952), 24th governor of West Virginia (1953–1957)
- JB McCuskey (J.D. 2009), 21st West Virginia state auditor (2017–)
- Alan Mollohan (J.D. 1970), U.S. congressman from West Virginia (1983–2011)
- Arch A. Moore, Jr. (L 1951), 28th and 30th governor of West Virginia (1969–1977, 1985–1989) and U.S. congressman from West Virginia (1957–1969)
- Ephraim F. Morgan (L 1897), 16th governor of West Virginia (1921–1925)
- Hunter Holmes Moss Jr. (L 1896), U.S. congressman from West Virginia (1913–1916)
- Matthew M. Neely (L 1902), U.S. congressman (1913–1921, 1945–1947), 21st governor of West Virginia (1941–1945), U.S. senator from West Virginia (1923–1929, 1931–1941, 1949–1958)
- William Smith O'Brien (L 1891), 17th secretary of state of West Virginia (1933–1948), U.S. congressman from West Virginia (1927–1929)
- Roy Earl Parrish (1910), West Virginia state senator (1915–1918)
- José Lorenzo Pesquera (L 1904), resident commissioner of Puerto Rico (1932–1933)
- Robert L. Ramsay (L 1901), U.S. congressman from West Virginia (1933–1939, 1941–1943, 1949–1953)
- Stuart F. Reed (L 1889), 14th secretary of state of West Virginia (1909–1917), congressman from West Virginia (1917–1925)
- Clyde See (J.D. 1970), 48th speaker of West Virginia House of Delegates (1979–1985)
- Harley O. Staggers, Jr. (L 1977), U.S. congressman from West Virginia (1983–1993)
- Rick Thompson (J.D. 1978), 52nd speaker of West Virginia House of Delegates (2007–2013)
- Mac Warner (J.D. 1982), 30th secretary of state of West Virginia (2017–)

== Sports ==
- Mike Florio (J.D. 1991), founder of ProFootballTalk.com
- George Ford (L 1896), first coach of Marshall Thundering Herd football (1903–1904)
