= West Virginia Law Review =

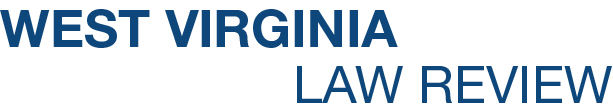
- Discipline: Law
- Language: English
- Edited by: Nicholas Gutmann

Publication details
- Former names: The West Virginia Bar, The Bar, West Virginia Law Quarterly and The Bar
- History: 1894-present
- Publisher: West Virginia University College of Law (United States)
- Frequency: Triannually

Standard abbreviations
- Bluebook: W. Va. L. Rev.
- ISO 4: W. Va. Law Rev.

Indexing
- ISSN: 0043-3268
- LCCN: 12004974
- OCLC no.: 803925706

Links
- Journal homepage; Online archive

The West Virginia Law Review is a triannual student-run law review published by the West Virginia University College of Law. It was established in 1894 and is the fourth oldest law review in the United States.

== History ==
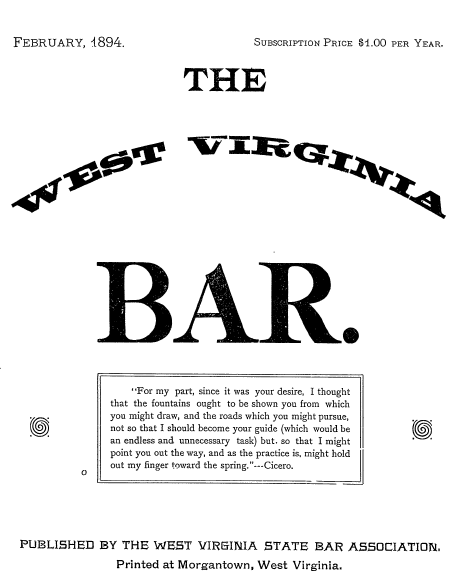
1894 cover

1894 advertisement rates

The journal underwent several name changes. It was established in 1894 as The West Virginia Bar by William P. Willey. The name was changed to The Bar in 1902. It was again changed in 1917 to the West Virginia Law Quarterly and The Bar and remained so until 1950 when it obtained its current title. As Willey was a prominent and active member of the West Virginia Bar Association, the early years of The Bar were closely associated with it. The Bar was at first funded by advertisements and subscriptions, and published monthly issues. Willey served as the editor-in-charge from 1894 until he retired in 1917. He began using the assistance of student editors in 1915.

In 1917, a faculty board took over the administration of the journal but increased the involvement of student editors by forming a Student Board of Editors in 1920. In 1951, Emanuel Magnuson became the first student editor-in-chief. Since then the law review has been run entirely by student editors. From 1979 to 2003 the journal issued an annual "National Coal Issue" devoted to coal law and policy.

In May 2013, the journal introduced its "Inaugural Energy Issue".

== Former editors ==
=== Judges ===
- Robert B. King (United States Court of Appeals for the Fourth Circuit)
- Herbert Stephenson Boreman (United States Court of Appeals for the Fourth Circuit)
- Stephanie Thacker (United States Court of Appeals for the Fourth Circuit)
- Arthur M. Recht (West Virginia Supreme Court of Appeals)
- Thomas E. McHugh (West Virginia Supreme Court of Appeals)
- Menis E. Ketchum (West Virginia Supreme Court of Appeals)
- Thomas B. Miller (West Virginia Supreme Court of Appeals)
- Charles Harold Haden II (West Virginia Supreme Court of Appeals)/(Chief District Court Judge of the (United States District Court for the Southern District of West Virginia)
- Jon D. Levy (Maine Supreme Judicial Court)
- John P. Bailey (United States District Court for the Northern District of West Virginia)
- W. Craig Broadwater (United States District Court for the Northern District of West Virginia)
- Irene Patricia Murphy Keeley (United States District Court for the Northern District of West Virginia)
- Thomas E. Johnston (United States District Court for the Southern District of West Virginia)
- Joseph Robert Goodwin (Chief District Court Judge of the (United States District Court for the Southern District of West Virginia)

=== Politicians ===
- Chauncey H. Browning, Jr. West Virginia Attorney General (1969-1985.
- Mike Callaghan Former Chairman of the West Virginia Democratic Party and former Secretary of the West Virginia Department of Environmental Protection.
- William C. Marland 24th governor of West Virginia (1953-1957) and West Virginia Attorney General (1949-1952)
- Mario Palumbo West Virginia Attorney General (1990-1992) and former state senator.
- Richard Thompson Former Speaker of the West Virginia House of Delegates
