= List of federal judges appointed by Gerald Ford =

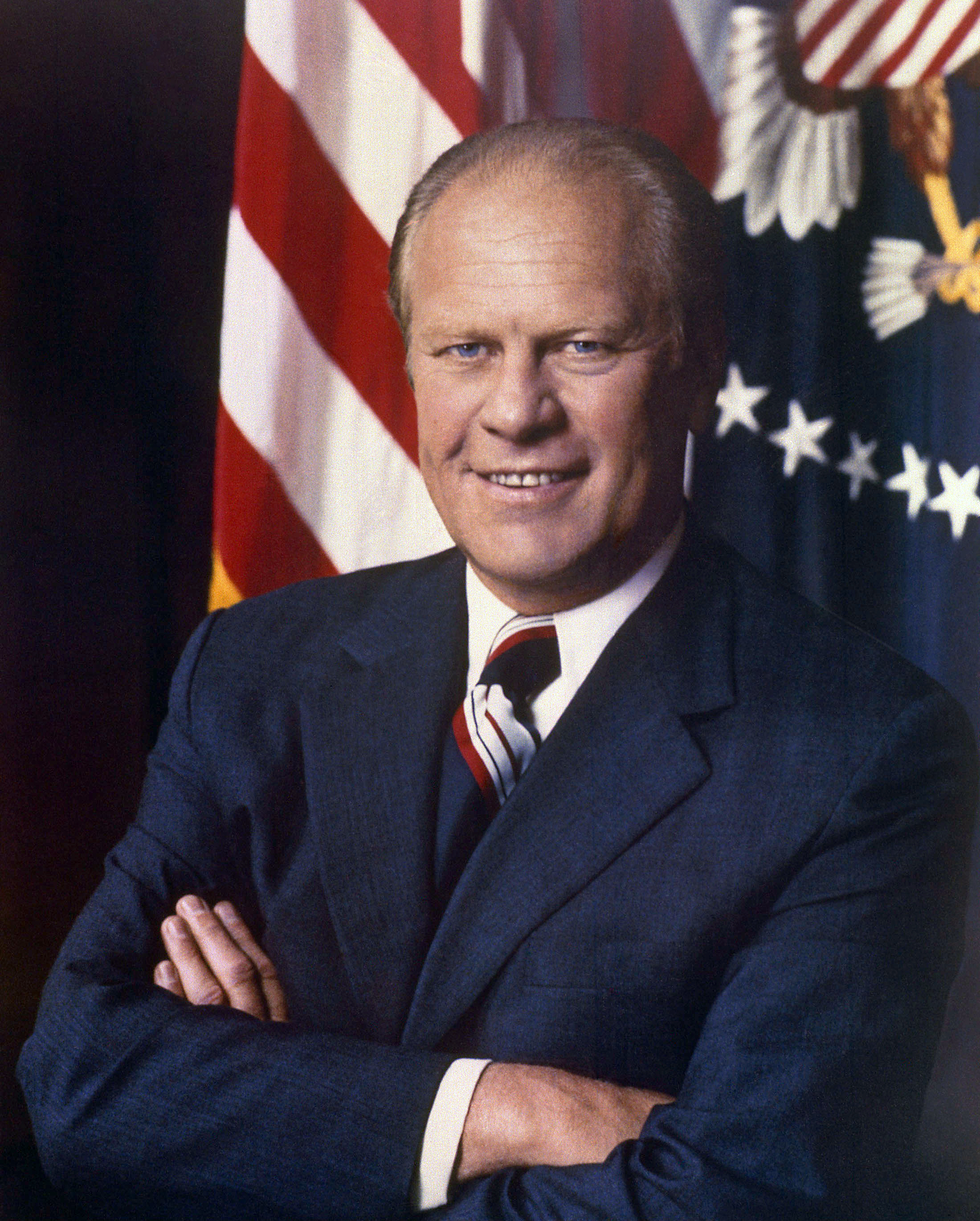
President Gerald Ford.

Following is a list of all Article III United States federal judges appointed by President Gerald Ford during his presidency. In total Ford appointed 65 Article III federal judges, including 1 Justice to the Supreme Court of the United States, 12 judges to the United States Courts of Appeals, and 52 judges to the United States district courts.

None of Ford's appointees remain in active service, however 1 appellate judge and 2 district judges remain on senior status. Three additional judges appointed by Ford to district courts remain on senior status as appellate judges by appointment of later presidents, as is one appellate judge appointed to the Supreme Court.

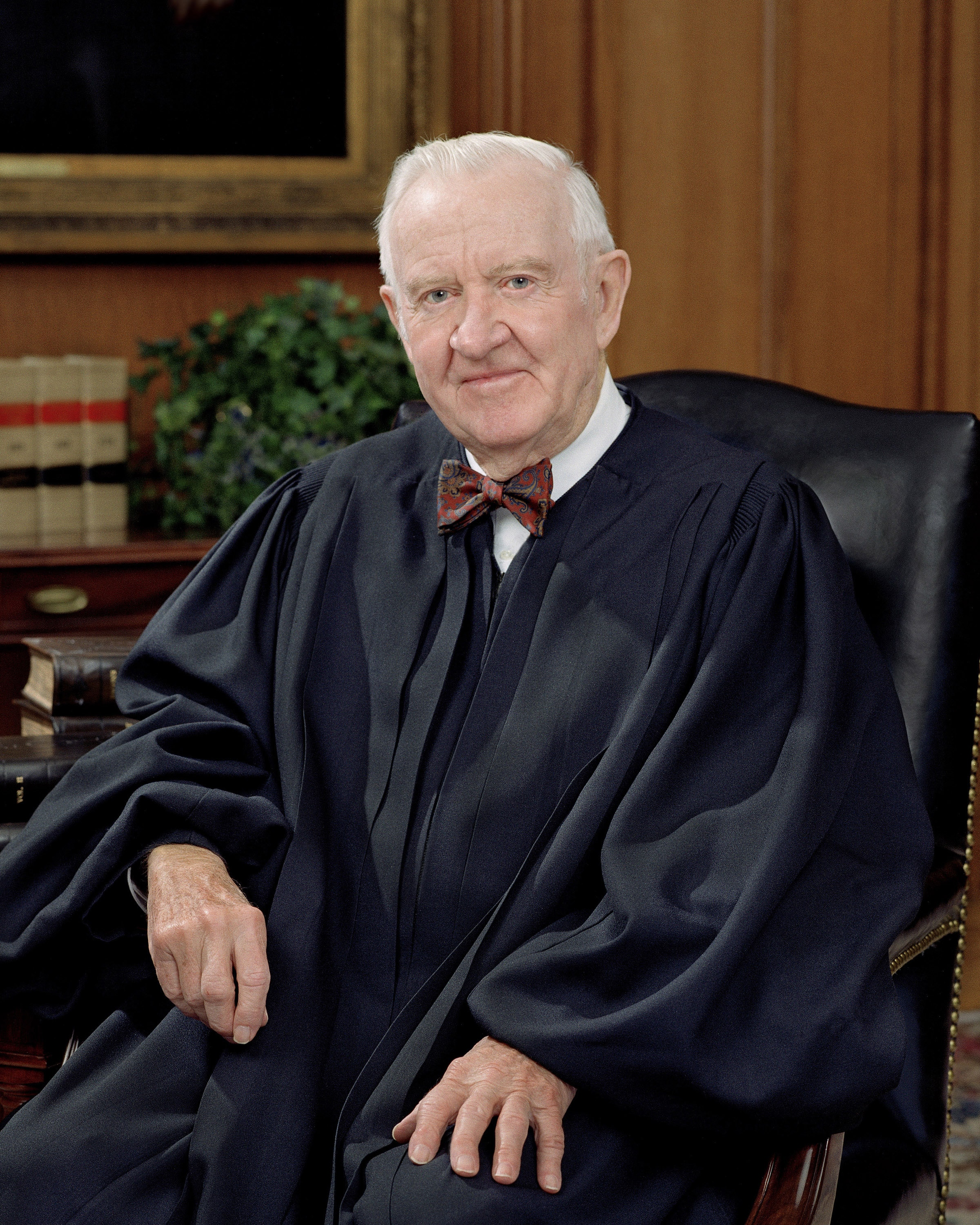
John Paul Stevens was Ford's only Supreme Court appointment.

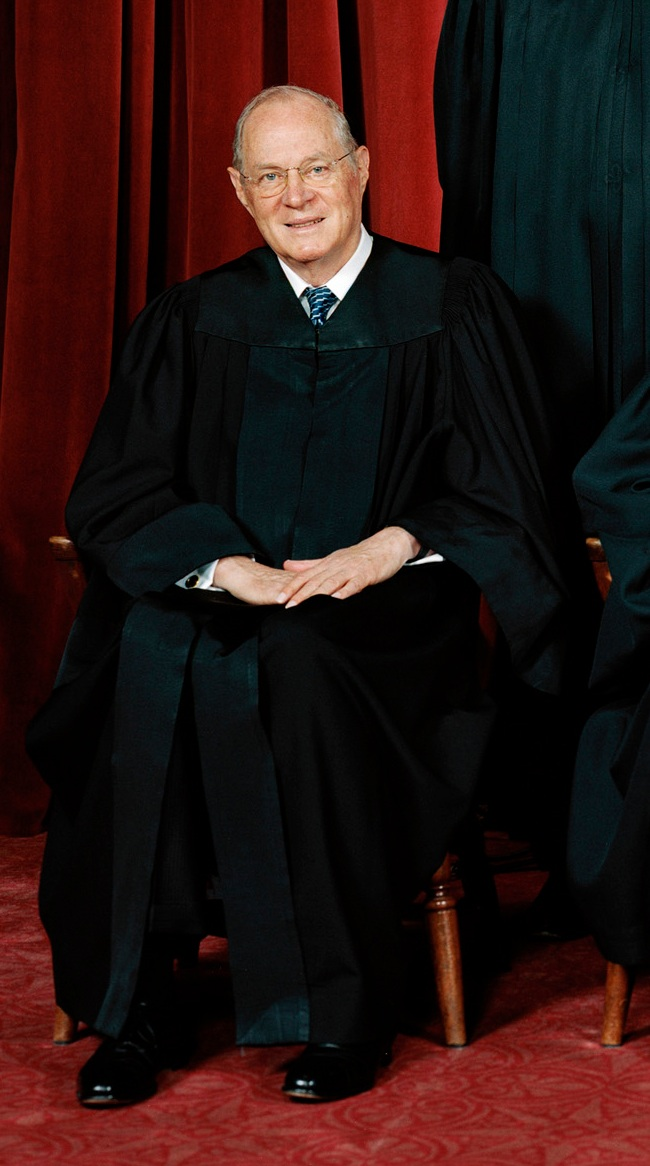
Anthony Kennedy, named by Ford to the United States Court of Appeals for the Ninth Circuit, was later elevated to the Supreme Court.

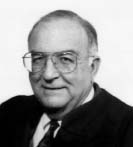
Ford appointed Juan R. Torruella to the United States District Court for the District of Puerto Rico; Torruella was later elevated to the United States Court of Appeals for the First Circuit.

== United States Supreme Court justices ==
#	Justice	Seat	State	Former justice	Nomination date	Confirmation date	Confirmation vote	Began active service	Ended active service	Ended retired service
1	John Paul Stevens	4	Illinois	William O. Douglas	November 28, 1975	December 17, 1975	98–0	December 17, 1975	June 29, 2010	July 16, 2019

== Courts of appeals ==
#	Judge	Circuit	Nomination date	Confirmation date	Began active service	Ended active service	Ended senior status
1	Murray Gurfein (Note: Nominated by Richard Nixon but appointed by Gerald Ford.)	Second	July 11, 1974	August 22, 1974	August 27, 1974	December 16, 1979	–
2	William J. Bauer	Seventh	December 11, 1974	December 19, 1974	December 20, 1974	October 31, 1994	December 15, 2025
3	Ellsworth Van Graafeiland	Second	December 11, 1974	December 20, 1974	December 21, 1974	May 11, 1985	November 20, 2004
4	J. Smith Henley	Eighth	December 11, 1974 (Note: Renominated on January 28, 1975.)	March 13, 1975	March 14, 1975	May 31, 1982	October 18, 1997
5	Anthony Kennedy	Ninth	March 3, 1975	March 20, 1975	March 24, 1975	February 17, 1988	Elevated
6	Thomas Meskill (Note: Initially nominated by Richard Nixon but renominated by Gerald Ford.)	Second	August 8, 1974 (Note: Originally nominated on August 8, 1974 by President Nixon. That nomination was not acted on. Renominated on November 18, 1974 by President Ford. That nomination was not acted on. Renominated on January 16, 1975.)	April 22, 1975	April 23, 1975	June 30, 1993	October 29, 2007
7	Gerald Bard Tjoflat	Fifth / Eleventh	November 3, 1975	November 20, 1975	November 21, 1975	November 19, 2019	Incumbent
8	Harlington Wood Jr.	Seventh	April 14, 1976	May 6, 1976	May 7, 1976	January 15, 1992	December 29, 2008
9	James Clinkscales Hill	Fifth / Eleventh	May 4, 1976	May 19, 1976	May 21, 1976	October 15, 1989	March 31, 2017
10	J. Blaine Anderson	Ninth	June 18, 1976	July 2, 1976	July 2, 1976	April 16, 1988	–
11	Kenneth Keller Hall	Fourth	August 26, 1976	September 1, 1976	September 3, 1976	February 24, 1998	July 8, 1999
12	Peter T. Fay	Fifth / Eleventh	June 11, 1976	September 17, 1976	September 21, 1976	January 19, 1994	January 31, 2021

== District courts ==
#	Judge	Court (Note: See List of United States district and territorial courts)	Nomination date	Confirmation date	Began active service	Ended active service	Ended senior status
1	Robert W. Warren (Note: Nominated by Richard Nixon but appointed by Gerald Ford.)	E.D. Wis.	August 8, 1974	August 22, 1974	August 27, 1974	August 1, 1991	August 20, 1998
2	Donald Alsop	D. Minn.	August 8, 1974	December 18, 1974	December 20, 1974	August 28, 1992	Incumbent
3	Edward N. Cahn	E.D. Pa.	November 18, 1974	December 18, 1974	December 20, 1974	December 31, 1998	–
4	James Paul Churchill	E.D. Mich.	December 2, 1974	December 18, 1974	December 20, 1974	December 31, 1989	June 29, 2020
5	Joseph Calvitt Clarke Jr.	E.D. Va.	December 11, 1974	December 19, 1974	December 20, 1974	July 31, 1991	May 6, 2004
6	H. Dale Cook	E.D. Okla. N.D. Okla. W.D. Okla.	December 2, 1974	December 18, 1974	December 20, 1974	January 1, 1992	September 22, 2008
7	James Martin Fitzgerald	D. Alaska	December 2, 1974	December 18, 1974	December 20, 1974	January 1, 1989	April 3, 2011
8	Joel Flaum	N.D. Ill.	November 18, 1974	December 18, 1974	December 20, 1974	June 1, 1983	Elevated
9	John F. Gerry	D.N.J.	November 18, 1974	December 18, 1974	December 20, 1974	October 1, 1994	March 10, 1995
10	William S. Sessions	W.D. Tex.	December 11, 1974	December 19, 1974	December 20, 1974	November 1, 1987	–
11	Juan R. Torruella (Note: Initially nominated by Richard Nixon but renominated by Gerald Ford.)	D.P.R.	May 28, 1974 (Note: Originally nominated on May 28, 1974 by President Nixon. That nomination was not acted on. Renominated on November 18, 1974 by President Ford.)	December 18, 1974	December 20, 1974	October 30, 1984	Elevated
12	John T. Elfvin	W.D.N.Y.	December 9, 1974	December 20, 1974	December 21, 1974	July 1, 1987	January 6, 2009
13	Alfred Younges Kirkland Sr.	N.D. Ill.	December 11, 1974	December 19, 1974	December 21, 1974	April 30, 1979	March 19, 2004
14	Henry Bramwell	E.D.N.Y.	December 11, 1974	December 20, 1974	December 26, 1974	October 1, 1987	May 28, 2010
15	Stanley Brotman	D.N.J.	January 27, 1975	March 13, 1975	March 14, 1975	April 23, 1990	February 21, 2014
16	Robert J. O'Conor Jr.	S.D. Tex.	March 17, 1975	April 24, 1975	April 25, 1975	September 30, 1984	–
17	Dick Yin Wong	D. Haw.	March 17, 1975	April 24, 1975	April 25, 1975	December 26, 1978	–
18	William Henry Stafford Jr.	N.D. Fla.	April 18, 1975	May 12, 1975	May 14, 1975	May 31, 1996	July 14, 2025
19	Richard Dean Rogers	D. Kan.	July 15, 1975	July 31, 1975	August 5, 1975	January 1, 1989	November 25, 2016
20	Clarence Addison Brimmer Jr.	D. Wyo.	July 23, 1975	September 15, 1975	September 16, 1975	September 27, 2006	October 23, 2014
21	Terry Shell	E.D. Ark. W.D. Ark.	July 25, 1975	September 15, 1975	September 16, 1975	June 25, 1978	–
22	Ralph Gordon Thompson	W.D. Okla.	September 24, 1975	October 9, 1975	October 14, 1975	December 16, 1999	August 6, 2007
23	Eugene Edward Siler Jr.	E.D. Ky. W.D. Ky.	September 19, 1975	November 11, 1975	November 13, 1975	September 20, 1991	Elevated
24	John F. Grady	N.D. Ill.	October 20, 1975	November 20, 1975	November 21, 1975	May 23, 1994	December 2, 2019
25	Charles Harold Haden II	N.D. W. Va. S.D. W. Va.	October 1, 1975	November 20, 1975	November 21, 1975	January 14, 1983; March 20, 2004	–
26	Patrick Higginbotham	N.D. Tex.	December 2, 1975	December 12, 1975	December 12, 1975	August 3, 1982	Elevated
27	George N. Leighton	N.D. Ill.	December 19, 1975	February 2, 1976	February 4, 1976	February 27, 1986	December 1, 1987
28	Charles S. Haight Jr.	S.D.N.Y.	March 2, 1976	March 26, 1976	March 29, 1976	September 23, 1995	Incumbent
29	John Michael Manos	N.D. Ohio	March 17, 1976	March 26, 1976	March 29, 1976	April 1, 1991	July 6, 2006
30	Gerard Louis Goettel	S.D.N.Y.	March 2, 1976	March 26, 1976	March 30, 1976	August 5, 1993	December 19, 2011
31	Phil McClellan McNagny Jr.	N.D. Ind.	June 24, 1975	May 6, 1976	May 7, 1976	March 28, 1981	–
32	George C. Pratt	E.D.N.Y.	April 13, 1976	May 6, 1976	May 7, 1976	June 29, 1982	Elevated
33	Charles Schwartz Jr.	E.D. La.	March 23, 1976	May 6, 1976	May 7, 1976	February 28, 1991	November 3, 2012
34	Morey Leonard Sear	E.D. La.	March 30, 1976	May 6, 1976	May 7, 1976	October 31, 2000	September 6, 2004
35	Ross N. Sterling	S.D. Tex.	April 13, 1976	May 6, 1976	May 7, 1976	January 14, 1988	–
36	Robert Mitsuhiro Takasugi	C.D. Cal.	April 14, 1976	May 6, 1976	May 7, 1976	September 30, 1996	August 4, 2009
37	Ralph B. Guy Jr.	E.D. Mich.	April 26, 1976	May 11, 1976	May 12, 1976	October 17, 1985	Elevated
38	Laughlin Edward Waters Sr.	C.D. Cal.	April 26, 1976	May 11, 1976	May 12, 1976	July 6, 1986	June 3, 2002
39	Maurice B. Cohill Jr.	W.D. Pa.	May 4, 1976	May 18, 1976	May 21, 1976	November 28, 1994	January 1, 2022
40	John Powers Crowley	N.D. Ill.	May 18, 1976	June 16, 1976	June 16, 1976	June 30, 1981	–
41	Mary Anne Richey	D. Ariz.	June 2, 1976	June 16, 1976	June 16, 1976	November 25, 1983	–
42	J. Waldo Ackerman	S.D. Ill. / C.D. Ill.	June 18, 1976	July 2, 1976	July 2, 1976	November 23, 1984	–
43	William Austin Ingram	N.D. Cal.	June 2, 1976	July 23, 1976	July 23, 1976	November 15, 1990	May 26, 2002
44	Cecil F. Poole	N.D. Cal.	June 18, 1976 (Note: Originally nominated on May 29, 1968 by President Johnson to a different seat on the same court. That nomination was not acted on. Renominated on January 9, 1969. That nomination was withdrawn by President Nixon on January 23, 1969. Renominated on June 18, 1976 by President Ford to a different seat on the same court.)	July 23, 1976	July 23, 1976	March 31, 1980	Elevated
45	William Schwarzer	N.D. Cal.	June 2, 1976	July 23, 1976	July 23, 1976	April 30, 1991	January 28, 2017
46	Marion Jones Callister	D. Idaho	July 19, 1976	August 26, 1976	September 1, 1976	June 6, 1989	June 24, 1997
47	John Thomas Copenhaver Jr.	S.D. W. Va.	August 26, 1976	September 1, 1976	September 3, 1976	November 1, 2018	May 12, 2026
48	Glen Morgan Williams	W.D. Va.	September 8, 1976	September 17, 1976	September 17, 1976	November 21, 1988	November 4, 2012
49	Sidney Aronovitz	S.D. Fla.	August 4, 1976	September 17, 1976	September 21, 1976	October 31, 1988	January 8, 1997
50	W. Eugene Davis	W.D. La.	August 5, 1976	September 17, 1976	September 21, 1976	December 9, 1983	Elevated
51	Vincent L. Broderick	S.D.N.Y.	August 26, 1976	September 23, 1976	October 4, 1976	December 1, 1988	March 3, 1995
52	Howard G. Munson	N.D.N.Y.	August 26, 1976	September 23, 1976	October 4, 1976	November 5, 1990	October 5, 2008

== Sources ==
- Federal Judicial Center
