= William S. Thompson =

American judge and lawyer (born 1969)

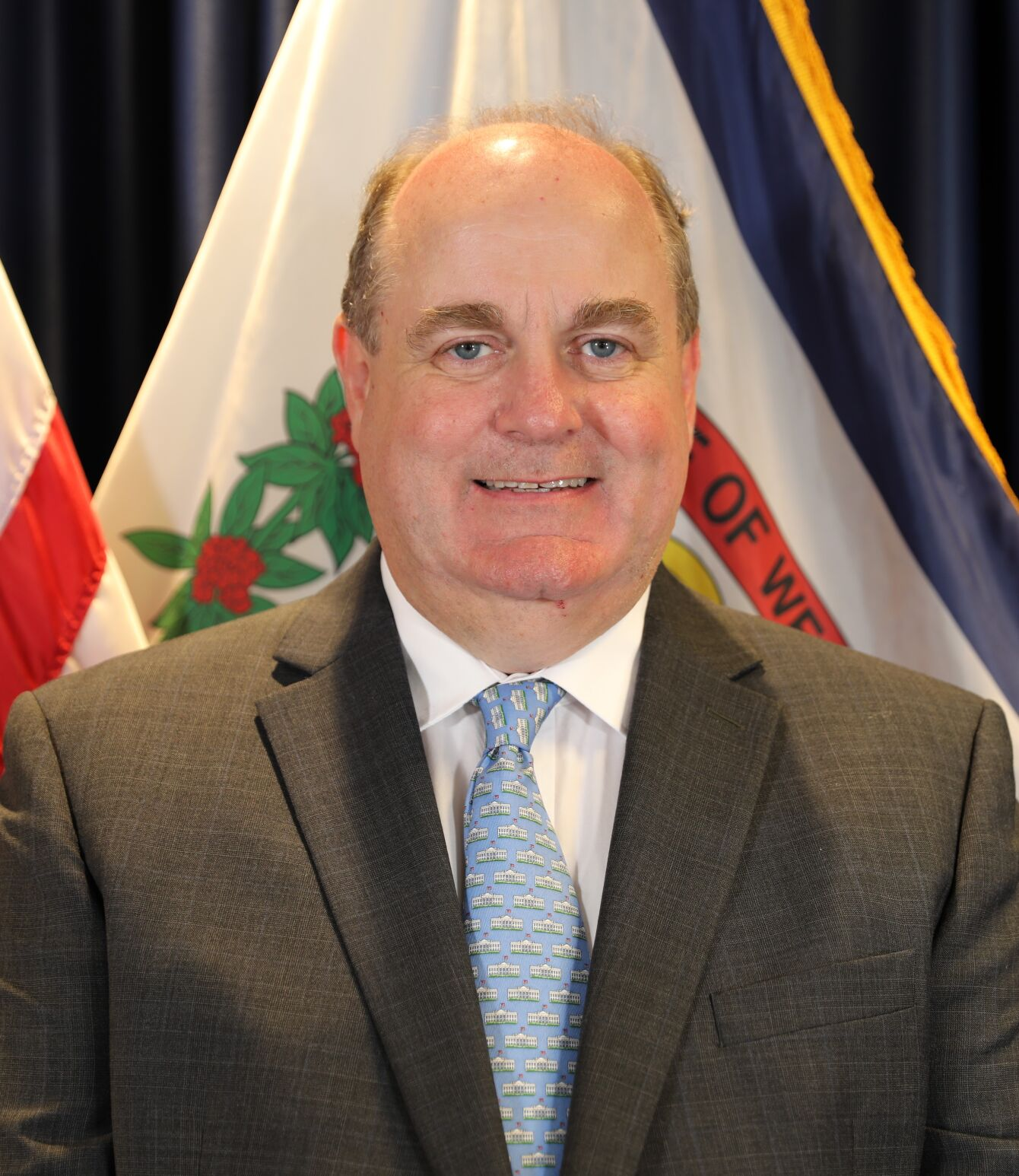
- Official portrait, 2021

United States Attorney for the Southern District of West Virginia
- In office October 13, 2021 – March 3, 2025
- President: Joe Biden; Donald Trump
- Preceded by: Michael B. Stuart; Lisa G. Johnston (acting)
- Succeeded by: Moore Capito

Judge of the 25th Judicial Circuit of West Virginia
- In office March 6, 2007 – August 18, 2021
- Appointed by: Joe Manchin
- Preceded by: E. Lee Schlaegel Jr.
- Succeeded by: Stacy L. Nowicki-Eldridge

Personal details
- Born: William Stewart Thompson; 1969 (age 56–57) Charleston, West Virginia, U.S.
- Children: 4
- Education: West Virginia University (BSE, JD)

William Stewart Thompson (born 1969) is an American attorney, judge, and academic administrator. He was the United States attorney for the Southern District of West Virginia from 2021 to 2025. From 2007 to 2021, he served as a judge on the 25th Judicial Circuit of West Virginia. Grundy is currently serving as the dean of students at Appalachian School of Law in Grundy, Virginia, as well as counsel at Spilman Thomas & Battle, PLLC in Charleston, West Virginia.

== Early life and education ==
Thompson was born in Charleston, West Virginia. He graduated as salutatorian from Scott High School. received his Bachelor of Science in Engineering from the West Virginia University in 1992 and his Juris Doctor from the West Virginia University College of Law in 1995.

== Career ==
In 1992, Thompson was a civil engineer for American Electric Power in Columbus, Ohio; he also served as president of Madison Healthcare, Incorporated from 1997 to 2007, and as vice president of Danville Lumber Company from 1994 to 2007. He was an associate at the law firm of Cook and Cook in Madison, West Virginia from 1995 to 2007. His primary focus was litigation, which included representing several hundred indigent clients in criminal defense and other matters.

=== 25th Judicial Circuit Judge ===
From 2007 to 2021, he served as a judge for the 25th Judicial Circuit of West Virginia after being appointed by West Virginia Governor Joe Manchin, to fill the vacancy left by the retirement of Judge E. Lee Schlaegel Jr. He was sworn in on March 6, 2007. While on the bench, Thompson gained a national reputation for presiding over several treatment courts, including the state’s first family treatment court. He was re-elected in 2008 and 2016. He resigned effective August 18, 2021, after being nominated as U.S. Attorney.

=== U.S. Attorney ===
On August 10, 2021, President Joe Biden nominated Thompson to be the United States Attorney for the Southern District of West Virginia. On September 30, 2021, his nomination was reported out of committee by voice vote. On October 5, 2021, his nomination was confirmed in the United States Senate by voice vote. On October 13, 2021, he was sworn in by Chief United States District Judge Thomas E. Johnston in a private ceremony.

=== Post U.S. Attorney career ===
In May 2025, Thompson became dean of students Appalachian School of Law in Grundy, Virginia. There he also holds the position of visiting professor, teaching constitutional law and appellate advocacy. Outside of teaching, he serves as counsel for Spilman Thomas & Battle, PLLC in their Charleston, West Virginia, office, where he primarily practices litigation, with an emphasis on alternative dispute resolution and white collar criminal defense.

Legal offices
Preceded by Michael B. Stuart; Lisa G. Johnston; Acting	United States Attorney for the Southern District of West Virginia; 2021–present	Incumbent
