= Carte Goodwin =

American attorney and politician (born 1974)

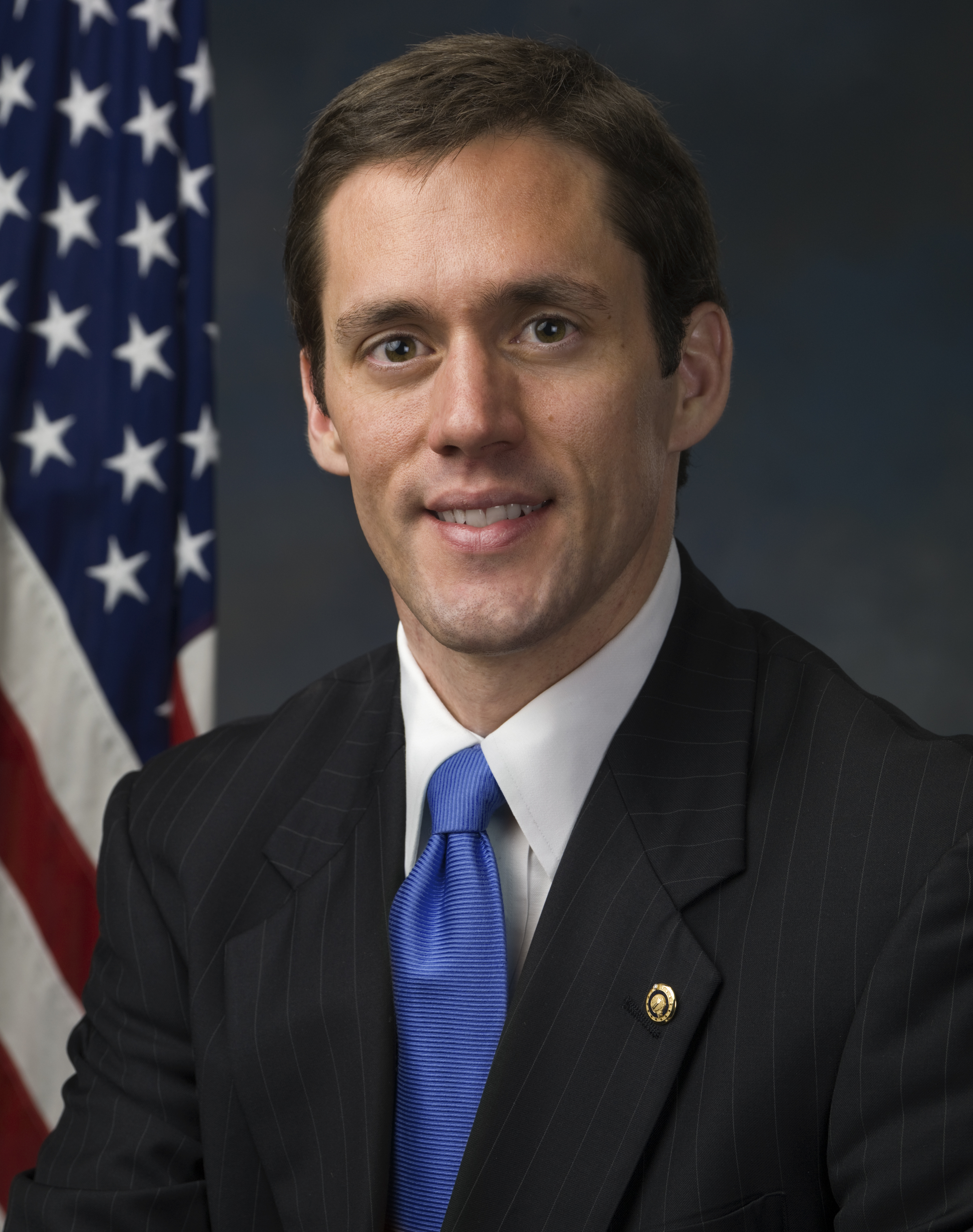
- Official portrait, 2010

United States Senator from West Virginia
- In office July 16, 2010 – November 15, 2010
- Appointed by: Joe Manchin
- Preceded by: Robert Byrd
- Succeeded by: Joe Manchin

Commissioner of the United States-China Economic and Security Review Commission
- In office 2011 – January 20, 2021

Personal details
- Born: Carte Patrick Goodwin; February 27, 1974 (age 52) Mount Alto, West Virginia, U.S.
- Party: Democratic
- Spouse: Rochelle Goodwin
- Children: 2
- Relatives: Joseph Goodwin (uncle); Booth Goodwin (cousin)
- Education: Marietta College (BA); Emory University (JD)
- Goodwin's voice Goodwin questioning witnesses at a Senate HELP Committee hearing about for-profit college financial aid. Recorded August 4, 2010

Carte Patrick Goodwin (born February 27, 1974) is an American attorney and politician who served as a United States senator from West Virginia in 2010. A member of the Democratic Party, he was appointed by Governor Joe Manchin on July 16, 2010 to fill the vacancy created by the death of Robert Byrd. He chose not to seek election to finish Byrd’s unexpired term. Goodwin left office on November 15, 2010 when Manchin was sworn in after being elected to the Senate.

Prior to his appointment as a United States senator, Goodwin served as Manchin's chief counsel. In 2008, he was named one of the "Ten Most Successful Young Executives in West Virginia" by Executive magazine. In 2010, Time named him one of the rising stars of American politics under 40, in their list of "40 under 40". After leaving the Senate, Goodwin joined the law firm of Frost Brown Todd. From 2011 to 2021, Goodwin served as a commissioner on the United States-China Economic and Security Review Commission.

== Early life and education ==
Goodwin was born on February 27, 1974, to Ellen (née Gibson) and Stephen Patrick Goodwin, and was raised in rural Mount Alto, West Virginia. He comes from a prominent West Virginia political family. Goodwin's father chaired the West Virginia University board of directors. His uncle, Joseph Robert Goodwin, served as Chief Judge of the United States District Court for the Southern District of West Virginia.

Goodwin graduated from Ripley High School in 1992, and graduated magna cum laude from Marietta College in 1996 where he earned a Bachelor of Arts in philosophy. Goodwin then enrolled at Emory University School of Law. As a law student, he served as an executive notes and comments editor for the Emory International Law Review. In 1999, Goodwin earned his Juris Doctor from Emory, graduating a member of the Order of the Coif.

== Career ==
After graduating from law school, Goodwin clerked for 4th Circuit Judge Robert Bruce King from 1999 to 2000. In 2000 Goodwin joined his family's law firm, Goodwin & Goodwin, working there until 2005. He rejoined the firm in 2009.

In 2004, Goodwin worked on then-Secretary of State Joe Manchin's successful campaign for governor. Goodwin was appointed chairman of the West Virginia School Building Authority by Manchin and later served as his chief counsel, from 2005 to 2009. As the governor's counsel, Goodwin assisted in the drafting of mine rescue and security measures, sparked by fatal accidents in the Aracoma and Sago Mines. In June 2009, Manchin appointed Goodwin chairman of the Independent Commission on Judicial Reform, which studied the need for changes in the judicial system in West Virginia.

In 2011, Senate Majority Leader Harry Reid appointed Goodwin to a two-year term as a commissioner of the United States-China Economic and Security Review Commission, a position to which he was re-appointed until 2021. He was reappointed in 2023.

=== U.S. Senate ===
On July 16, 2010, Manchin appointed Goodwin to the U.S. Senate seat vacated by the death of Senator Robert Byrd, until a special election could choose a permanent successor. Goodwin stated that he would not seek election to the seat in his own right, and that he would leave office once a new senator had been elected. Observers suggested that Goodwin had been appointed as a placeholder for Manchin, who subsequently won the special election to complete Byrd's term.

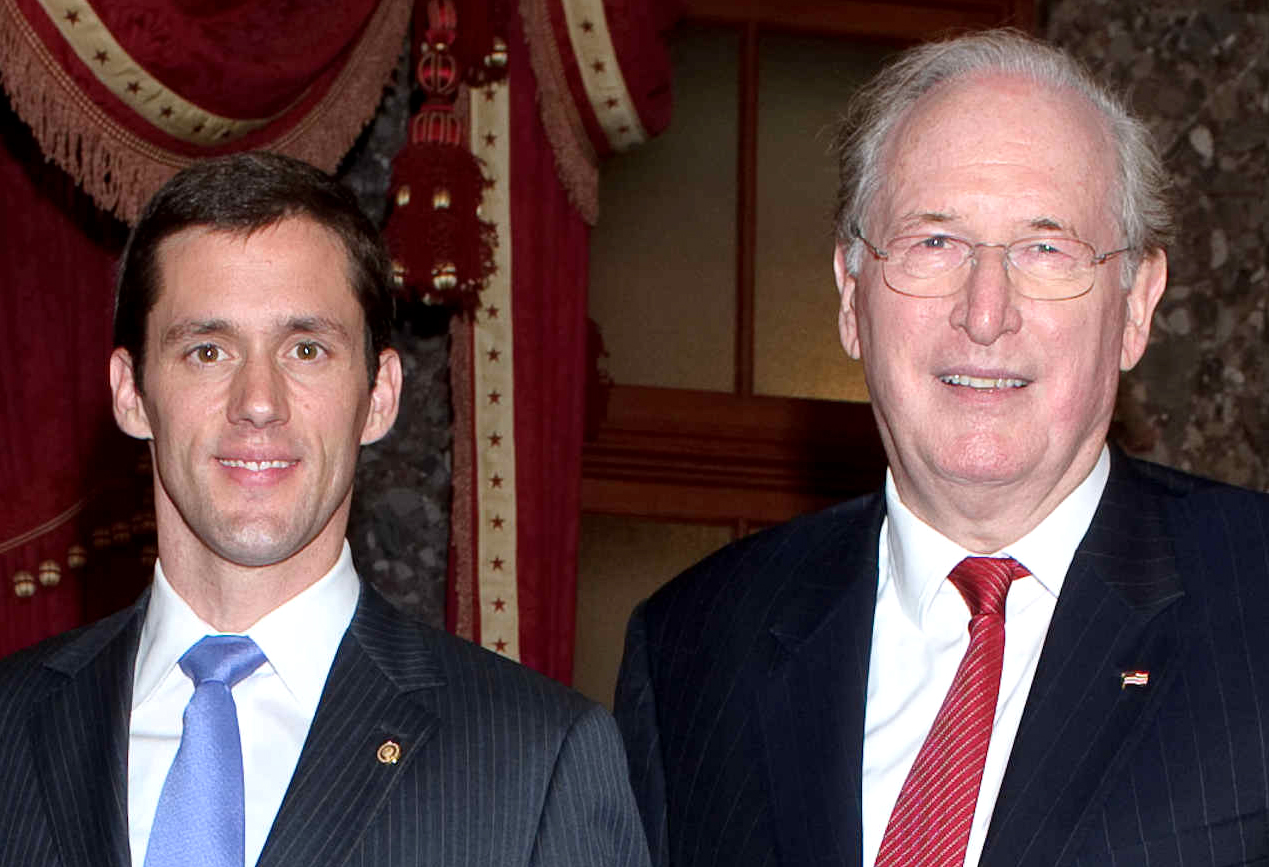
Goodwin with fellow West Virginia Senator Jay Rockefeller

Before being sworn in to office, Goodwin broke with Senate Democrats, stating he would not support their cap-and-trade bill.

Goodwin was sworn into the Senate on July 20, 2010, and quickly joined with fellow Democrats to pass an extension of unemployment benefits, an effort they previously were unable to pass due to a Republican filibuster. He voted to confirm Elena Kagan as an associate justice of the U.S. Supreme Court.

Goodwin's term expired on November 15, 2010, when Manchin was sworn in as a U.S. senator. During his short tenure, Goodwin served on the following committees:

- Committee on Armed Services
  - Subcommittee on Emerging Threats and Capabilities
  - Subcommittee on Readiness and Management Support
  - Subcommittee on Strategic Forces
- Committee on the Budget
- Health, Education, Labor, and Pensions
  - Subcommittee on Employment and Workplace Safety
  - Subcommittee on Primary Health and Aging
- Committee on Rules and Administration

=== Post-Senate career ===
Goodwin was mentioned as a possible candidate to run to succeed Senator Jay Rockefeller, who chose not to run for re-election in 2014. However, Goodwin said he had no intention of running, citing family concerns.

In 2021, U.S. Circuit Judge Robert Bruce King announced plans to assume senior status, but later rescinded those plans. Reports indicated that King preferred to have Goodwin, his former clerk, replace him and was displeased that the White House had a different potential nominee in mind.

After leaving the Senate, Goodwin joined the law firm of Frost Brown Todd, where he has served as member-in-charge for their Charleston, West Virginia, office and vice chair for the firm's national Appellate Practice Group. As of June 2023, Goodwin remains a partner at the firm.

== Personal life ==
Goodwin and his wife, Rochelle, have two children, a son named Wesley and a daughter named Anna. Rochelle Goodwin worked for West Virginia's U.S. Senator Jay Rockefeller as his state director.

Goodwin's cousin, Booth Goodwin, was appointed United States Attorney for the Southern District of West Virginia by President Barack Obama.

== Publications ==
- Goodwin, Carte. “Live, In Concert and Beyond: A New Standard of Contributory Copyright Infringement.” 13 Emory Int'l L. Rev. 345 (1999).

U.S. Senate
Preceded by Robert Byrd	U.S. Senator (Class 1) from West Virginia; 2010; Served alongside: Jay Rockefeller	Succeeded by Joe Manchin
Honorary titles
Preceded by George LeMieux	Baby of the Senate; 2010	Succeeded by George LeMieux
U.S. order of precedence (ceremonial)
Preceded by Sheila Frahm as Former U.S. Senator	Order of precedence of the United States	Succeeded by John Walsh as Former U.S. Senator
