= Booth Goodwin =

American attorney

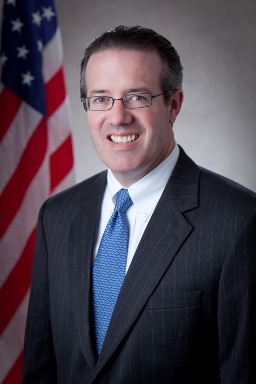
- Goodwin in 2010

United States Attorney for the Southern District of West Virginia
- In office June 25, 2010 – December 31, 2015
- President: Barack Obama
- Preceded by: Charles Miller (acting)
- Succeeded by: Michael B. Stuart

Personal details
- Born: Robert Booth Goodwin II; 1971 (age 54–55) Charleston, West Virginia, U.S.
- Party: Democratic
- Spouse: Amy Shuler (m. 1999)
- Relations: Joseph Goodwin (father); Carte Goodwin (cousin)
- Children: 2
- Education: West Virginia University (BA); Washington and Lee University (JD)

Robert Booth Goodwin II (born 1971) is an American attorney with Goodwin & Goodwin LLP in Charleston, West Virginia. He served as the United States Attorney for the Southern District of West Virginia from 2010 until 2015. Goodwin was a candidate for Governor of West Virginia in 2016.

== Early life and education ==
Goodwin was born in Charleston, West Virginia in 1971. He attended West Virginia University, where he graduated cum laude with a Bachelor of Science in economics 1993. He then earned his Juris Doctor from Washington and Lee University School of Law in 1996.

== Career ==
On January 20, 2010, President Barack Obama nominated Goodwin to serve as United States Attorney for the Southern District of West Virginia. He was confirmed by the United States Senate on May 26, 2010 and was sworn into office on June 25, 2010. Goodwin prosecuted Don Blankenship, securing a conviction for conspiring to undermine federal mine safety laws, which caused the Upper Big Branch Mine disaster.

On December 28, 2015, Goodwin announced that he would be stepping down from his position as U.S. Attorney effective at the end of 2015 and returning to private law practice. On January 1, 2016, Goodwin filed candidacy papers with the West Virginia Secretary of State's office to run for governor of West Virginia as a Democrat in the 2016 election. He lost the Democratic primary to Jim Justice, who went on to win the general election. Goodwin carried two counties, including his home county of Kanawha, as well as neighboring Jackson. He finished in second place with 25%, behind Justice and ahead of Jeff Kessler.

In 2018, Goodwin was treasurer of a super PAC designed to oppose the candidacies for U.S. Senate of Patrick Morrisey and Evan Jenkins and support the reelection of Joe Manchin.

== Personal life ==
Goodwin's father, Joseph Robert Goodwin, was appointed in 1995 by President Bill Clinton to serve as a federal judge for the United States District Court for the Southern District of West Virginia. Goodwin's cousin, Carte Goodwin, briefly served as the junior United States senator from West Virginia in 2010 when he was appointed to fill the vacancy caused by the death of Robert Byrd.

Booth Goodwin's wife, Amy Shuler Goodwin, is the mayor of Charleston, West Virginia, having taken office on January 7, 2019. This made Booth Goodwin the first gentleman of Charleston. They wed on April 17, 1999 and have two sons.

Legal offices
Preceded by Charles Miller; Acting	United States Attorney for the Southern District of West Virginia; 2010–2015	Succeeded by Michael B. Stuart
