= Elizabeth Virginia Hallanan =

American judge (1925–2004)

Senior Judge of the United States District Court for the Southern District of West Virginia
- In office December 1, 1996 – June 8, 2004

Judge of the United States District Court for the Southern District of West Virginia
- In office November 14, 1983 – December 1, 1996
- Appointed by: Ronald Reagan
- Preceded by: Dennis Raymond Knapp
- Succeeded by: Robert Charles Chambers

Personal details
- Born: January 10, 1925 Charleston, West Virginia
- Died: June 8, 2004 (aged 79) Charleston, West Virginia
- Education: Morris Harvey College (B.A.); West Virginia University College of Law (J.D.)

Elizabeth Virginia Hallanan (January 10, 1925 – June 8, 2004) was a United States district judge of the United States District Court for the Southern District of West Virginia. She was the first female judge in the state of West Virginia.

== Education and career ==
Born in Charleston, West Virginia, Hallanan received a Bachelor of Arts from Morris Harvey College (now the University of Charleston) in 1946 and a Juris Doctor from West Virginia University College of Law in 1951. She was a member of the West Virginia State Board of Education in Charleston from 1955 to 1957. She served in the West Virginia House of Delegates from 1957 to 1958, and was then appointed as an assistant commissioner of public instruction from 1958 to 1959, and then as a judge on the Juvenile Court, Kanawha County, West Virginia, from 1959 to 1961. She was the executive director of the West Virginia Association of Colleges and Universities from 1961 to 1969, and then Chairman of the West Virginia Public Service Commission from 1969 to 1975. She was in private practice in Charleston from 1975 to 1984.

== Federal judicial service ==
On November 8, 1983, Hallanan was nominated by President Ronald Reagan to a seat on the United States District Court for the Southern District of West Virginia vacated by Judge Dennis Raymond Knapp. She was confirmed by the United States Senate on November 11, 1983, and received her commission on November 14, 1983. She assumed senior status on December 1, 1996, serving in that capacity until her death, in Charleston, on June 8, 2004.

== Sources ==
Legal offices
Preceded by Dennis Raymond Knapp	Judge of the United States District Court for the Southern District of West Virginia; 1983–1996	Succeeded by Robert Charles Chambers
