= List of first minority male lawyers and judges in West Virginia =

This is a list of the first minority male lawyer(s) and judge(s) in West Virginia. It includes the year in which the men were admitted to practice law (in parentheses). Also included are men who achieved other distinctions such becoming the first in their state to graduate from law school or become a political figure.

== Firsts in West Virginia's history ==
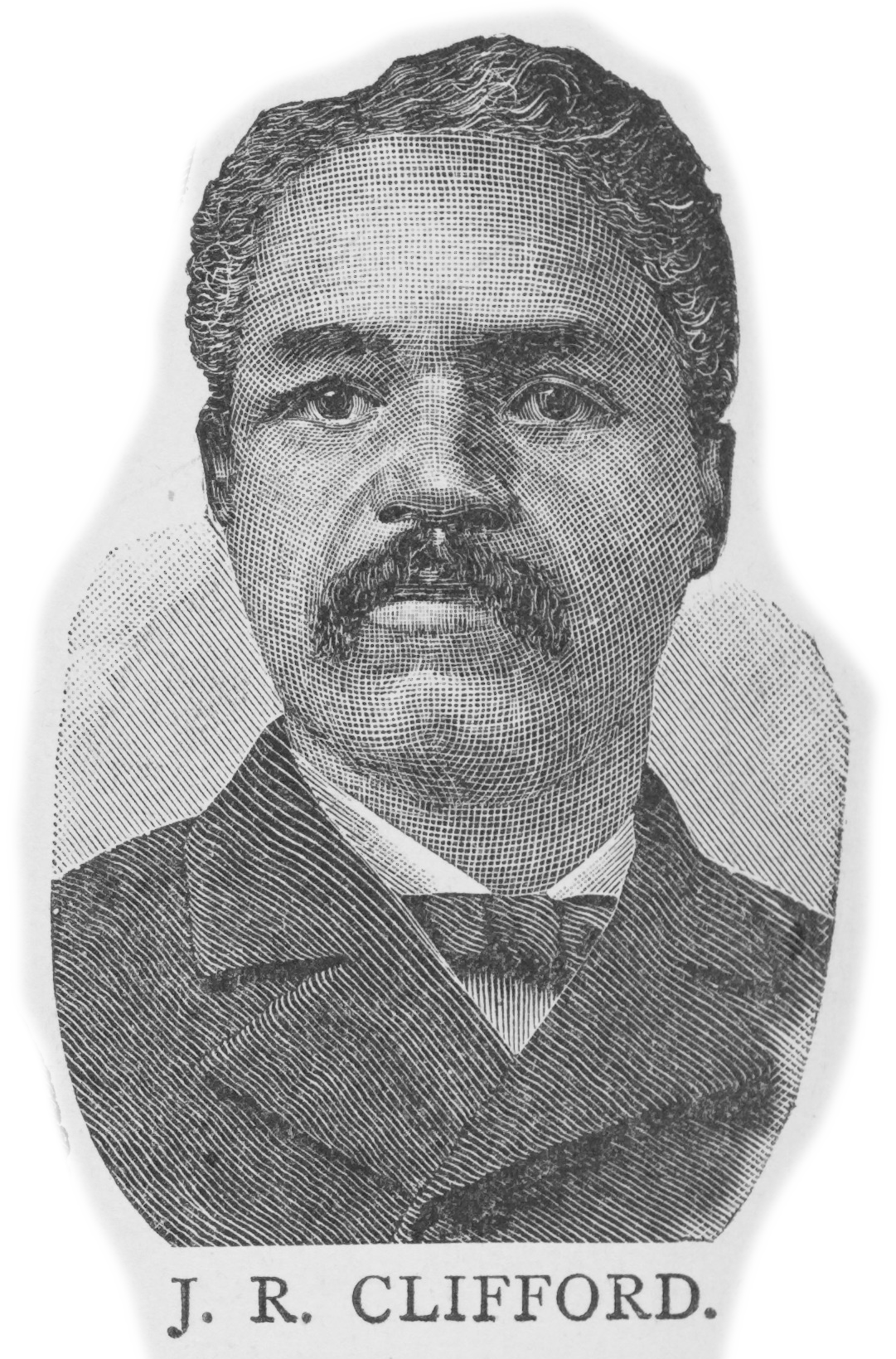
J. R. Clifford: First African American male lawyer in West Virginia (1887)

=== Lawyers ===
- First African American male: John H. Hill (1881)
- First African American male (actively practice): J.R. Clifford (1887)

=== State judges ===
- First African American male: Leon P. Miller (1968)
- First African American male (Supreme Court of Appeals of West Virginia): Franklin Cleckley (1969)

=== West Virginia State Bar ===
- Elliott G. Hicks: First African American male to serve as the President of the West Virginia State Bar (1998)

== Firsts in local history ==
- Larry Cann: First Italian American male lawyer in Harrison County, West Virginia
- Herman Canady: First African American male to serve as a Judge of the Kanawha Circuit Court (1982)
- James Knox Smith: First African American male lawyer in McDowell County, West Virginia (c. 1880s)
- Charles E. Price: First African American male to graduate from the West Virginia University College of Law (1949)
- Franklin Cleckley: First African American male to serve as a law professor at the West Virginia University College of Law (1969)
- Donald L. Pitts: First African American male to serve as the President of the Raleigh County Bar Association, West Virginia (1996)

== See also ==
- List of first minority male lawyers and judges in the United States

== Other topics of interest ==
- List of first women lawyers and judges in the United States
- List of first women lawyers and judges in West Virginia

== Bibliography ==
- Smith, J. Clay Jr. (1999). Emancipation: The Making of the Black Lawyer, 1844–1944. Philadelphia: University of Pennsylvania Press. ISBN 978-0-8122-1685-1. OCLC 491962363. Archived from the original on August 13, 2020 – via Google Books.
- Woodson, Carter G., ed. (January 1937). "Notes". The Journal of Negro History. 22 (1). Washington, D.C.: Association for the Study of Negro Life and History: 116–140. doi:10.1086/JNHv22n1p116. JSTOR 2714327. S2CID 224835338.
