= List of United States district and territorial courts =

There are 94 active United States district and territorial courts. Each of the 50 states has between one and four district courts, and the District of Columbia and Puerto Rico each has a district court.

The insular areas of Guam, the Northern Mariana Islands, and the United States Virgin Islands each has one territorial court; these courts are called "district courts" and exercise the same jurisdiction as district courts, but differ from district courts in that territorial courts are Article IV courts, with judges who serve ten-year terms rather than the lifetime tenure of judges of Article III courts, such as the district court judges. American Samoa does not have a district court or a federal territorial court, and so federal matters there are sent to either the District of Columbia or Hawaii.

== Definition ==
Map of the boundaries of the 94 United States District Courts

The district courts were established by Congress under Article III of the United States Constitution. The courts hear civil and criminal cases, and each is paired with a bankruptcy court. Appeals from the district courts are made to one of the 13 courts of appeals, organized geographically. The number of district courts in a court of appeals' circuit varies between one and thirteen, depending on the number of states in the region and the number of districts in each state. The formal naming convention for the district courts is "United States District Court for" followed by the district name. Each district court has one or more meeting places at which it holds hearings and conducts business. Many federal courthouses are named after notable judges, such as the Thurgood Marshall United States Courthouse in New York City or the Hugo L. Black United States Courthouse in Birmingham. The largest courthouse is the Thomas F. Eagleton United States Courthouse, which serves the Eastern District of Missouri.

The largest courts by number of judges are the Central District of California and the Southern District of New York, each with 28 judgeships. The smallest are the District for the Northern Mariana Islands and the District of Guam, with one judgeship each.

== Active courts ==
Key

Citation	The abbreviation used to refer to court decisions.
Established	The date the district court was established as a court or the date it was subdivided from a larger district.
Judges	The number of judgeships authorized for the district.
Meeting places	The number of locations at which the court hears cases.
Counties	The number of counties or parishes in a state from which the court hears cases. (Note: In Virginia, includes independent cities.)

Region	Citation	Court of Appeals	Established	Judges	Meeting places	Counties	Chief judge
Northern District of Alabama	N.D. Ala.	11th	1824	8	8	31	Madeline Haikala
Middle District of Alabama	M.D. Ala.	11th	1839	3	3	23	R. Austin Huffaker Jr.
Southern District of Alabama	S.D. Ala.	11th	1824	3	2	13	Jeff Beaverstock
District of Alaska	D. Alaska	9th	1958	3	5	All	Sharon L. Gleason
District of Arizona	D. Ariz.	9th	1910	13	6	All	Jennifer Zipps
Eastern District of Arkansas	E.D. Ark.	8th	1851	5	3	42	Kristine Baker
Western District of Arkansas	W.D. Ark.	8th	1851	3	6	34	Timothy L. Brooks
Central District of California	C.D. Cal.	9th	1966	28	4	7	Dolly Gee
Eastern District of California	E.D. Cal.	9th	1966	6	3	34	Troy L. Nunley
Northern District of California	N.D. Cal.	9th	1886	14	4	15	Yvonne Gonzalez Rogers
Southern District of California	S.D. Cal.	9th	1850	13	1	2	Cynthia Bashant
District of Colorado	D. Col. or D. Colo.	10th	1876	7	8	All	Regina M. Rodriguez
District of Connecticut	D. Conn.	2nd	1789	8	5	All	Michael P. Shea
District of Delaware	D. Del.	3rd	1789	4	1	All	Colm Connolly
District of the District of Columbia	D.D.C.	D.C.	1863	15	1	N/A	James Boasberg
Northern District of Florida	N.D. Fla. or N.D. Fl.	11th	1847	4	6	23	Allen Winsor
Middle District of Florida	M.D. Fla. or M.D. Fl.	11th	1962	15	8	35	Marcia Morales Howard
Southern District of Florida	S.D. Fla. or S.D. Fl.	11th	1847	18	5	9	Cecilia Altonaga
Northern District of Georgia	N.D. Ga.	11th	1848	11	4	46	Leigh Martin May
Middle District of Georgia	M.D. Ga.	11th	1926	4	7	70	Leslie Abrams Gardner
Southern District of Georgia	S.D. Ga.	11th	1848	3	6	43	R. Stan Baker
District of Guam	D. Guam	9th	1951	1	1	N/A	Frances Tydingco-Gatewood
District of Hawaii	D. Haw.	9th	1959	4	1	All	Derrick Watson
District of Idaho	D. Idaho	9th	1890	2	4	All	Amanda Brailsford
Northern District of Illinois	N.D. Ill.	7th	1855	23	4	18	Virginia Mary Kendall
Central District of Illinois	C.D. Ill.	7th	1978	4	6	46	Colin S. Bruce
Southern District of Illinois	S.D. Ill.	7th	1855	4	4	38	Staci M. Yandle
Northern District of Indiana	N.D. Ind.	7th	1928	5	4	32	Holly A. Brady
Southern District of Indiana	S.D. Ind.	7th	1928	5	5	60	James R. Sweeney II
Northern District of Iowa	N.D. Iowa	8th	1882	2	6	52	C. J. Williams
Southern District of Iowa	S.D. Iowa	8th	1882	3	6	47	Stephanie M. Rose
District of Kansas	D. Kan.	10th	1861	6	9	All	John W. Broomes
Eastern District of Kentucky	E.D. Ky.	6th	1901	6	9	67	David Bunning
Western District of Kentucky	W.D. Ky.	6th	1901	5	4	53	David J. Hale
Eastern District of Louisiana	E.D. La.	5th	1849	12	2	13	Wendy Vitter
Middle District of Louisiana	M.D. La.	5th	1971	3	1	9	Shelly Dick
Western District of Louisiana	W.D. La.	5th	1881	7	6	42	Terry A. Doughty
District of Maine	D. Me.	1st	1789	3	2	All	Lance E. Walker
District of Maryland	D. Md.	4th	1789	10	4	All	George L. Russell III
District of Massachusetts	D. Mass.	1st	1789	13	4	All	Denise J. Casper
Eastern District of Michigan	E.D. Mich.	6th	1863	15	5	34	Stephen Murphy III
Western District of Michigan	W.D. Mich.	6th	1863	4	6	49	Hala Y. Jarbou
District of Minnesota	D. Minn.	8th	1858	7	6	All	Eric C. Tostrud
Northern District of Mississippi	N.D. Miss.	5th	1838	3	7	37	Debra M. Brown
Southern District of Mississippi	S.D. Miss.	5th	1838	6	7	45	Halil Suleyman Ozerden
Eastern District of Missouri	E.D. Mo.	8th	1857	9	3	49	Stephen R. Clark
Western District of Missouri	W.D. Mo.	8th	1857	7	5	66	Brian C. Wimes
District of Montana	D. Mont.	9th	1889	3	11	All	Brian Morris
District of Nebraska	D. Neb.	8th	1867	3	3	All	Brian C. Buescher
District of Nevada	D. Nev.	9th	1865	7	6	All	Andrew P. Gordon
District of New Hampshire	D.N.H.	1st	1789	3	2	All	Samantha D. Elliott
District of New Jersey	D.N.J.	3rd	1789	17	6	All	Renée Marie Bumb
District of New Mexico	D.N.M.	10th	1910	7	3	All	Kenneth J. Gonzales
Eastern District of New York	E.D.N.Y.	2nd	1865	15	4	5	Margo Kitsy Brodie
Northern District of New York	N.D.N.Y.	2nd	1814	5	8	32	Brenda K. Sannes
Southern District of New York	S.D.N.Y.	2nd	1814	28	3	8	Laura Taylor Swain
Western District of New York	W.D.N.Y.	2nd	1900	4	5	17	Elizabeth A. Wolford
Eastern District of North Carolina	E.D.N.C.	4th	1872	4	7	44	Richard E. Myers II
Middle District of North Carolina	M.D.N.C.	4th	1927	4	3	24	Catherine Eagles
Western District of North Carolina	W.D.N.C.	4th	1872	5	5	32	Martin Karl Reidinger
District of North Dakota	D.N.D.	8th	1890	2	4	All	Peter D. Welte
District of the Northern Mariana Islands	D.N. Mar. I.	9th	1977	1	1	N/A	Ramona Villagomez Manglona
Northern District of Ohio	N.D. Ohio	6th	1855	11	5	40	Sara Elizabeth Lioi
Southern District of Ohio	S.D. Ohio	6th	1855	8	5	48	Sarah D. Morrison
Eastern District of Oklahoma	E.D. Ok. or E.D. Okla.	10th	1906	2	8	26	John F. Heil III
Northern District of Oklahoma	N.D. Ok. or N.D. Okla.	10th	1925	4	5	11	John F. Heil III
Western District of Oklahoma	W.D. Ok. or W.D. Okla.	10th	1906	7	10	40	Scott L. Palk
District of Oregon	D. Or. or D. Ore.	9th	1859	6	7	All	Michael J. McShane
Eastern District of Pennsylvania	E.D. Pa.	3rd	1818	22	5	9	Wendy Beetlestone
Middle District of Pennsylvania	M.D. Pa.	3rd	1901	6	5	33	Matthew W. Brann
Western District of Pennsylvania	W.D. Pa.	3rd	1818	10	3	25	Cathy Bissoon
District of Puerto Rico	D.P.R.	1st	1966	7	3	All	Raúl M. Arias-Marxuach
District of Rhode Island	D.R.I.	1st	1790	3	1	All	John J. McConnell Jr.
District of South Carolina	D.S.C.	4th	1789	10	11	All	Sherri Lydon
District of South Dakota	D.S.D.	8th	1889	3	5	All	Roberto Lange
Eastern District of Tennessee	E.D. Tenn.	6th	1802	5	4	41	Travis R. McDonough
Middle District of Tennessee	M.D. Tenn.	6th	1839	4	3	32	William L. Campbell Jr.
Western District of Tennessee	W.D. Tenn.	6th	1802	5	3	22	Sheryl H. Lipman
Eastern District of Texas	E.D. Tex.	5th	1857	8	7	43	Amos Mazzant
Northern District of Texas	N.D. Tex.	5th	1879	12	7	100	David C. Godbey
Southern District of Texas	S.D. Tex.	5th	1902	19	7	43	Randy Crane
Western District of Texas	W.D. Tex.	5th	1857	13	8	68	Alia Moses
District of Utah	D. Utah	10th	1894	5	4	All	Jill Parrish
District of Vermont	D. Vt.	2nd	1791	2	7	All	Christina Reiss
District of the Virgin Islands	D.V.I.	3rd	1936	2	2	N/A	Robert A. Molloy
Eastern District of Virginia	E.D. Va.	4th	1819	11	4	63	M. Hannah Lauck
Western District of Virginia	W.D. Va.	4th	1819	4	7	70	Elizabeth K. Dillon
Eastern District of Washington	E.D. Wash.	9th	1905	4	4	20	Stanley Bastian
Western District of Washington	W.D. Wash.	9th	1905	7	3	19	David Estudillo
Northern District of West Virginia	N.D. W. Va.	4th	1901	3	5	32	Tom Kleeh
Southern District of West Virginia	S.D. W. Va.	4th	1901	5	6	23	Frank W. Volk
Eastern District of Wisconsin	E.D. Wis.	7th	1870	5	3	28	Pamela Pepper
Western District of Wisconsin	W.D. Wis.	7th	1870	2	5	44	James D. Peterson
District of Wyoming	D. Wyo.	10th	1890	3	6	All	Kelly H. Rankin

== Defunct courts ==
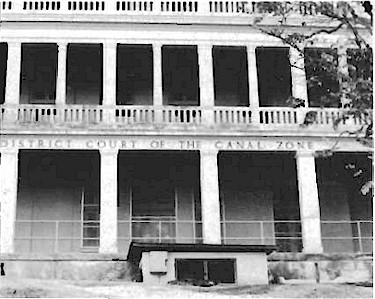
District of the Canal Zone Courthouse in Panama City, Panama

Note: Defunct courts do not include courts consisting of an entire state that were later subdivided.

Name	Region(s)	Citation	Established	Disestablished
District of Edenton	North Carolina	—	1794	1797
District of New Bern	North Carolina	—	1794	1797
District of Wilmington	North Carolina	—	1794	1797
District of East Jersey	New Jersey	—	1801	1802
District of West Jersey	New Jersey	—	1801	1802
District of Potomac	Maryland, Virginia, DC	—	1801	1802
District of Norfolk	Virginia	—	1801	1802
District of Albemarle	North Carolina	—	1802	1872
District of Cape Fear	North Carolina	—	1802	1872
District of Pamptico	North Carolina	—	1802	1872
District of Orleans	Louisiana	—	1804	1812
Eastern District of Illinois	Illinois	E.D. Ill.	1905	1978
District of China	China	—	1906	1943
Eastern District of South Carolina	South Carolina	E.D.S.C.	1911	1965
Western District of South Carolina	South Carolina	W.D.S.C.	1911	1965
District of the Canal Zone	Panama	D.C.Z.	1914	1982
District of Berlin	West Berlin	D.Berlin	1955	1990

== Subdivided courts ==
Name	Citation	Established	Subdivided
District of Alabama	D. Ala.	April 21, 1820	March 10, 1824
District of Arkansas	D. Ark.	June 15, 1836	March 3, 1851
District of California	D. Cal.	July 27, 1866	August 5, 1886
District of Florida	D. Fla.	March 3, 1845	February 23, 1847
District of Georgia	D. Ga.	September 24, 1789	August 11, 1848
District of Illinois	D. Ill.	March 3, 1819	February 13, 1855
District of Indiana	D. Ind.	March 3, 1817	April 21, 1928
District of Iowa	D. Iowa	March 3, 1845	July 20, 1882
District of Kentucky	D. Ky.	September 24, 1789; March 8, 1802	February 13, 1801; February 12, 1901
District of Louisiana	D. La.	April 8, 1812; February 13, 1845; July 27, 1866	March 3, 1823; March 3, 1849; March 3, 1881
District of Michigan	D. Mich.	July 1, 1836	February 24, 1863
District of Mississippi	D. Miss.	April 3, 1818	June 18, 1838
District of Missouri	D. Mo.	March 16, 1822	March 3, 1857
District of New York	D.N.Y.	September 24, 1789	April 9, 1814
District of North Carolina	D.N.C.	June 4, 1790; March 3, 1797	June 9, 1794; April 29, 1802
District of Ohio	D. Ohio	February 19, 1803	February 10, 1855
District of Pennsylvania	D. Pa.	September 24, 1789	April 20, 1818
District of Tennessee	D. Tenn.	January 31, 1797; March 8, 1802	February 13, 1801; April 29, 1802
District of Texas	D. Tex.	December 29, 1845	February 21, 1857
District of Virginia	D. Va.	September 24, 1789; March 8, 1802; June 11, 1864	February 13, 1801; February 4, 1819; February 3, 1871
District of Washington	D. Wash.	April 5, 1890	March 2, 1905
District of West Virginia	D.W.Va.	June 11, 1864	January 22, 1901
District of Wisconsin	D. Wis.	May 29, 1848	June 30, 1870

== See also ==
- List of United States federal courthouses
- List of former United States district courts
