= Cleckley =

Cleckley is a surname. Notable people with the surname include:

- Franklin Cleckley (1940–2017), American jurist
- Hervey M. Cleckley (1903–1984), American psychiatrist
