= Franklin Cleckley =

American judge

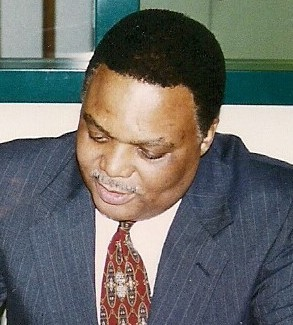

Justice of the Supreme Court of Appeals of West Virginia
- In office September 6, 1994 – November 5, 1996
- Appointed by: Gaston Caperton
- Preceded by: Thomas B. Miller
- Succeeded by: Robin Davis

Personal details
- Born: Franklin Dorrah Cleckley; August 1, 1940 Huntington, West Virginia, U.S.
- Died: August 14, 2017 (aged 77) Morgantown, West Virginia, U.S.
- Education: Anderson University; Indiana University School of Law; Harvard Law School; University of Exeter

Franklin Dorrah Cleckley (August 1, 1940 – August 14, 2017) was an American law professor and judge. He was Arthur B. Hodges Professor of Law at West Virginia University College of Law. He taught at the law school from 1969 to 2013. He held the endowed professorship emeritus.

Cleckley was the first African-American to serve as a justice of the West Virginia Supreme Court of Appeals. Governor Gaston Caperton appointed Cleckley to the bench in 1994. He served on the Court until 1996.

== Personal background ==
Cleckley was born in Huntington, West Virginia, on August 1, 1940, but was raised in McDowell County, West Virginia. He received an A.B. degree from Anderson College in 1962, a J.D. degree from Indiana University School of Law in 1965, and a LL.M. degree from Harvard Law School in 1969. He also did post-graduate studies at the University of Exeter in England.

== Professional background ==
Cleckley served three years in the United States Navy during the Vietnam War as a Judge Advocate General. While serving as a Navy JAG officer he earned the reputation, given by the United States Secretary of Defense, as being the most sought after attorney in Vietnam.

In 1969, Cleckley became the first African-American to join the faculty at West Virginia University College of Law. Justice Cleckley taught courses in evidence, criminal procedure and civil rights. He served as a visiting professor at Syracuse University, the University of Maryland, the University of Mississippi, the William & Mary Law School, Louisiana State, and Mercer University.

== Honors and awards ==
Justice Cleckley established the Franklin D. Cleckley Foundation in 1990, for the purpose of providing assistance for the educational and employment needs of people with prior criminal records. He has been honored with many awards that include: the West Virginia Civil Liberties Union "Civil Libertarian of the Year Award"; the West Virginia Common Cause Award for Public Service; the "Civil Rights Award" from the West Virginia Human Rights Commission; the West Virginia NAACP's Thurgood Marshall Award; the Neil S. Bucklew Award for Social Justice; and the West Virginia Chapter of the National Association of Social Workers Public Citizen of the Year Award.

The Justice Franklin D. Cleckley Fellowship was named and created in his honor by the West Virginia University College of Law, in conjunction with the University of Chicago Law School. The fellowship provides a two-year position with the West Virginia Innocence Project. In 1992 the "Franklin D. Cleckley Symposium" was created by West Virginia University for the purpose of having leading members of the civil rights community speak at the university.

== Writings ==
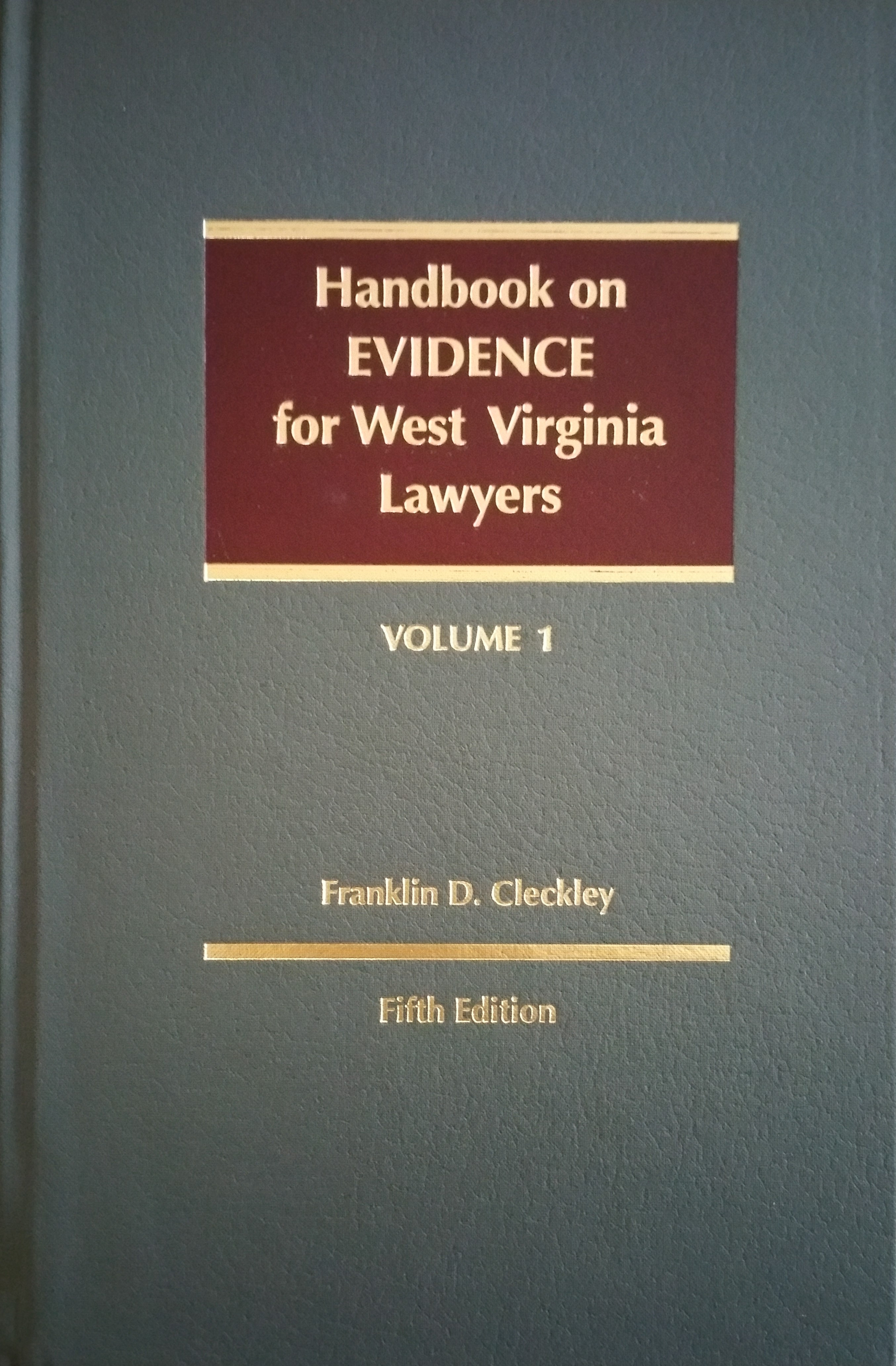
Cleckley's two volume Evidence Handbook

=== Opinions ===
Cleckley wrote over 100 majority opinions for the Supreme Court, in addition to numerous concurring opinions and dissents. He was also the original drafter of the West Virginia Rules of Criminal Procedure, the West Virginia Rules of Evidence, and the drafter of the 1984 Revisions of the Local Rules of United States District Court for the Northern District of West Virginia.

=== Other works ===
Cleckley was the author of the Handbook on Evidence for West Virginia Lawyers and the Handbook on West Virginia Criminal Procedure. He co-authored the Litigation Handbook on West Virginia Rules of Civil Procedure, Health Care and the Law, and Introduction to the West Virginia Criminal Justice System and Its Laws.

Cleckley authored several law review articles for the West Virginia Law Review, including "A Free Market Analysis of the Effects of Medical Malpractice Damage Cap Statutes: Can We Afford to Live with Inefficient Doctors?" (1991–92); "Clearly Erroneous: The Fourth Circuit's Decision to Uphold Removal of a State-Bar Disciplinary Proceeding Under the Federal Officer Removal Statute" (1989–90); "A Modest Proposal: A Psychotherapist-Patient Privilege for West Virginia" (1990–91); and "Tribute to a Champion: Thurgood Marshall" (1991–92).; He wrote a foreword entitled "Never Again" (1996) for an issue of the Race and Ethnic Ancestry Law Digest (later the Washington and Lee Journal of Civil Rights and Social Justice).

== Death ==
Cleckley died at his home in Morgantown, West Virginia, on August 14, 2017, at the age of 77.

== See also ==
- List of African-American jurists
- List of first minority male lawyers and judges in West Virginia
