= List of first women lawyers and judges in West Virginia =

This is a list of the first women lawyer(s) and judge(s) in West Virginia. It includes the year in which the women were admitted to practice law (in parentheses). Also included are women who achieved other distinctions such becoming the first in their state to graduate from law school or become a political figure.

== Firsts in West Virginia's history ==
=== Lawyer ===
- First female: Agnes Westbrook Morrison (1895)

=== State judges ===
- First female: Elizabeth Hallanan (1951) in 1959
- First African American female (circuit court): Irene Berger (1979) in 1994
- First female (Fourth Circuit Court of Appeals): Stephanie Thacker (1990)

=== Federal judges ===
- First female (U.S. Magistrate Judge): Mary Stanley in 1992
- First African American female (U.S. District Court for the Southern District of West Virginia): Irene Berger (1979) in 2009
- First female (Chief Judge for Bankruptcy Court; U.S. District Court for the Southern District of West Virginia): B. McKay Mignault in 2022

=== Assistant United States Attorney ===
- First female: Mary Stanley around 1977
- First female (Northern District of West Virginia): Betsy C. Jividen in 2009

=== Deputy Attorney General ===
- First female: Marianne Stonestreet

=== Assistant Attorney General ===
- First female: Virginia Mae Brown (1947) from 1952 to 1961

=== West Virginia State Bar Association ===
- First female (president): Barbara Baxter from 1994 to 1995
- First African American female (president): Meshea Poore in 2017

=== West Virginia Judicial Association ===
- First female (president): Jennifer Bailey in 2022

== Firsts in local history ==
- Theresa Cogar Turner: First female to become a Judge of the Family Court Judge for Lewis, Braxton, and Upshur Counties, West Virginia (2016)
- Kathi McBee: First female magistrate in Barbour County, West Virginia (1996)
- Janet Steele (1977): First female judge in Fayette County, West Virginia
- Alice Johnson McChesney (1922): First female lawyer in Charleston, West Virginia [Kanawha County, West Virginia]
- Elizabeth Aileen Hatfield (1933): First female lawyer in Logan County, West Virginia
- Rhonda Wade: First female prosecutor in Marshall County, West Virginia
- Marye L. Wright: First African American male to graduate from the West Virginia University College of Law (1976)
- Kristina "Kris" Raynes: First female prosecutor in Putnam County, West Virginia (2023)

== See also ==
- List of first women lawyers and judges in the United States
- Timeline of women lawyers in the United States
- Women in law

== Other topics of interest ==
- List of first minority male lawyers and judges in the United States
- List of first minority male lawyers and judges in West Virginia
