= Irene Berger =

American judge (born 1954)

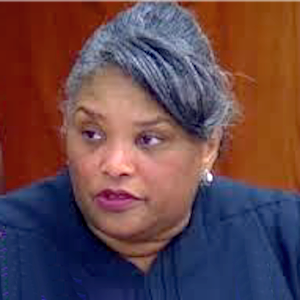

Judge of the United States District Court for the Southern District of West Virginia
- Incumbent
- Assumed office November 9, 2009
- Appointed by: Barack Obama
- Preceded by: David A. Faber

Personal details
- Born: Irene Cornelia Berger; September 27, 1954 (age 71) Faraday, West Virginia, U.S.
- Education: West Virginia University (BA, JD)

Irene Cornelia Berger (born September 27, 1954) is a United States district judge of the United States District Court for the Southern District of West Virginia.

== Early life and education ==
A native of Faraday in McDowell County, West Virginia, Berger graduated from West Virginia University in 1976 with a Bachelor of Arts degree in mathematics and from West Virginia University College of Law with a Juris Doctor in 1979.

== Career ==
After graduating from law school, Berger worked as a staff attorney for the Legal Aid Society of Charleston, where her clients largely were low-income individuals facing domestic, consumer and tenant-landlord disputes. She held that position from June 1979 until January 1982. In February 1982, Berger became assistant prosecuting attorney for Kanawha County. She held that position for more than 12 years. In May 1994, Berger joined the United States Attorney's office for the Southern District of West Virginia as an assistant United States attorney. In July 1994, West Virginia Gov. Gaston Caperton appointed Berger to be a Kanawha County circuit judge.

=== Federal judicial service ===
On July 8, 2009, Berger was nominated by President Barack Obama to serve as a United States District Judge of the United States District Court for the Southern District of West Virginia, to replace David A. Faber, who assumed senior status. The United States Senate confirmed Berger on October 27, 2009, by a 97–0 vote. She received her commission on November 9, 2009. She is the first African-American female federal judge in West Virginia's history.

== See also ==
- List of African-American federal judges
- List of African-American jurists
- List of first women lawyers and judges in West Virginia

Legal offices
Preceded by David A. Faber	Judge of the United States District Court for the Southern District of West Virginia; 2009–present	Incumbent
