= William Matthew Kidd =

American judge

Senior Judge of the United States District Court for the Northern District of West Virginia
- In office January 15, 1990 – December 20, 1998

Judge of the United States District Court for the Northern District of West Virginia
- In office January 14, 1983 – January 15, 1990
- Appointed by: operation of law
- Preceded by: Seat established by 96 Stat. 2601
- Succeeded by: Frederick Pfarr Stamp Jr.

Judge of the United States District Court for the Southern District of West Virginia
- In office December 21, 1979 – January 14, 1983
- Appointed by: Jimmy Carter
- Preceded by: Seat established by 92 Stat. 1629
- Succeeded by: Seat abolished

Personal details
- Born: William Matthew Kidd; June 15, 1918 Burnsville, West Virginia
- Died: December 20, 1998 (aged 80) Morgantown, West Virginia
- Education: West Virginia University College of Law (LLB)

William Matthew Kidd (June 15, 1918 – December 20, 1998) was a United States district judge of the United States District Court for the Northern District of West Virginia and the United States District Court for the Southern District of West Virginia.

== Education and career ==
Born in Burnsville, West Virginia, Kidd was in the United States Navy during World War II, from 1942 to 1945. He received a Bachelor of Laws from West Virginia University College of Law in 1950. He was a member of the West Virginia House of Delegates from 1950 to 1952. He was in private practice in West Virginia from 1952 to 1974. He was the prosecuting attorney of Braxton County, West Virginia from 1962 to 1970. He was a Judge of the 14th Judicial Circuit of West Virginia from 1974 to 1976. He was Chief Judge of the 14th Judicial Circuit from 1976 to 1979.

== Federal judicial service ==
Kidd was nominated by President Jimmy Carter on November 30, 1979, to the United States District Court for the Southern District of West Virginia, to a new seat created by 92 Stat. 1629. He was confirmed by the United States Senate on December 20, 1979, and received his commission on December 21, 1979. On January 14, 1983, Kidd was reassigned by operation of law to the United States District Court for the Northern District of West Virginia. He assumed senior status on January 15, 1990, serving in that status until his death on December 20, 1998, in Morgantown, West Virginia.

== Sources ==
Legal offices
Preceded by Seat established by 92 Stat. 1629	Judge of the United States District Court for the Southern District of West Virginia; 1979–1983	Succeeded by Seat abolished
Preceded by Seat established by 96 Stat. 2601	Judge of the United States District Court for the Northern District of West Virginia; 1983–1990	Succeeded by Frederick Pfarr Stamp Jr.
