= Robert Charles Chambers =

American judge (born 1952)

Chuck Chambers
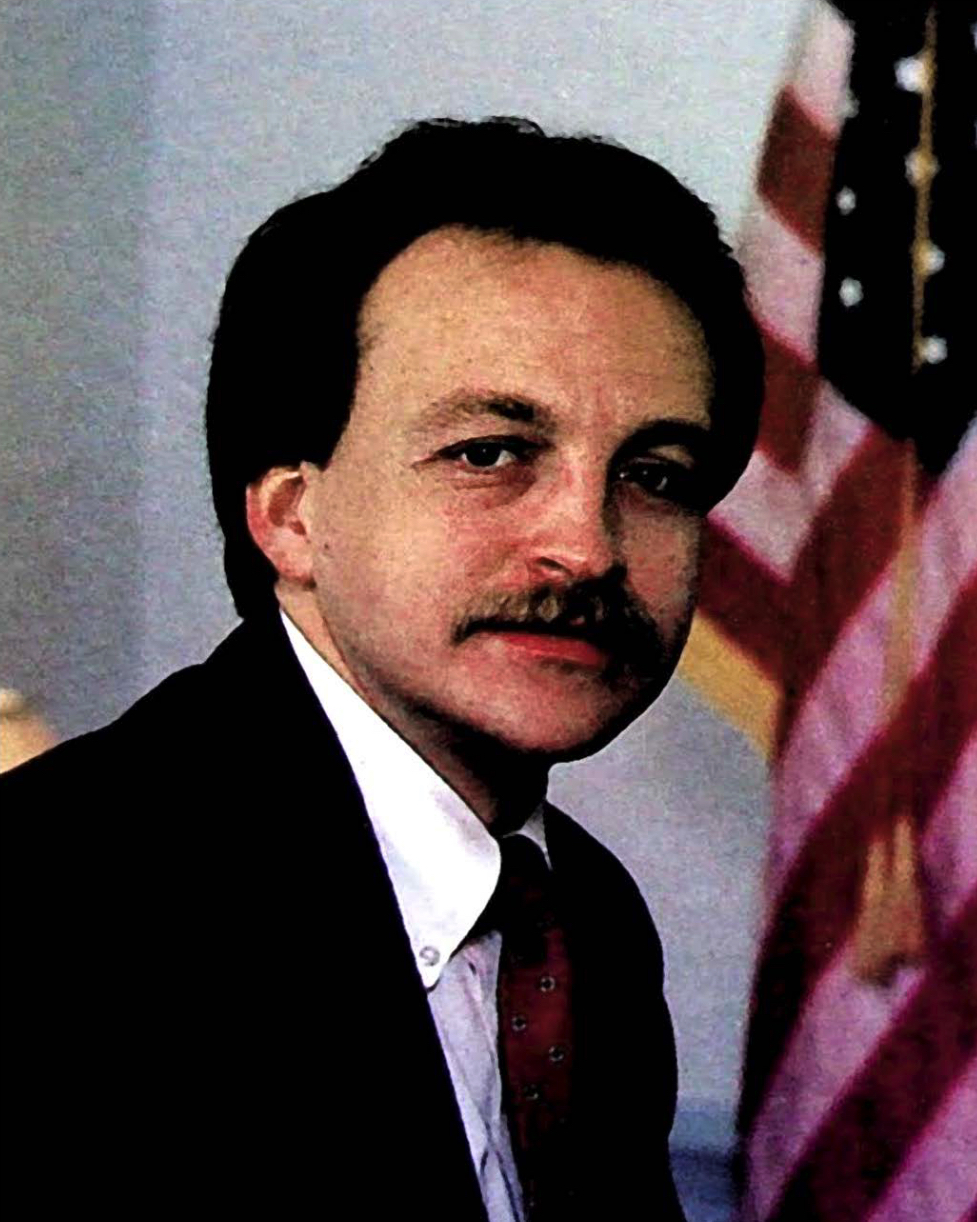

Chief Judge of the U.S. District Court for the Southern District of West Virginia
- In office 2012–2017
- Preceded by: Joseph R. Goodwin
- Succeeded by: Thomas E. Johnston

Judge of the United States District Court for the Southern District of West Virginia
- Incumbent
- Assumed office September 18, 1997
- Appointed by: Bill Clinton
- Preceded by: Elizabeth Virginia Hallanan

50th Speaker of the West Virginia House of Delegates
- In office 1987–1997
- Preceded by: Joseph Albright
- Succeeded by: Robert S. Kiss

Personal details
- Born: Robert Charles Chambers; August 27, 1952 (age 73) Williamson, West Virginia, U.S.
- Party: Democratic
- Education: Marshall University (AB); West Virginia University (JD)

Robert Charles Chambers (born August 27, 1952) is a United States district judge of the United States District Court for the Southern District of West Virginia.

== Education and career ==
Chambers was born in Williamson, West Virginia. He received an Artium Baccalaureus degree from Marshall University in 1974, and a Juris Doctor from West Virginia University College of Law in 1977. He was in private practice in Charleston, West Virginia from 1977 to 1997, and was legal counsel to the West Virginia State Senate in 1978. He was also a Delegate to the West Virginia House of Delegates from 1978 to 1996 and Speaker from 1986 to 1996.

=== Federal judicial service ===
On June 5, 1997, Chambers was nominated by President Bill Clinton to a seat on the United States District Court for the Southern District of West Virginia vacated by Elizabeth Virginia Hallanan. He was confirmed by the United States Senate on September 5, 1997, and received his commission on September 18, 1997. He served as Chief Judge from 2012 to 2017.

== Sources ==
Political offices
Preceded by Joseph Albright	Speakers of the West Virginia House of Delegates; 1987–1997	Succeeded by Robert S. Kiss
Legal offices
Preceded by Elizabeth Virginia Hallanan	Judge of the United States District Court for the Southern District of West Virginia; 1997–present	Incumbent
Preceded by Joseph R. Goodwin	Chief Judge of the United States District Court for the Southern District of West Virginia; 2012–2017	Succeeded by Thomas E. Johnston
