= John Thomas Copenhaver Jr. =

American judge (1925–2026)

Senior Judge of the United States District Court for the Southern District of West Virginia
- In office November 1, 2018 – May 12, 2026

Judge of the United States District Court for the Southern District of West Virginia
- In office September 3, 1976 – November 1, 2018
- Appointed by: Gerald Ford
- Preceded by: Kenneth Keller Hall
- Succeeded by: Frank W. Volk

Personal details
- Born: September 29, 1925 Charleston, West Virginia, U.S.
- Died: May 12, 2026 (aged 100) Charleston, West Virginia, U.S.
- Spouse: Camille Copenhaver
- Children: 3
- Education: The Citadel (attended); West Virginia University (AB, LLB)

Military service
- Branch/service: United States Army
- Service years: 1944–1946
- Rank: Staff Sergeant
- Unit: Americal Division
- Conflict: World War II; Philippines campaign (1944–1945)

John Thomas Copenhaver Jr. (September 29, 1925 – May 12, 2026) was a United States district judge of the United States District Court for the Southern District of West Virginia. At the time of his death, Copenhaver was the last actively serving district judge appointed by President Gerald Ford.

== Early life ==
Copenhaver was born in Charleston, West Virginia, on September 29, 1925. His father, John T. Copenhaver Sr. was mayor of Charleston, West Virginia, and twice a Republican candidate for governor of the state. According to the Charleston Gazette-Mail, his father "was known as 'Jumping John' for his colorful and sometimes controversial behavior." His mother was Ruth Cherrington, who served for 16 years on the Charleston city council and 8 years as council president.

He was educated at the Kentucky Military Institute. He attended The Citadel from 1942 to 1944.

During World War II, he was in the army from 1944 to 1946, rising to the rank of staff sergeant. He served in the U.S. Army's Americal Division during the second Philippines campaign.

He received an Artium Baccalaureus degree from West Virginia University in 1947 and a Legum Baccalaureus degree from West Virginia University College of Law in 1950.

== Legal career ==
After law school, he became a law clerk to Judge Ben Moore of the United States District Court for the Southern District of West Virginia from 1950 to 1951. He was in private practice in Charleston from 1951 to 1958, and a referee in bankruptcy for the Southern District of West Virginia from 1958 to 1973. Copenhaver was both an adjunct professor at the West Virginia University College of Law and a faculty member of the Federal Judicial Center from 1970 to 1976, and a United States Bankruptcy Judge for the Southern District of West Virginia from 1973 to 1976.

From 1970 to 1976, he was an adjunct professor of law at his alma mater, WVU College of Law.

=== Federal judicial service ===
In 1971, West Virginia governor Arch A. Moore proposed Copenhaver for the federal district judgeship vacated by John A. Field Jr. However, despite Copenhaver being rated "well qualified" by the American Bar Association and recommended by the Nixon Justice Department, the president did not appoint him. Instead, the White House went with Kenneth Keller Hall, a candidate recommended by Senator Robert Byrd. Copenhaver would not be appointed to the district court until Hall vacated the seat.

Copenhaver was nominated by President Gerald Ford on August 26, 1976 to be a federal judge of the United States District Court for the Southern District of West Virginia, to the seat vacated by Hall, when Hall was elevated to the court of appeals. Copenhaver was confirmed by the United States Senate on September 1, 1976, and received his commission on September 3, 1976. He assumed senior status on November 1, 2018.

== Later life and death ==
Copenhaver turned 100 on September 29, 2025. Until his death, he continued to serve as a presiding judge in the District Court, making him the longest-serving federal trial judge in the country. Copenhaver died in Charleston on May 12, 2026.

Copenhaver and his wife Camille had three children.

== See also ==
- List of United States federal judges by longevity of service

== Sources ==
- Political Graveyard

Legal offices
Preceded by Kenneth Hall	Judge of the United States District Court for the Southern District of West Virginia; 1976–2018	Succeeded by Frank W. Volk
