= Dennis Raymond Knapp =

American judge (1912–1998)

Senior Judge of the United States District Court for the Southern District of West Virginia
- In office February 25, 1983 – December 25, 1998

Chief Judge of the United States District Court for the Southern District of West Virginia
- In office 1973–1982
- Preceded by: Sidney Lee Christie
- Succeeded by: Charles Harold Haden II

Judge of the United States District Court for the Southern District of West Virginia
- In office December 18, 1970 – February 25, 1983
- Appointed by: Richard Nixon
- Preceded by: Seat established by 84 Stat. 294
- Succeeded by: Elizabeth Virginia Hallanan

Personal details
- Born: Dennis Raymond Knapp; May 13, 1912 Bee, West Virginia
- Died: December 25, 1998 (aged 86) South Charleston, West Virginia
- Education: West Virginia University Institute of Technology (A.B.); West Virginia University (M.A.); West Virginia University College of Law (LL.B.)

Dennis Raymond Knapp (May 13, 1912 – December 25, 1998) was a United States district judge of the United States District Court for the Southern District of West Virginia.

== Education and career ==
Born in Bee, (Note: Bee was a small community, now defunct, in Putnam County, West Virginia.) West Virginia, Knapp received an Artium Baccalaureus degree from West Virginia University Institute of Technology in 1932, a Master of Arts from West Virginia University in 1934, and a Bachelor of Laws from West Virginia University College of Law in 1940. He was in private practice in Nitro, West Virginia from 1940 to 1942. He was an attorney for the United States War Department from 1942 to 1944. He was in the United States Army as a Sergeant from 1944 to 1946. He was in private practice in Nitro from 1946 to 1956. He was city attorney of Nitro from 1948 to 1956. He was a judge of the Court of Common Pleas for Kanawha County, West Virginia from 1957 to 1970.

== Federal judicial service ==
On December 8, 1970, Knapp was nominated by President Richard Nixon to a new seat on the United States District Court for the Southern District of West Virginia created by 84 Stat. 294. He was confirmed by the United States Senate on December 16, 1970, and received his commission on December 18, 1970. He served as Chief Judge from 1973 to 1982. He assumed senior status on February 25, 1983, and served in that capacity until his death on December 25, 1998, in South Charleston, West Virginia.

== Sources ==
Legal offices
Preceded by Seat established by 84 Stat. 294	Judge of the United States District Court for the Southern District of West Virginia; 1970–1983	Succeeded by Elizabeth Virginia Hallanan
Preceded by Sidney Lee Christie	Chief Judge of the United States District Court for the Southern District of West Virginia; 1973–1982	Succeeded by Charles Harold Haden II
