= Robert Jackson Staker =

American judge

Senior Judge of the United States District Court for the Southern District of West Virginia
- In office December 31, 1994 – September 30, 2005

Judge of the United States District Court for the Southern District of West Virginia
- In office September 13, 1979 – December 31, 1994
- Appointed by: Jimmy Carter
- Preceded by: Seat established by 92 Stat. 1629
- Succeeded by: Joseph Robert Goodwin

Personal details
- Born: Robert Jackson Staker; February 14, 1925 Kermit, West Virginia
- Died: November 30, 2008 (aged 83) South Point, Ohio
- Spouse: Sue Blankenship Poore Staker (dec. 2017)
- Children: J. Timothy Poore (dec. 2008), D. Seth Staker
- Education: West Virginia University College of Law (LLB)

Robert Jackson Staker (February 14, 1925 – November 30, 2008) was a United States district judge of the United States District Court for the Southern District of West Virginia.

== Education and career ==
Staker was born in Kermit, West Virginia. He received a Bachelor of Laws from West Virginia University College of Law in 1952. He was in the United States Navy as a radioman from 1943 to 1946. He was in private practice of law in Williamson, West Virginia from 1952 to 1968. He was an assistant prosecuting attorney of Mingo County, West Virginia in 1960. He was a judge of the Circuit Court of Mingo County from 1969 to 1979.

== Federal judicial service ==
Staker was nominated by President Jimmy Carter on June 14, 1979, to the United States District Court for the Southern District of West Virginia, to a new seat created by 92 Stat. 1629. He was confirmed by the United States Senate on September 11, 1979, and received his commission on September 13, 1979. He assumed senior status on December 31, 1994. His service was terminated on September 30, 2005, due to retirement.

== Death ==
Staker died on November 30, 2008, in South Point, Ohio.

== Sources ==
Legal offices
Preceded by Seat established by 92 Stat. 1629	Judge of the United States District Court for the Southern District of West Virginia; 1979–1994	Succeeded by Joseph Robert Goodwin
