= David A. Faber =

American judge (born 1942)

David Alan Faber

Senior Judge of the United States District Court for the Southern District of West Virginia
- Incumbent
- Assumed office December 31, 2008

Chief Judge of the United States District Court for the Southern District of West Virginia
- In office 2002–2007
- Preceded by: Charles Harold Haden II
- Succeeded by: Joseph R. Goodwin

Judge of the United States District Court for the Southern District of West Virginia
- In office November 21, 1991 – December 31, 2008
- Appointed by: George H. W. Bush
- Preceded by: Seat established by 104 Stat. 5089
- Succeeded by: Irene Berger

Personal details
- Born: David Alan Faber; October 21, 1942 (age 83) Charleston, West Virginia, U.S.
- Education: West Virginia University (AB); Yale University (JD); University of Cambridge (PhD); University of Virginia (LLM)

David Alan Faber (born October 21, 1942) is a senior United States district judge of the United States District Court for the Southern District of West Virginia.

== Education and career ==
Feber was born in Charleston, West Virginia. He graduated from Sissonville High School and received an Artium Baccalaureus degree from West Virginia University in 1964 and a Juris Doctor from Yale Law School in 1967. He was in private practice in Charleston from 1967 to 1968. He was in the United States Air Force, JAG Corps from 1968 to 1972, and was then in the United States Naval Reserve from 1973 to 1977. He returned to private practice in Charleston from 1972 to 1981, and was in the West Virginia Air National Guard from 1978 to 1992. He was the United States Attorney for the Southern District of West Virginia from 1981 to 1986, again returning to private practice in Charleston from 1987 to 1991, also serving as a special part-time assistant United States attorney for the Northern District of West Virginia from 1988 to 1990. Faber earned his Doctor of Philosophy in history from the University of Cambridge. He earned his Master of Laws from the University of Virginia School of Law.

=== Federal judicial service ===
On August 1, 1991, Faber was nominated by President George H. W. Bush to a new seat on the United States District Court for the Southern District of West Virginia created by 104 Stat. 5089. He was confirmed by the United States Senate on November 21, 1991, and received his commission on November 25, 1991. He served as Chief Judge from 2002 to 2007, assuming senior status on December 31, 2008. Faber sits by designation on the United States Court of Appeals for the Fourth Circuit and the United States Court of Appeals for the Ninth Circuit.

== Sources ==
Legal offices
Preceded by Seat established by 104 Stat. 5089	Judge of the United States District Court for the Southern District of West Virginia; 1991–2008	Succeeded by Irene Berger
Preceded by Charles Harold Haden II	Chief Judge of the United States District Court for the Southern District of West Virginia; 2002–2007	Succeeded by Joseph R. Goodwin
