= Benjamin Franklin Keller =

American judge

Judge of the United States District Court for the Southern District of West Virginia
- In office June 18, 1901 – August 8, 1921
- Appointed by: William McKinley (recess); Theodore Roosevelt (commission)
- Preceded by: Seat established by 31 Stat. 736
- Succeeded by: Seat abolished

Personal details
- Born: Benjamin Franklin Keller; April 21, 1857 Boalsburg, Pennsylvania
- Died: August 8, 1921 (aged 64)
- Education: Pennsylvania State University (B.S., M.S.); George Washington University Law School (LL.B.)

Benjamin Franklin Keller (April 21, 1857 – August 8, 1921) was a United States district judge of the United States District Court for the Southern District of West Virginia.

== Education and career ==
Born in Boalsburg, Pennsylvania, Keller received a Bachelor of Science degree from Pennsylvania State College (now Pennsylvania State University) in 1876, a Master of Science degree from the same institution in 1879, and a Bachelor of Laws from Columbian University School of Law (now George Washington University Law School) in 1882. He was in private practice in Bramwell, West Virginia from 1891 to 1901.

== Federal judicial service ==
Keller received a recess appointment from President William McKinley on June 18, 1901, to the United States District Court for the Southern District of West Virginia, to a new seat authorized by 31 Stat. 736. He was nominated to the same position by President Theodore Roosevelt on December 5, 1901. He was confirmed by the United States Senate on December 17, 1901, and received his commission the same day. His service terminated on August 8, 1921, due to his death.

== Sources ==
Legal offices
Preceded by Seat established by 31 Stat. 736	Judge of the United States District Court for the Southern District of West Virginia; 1901–1921	Succeeded by Seat abolished
