= Frank W. Volk =

American judge (born 1965)

Frank Volk
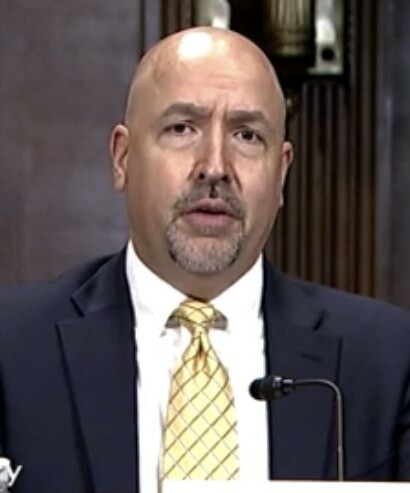

Chief Judge of the United States District Court for the Southern District of West Virginia
- Incumbent
- Assumed office September 5, 2024
- Preceded by: Thomas E. Johnston

Judge of the United States District Court for the Southern District of West Virginia
- Incumbent
- Assumed office October 17, 2019
- Appointed by: Donald Trump
- Preceded by: John Thomas Copenhaver Jr.

Personal details
- Born: Frank William Volk; November 10, 1965 (age 60) Morgantown, West Virginia, U.S.
- Education: West Virginia University (BA, JD)

Frank William Volk (born November 10, 1965) is the chief United States district judge of the United States District Court for the Southern District of West Virginia.

== Education ==
Volk earned his Bachelor of Arts from West Virginia University in 1989 and his Juris Doctor from the West Virginia University College of Law in 1992.

== Legal career ==
Upon graduating law school, Volk served as a law clerk to Judge Charles Harold Haden II of the United States District Court for the Southern District of West Virginia from 1992 to 1993 and as a term law clerk to Judge M. Blane Michael of the United States Court of Appeals for the Fourth Circuit from 1993 to 1994. Prior to his appointment to the bench, he served as a career law clerk on the United States District Court for the Southern District of West Virginia, working for both Judges John Thomas Copenhaver Jr. from 2004 to 2015 and Charles Harold Haden II from 1995 to 2004. During that time, he was an adjunct professor at the West Virginia University College of Law, where he taught courses on federal civil rights law and bankruptcy for more than a decade.

== Federal judicial service ==
=== Bankruptcy court service ===
Volk served as chief judge of the United States Bankruptcy Court for the Southern District of West Virginia from 2015 to 2019.

=== District court service ===
On April 2, 2019, President Donald Trump announced his intent to nominate Volk to serve as a United States district judge of the United States District Court for the Southern District of West Virginia. On April 4, 2019, his nomination was sent to the Senate. President Trump nominated Volk to the seat vacated by Judge John Thomas Copenhaver Jr., who assumed senior status on November 1, 2018. On May 22, 2019, a hearing on his nomination was held before the Senate Judiciary Committee. On June 20, 2019, his nomination was reported out of committee by a voice vote. On October 16, 2019, the United States Senate invoked cloture on his nomination by a 90–0 vote. His nomination was confirmed later that day by a 92–0 vote. He received his judicial commission on October 17, 2019. He became chief judge on September 5, 2024.

Legal offices
| Preceded by John Thomas Copenhaver Jr. | Judge of the United States District Court for the Southern District of West Virginia; 2019–present | Incumbent |
| Preceded by Thomas E. Johnston | Chief Judge of the United States District Court for the Southern District of West Virginia; 2024–present | Incumbent |
