= George Warwick McClintic =

American judge

Senior Judge of the United States District Court for the Southern District of West Virginia
- In office March 1, 1941 – September 25, 1942

Judge of the United States District Court for the Southern District of West Virginia
- In office July 25, 1921 – March 1, 1941
- Appointed by: Warren G. Harding
- Preceded by: Seat established 42 Stat. 67
- Succeeded by: Ben Moore

Personal details
- Born: George Warwick McClintic; January 14, 1866 Pocahontas County, West Virginia
- Died: September 25, 1942 (aged 76)
- Education: Roanoke College (A.B.); University of Virginia School of Law (LL.B.)

George Warwick McClintic (January 14, 1866 – September 25, 1942) was a United States district judge of the United States District Court for the Southern District of West Virginia.

== Education and career ==
Born in Pocahontas County, West Virginia, McClintic received an Artium Baccalaureus degree from Roanoke College in 1883 and a Bachelor of Laws from the University of Virginia School of Law in 1886. He was in private practice in Charleston, West Virginia from 1888 to 1921. He was a member of the West Virginia House of Delegates from 1919 to 1921.

== Federal judicial service ==
On July 19, 1921, McClintic was nominated by President Warren G. Harding to a new seat on the United States District Court for the Southern District of West Virginia created by 42 Stat. 67. He was confirmed by the United States Senate on July 25, 1921, and received his commission the same day. He assumed senior status on March 1, 1941, serving in that capacity until his death on September 25, 1942.

== Sources ==
Legal offices
| Preceded by Seat established by 42 Stat. 67 | Judge of the United States District Court for the Southern District of West Virginia; 1921–1941 | Succeeded by Ben Moore |
