= Paul L. Selby =

American lawyer

Paul L. Selby, Jr.

Dean of WVU College of Law
- In office 1964–1972

Personal details
- Born: January 27, 1924 Columbus, Ohio, U.S.
- Died: October 6, 1999 (aged 75) Morgantown, West Virginia, U.S.
- Education: Ohio State (B.A.); Ohio State (J.D.)
- Occupation: Professor; Lawyer; Administrator

Paul L. Selby, Jr. (January 27, 1924 – October 6, 1999) was the dean and a professor emeritus of law at the West Virginia University College of Law. Selby was also a member of the 1942 National Championship Ohio State Buckeyes football team.

== Early life and education ==
Selby was born in Columbus, Ohio, the son of Paul L. Selby. His father was in corporate law, and vice-president of the National Consumer Finance Association. Selby earned his bachelor's degree cum laude from Ohio State University in 1944. He received his Juris Doctor degree cum laude from Ohio State University's Moritz College of Law in 1947, where he was president of the Student Bar Association, business manager of the Ohio State Law Journal, a member of Phi Delta Phi, and graduated Order of the Coif.

== Career ==
Selby begin his legal career in private practice in Columbus, Ohio, where he specialized in personal injury and medical malpractice defense for ten years. In 1957, Selby became a member of the Ohio State University Moritz College of Law faculty, serving as a professor, assistant dean and director of legal clinics. In 1964, Selby became the Dean of the West Virginia University College of Law. He served as Dean until 1972, when he resigned to concentrate on teaching. He retired in 1989 and was named professor emeritus. The West Virginia University College of Law honored him with the Justicia Officium Award in 1996.

== Personal life ==
Selby was married and had three sons. He survived a fall from a seventh-floor hotel window in 1966. He died in 1999, at age 75, in Morgantown, West Virginia.

Academic offices
| Preceded by | Dean of WVU College of Law; 1964-1972 | Succeeded by |
