= Agnes Westbrook Morrison =

American lawyer

Agnes Jane Westbrook Morrison (1854-1939) was West Virginia’s first female lawyer.

Morrison was born in 1854 in Wheeling, Virginia, to Henry Westbrook and Martha Barratt. By 1895, Morrison would become West Virginia College of Law's first female graduate. Her husband Charles Sumner Morrison was a classmate and he graduated the same year. She became the first female admitted to practice law in West Virginia the following year and subsequently set up a law practice with her husband in Wheeling. Morrison's legacy included being a founder of the women's organization Collegiate Alumnae of Wheeling, which has stayed in existence long after her death.

Morrison died on September 24, 1939, in Taylorstown, Pennsylvania.

== See also ==
- List of first women lawyers and judges in West Virginia
