= Joseph R. Goodwin =

American judge (born 1942)

Joseph Robert Goodwin

Chief Judge of the United States District Court for the Southern District of West Virginia
- In office 2007–2012
- Preceded by: David A. Faber
- Succeeded by: Robert Charles Chambers

Judge of the United States District Court for the Southern District of West Virginia
- Incumbent
- Assumed office May 10, 1995
- Appointed by: Bill Clinton
- Preceded by: Robert Jackson Staker

Personal details
- Born: December 23, 1942 (age 83) Ripley, West Virginia, U.S.
- Children: Booth Goodwin
- Relatives: Carte Goodwin (nephew); Amy Shuler Goodwin (daughter-in-law)
- Education: West Virginia University (BS, JD)

Joseph Robert Goodwin (born December 23, 1942) is a United States district judge of the United States District Court for the Southern District of West Virginia.

== Early life and education ==
Born in Ripley, West Virginia, Goodwin received a Bachelor of Science degree from West Virginia University in 1965 and was in the United States Army Adjutant General Corps during the Vietnam War, from 1965 to 1967. He received a Juris Doctor from West Virginia University College of Law in 1970.

== Career ==
Goodwin was a city attorney for Ripley from 1971 to 1972, and was then a municipal judge for the city until 1973. He then entered private practice in Charleston, West Virginia, until 1995.

=== Federal judicial service ===
On February 28, 1995, Goodwin was nominated by President Bill Clinton to a seat on the United States District Court for the Southern District of West Virginia vacated by the retirement of Robert Jackson Staker. Goodwin was confirmed by the United States Senate on May 8, 1995, and received his commission on May 10, 1995. He served as chief judge of the district from 2007 to 2012.

In June 2017, Goodwin rejected prosecutors' proposed plea bargain because he found holding an open jury trial of an accused fentanyl dealer would be in the public interest.

On October 12, 2022, he ruled the ban on guns without serial numbers to be unconstitutional.

== Personal life ==
Goodwin's son, Booth Goodwin, was appointed in 2010 by President Barack Obama to serve as United States Attorney for the Southern District of West Virginia. His daughter-in-law, Amy Shuler Goodwin, is the mayor of Charleston, West Virginia and, prior to her election, served as a spokesperson for West Virginia governors Bob Wise and Earl Ray Tomblin. Goodwin's nephew is former U.S. Senator from West Virginia Carte Goodwin.

Legal offices
Preceded by Robert Jackson Staker	Judge of the United States District Court for the Southern District of West Virginia; 1995–present	Incumbent
Preceded by David A. Faber	Chief Judge of the United States District Court for the Southern District of West Virginia; 2007–2012	Succeeded by Robert Charles Chambers
