= Faraday, West Virginia =

Unincorporated community in West Virginia, United States

Faraday
- Unincorporated community
- Location within the state of West Virginia Faraday (the United States)
- Coordinates: 37°12′23″N 81°38′14″W
- Country: United States
- State: West Virginia
- County: McDowell
- Time zone: UTC-5 (Eastern (EST))
  - Summer (DST): UTC-4 (EDT)
- GNIS feature ID: 1554444

Faraday is an unincorporated community in McDowell County, West Virginia, United States. It lies just north of the border with Tazewell County, Virginia on County Route 9.
