= Emory International Law Review =

- Discipline: International law
- Language: English

Standard abbreviations
- Bluebook: Emory Int'l L. Rev
- ISO 4: Find out here

Indexing
- ISSN: 1052-2840

The Emory International Law Review (EILR) is a student-edited and produced law review published by Emory University School of Law. EILR is currently publishing its 41st volume.

EILR's articles explore topics across international and comparative law, from human rights to international arbitration to international intellectual property law and beyond. Past articles have focused on women's health, patent and trade agreements in the global fight against HIV/AIDS, appropriate venues for prosecuting detainees in the war on terror, international legal responses to natural disasters, and freedom of religion in Russia. By publishing authors such as Jimmy Carter, Mikhail Gorbachev, Desmond Tutu, Boutros Boutros-Ghali, and Shirin Ebadi, EILR has become a destination for high-profile discussion of pressing international law topics.

The annual EILR Symposium presents perspectives on a contemporary international legal issue. The 2021 Symposium focused on international police procedures and their effects on human rights. The 2022 Symposium explored international data privacy, highlighting the balance between security interests and protection of individual privacy rights.

EILR is edited entirely by students. EILR is ranked in the top 25 student-edited law reviews for international law and comparative law. Its article acceptance rate over Volumes 35 and 36 is 13% of 435 total article submissions. Students obtain admission to EILR through a "write-on" process at the end of each academic year, which is conducted jointly by EILR, the Emory Law Journal, the Emory Corporate Governance and Accountability Review, the Journal of Law and Religion, and the Emory Bankruptcy Developments Journal. Of the nearly two-hundred students that participate in the intra-journal write-on each year, approximately thirty are invited to join EILR as candidates. After accepting an offer to join EILR, candidates constitute the law review staff. Staff members are responsible for fact-checking and editing all articles selected by the law review for publication. Additionally, staff members must write a student comment on a novel area of international or comparative law. Each year, the top comments are awarded by being published in the subsequent volume of the law review. Upon successful completion of the staff member year, students are elevated to EILR's editorial board. Thirteen of these students constitute the executive board, which is elected each February. The editor-in-chief oversees the executive board, all editors and staff, and all other aspects of the law review.

The Emory International Law Review began its publishing life under the title Emory Journal of International Dispute Resolution for its first three volumes (1986–89).
