= Ben Moore (judge) =

American judge (1891–1958)

Chief Judge of the United States District Court for the Southern District of West Virginia
- In office 1948–1958
- Preceded by: Office established
- Succeeded by: John A. Field Jr.

Judge of the United States District Court for the Southern District of West Virginia
- In office March 27, 1941 – September 25, 1958
- Appointed by: Franklin D. Roosevelt
- Preceded by: George Warwick McClintic
- Succeeded by: John A. Field Jr.

Personal details
- Born: Ben Moore; January 1, 1891 Salyersville, Kentucky
- Died: September 25, 1958 (aged 67)
- Education: read law

Ben Moore (January 1, 1891 – September 25, 1958) was a United States district judge of the United States District Court for the Southern District of West Virginia.

== Education and career ==
Born in Salyersville, Kentucky, Moore read law in 1915, and was in private practice in Charleston, West Virginia from 1915 to 1940. He was a Commissioner in Chancery for the Circuit Court of Kanawha County, West Virginia from 1918 to 1940, and a Judge of the Court of Common Pleas of Kanawha County in 1941.

== Federal judicial service ==
Moore was nominated by President Franklin D. Roosevelt on March 1, 1941, to a seat on the United States District Court for the Southern District of West Virginia vacated by Judge George Warwick McClintic. He was confirmed by the United States Senate on March 20, 1941, and received his commission on March 27, 1941. He served as Chief Judge from 1948 to 1958. His service terminated on September 25, 1958, due to his death.

== Sources ==
Legal offices
Preceded by George Warwick McClintic	Judge of the United States District Court for the Southern District of West Virginia; 1941–1958	Succeeded by John A. Field Jr.
Preceded by Office established	Chief Judge of the United States District Court for the Southern District of West Virginia; 1948–1958	Succeeded by John A. Field Jr.
