= Thomas E. Johnston =

American judge (born 1967)

Chief Judge of the United States District Court for the Southern District of West Virginia
- In office September 5, 2017 – September 5, 2024
- Preceded by: Robert Charles Chambers
- Succeeded by: Frank W. Volk

Judge of the United States District Court for the Southern District of West Virginia
- Incumbent
- Assumed office April 17, 2006
- Appointed by: George W. Bush
- Preceded by: Charles Harold Haden II

United States Attorney for the Southern District of West Virginia
- In office 2001–2006
- President: George W. Bush
- Preceded by: Melvin W. Kahle
- Succeeded by: Sharon Lynn Potter

Personal details
- Born: Thomas Edward Johnston; September 8, 1967 (age 58) Charleston, West Virginia, U.S.
- Education: West Virginia University (BA, JD)

Thomas Edward Johnston (born September 8, 1967) is an American lawyer who serves as a United States district judge of the United States District Court for the Southern District of West Virginia.

== Education and career ==
Johnston was born in Charleston, West Virginia. He received a Bachelor of Arts degree from West Virginia University in 1989 and a Juris Doctor from West Virginia University College of Law in 1992. He was a law clerk for Judge Frederick Pfarr Stamp Jr. of the United States District Court for the Northern District of West Virginia from 1992 to 1994. He was in private practice in Wheeling, West Virginia, from 1994 to 2001. He was the United States attorney for the Northern District of West Virginia from 2001 to 2006.

=== Federal judicial service ===
Johnston was nominated by President George W. Bush on September 28, 2005, to serve as a United States district judge of the United States District Court for the Southern District of West Virginia. He was nominated to a seat vacated by Charles Harold Haden II. He was confirmed by the United States Senate on March 6, 2006, and received his commission on April 17, 2006. He became chief judge on September 5, 2017 and served a seven-year-term until September 5, 2024.

== Sources ==
Legal offices
Preceded by Charles Harold Haden II	Judge of the United States District Court for the Southern District of West Virginia; 2006–present	Incumbent
Preceded by Robert Charles Chambers	Chief Judge of the United States District Court for the Southern District of West Virginia; 2017–2024	Succeeded by Frank W. Volk
