= Stephanie Thacker =

American judge (born 1965)

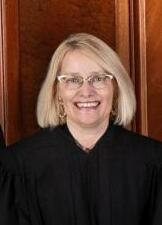
- Thacker in 2022

Judge of the United States Court of Appeals for the Fourth Circuit
- Incumbent
- Assumed office April 17, 2012
- Appointed by: Barack Obama
- Preceded by: M. Blane Michael

Personal details
- Born: Stephanie Dawn Young; 1965 (age 60–61) Huntington, West Virginia, U.S.
- Education: Marshall University (BA); West Virginia University (JD)

Stephanie Dawn Thacker (née Young; born 1965) is a United States circuit judge of the United States Court of Appeals for the Fourth Circuit.

== Early life and education ==
Born Stephanie Dawn Young in Huntington, West Virginia, she was raised in Hamlin, West Virginia. Thacker earned a Bachelor of Arts degree in marketing, magna cum laude, from Marshall University in 1987 and her Juris Doctor, with honors, from West Virginia University in 1990.

== Professional career ==
After graduating from law school, Thacker spent two years working in the Pittsburgh office of the law firm Kirkpatrick & Lockhart (now K&L Gates). She then worked briefly for the West Virginia Office of the Attorney General before joining the law firm King, Betts & Allen. In 1994, Thacker took a job in the United States Attorney's office for the Southern District of West Virginia, serving as an Assistant United States Attorney in the Criminal Division and handling a wide range of criminal prosecutions.

In 1999, Thacker moved to Washington, D.C. to work as a trial attorney in the United States Department of Justice's Child Exploitation and Obscenity Section. She worked there for seven years, serving as Deputy Chief of Litigation for two years and then as Principal Deputy Chief of Litigation for five years. She also was part of the team that prosecuted the first case the United States ever brought involving the Violence Against Women Act. In 2006, Thacker joined the Charleston, West Virginia, law firm Guthrie & Thomas as a partner. While at Guthrie & Thomas, Thacker's practice included criminal defense work, including representation of Jeffrey Epstein on matters related to alleged child sex trafficking.

== Federal judicial service ==
In July 2011, the West Virginia Record reported that President Obama would select Thacker to the judicial vacancy on the United States Court of Appeals for the Fourth Circuit that was created by the death of Judge M. Blane Michael. On September 8, 2011, Obama formally nominated her. The Judiciary Committee reported her nomination out of the committee on November 3, 2011 by a voice vote. The United States Senate confirmed her nomination on April 16, 2012 by a 91–3 vote. She received her commission on April 17, 2012.

In October 2017, Thacker wrote for the panel majority when it found that the Bladensburg Peace Cross memorial from World War I now violated the Constitution's Establishment Clause and ordering either its arms removed or the entire monument razed. Her judgement was ultimately reversed by the U.S. Supreme Court in American Legion v. American Humanist Association (2019).

In April 2018, Thacker wrote for the majority when it found that a Maryland law prohibiting price gouging in prescription drug prices violated the constitution's Dormant Commerce Clause.

On April 7, 2025, Thacker was one of three judges to order the government to return Kilmar Abrego Garcia, who was erroneously deported to El Salvador, back to the United States. Thacker wrote "The United States Government has no legal authority to snatch a person who is lawfully present in the United States off the street and remove him from the country without due process. The Government’s contention otherwise, and its argument that the federal courts are powerless to intervene, are unconscionable."

Furthermore, she expressed concern about the precedent this could set if the Government wins: "The Government may not rely on its own failure to circumvent its own ruling that Abrego Garcia could not be removed to El Salvador. More importantly, the Government cannot be permitted to ignore the Fifth Amendment, deny due process of law, and remove anyone it wants, simply because it claims the victims of its lawlessness are members of a gang. Nor can the Government be permitted to disclaim any ability to return those it has wrongfully removed by citing their physical presence in a foreign jurisdiction. This is a slippery -- and dangerous -- constitutional slope. If due process is of no moment, what is stopping the Government from removing and refusing to return a lawful permanent resident or even a natural born citizen?"

== See also ==
- List of first women lawyers and judges in West Virginia

Legal offices
Preceded by M. Blane Michael	Judge of the United States Court of Appeals for the Fourth Circuit; 2012–present	Incumbent
