= Charles Harold Haden II =

American judge

Chief Judge of the United States District Court for the Southern District of West Virginia
- In office 1982–2002
- Preceded by: Dennis Raymond Knapp
- Succeeded by: David A. Faber

Judge of the United States District Court for the Northern District of West Virginia
- In office November 21, 1975 – January 14, 1983
- Appointed by: Gerald Ford
- Preceded by: Sidney Lee Christie
- Succeeded by: Seat abolished

Judge of the United States District Court for the Southern District of West Virginia
- In office November 21, 1975 – March 20, 2004
- Appointed by: Gerald Ford
- Preceded by: Sidney Lee Christie
- Succeeded by: Thomas E. Johnston

Personal details
- Born: Charles Harold Haden II; April 16, 1937 Morgantown, West Virginia
- Died: March 20, 2004 (aged 66) Charleston, West Virginia
- Education: West Virginia University (B.S.); West Virginia University College of Law (LL.B.)

Charles Harold Haden II (April 16, 1937 – March 20, 2004) was a United States district judge of the United States District Court for the Northern District of West Virginia and the United States District Court for the Southern District of West Virginia.

== Education and career ==
Born in Morgantown, West Virginia, Haden received a Bachelor of Science degree from West Virginia University in 1958, where he was a member of Beta Theta Pi fraternity. He went on to receive a Bachelor of Laws from West Virginia University College of Law in 1961. He was in private practice in Morgantown from 1961 to 1969, also serving as a member of the West Virginia House of Delegates from 1963 to 1964, as a board member on the Monongalia County Board of Education from 1967 to 1968, and as a faculty member at the West Virginia University College of Law from 1967 to 1968. He was the West Virginia State Tax Commissioner from 1969 to 1972, and a justice of the Supreme Court of Appeals of West Virginia from 1972 to 1975, serving as chief justice from 1974 to 1975.

== Federal judicial service ==
Haden was nominated by President Gerald Ford on October 1, 1975, to a joint seat on the United States District Court for the Northern District of West Virginia and the United States District Court for the Southern District of West Virginia vacated by Judge Sidney Lee Christie. He was confirmed by the United States Senate on November 20, 1975, and received his commission on November 21, 1975. He served as Chief Judge of the Southern District from 1982 to 2002. His service in the Northern District was terminated on January 14, 1983, due to reassignment. He continued to serve in the Southern District until his death on March 20, 2004, in Charleston.

== Sources ==
Party political offices
| Preceded by Don Carman | Republican nominee for West Virginia Attorney General; 1968 | Succeeded by Joe Laurita, Jr. |
Legal offices
| Preceded by Sidney Lee Christie | Judge of the United States District Court for the Northern District of West Virginia; 1975–1983 | Succeeded by Seat abolished |
| Preceded by Sidney Lee Christie | Judge of the United States District Court for the Southern District of West Virginia; 1975–2004 | Succeeded by Thomas E. Johnston |
| Preceded by Dennis Raymond Knapp | Chief Judge of the United States District Court for the Southern District of West Virginia; 1982–2002 | Succeeded by David A. Faber |
