= United States District Court for the Southern District of West Virginia =

United States federal district court in West Virginia

Coordinates: 38°21′9.1″N 81°38′20.1″W

- (S.D. W. Va.)
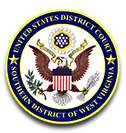
- Location: Charleston More locations: United States Post Office and Court House (Huntington); Beckley; Bluefield; Lewisburg
- Appeals to: Fourth Circuit
- Established: January 22, 1901
- Judges: 5
- Chief Judge: Frank W. Volk

Officers of the court
- U.S. Attorney: Moore Capito
- U.S. Marshal: Michael Baylous
- www.wvsd.uscourts.gov

The United States District Court for the Southern District of West Virginia (in case citations, S.D. W. Va.) is a federal court in the Fourth Circuit (except for patent claims and claims against the U.S. government under the Tucker Act, which are appealed to the Federal Circuit).

The District was established on June 22, 1901.

As of October 20, 2025, the United States attorney for the District is Moore Capito.

== Organization of the court ==
The Southern District spans the counties colored blue on this map.

The United States District Court for the Southern District of West Virginia is one of two federal judicial districts in West Virginia (the other being the Northern District). Court for the Southern District is held at Beckley, Bluefield, Charleston, and Huntington.

Beckley Division comprises the following counties: Greenbrier, Raleigh, Summers, and Wyoming.

Bluefield Division comprises the following counties: Mercer, McDowell, and Monroe.

Charleston Division comprises the following counties: Boone, Clay, Fayette, Jackson, Kanawha, Lincoln, Logan, Mingo, Nicholas, Roane, Wirt, and Wood.

Huntington Division comprises the following counties: Cabell, Mason, Putnam, and Wayne.

== Current judges ==
As of May 13, 2026:

#	Title	Judge	Duty station	Born	Term of service			Appointed by
#	Title	Judge	Duty station	Born	Active	Chief	Senior	Appointed by
19	Chief Judge	Frank W. Volk	Beckley	1965	2019–present	2024–present	—	Trump
15	District Judge	Joseph R. Goodwin	Charleston	1942	1995–present	2007–2012	—	Clinton
16	District Judge	Robert Chambers	Huntington	1952	1997–present	2012–2017	—	Clinton
17	District Judge	Thomas E. Johnston	Charleston	1967	2006–present	2017–2024	—	G.W. Bush
18	District Judge	Irene Berger	Charleston	1954	2009–present	—	—	Obama
14	Senior Judge	David A. Faber	Bluefield	1942	1991–2008	2002–2007	2008–present	G.H.W. Bush

== Former judges ==
#	Judge	Born–died	Active service	Chief Judge	Senior status	Appointed by	Reason for termination
1	Benjamin Franklin Keller	1857–1921	1901–1921	—	—	McKinley	death
2	George Warwick McClintic	1866–1942	1921–1941	—	1941–1942	Harding	death
3	Harry Evans Watkins	1898–1963	1937–1963 (Note: Jointly appointed to the Northern and Southern Districts of West Virginia)	—	—	F. Roosevelt	death
4	Ben Moore	1891–1958	1941–1958	1948–1958	—	F. Roosevelt	death
5	John A. Field Jr.	1910–1995	1959–1971	1959–1971	—	Eisenhower	elevation
6	Sidney Lee Christie	1903–1974	1964–1974	1971–1973	—	L. Johnson	death
7	Dennis Raymond Knapp	1912–1998	1970–1983	1973–1982	1983–1998	Nixon	death
8	Kenneth Keller Hall	1918–1999	1971–1976	—	—	Nixon	elevation
9	Charles Harold Haden II	1937–2004	1975–2004 (Note: From 1975 to 1983, Judge Haden was jointly appointed to the Northern and Southern Districts of West Virginia.)	1982–2002	—	Ford	death
10	John Copenhaver Jr.	1925–2026	1976–2018	—	2018–2026	Ford	death
11	Robert Jackson Staker	1925–2008	1979–1994	—	1994–2005	Carter	retirement
12	William Matthew Kidd	1918–1998	1979–1983	—	—	Carter	reassignment
13	Elizabeth Virginia Hallanan	1925–2004	1983–1996	—	1996–2004	Reagan	death

== Chief judges ==
Chief judges have administrative responsibilities with respect to their district court. Unlike the Supreme Court, where one justice is specifically nominated to be chief, the office of chief judge rotates among the district court judges. To be chief, a judge must have been in active service on the court for at least one year, be under the age of 65, and have not previously served as chief judge.

A vacancy is filled by the judge highest in seniority among the group of qualified judges. The chief judge serves for a term of seven years, or until age 70, whichever occurs first. The age restrictions are waived if no members of the court would otherwise be qualified for the position.

When the office was created in 1948, the chief judge was the longest-serving judge who had not elected to retire, on what has since 1958 been known as senior status, or declined to serve as chief judge. After August 6, 1959, judges could not become or remain chief after turning 70 years old. The current rules have been in operation since October 1, 1982.

== Succession of seats ==
Seat 1
Seat established on January 22, 1901 by 31 Stat. 736
Keller	1901–1921
Seat abolished on August 8, 1921 (temporary judgeship expired)

Seat 2
Seat established on June 25, 1921 by 42 Stat. 67 (temporary)
Seat became permanent upon the abolition of Seat 1 on August 8, 1921
McClintic	1921–1941
Moore	1941–1958
Field, Jr.	1959–1971
Hall	1971–1976
Copenhaver, Jr.	1976–2018
Volk	2019–present

Seat 3
Seat established on June 22, 1936 by 49 Stat. 1805 (temporary, concurrent with Northern District)
Seat made permanent on February 10, 1954 by 68 Stat. 8
Watkins	1937–1963
Christie	1964–1974
Seat assigned solely to Southern District on January 14, 1983 by 96 Stat. 2601
Haden II	1975–2004
Johnston	2006–present

Seat 4
Seat established on June 2, 1970 by 84 Stat. 294
Knapp	1970–1983
Hallanan	1983–1996
Chambers	1997–present

Seat 5
Seat established on October 20, 1978 by 92 Stat. 1629
Staker	1979–1994
Goodwin	1995–present

Seat 6
Seat established on October 20, 1978 by 92 Stat. 1629 (temporary)
Kidd	1979–1983
Seat made permanent and reassigned to Northern District on January 14, 1983, by 96 Stat. 2601

Seat 7
Seat established on December 1, 1990 by 104 Stat. 5089
Faber	1991–2008
Berger	2009–present

== See also ==
- Courts of West Virginia
- List of current United States district judges
- List of United States federal courthouses in West Virginia
- United States District Court for the Northern District of West Virginia
