= West Virginia University College of Law =

Law school in Morgantown, West Virginia, US

Coordinates: 39°38′54.9″N 79°57′30.8″W

- Parent school: West Virginia University
- Established: 1878
- School type: Public
- Dean: Susan Brewer (interim)
- Location: Morgantown, West Virginia, United States
- Enrollment: 294
- Faculty: 33
- USNWR ranking: 117th (tie) (2025)
- Website: www.law.wvu.edu

West Virginia University College of Law is the law school of West Virginia University in Morgantown, West Virginia, United States. The law school was established in 1878 as the university's first professional school. The Juris Doctor program is accredited by the American Bar Association, and the school is listed as an ABA-approved law school and as a member of the Association of American Law Schools. Susan Brewer has served as interim dean since July 2025, succeeding Amelia Smith Rinehart, who served as dean from 2021 to 2025.

== History ==
Instruction in law at West Virginia University began in 1878 in Woodburn Hall, one of the oldest buildings on the Morgantown campus. In 1923, the College of Law moved to a new facility, Colson Hall on University Avenue, and in 1974 it relocated to its current building on the Evansdale campus on land formerly occupied by the Morgantown Country Club.

William R. Thompson received the school's first LL.B. degree in 1879. Agnes Westbrook Morrison became the college's first woman graduate in 1895, and Charles E. Price became its first African American graduate in 1949.

The law school underwent a $26 million expansion and renovation beginning in 2012. The first phase, which added about 30,000 square feet of new space, was completed in 2014, and the project included new classrooms, a courtroom, an event hall and clinic offices.

=== List of deans ===
The following individuals have served as dean of the College of Law:

1. Okey Johnson (1895–1903)
2. St. George Tucker Brooke (1903–1906)
3. Charles E. Hogg (1906–1913)
4. Henry C. Jones (1913–1921)
5. J. Warren Madden (1921–1927)
6. Thurman Arnold (1927–1931)
7. Thomas P. Hardman (1931–1956)
8. Clyde L. Colson (1956–1964)
9. Paul L. Selby (1964–1972)
10. Willard D. Lorensen (1972–1978)
11. E. Gordon Gee (1979–1981)
12. Carl M. Selinger (1982–1989)
13. Donald G. Gifford (1989–1992)
14. Teree E. Foster (1993–1997)
15. John W. Fisher II (1998–2008)
16. Joyce E. McConnell (2008–2014)
17. Gregory W. Bowman (2015–2020)
18. Amelia Smith Rinehart (2021–2025)
19. Susan Brewer (2025–present)

== Admissions ==
According to the law school's 2024 Standard 509 Information Report, West Virginia University College of Law received 496 applications for its fall 2024 entering J.D. class and offered admission to 217 applicants, for an acceptance rate of 43.75 percent. Ninety-seven students enrolled. The median LSAT score for the class was 156, with the 25th and 75th percentile scores at 152 and 158, respectively. The median undergraduate GPA was 3.58, with a 25th-75th percentile range of 3.25 to 3.83.

== Academics ==
West Virginia University College of Law offers a full-time three-year J.D. program and joint-degree options with other West Virginia University graduate programs. The college also offers a Master of Laws (LL.M.) program in energy and sustainable development law. As of fall 2024, the law school reported 294 J.D. students and 33 full-time faculty members, along with 31 additional non-full-time instructional faculty.

=== West Virginia Law Review ===
The College of Law publishes the West Virginia Law Review, a student-edited legal journal founded in 1894. It is often described as the fourth-oldest law review in the United States. The Law Review publishes three issues each year, featuring articles, essays, and student notes on state, national, and international legal topics.

=== Clinics and experiential learning ===
The College of Law operates a clinical law program in which students, under faculty supervision, provide free or low-cost legal services. Established in the 1970s, the program offers clinics in a range of subject areas, including civil litigation, family and child advocacy, immigration and innocence work, veterans’ advocacy, taxation and entrepreneurship, land use and sustainable development, and United States Supreme Court practice.

The law school reports that clinic students collectively provide more than 40,000 hours of pro bono legal services each year through these programs.

=== Bar passage rates ===
Until 1989, graduates of the College of Law were admitted to practice law in West Virginia under a "diploma privilege", which allowed admission to the state bar without sitting for a bar examination. After 1989, graduates have been required to take and pass the bar exam in order to be admitted to practice in West Virginia.

According to a 2024 American Bar Association report, the law school's 2023 graduates had an overall first-time bar passage rate of 69.4 percent, compared with an ABA-weighted average pass rate of 65.6 percent in the jurisdictions where they sat for the exam. The same report lists a two-year ultimate bar passage rate of 88.1 percent for the class of 2021.

== Employment ==
For the class of 2024, 80.4 percent of West Virginia University College of Law graduates obtained full-time, long-term positions requiring bar passage ten months after graduation, and 5.6 percent obtained full-time, long-term positions in which a J.D. degree was an advantage. The largest share of employed graduates worked in private practice, followed by positions in government, judicial clerkships, public interest organizations, business, and education.

== Cost of attendance ==
For the 2024-2025 academic year, the law school reported an estimated first-year cost of attendance of US$27,774 in tuition and fees for West Virginia residents and US$47,070 for non-residents. The law school also estimated US$4,500 for books and supplies and US$12,900 for living expenses.

== Rankings and reputation ==
In the 2025 edition of U.S. News & World Report's "Best Law Schools" rankings, West Virginia University College of Law was tied for 117th among U.S. law schools. U.S. News has also ranked several of the college’s specialty programs, including environmental law, health care law, and tax law, within its subject-area rankings.

Trade publications such as preLaw magazine and The National Jurist have included the law school in periodic "best value" rankings.
