= List of United States federal courthouses in West Virginia =

Following is a list of current and former courthouses of the United States federal court system located in West Virginia. Each entry indicates the name of the building along with an image, if available, its location and the jurisdiction it covers, the dates during which it was used for each such jurisdiction, and, if applicable the person for whom it was named, and the date of renaming. Dates of use will not necessarily correspond with the dates of construction or demolition of a building, as pre-existing structures may be adapted or court use, and former court buildings may later be put to other uses. Also, the official name of the building may be changed at some point after its use as a federal court building has been initiated.

== Courthouses ==
Courthouse	City	Image	Street address	Jurisdiction	Dates of use	Named for
U.S. Courthouse and Federal Building	Beckley		400 Neville Street	S.D.W.Va.	1961–1999; Completed in 1933.	n/a
Robert C. Byrd Federal Building and U.S. Courthouse	Beckley		110 North Heber Street	S.D.W.Va.	1999–present	U.S. Senator Robert Byrd
Elizabeth Kee Federal Building	Bluefield		601 Federal Street	S.D.W.Va.	1911–present	U.S. Rep. Elizabeth Kee (1976)
U.S. Post Office & Court House	Charleston		?	D.W.V. S.D.W.V.	1883–1910; Razed in 1910.	n/a
U.S. Post Office & Court House	Charleston		123 Capitol Street	S.D.W.V.	1911–1965; Now the Kanawha County Public Library.	n/a
U.S. Courthouse and Federal Office Building	Charleston		500 Quarrier Street	S.D.W.V.	1965–1997; Completed in 1961; now privately owned.	n/a
Robert C. Byrd U.S. Courthouse	Charleston		300 Virginia Street East	S.D.W.V.	1997–present	U.S. Senator Robert Byrd
U.S. Courthouse and Post Office	Clarksburg		227 West Pike Street	D.W.V. N.D.W.V.	1888–1932; Later used as the Municipal Building and since demolished.	n/a
U.S. Post Office & Court House	Clarksburg		500 West Pike Street	N.D.W.V.	1932–present	n/a
U.S. Post Office	Elkins		401 Davis Avenue	N.D.W.V.	1918–1970s Now Elkins City Hall.	n/a
Jennings Randolph Federal Center	Elkins		300 3rd Street	N.D.W.V.	?–present	U.S. Sen. Jennings Randolph
Sidney L. Christie Federal Building^{†}	Huntington		845 Fifth Avenue	S.D.W.Va.	1907–present	District Court judge Sidney Lee Christie (1980)
U.S. Courthouse and Post Office†	Martinsburg		300 West King Street	D.W.V. N.D.W.V.	1895–1961; Now The Arts Centre.	n/a
W. Craig Broadwater Federal Building and U.S. Courthouse	Martinsburg		217 West King Street	N.D.W.V.	?–present	District Court judge W. Craig Broadwater (2011)
U.S. Court House & Post Office	Parkersburg		?	D.W.V. N.D.W.V.	1878–1901; 1907–1960s Razed in the 1960s.	n/a
U.S. Courthouse and Federal Building	Parkersburg		425 Juliana Street	S.D.W.Va.	1961–2013	n/a
U.S. Custom House†	Wheeling		1528 Market Street	W.D. Va. D.W.V. N.D.W.V.	1860–1907; Now a museum, renamed West Virginia Independence Hall.	n/a
Federal Building and U.S. Courthouse^{†}	Wheeling		1125 Chapline Street	N.D.W.Va.	1907–present	n/a
U.S. Post Office & Court House	Williamson		2 West 2nd Avenue	S.D.W.Va.	1928–1936; Still in use as a post office.	n/a

== Key ==
^{†}	Listed on the National Register of Historic Places (NRHP)
^{††}	NRHP-listed and also designated as a National Historic Landmark
