= John H. Kamlowsky =

American attorney

United States Attorney for the Northern District of West Virginia
- In office 1964–1969
- President: Lyndon B. Johnson; Richard Nixon
- Preceded by: Robert Earl Maxwell
- Succeeded by: Paul C. Camilletti

Personal details
- Born: August 10, 1925; Kansas City, Missouri
- Died: July 8, 2015 (aged 89); Montgomery, Texas
- Political party: Democratic

John H. Kamlowsky (August 10, 1925 – July 8, 2015) was an American attorney who served as the United States Attorney for the Northern District of West Virginia from 1964 to 1969.

He died on July 8, 2015, in Montgomery, Texas at age 89.
