= Wheeling Historic District =

Historic district in West Virginia, United States

- U.S. National Register of Historic Places
- U.S. Historic district
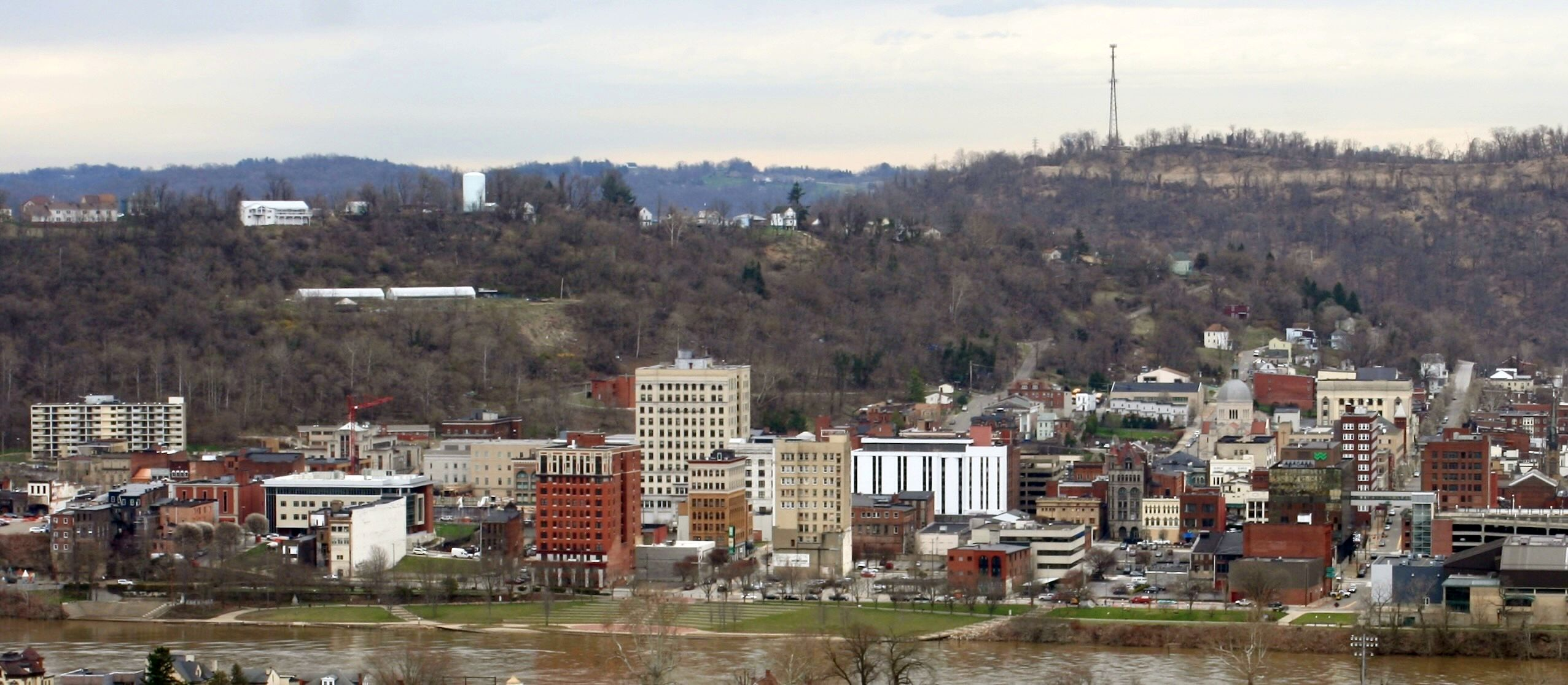

- Location within West Virginia Location within the United States
- Location: Roughly bounded by RR tracks, Eoff, Water, and 10th Sts., Wheeling, West Virginia
- Coordinates: 40°3′36″N 80°43′25″W
- Area: 55.8 acres (22.6 ha)
- Architect: Walter, Thomas U.; Franzheim, Giesey & Faris
- Architectural style: Late 19th And 20th Century Revivals, Greek Revival, Late Victorian
- NRHP reference No.: 79002597
- Added to NRHP: December 31, 1979

Wheeling Historic District, also known as the Wheeling Central Business District, is a national historic district located at Wheeling, Ohio County, West Virginia. The district includes 205 contributing buildings in the central business district of Wheeling. It includes the site of the original location of Fort Henry. The buildings are representative of a number of popular architectural styles from the early-19th century through the present including Greek Revival and Late Victorian. The District was listed on the National Register of Historic Places in 1979.

Contributing buildings in the district include:

- United States Custom House (1859)
- Federal Building and United States Courthouse (1907)
- St. Matthew's Church and Rectory (c. 1892)
- Thomas Paull House (c. 1835)
- English Lutheran Church (1897) designed by Franzheim, Greisey, and Faris
- First United Presbyterian Church (1825)
- City Bank Building (c. 1890) also designed by Franzheim, Greisey, and Faris
- Bank of Wheeling (1892) also designed by Franzheim, Greisey, and Faris,
- Capitol Theatre (1928), designed by Charles W. Bates
- Medical Tower Building (1915)
- Joseph Speidel & Company Building

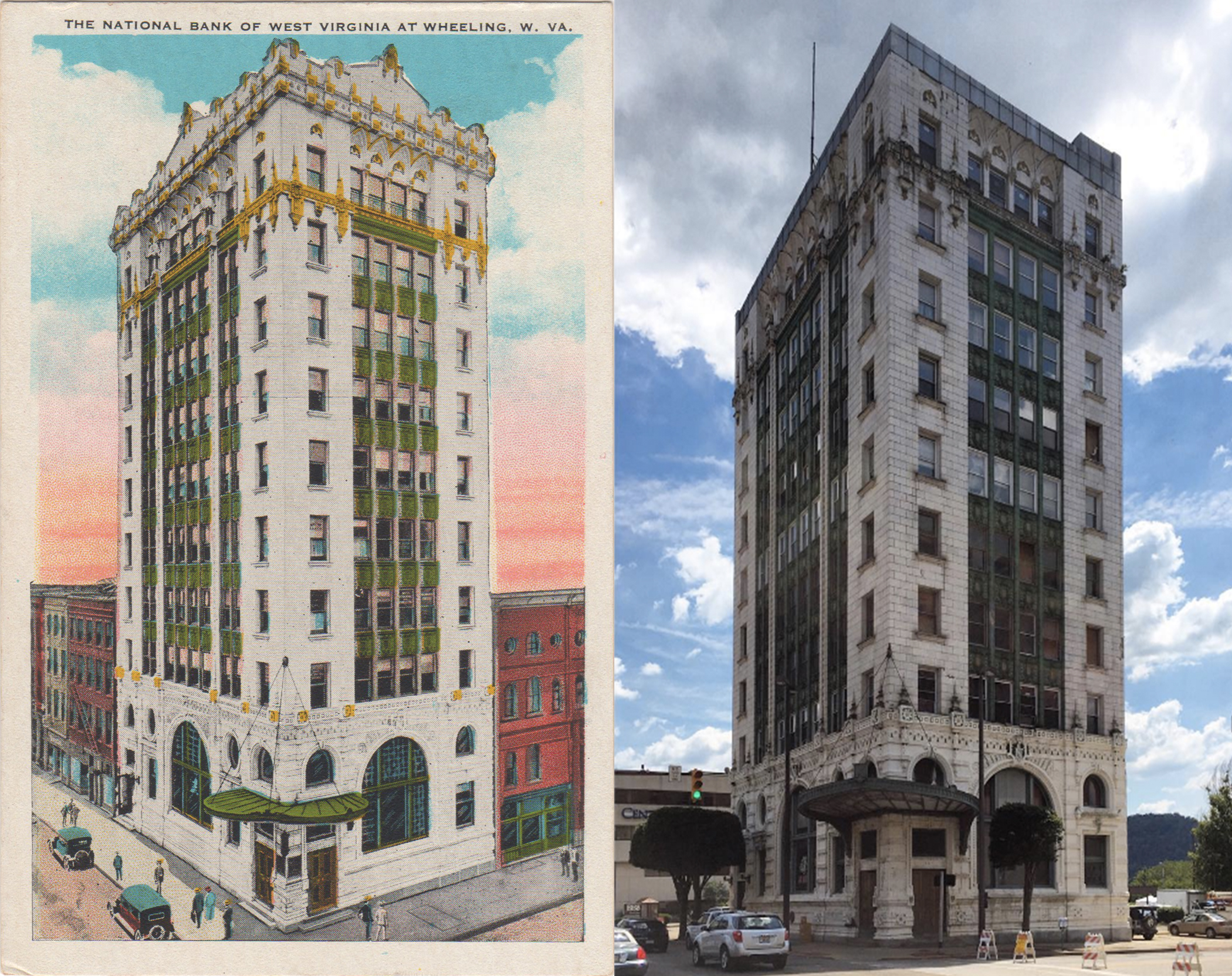
Two views of Charles Bates' National Bank of West Virginia, later home to the W.M. Marsh Drug Company, built 1914-15 in the Wheeling Central Business District. At left is the original structure as depicted in a postcard ca. 1915, and at right is the building in 2016, shorn of its elaborate entablature.

It also includes the West Virginia Independence Hall and Baltimore and Ohio Passenger Terminal (1907-1908), which are listed on the National Register of Historic Places as individual buildings.
