= Governor Pattison =

Governor Pattison may refer to:

- John M. Pattison (1847–1906), 43rd Governor of Ohio
- Robert E. Pattison (1850–1904), 19th Governor of Pennsylvania

== See also ==
- Governor Patterson (disambiguation)
- Okey Patteson (1898–1989), 23rd Governor of West Virginia
