= Governor Patterson =

Governor Patterson or Paterson may refer to:

- David Paterson (born 1954), Governor of New York from 2008 to 2010
- I. L. Patterson (1859–1929), Governor of Oregon from 1927 to 1929
- John Malcolm Patterson (1921–2021), Governor of Alabama from 1959 to 1963
- Malcolm R. Patterson (1861–1935), Governor of Tennessee from 1907 to 1911
- Paul L. Patterson (1900–1956), Governor of Oregon from 1952 to 1956
- Walter Patterson (governor) (died 1798), British colonial Governor of Prince Edward Island from 1769 to 1786
- William Paterson (judge) (1745–1806), 2nd Governor of New Jersey from 1790 to 1793

== See also ==
- Governor Pattison (disambiguation)
- Okey Patteson (1898–1989), 23rd Governor of West Virginia
