= Herbert Stephenson Boreman =

American judge (1897–1982)

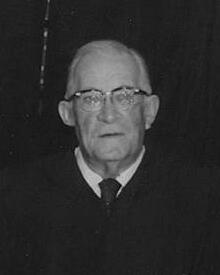
- Boreman in 1973

Senior Judge of the United States Court of Appeals for the Fourth Circuit
- In office June 15, 1971 – March 26, 1982

Judge of the United States Court of Appeals for the Fourth Circuit
- In office June 17, 1959 – June 15, 1971
- Appointed by: Dwight D. Eisenhower
- Preceded by: John J. Parker
- Succeeded by: John A. Field Jr.

Judge of the United States District Court for the Northern District of West Virginia
- In office July 22, 1954 – June 22, 1959
- Appointed by: Dwight D. Eisenhower
- Preceded by: William E. Baker
- Succeeded by: Charles Ferguson Paul

Personal details
- Born: Herbert Stephenson Boreman; September 21, 1897 Middlebourne, West Virginia
- Died: March 26, 1982 (aged 84) Parkersburg, West Virginia
- Party: Republican
- Education: West Virginia University College of Law (LLB)

Herbert Stephenson Boreman (September 21, 1897 – March 26, 1982) was a United States circuit judge of the United States Court of Appeals for the Fourth Circuit and previously was a United States district judge of the United States District Court for the Northern District of West Virginia.

== Education and career ==
Born in Middlebourne, West Virginia, Boreman received a Bachelor of Laws from West Virginia University College of Law in 1920. He was in private practice in Parkersburg, West Virginia, 1920 to 1923, thereafter serving as both an Assistant United States Attorney and as a divorce commissioner for the Wood County Circuit Court of West Virginia from 1923 to 1927, before returning to private practice until 1929. He was Prosecutor for Wood County, West Virginia from 1929 to 1932. From 1932 to 1954, he was again in private practice, also serving as a member of the West Virginia Senate from 1942 to 1950. Boreman ran for Governor of West Virginia in 1948, as a Republican but lost to Democrat Okey L. Patteson, receiving just under 43% of the vote.

== Federal judicial service ==
Boreman was nominated by President Dwight D. Eisenhower on June 22, 1954, to a seat on the United States District Court for the Northern District of West Virginia vacated by Judge William E. Baker. He was confirmed by the United States Senate on July 21, 1954, and received his commission on July 22, 1954. His service terminated on June 22, 1959, due to his elevation to the Fourth Circuit.

Boreman received a recess appointment to the United States Court of Appeals for the Fourth Circuit on October 17, 1958, but declined the appointment. Boreman was nominated by President Eisenhower on January 20, 1959, to a seat on the United States Court of Appeals for the Fourth Circuit vacated by Judge John J. Parker. He was confirmed by the Senate on June 16, 1959, and received his commission on June 17, 1959. He assumed senior status on June 15, 1971. His service terminated on March 26, 1982, due to his death in Parkersburg.

== Sources ==
Party political offices
Preceded by Daniel Boone Dawson	Republican Party nominee for Governor of West Virginia; 1948	Succeeded by Rush Holt Sr.
Legal offices
Preceded by William E. Baker	Judge of the United States District Court for the Northern District of West Virginia; 1954–1959	Succeeded by Charles Ferguson Paul
Preceded by John J. Parker	Judge of the United States Court of Appeals for the Fourth Circuit; 1959–1971	Succeeded by John A. Field Jr.
