= Harry Evans Watkins =

American judge (1898–1963)

Chief Judge of the United States District Court for the Northern District of West Virginia
- In office 1954–1963
- Preceded by: William E. Baker
- Succeeded by: Charles Ferguson Paul

Judge of the United States District Court for the Northern District of West Virginia Judge of the United States District Court for the Southern District of West Virginia
- In office March 3, 1937 – June 6, 1963
- Appointed by: Franklin D. Roosevelt
- Preceded by: Seat established by 49 Stat. 1805
- Succeeded by: Sidney Lee Christie

Personal details
- Born: Harry Evans Watkins; November 6, 1898 Watson, West Virginia
- Died: June 6, 1963 (aged 64)
- Education: West Virginia University College of Law (LL.B.)

Harry Evans Watkins (November 6, 1898 – June 6, 1963) was a United States district judge of the United States District Court for the Northern District of West Virginia and the United States District Court for the Southern District of West Virginia.

== Education and career ==
Born in Watson, West Virginia, Watkins was a United States Army Private First Class in the Signal Corps from 1918 to 1919. He received a Bachelor of Laws from West Virginia University College of Law in 1923. He was in private practice in Fairmont, West Virginia from 1923 to 1937.

== Federal judicial service ==
Watkins was nominated by President Franklin D. Roosevelt on February 17, 1937, to the United States District Court for the Northern District of West Virginia and the United States District Court for the Southern District of West Virginia, to a new joint seat created by 49 Stat. 1805. He was confirmed by the United States Senate on March 2, 1937, and received his commission on March 3, 1937. He served as Chief Judge of the Northern District from 1954 to 1963. Watkins served in that capacity until his death on June 6, 1963.

== Sources ==
Legal offices
Preceded by Seat established by 49 Stat. 1805	Judge of the United States District Court for the Northern District of West Virginia; Judge of the United States District Court for the Southern District of West Virginia; 1937–1963	Succeeded by Sidney Lee Christie
Preceded by William E. Baker	Chief Judge of the United States District Court for the Northern District of West Virginia; 1954–1963	Succeeded by Charles Ferguson Paul
