= Oglebay Institute =

U.S. nonprofit organization

- Founded: July 29, 1930; 96 years ago
- Founder: Earl W. Oglebay
- Tax ID no.: 55-0359760
- Legal status: 501(c)(3) nonprofit organization
- Headquarters: Wheeling, West Virginia, United States
- President: Danielle McCracken
- Revenue: $2,205,425 (2015)
- Expenses: $2,529,260 (2015)
- Endowment: $10,784,110
- Employees: 136 (2014)
- Volunteers: 1,908 (2014)
- Website: oionline.com

Oglebay Institute is a 501(c)(3) non-profit organization incorporated on July 29, 1930, and located in Wheeling, West Virginia, United States of America.

== History ==
The organization's founder, Earl W. Oglebay, willed his country estate to the City of Wheeling for use "as a public park for the enjoyment, recreation and education of the greatest number of people." Part of Oglebay's vision allowed for an organization that would offer cultural and educational activities. Thus, Oglebay Institute was formed to be governed by an elected Board of Trustees.

Under the terms of the bequest by the late Colonel E. W. Oglebay in 1926, the area now known as Oglebay Park was given to the City of Wheeling for "so long as the people shall operate it for purposes of public recreation and education." Shortly after acceptance of the bequest by the City of Wheeling two years later, Oglebay Institute was incorporated (1930) with the following stated objectives and purposes:

To provide and conduct educational and recreational activities at Oglebay Park, Wheeling, West Virginia, and elsewhere.

To cooperate with, assist and supplement the activities of the Park Commission of the City of Wheeling, the Activities Committee of Oglebay Park, the Extension Division of West Virginia University, and such other organizations as may undertake to establish and conduct educational or recreational courses or activities within the sphere of activity of this corporation ...

And in general to do all things necessary or convenient in carrying out the foregoing purposes ...

Five departments offer programs in dance, environmental education, performing arts, regional history, interpretation and presentation and visual and creative arts.

The six facilities which encompass OI include: the Glass Museum, the Mansion Museum, the Stifel Fine Arts Center, the School of Dance, Towngate Theatre & Cinema and the Schrader Environmental Education Center.

== Museums of Oglebay Institute ==
Purchased by Colonel Earl W. Oglebay in 1900 as his summer retreat, the Mansion Museum features period antiques and depicts Wheeling's history from Pioneer times through the Victorian era. The Glass Museum features 3,000 examples of Wheeling glass and china made from 1820 to 1939, including the famous Sweeney Punch Bowl, the largest piece of cut lead glass in the world. Other highlights include the Sinclair Pharmacy and Wymer General Store exhibits and glassmaking demonstrations. The museums are located in Oglebay Park, Wheeling. The mansion was placed on the National Register of Historic Places in 1979.

== Oglebay Institute's Stifel Fine Arts Center ==
The Stifel Center brings experiences in visual and performing arts to the public. Programs include changing art exhibitions in the Hart Galleries, jazz concerts, wine tasting events and cabarets. A hands-on teaching facility, the Stifel Center hosts dozens of classes for children and adults. Oglebay Institute Administrative Offices also are housed at the Stifel. The Stifel is located at 1330 National Road, Wheeling.

It is housed at Edemar, listed on the National Register of Historic Places in 1992.

== Schrader Environmental Education Center ==
Attractions include the A.B. Brooks Discovery Trail System, Children's Awareness Area, EarthTrek Exhibit Hall and the Corson Wildflower and Butterfly Gardens. This hands-on facility offers seasonal events and is one of the region's examples of "Green Architecture." The Schrader also operates the Terra Alta Mountain Camp in Terra Alta, West Virginia. The center is located at Oglebay Park in Wheeling.

== Oglebay Institute's School of Dance ==
Classes include ballet, tap, jazz, hip-hop, Irish step, belly dance, ballroom traditions, fitness and more. Performance troupes and dance concerts bring fine entertainment to area residents and give dancers an opportunity to perform in public.

== Towngate Theatre & Cinema ==
The theater is located at 2118 Market Street, Wheeling, West Virginia, USA.
