= Irene Patricia Murphy Keeley =

American judge (born 1944)

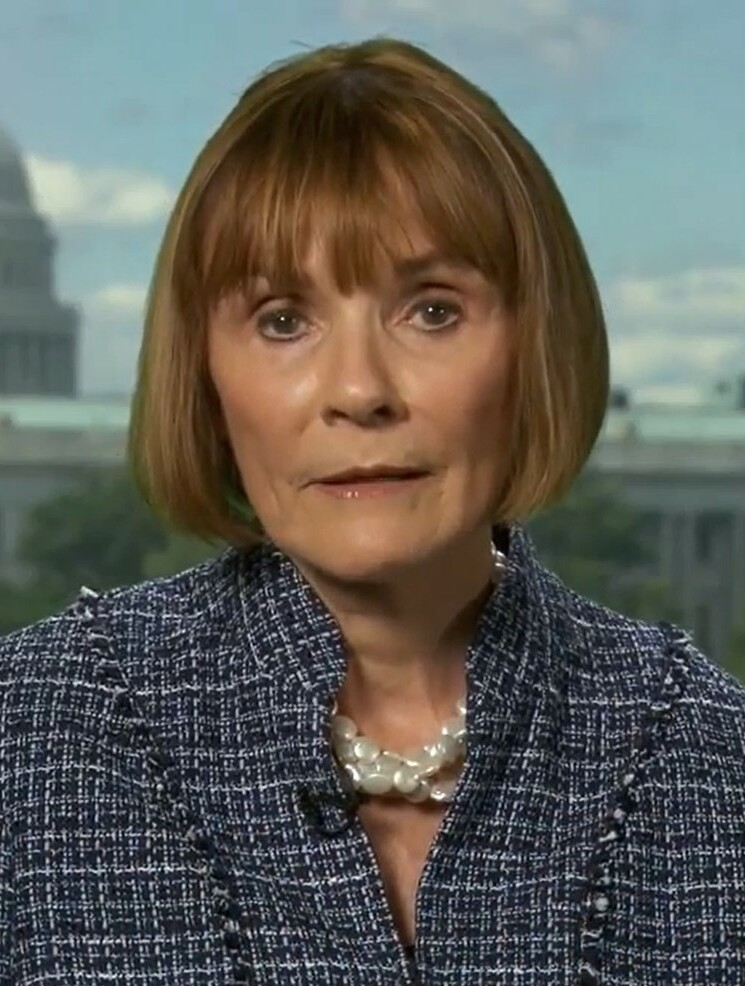
- Keeley in 2014

Senior Judge of the United States District Court for the Northern District of West Virginia
- Incumbent
- Assumed office August 12, 2017

Chief Judge of the United States District Court for the Northern District of West Virginia
- In office 2001–2008
- Preceded by: Frederick Pfarr Stamp Jr.
- Succeeded by: John P. Bailey

Judge of the United States District Court for the Northern District of West Virginia
- In office August 12, 1992 – August 12, 2017
- Appointed by: George H. W. Bush
- Preceded by: Seat established by 104 Stat. 5089
- Succeeded by: Tom Kleeh

Personal details
- Born: January 17, 1944 (age 82) Brooklyn, New York, U.S.
- Education: College of Notre Dame of Maryland (BA); West Virginia University (MA, JD)

Irene Patricia Murphy Keeley (born January 17, 1944) is an inactive senior United States district judge of the United States District Court for the Northern District of West Virginia.

== Education and career ==
Keely was born in Brooklyn. She received a Bachelor of Arts degree from College of Notre Dame of Maryland in 1965, a Master of Arts from West Virginia University in 1977, and a Juris Doctor from West Virginia University College of Law in 1980. She was in private practice in Clarksburg, West Virginia from 1980 to 1992, and was an adjunct professor of law at the West Virginia University College of Law from 1990 to 1991.

=== Federal judicial service ===
On April 1, 1992, Keeley was nominated by President George H. W. Bush to a new seat on the United States District Court for the Northern District of West Virginia created by 104 Stat. 5089. She was confirmed by the United States Senate on August 11, 1992, and received her commission on August 12, 1992. She served as Chief Judge from 2001 to 2008. She assumed senior status on August 12, 2017, and inactive senior status on September 30, 2022.

== Sources ==
Legal offices
Preceded by Seat established by 104 Stat. 5089	Judge of the United States District Court for the Northern District of West Virginia; 1992–2017	Succeeded by Thomas S. Kleeh
Preceded by Frederick Pfarr Stamp Jr.	Chief Judge of the United States District Court for the Northern District of West Virginia; 2001–2008	Succeeded by John P. Bailey
