= 1948 West Virginia gubernatorial election =

- November 2, 1948
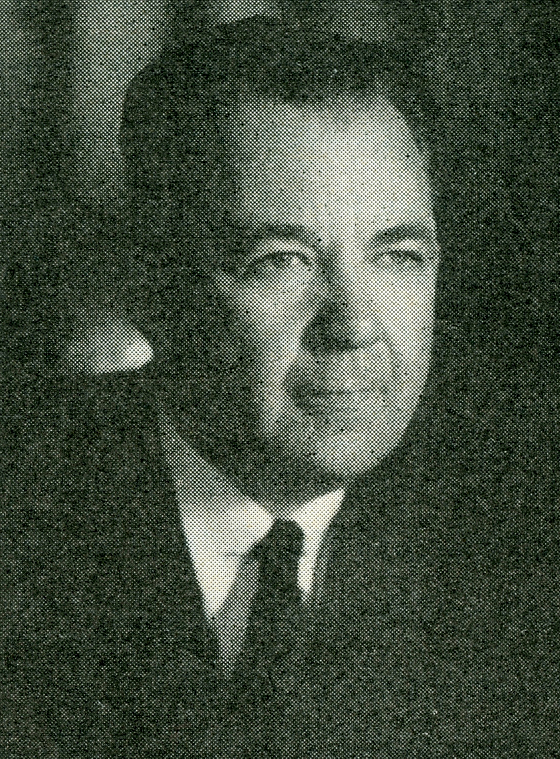

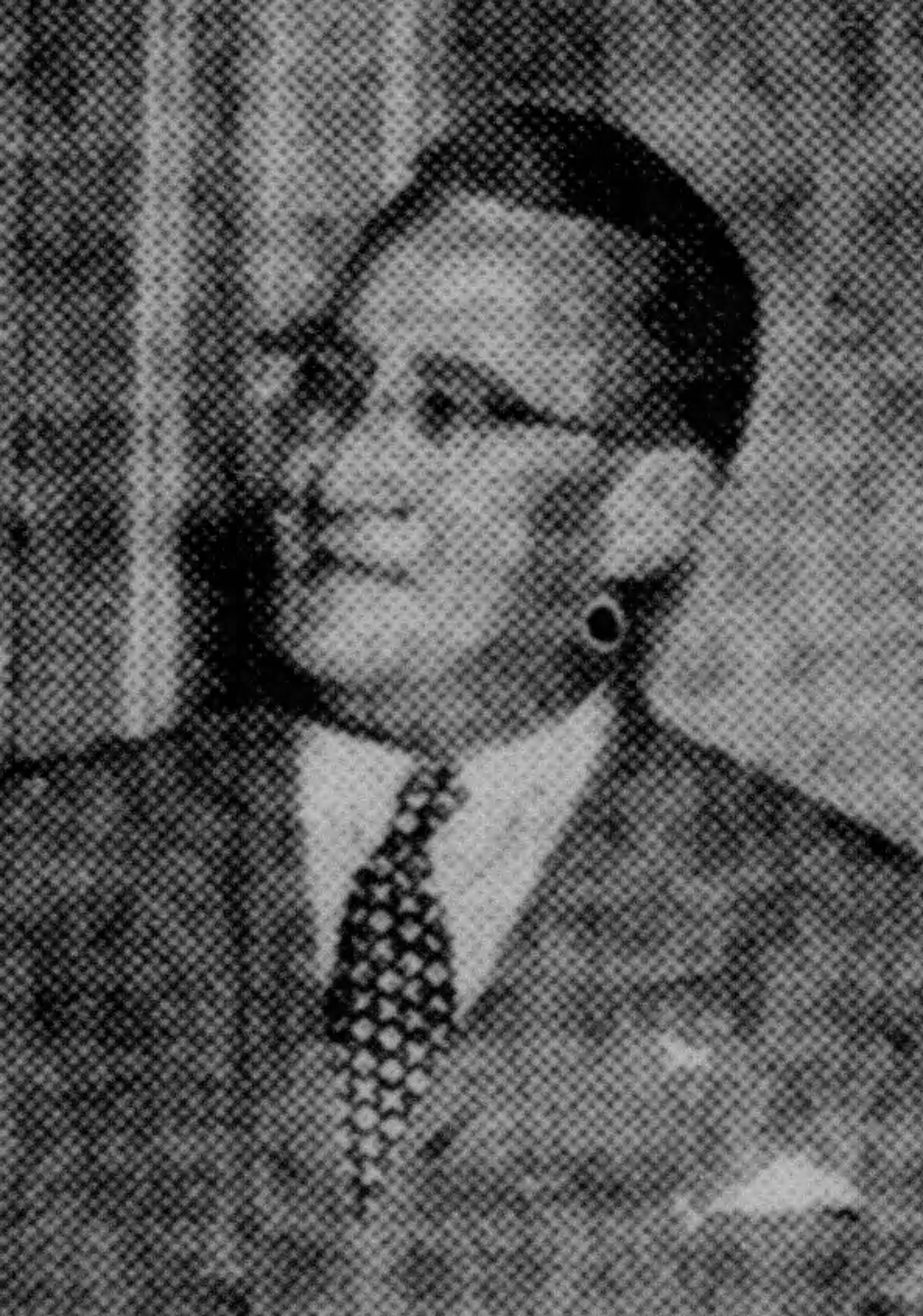
Nominee	Okey Patteson	Herbert Stephenson Boreman
Party	Democratic	Republican
Popular vote	438,752	329,309
Percentage	57.12%	42.88%
- County results Patterson: 50–60% 60–70% 70–80% Boreman: 50–60% 60–70% 70–80%
Governor before election
Clarence W. Meadows
Democratic
Elected Governor
Okey Patteson
Democratic

The 1948 West Virginia gubernatorial election took place on November 2, 1948, to elect the governor of West Virginia. James Kay Thomas unsuccessfully ran for the Democratic nomination.

== Results ==
West Virginia gubernatorial election, 1948
Party	Candidate	Votes	%
Democratic	Okey Patteson	438,752	57.12
Republican	Herbert Stephenson Boreman	329,309	42.88
Total votes		768,061	100
Democratic hold			
