= Charles Ferguson Paul =

American judge

Chief Judge of the United States District Court for the Northern District of West Virginia
- In office 1963–1965
- Preceded by: Harry Evans Watkins
- Succeeded by: Robert Earl Maxwell

Judge of the United States District Court for the Northern District of West Virginia
- In office March 5, 1960 – February 17, 1965
- Appointed by: Dwight D. Eisenhower
- Preceded by: Herbert Stephenson Boreman
- Succeeded by: Robert Earl Maxwell

Personal details
- Born: Charles Ferguson Paul; April 26, 1902 Wheeling, West Virginia
- Died: February 17, 1965 (aged 62)
- Education: West Virginia University (A.B.); Harvard Law School (LL.B.)

Charles Ferguson Paul (April 26, 1902 – February 17, 1965) was a United States district judge of the United States District Court for the Northern District of West Virginia.

== Education and career ==
Born in Wheeling, West Virginia, Paul received an Artium Baccalaureus degree from West Virginia University in 1923 and a Bachelor of Laws from Harvard Law School in 1926. He was in private practice in Wheeling from 1926 to 1960.

== Federal judicial service ==
On January 11, 1960, Paul was nominated by President Dwight D. Eisenhower to a seat on the United States District Court for the Northern District of West Virginia vacated by Judge Herbert Stephenson Boreman. Paul was confirmed by the United States Senate on March 1, 1960, and received his commission on March 5, 1960. He served as Chief Judge from 1963 until his death on February 17, 1965.

== Sources ==
Legal offices
Preceded by Herbert Stephenson Boreman	Judge of the United States District Court for the Northern District of West Virginia; 1960–1965	Succeeded by Robert Earl Maxwell
Preceded by Harry Evans Watkins	Chief Judge of the United States District Court for the Northern District of West Virginia; 1963–1965	Succeeded by Robert Earl Maxwell
