= Tom Kleeh =

American judge (born 1974)

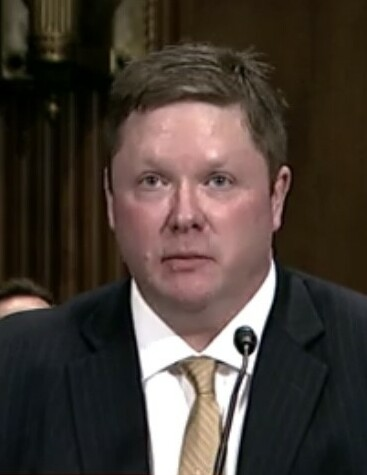

Chief Judge of the United States District Court for the Northern District of West Virginia
- Incumbent
- Assumed office March 19, 2022
- Preceded by: Gina M. Groh

Judge of the United States District Court for the Northern District of West Virginia
- Incumbent
- Assumed office November 5, 2018
- Appointed by: Donald Trump
- Preceded by: Irene Patricia Murphy Keeley

Personal details
- Born: September 14, 1974 (age 51) Wheeling, West Virginia, U.S.
- Education: West Virginia University (BBA, JD)

Thomas Shawn Kleeh (born September 14, 1974) is the chief United States district judge of the United States District Court for the Northern District of West Virginia.

== Biography ==
Kleeh was born and raised in Wheeling, West Virginia and graduated from Wheeling Central High School. He earned his Bachelor of Business Administration from West Virginia University and his Juris Doctor from the West Virginia University College of Law, where he was inducted into the Order of the Coif.

From 1999 to 2018, he practiced with Steptoe & Johnson PLLC, and specialized in labor and employment issues covering both the public and private sectors. He rose to become a member of the firm before becoming a judge. He also served as counsel to the West Virginia Senate's Committee on the Judiciary.

== Federal judicial service ==
In the summer of 2017, Kleeh met with Senators Shelley Moore Capito and Joe Manchin and received their recommendation to the Trump administration for a federal judgeship. On February 12, 2018, President Donald Trump announced his intent to nominate Kleeh to an undetermined seat on the United States District Court for the Northern District of West Virginia. On February 15, 2018, his nomination was sent to the Senate. President Trump nominated Kleeh to the seat vacated by Judge Irene Patricia Murphy Keeley, who assumed senior status on August 12, 2017. On April 25, 2018, a hearing on his nomination was held before the Senate Judiciary Committee. On May 24, 2018, his nomination was reported out of committee by a 14–7 vote. On October 11, 2018, the United States Senate confirmed his nomination by a 65–30 vote. He received his judicial commission on November 5, 2018. He became Chief Judge on March 19, 2022.

=== Notable cases ===
In 2021, he sentenced serial killer Reta Mays to life in prison without parole plus 20 years for 7 murders and 1 attempted murder.

As of 2022, Kleeh is overseeing the trial for the murder of Whitey Bulger.

==== Second Amendment ====
On August 31, 2023, Kleeh upheld the Domestic Violence Offender Gun Ban and the National Firearms Act as applied to short-barreled shotguns under New York State Rifle Pistol Association, Inc. v. Bruen.

On December 1, 2023, Kleeh declared that the minimum age requirement for handgun purchases is unconstitutional under New York State Rifle & Pistol Association, Inc. v. Bruen.

Legal offices
Preceded by Irene Patricia Murphy Keeley	Judge of the United States District Court for the Northern District of West Virginia; 2018–present	Incumbent
Preceded by Gina M. Groh	Chief Judge of the United States District Court for the Northern District of West Virginia; 2022–present	Incumbent
