= John P. Bailey =

American judge (born 1951)

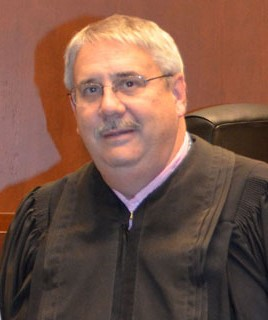

Chief Judge of the United States District Court for the Northern District of West Virginia
- In office 2008–2015
- Preceded by: Irene Patricia Murphy Keeley
- Succeeded by: Gina M. Groh

Judge of the United States District Court for the Northern District of West Virginia
- Incumbent
- Assumed office March 19, 2007
- Appointed by: George W. Bush
- Preceded by: Frederick Pfarr Stamp Jr.

Personal details
- Born: May 2, 1951 (age 74) Wheeling, West Virginia, U.S.
- Education: Dartmouth College (AB); West Virginia University (JD)

John Preston Bailey (born May 2, 1951) is a United States district judge of the United States District Court for the Northern District of West Virginia.

== Education and career ==
Bailey was born in Wheeling, West Virginia. He received a Bachelor of Arts degree from Dartmouth College in 1973 and a Juris Doctor from West Virginia University College of Law in 1976. He was a law clerk to Judge Charles H. Haden II of the United States District Court for the Northern and Southern Districts of West Virginia from 1976 to 1978. He was in private practice in Wheeling from 1978 to 2007, also serving as an assistant prosecuting attorney of Ohio County from 1985 to 1986, and a special assistant prosecuting attorney of Marshall County from 1985 to 1990.

=== Federal judicial service ===
On January 9, 2007, Bailey was nominated by President George W. Bush to a seat on the United States District Court for the Northern District of West Virginia vacated by Frederick Pfarr Stamp Jr. Bailey was confirmed by the United States Senate on March 15, 2007, and received his commission on March 19, 2007. He served as chief judge of the district from 2008 through 2015.

== Sources ==
Legal offices
Preceded by Frederick Pfarr Stamp Jr.	Judge of the United States District Court for the Northern District of West Virginia; 2007–present	Incumbent
Preceded by Irene Patricia Murphy Keeley	Chief Judge of the United States District Court for the Northern District of West Virginia; 2008–2015	Succeeded by Gina M. Groh
