= Gina M. Groh =

American judge (born 1964)

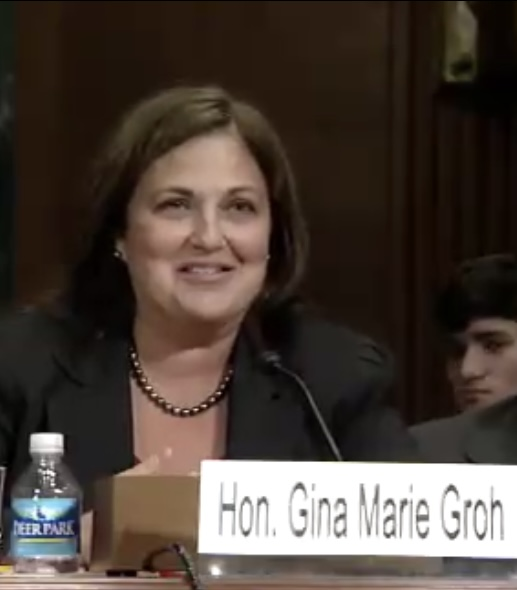

Chief Judge of the United States District Court for the Northern District of West Virginia
- In office March 19, 2015 – March 19, 2022
- Preceded by: John P. Bailey
- Succeeded by: Tom Kleeh

Judge of the United States District Court for the Northern District of West Virginia
- Incumbent
- Assumed office March 20, 2012
- Appointed by: Barack Obama
- Preceded by: W. Craig Broadwater

Personal details
- Born: Gina Marie Householder; 1964 (age 61–62) Hagerstown, Maryland, U.S.
- Education: Shepherd University (BS); West Virginia University (JD)

Gina Marie Groh (née Householder; born 1964) is an American lawyer who serves as a United States district judge of the United States District Court for the Northern District of West Virginia.

== Early life and education ==
A native of Williamsport, Maryland, Groh received a Bachelor of Science degree, summa cum laude from Shepherd College in 1986. She received the McMurran Scholar Award, the highest academic honor granted by Shepherd. In 1989 she received a Juris Doctor from West Virginia University College of Law.

== Career ==
After law school, Groh worked at the law firm of Steptoe & Johnson from 1989 to 1991 and Mell, Brownell & Baker from 1991 to 1995. She took a position with the firm Semmes, Bowen & Semmes from 1995 to 1998. Groh became an Assistant Prosecuting Attorney for Berkeley County, West Virginia between the years of 1998 to 2002. From 2002 until 2006, she was an Assistant Prosecuting Attorney for Jefferson County, West Virginia. In 2006, she was appointed by (then) Governor Joe Manchin as a Judge of the 23rd Judicial Circuit Court of West Virginia. She was the first female Judge to serve in the 23rd Judicial Circuit and at the time of her appointment was only the third female circuit judge in West Virginia. She served as a circuit court judge from her appointment in 2006 until March 19, 2012 when she resigned in order to receive her federal judicial commission. She is the first United States District Judge from the Eastern Panhandle of West Virginia.

=== Federal judicial service ===
In March 2011, Senators Joe Manchin and Jay Rockefeller recommended Groh to President Barack Obama to fill a vacant seat on the United States District Court for the Northern District of West Virginia. On May 19, 2011, Groh was nominated by the president to fill the seat of Judge W. Craig Broadwater, who died in 2006. Her nomination was reported out of the Senate Judiciary Committee on October 6, 2011 by a voice vote. On March 15, 2012, the Senate confirmed Groh by a 95–2 vote. She received her commission on March 20, 2012. Her formal investiture ceremony took place on October 19, 2012, at Shepherd University. She served as Chief Judge from 2015 to 2022.

Legal offices
Preceded by W. Craig Broadwater	Judge of the United States District Court for the Northern District of West Virginia; 2012–present	Incumbent
Preceded by John P. Bailey	Chief Judge of the United States District Court for the Northern District of West Virginia; 2015–2022	Succeeded by Tom Kleeh
