= Charles W. Bates =

American architect (1878–1929)

Charles Winning Bates
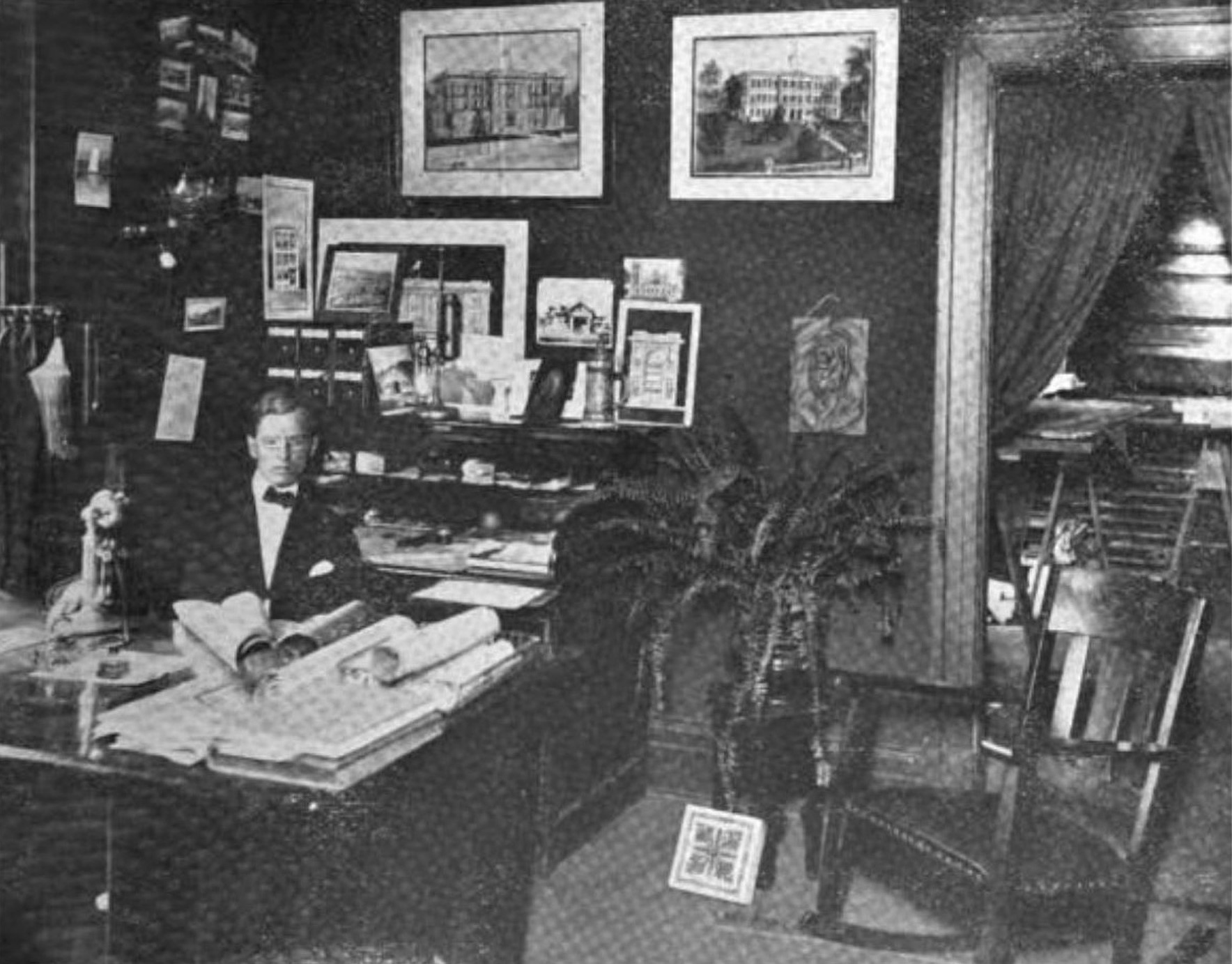
- Office of Charles W. Bates, 1909.
- Born: December 27, 1878; Wheeling, West Virginia
- Died: 1929 (aged 50–51); Wheeling, West Virginia
- Occupation: Architect
- Buildings: Edemar, Capitol Theatre, National Bank of West Virginia

Charles W. Bates (1878–1929) was an American architect who practiced primarily in Wheeling, West Virginia, and was one of the region's most successful architects. He mostly specialized in commercial and school buildings in the north Ohio River valley.

Born December 27, 1878, in Wheeling, Bates first attended the local public schools, then completed his education at the Linsly Military Institute. He studied architecture and engineering at the Armour Institute of Technology, in Chicago. In Chicago, he worked for D. H. Burnham & Company and Horatio R. Wilson. He then went to Pittsburgh, where he worked for several more architects before taking a job in the architectural department of the Pennsylvania Railroad. Bates then went abroad, returning in 1907. Upon his return, he established the firm of Rudolph & Bates with A. W. Rudolph in Altoona, central Pennsylvania. This firm was dissolved a year later and Bates returned to Wheeling, where he remained for the rest of his life and career.

Bates was one of the region's leading architects, with his chief local competitor being the older Frederick F. Faris. He designed many of the area's largest buildings, including four 10-story structures and the public library in Wheeling, and the high schools in a number of towns. Overviews of his work were published in 1909 and 1912.

== Selected works ==
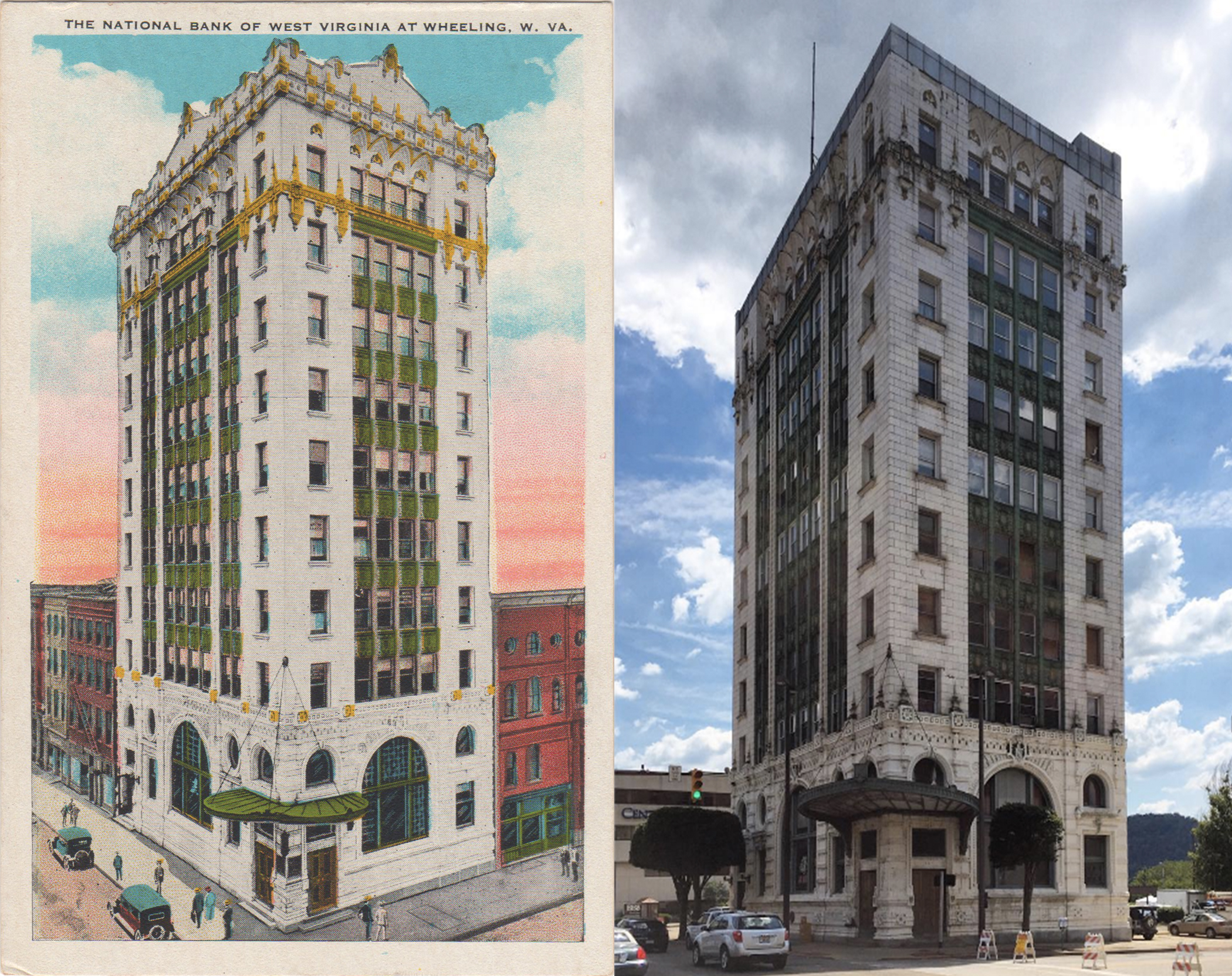
Two views of Bates' National Bank of West Virginia in Wheeling, later home to the W.M. Marsh Drug Company, built 1914-15. At left is the original structure as depicted in a postcard ca. 1915, and at right is the building in 2016, shorn of its elaborate entablature.

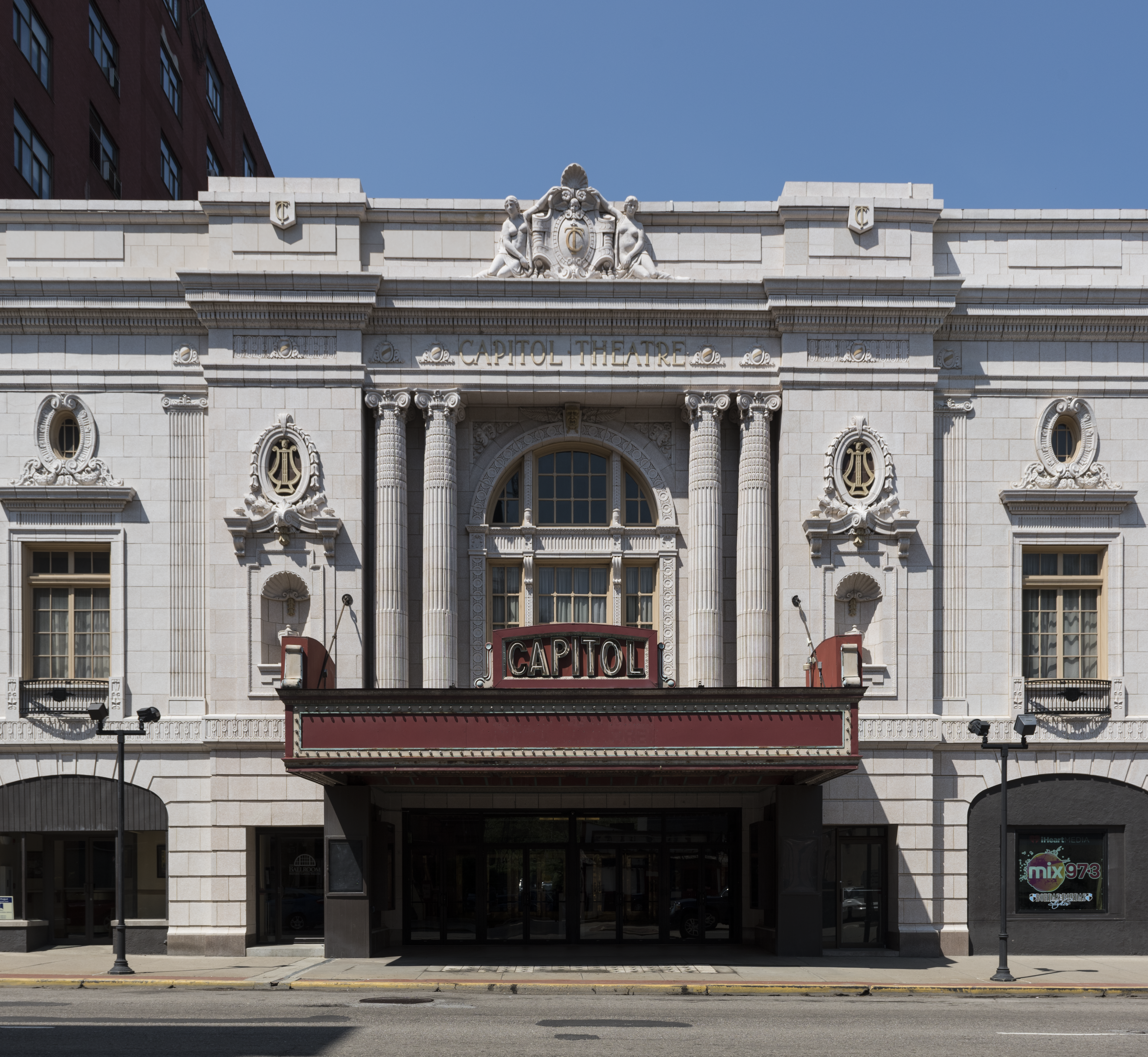
Capitol Theatre, Wheeling, 1928.

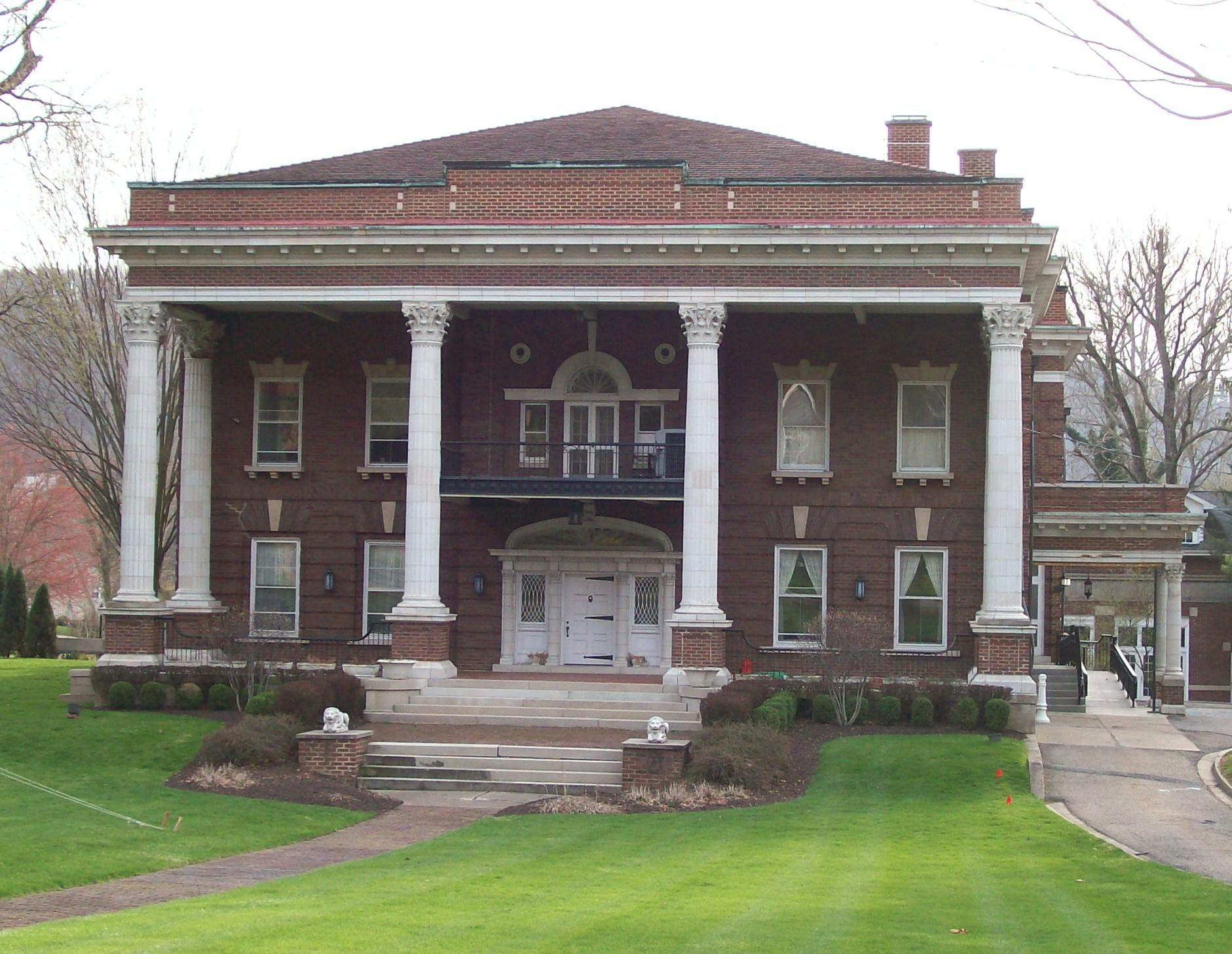
Edemar, Wheeling, 1910.

1909

- Rose Hill School, Monroe St, Bellaire, Ohio

1910

- First United Presbyterian Church, 3358 Guernsey St, Bellaire, Ohio
- Edward F. Stifel House (Edemar), 1330 National Rd, Wheeling, West Virginia
- Wheeling Public Library (Old), 2100 Market St, Wheeling, West Virginia

1911

- First Ward School, Belmont St, Bellaire, Ohio
- Westover School, East St, Westover, West Virginia

1912

- Cairo School, School St, Cairo, West Virginia
- Hawley Building, 1025 Main St, Wheeling, West Virginia

1913

- Neuralgyline Building, 88 19th St, Wheeling, West Virginia
- Rodewig Building, 3127 Belmont St, Bellaire, Ohio

1914

- National Bank of West Virginia Building, 1201 Main St, Wheeling, West Virginia
- Morgantown High School, 300 Spruce St, Morgantown, West Virginia (demolished)
- Peoples Savings Bank Building, 30 S 4th St, Martins Ferry, Ohio

1915

- Farmers and Merchants National Bank Building, 3195 Union St, Bellaire, Ohio
- Fenray Theatre, 21 S 4th St, Martins Ferry, Ohio (demolished)

1916

- Claysville High School, Main St, Claysville, Pennsylvania (demolished)
- First National Bank Building, 1388 Main St, Smithfield, Ohio
- German Savings Bank Building, 103 S 4th St, Martins Ferry, Ohio

1917

- Elm Junior High School, 808 Elm St, Martins Ferry, Ohio (demolished)
- Hoeveler Storage Warehouse, 750 S Millvale Ave, Pittsburgh, Pennsylvania
- Point Pleasant High School, 1200 Main St, Point Pleasant, West Virginia
- Yorkville School, Market St, Yorkville, Ohio

1918

- Miller Avenue School, 734 Miller Ave, Clairton, Pennsylvania (demolished)
- Moundsville High School, Tomlinson Ave, Moundsville, West Virginia (demolished)

1919

- Bank of Morgantown (Citizens) Building, 265 High St, Morgantown, West Virginia
- Wellsville High School, Center St, Wellsville, Ohio

1920

- Harding High School, Vine St, Fairport Harbor, Ohio.

1921

- 12th Street Garage, 79-81 12th St, Wheeling, West Virginia
- Metropolitan Theatre, 371 High St, Morgantown, West Virginia

1922

- Colson Hall, West Virginia University, Morgantown, West Virginia
- Riley Law Building, 45 14th St, Wheeling, West Virginia
- Charles R. Shreve High School, Hanover St, Martins Ferry, Ohio

1923

- Clairton High School, Waddell Ave, Clairton, Pennsylvania (highly altered)

1924

- Central Union Trust Building, 40 14th St, Wheeling, West Virginia

1925

- Bellaire High School, 35th St, Bellaire, Ohio

1927

- Pythian Theatre, 1025 Chapline St, Wheeling, West Virginia

1928

- Cadiz High School, 440 E Market St, Cadiz, Ohio
- Capitol Theatre, 1015 Main St, Wheeling, West Virginia

1929

- Bridgeport High School, W Bennett St, Bridgeport, Ohio
