= Alston G. Dayton =

American judge (1857–1920)

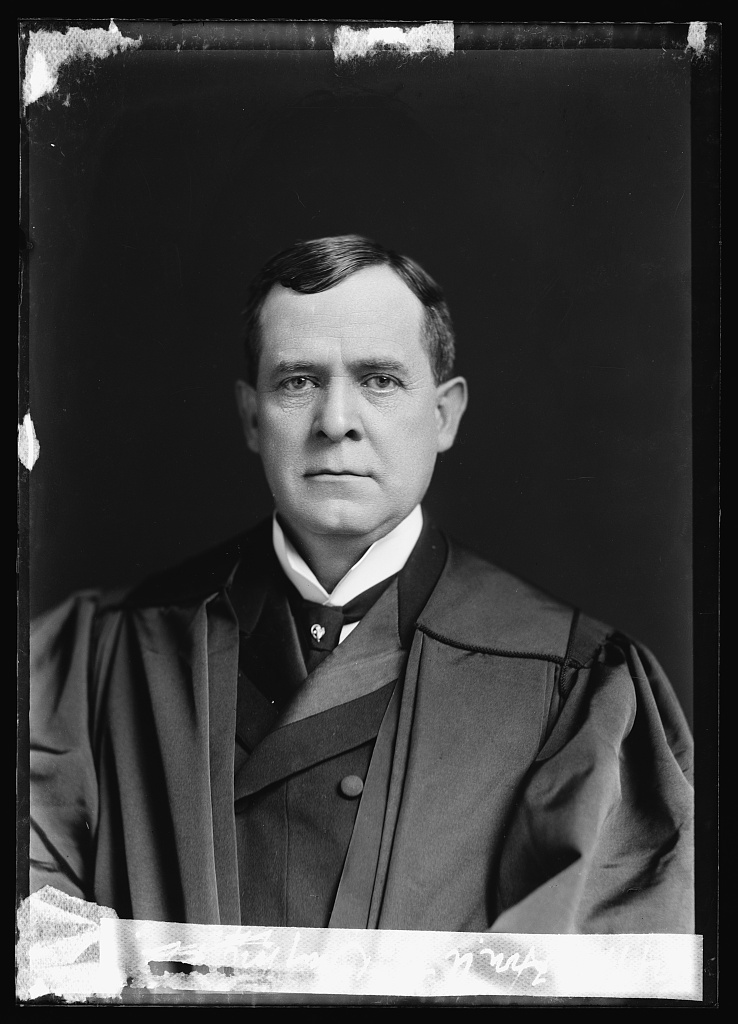
- Dayton c. 1905

Judge of the United States District Court for the Northern District of West Virginia
- In office March 14, 1905 – July 30, 1920
- Appointed by: Theodore Roosevelt
- Preceded by: John Jay Jackson Jr.
- Succeeded by: William E. Baker

Member of the U.S. House of Representatives from West Virginia's 2nd district
- In office March 4, 1895 – March 16, 1905
- Preceded by: William Lyne Wilson
- Succeeded by: Thomas Beall Davis

Personal details
- Born: Alston Gordon Dayton; October 18, 1857 Philippi, Virginia
- Died: July 30, 1920 (aged 62) Battle Creek, Michigan
- Resting place: Fraternity Cemetery; Philippi, West Virginia
- Party: Republican
- Education: West Virginia University (A.B., M.A.) read law

Alston Gordon Dayton (October 18, 1857 – July 30, 1920) was a United States representative from West Virginia and a United States district judge of the United States District Court for the Northern District of West Virginia.

== Education and career ==
Born on October 18, 1857, in Philippi, Virginia (now West Virginia), Dayton attended the public schools, read law and received an Artium Baccalaureus degree from West Virginia University in 1878, then received a Master of Arts degree in 1880 from the same institution. He was admitted to the bar and entered private practice in Philippi from 1878 to 1879, with his father Spencer Dayton. He was prosecutor for Upshur County, West Virginia from 1879 to 1884. He was prosecutor for Barbour County, West Virginia from 1884 to 1888. He resumed private practice in West Virginia from 1886 to 1895.

== Congressional service ==
Dayton was elected as a Republican from West Virginia's 2nd congressional district to the United States House of Representatives of the 54th United States Congress and to the five succeeding Congresses and served from March 4, 1895, until his resignation March 16, 1905, to accept a federal judicial position.

== Federal judicial service ==
Dayton was nominated by President Theodore Roosevelt on March 7, 1905, to a seat on the United States District Court for the Northern District of West Virginia vacated by Judge John Jay Jackson Jr. He was confirmed by the United States Senate on March 14, 1905, and received his commission the same day. His service terminated on July 30, 1920, due to his death in Battle Creek, Michigan. He was interred in Fraternity Cemetery in Philippi.

== See also ==
- West Virginia's congressional delegations

== Sources ==
- United States Congress. "Alston G. Dayton (id: D000163)". Biographical Directory of the United States Congress.
- Alston Gordon Dayton at the Biographical Directory of Federal Judges, a publication of the Federal Judicial Center.

U.S. House of Representatives
Preceded by William Lyne Wilson	Member of the U.S. House of Representatives from West Virginia's 2nd congressional district 1895–1905	Succeeded by Thomas Beall Davis
Legal offices
Preceded by John Jay Jackson Jr.	Judge of the United States District Court for the Northern District of West Virginia; 1905–1920	Succeeded by William E. Baker
