= Klieves, Kraft & Company =

American architectural and construction firm

Klieves, Kraft & Company was a building contractor and architectural firm in Wheeling, West Virginia. The firm was involved in the construction of West Virginia University's Woodburn Hall in the 1870s, among other historic structures in the state of West Virginia.

== History ==
Established in 1868 by Charles C. Kraft, who emigrated from the Kingdom of Hanover in Germany in 1834, and Theodore C. Klieves who also emigrated from the Kingdom of Hanover in Germany in 1846, the firm later added Edgar W. Wells as a partner in 1878, as lead architect and designer.

Klieves, Kraft & Company stood at the head of the architecture, contracting and building business of West Virginia, building such historic structures as Woodburn Hall (the original building of West Virginia University, completed in 1876 at a cost of $41,500), and the homes of A. W. Kelly, George E. Stifel, Dr. Hazlett, A. W. Paull, McKinley, and other structures.

== Partners ==
- Bernard Klieves, president
- Charles C. Kraft, treasurer
- F. B. Klieves, secretary
- Edgar W. Wells, architect and designer

== National Register of Historic Places ==
Buildings on the National Register of Historic Places attributed to Klieves, Kraft & Company or its architects include:

- Centre Market Square Historic District (Wheeling, WV)
- Chapline Street Row Historic District (Wheeling, WV)
- Monroe Street East Historic District (Wheeling, WV)
- Robert W. Hazlett House (Wheeling, WV)
- Oglebay Mansion Museum (in Oglebay Park, Wheeling, WV)
- Woodburn Quadrangle (at West Virginia University, Morgantown, WV)
