= Oglebay Park =

Municipal park in Wheeling, West Virginia, United States

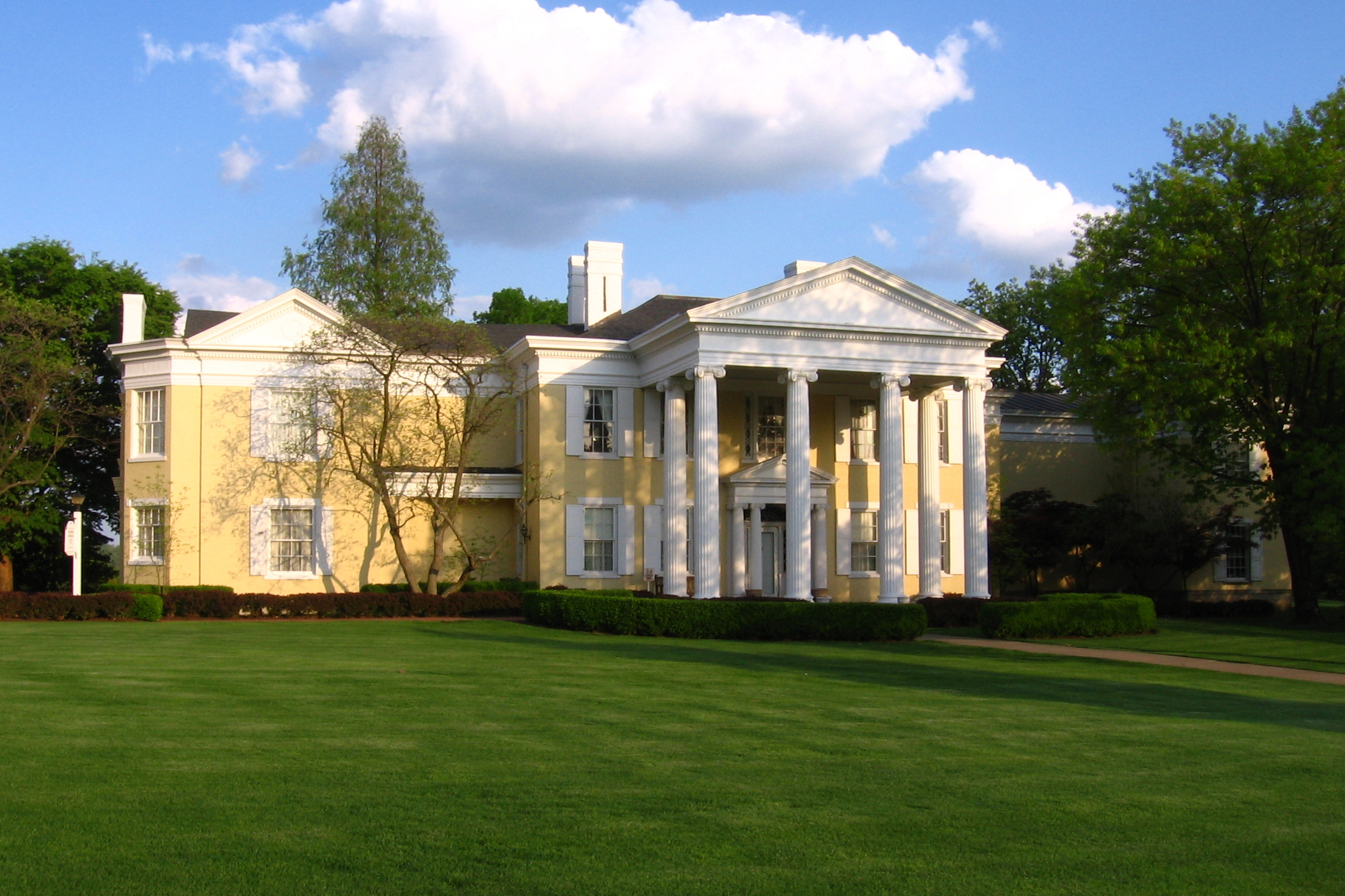
- Oglebay Mansion Museum
- Interactive map of Oglebay Park
- Type: Municipal park
- Location: 465 Lodge Drive, Wheeling WV 26003
- Created: July 28, 1928
- Operator: Wheeling Park Commission
- Visitors: 3+ million
- Status: Open all year
- Website: https://oglebay.com/
- Oglebay Mansion Museum
- U.S. National Register of Historic Places
- Location within West Virginia Location within the United States
- Location: Oglebay Park, Wheeling, West Virginia
- Coordinates: 40°6′7″N 80°40′8″W
- Area: 1,650 acres (667.7 ha)
- Built: 1846
- Architect: Hanson Chapline, renovations by Edward B. Franzheim and the Klieves, Kraft and Company
- NRHP reference No.: 79002595
- Added to NRHP: August 29, 1979

Oglebay Park is a self-supporting public municipal park, the only one of its kind, located on the outskirts of Wheeling, West Virginia, on 1,650 acres (670 ha). In 1926, Earl W. Oglebay (of Oglebay, Norton, and Company) deeded his estate, Waddington Farms, to the city of Wheeling for the express purpose of public recreation. The park has been open to the public since 1928 when its governing body, the Wheeling Park Commission, began operations.

Several Waddington Farms buildings, including the Mansion Museum and the greenhouse, remain in use today. Others, such as the Carriage House, have been rebuilt in the style of the original structures. Placed on the National Register of Historic Places in 1979, the Oglebay Mansion is operated as a museum by the Oglebay Institute.

The park currently incorporates two championship golf courses, two standard courses (9-hole and 18-hole), one par three course, eleven tennis courts, a large outdoor pool, extensive walking trails, the Good Zoo, the Mansion Museum (operated by the Oglebay Institute), gardens, a greenhouse, the Oglebay Amphitheater, the Oglebay Lodge (containing over 250 rooms), 54 cottages, The Schrader Environmental Education Center (a nature center operated by the Oglebay Institute), a planetarium (located within the Good Zoo), a ski slope, Camp Russel, and Schenk Lake, which is used for fishing, pedal boating, Segway tours, and the Speidel Observatory.

Annual events at the park include but are not limited to: The Festival of Lights, Oglebayfest, the Ohio County Fair, the West Virginia Open (tennis), and Fort Henry Days (a living history weekend).

== Oglebay Mansion and Waddington Farm ==
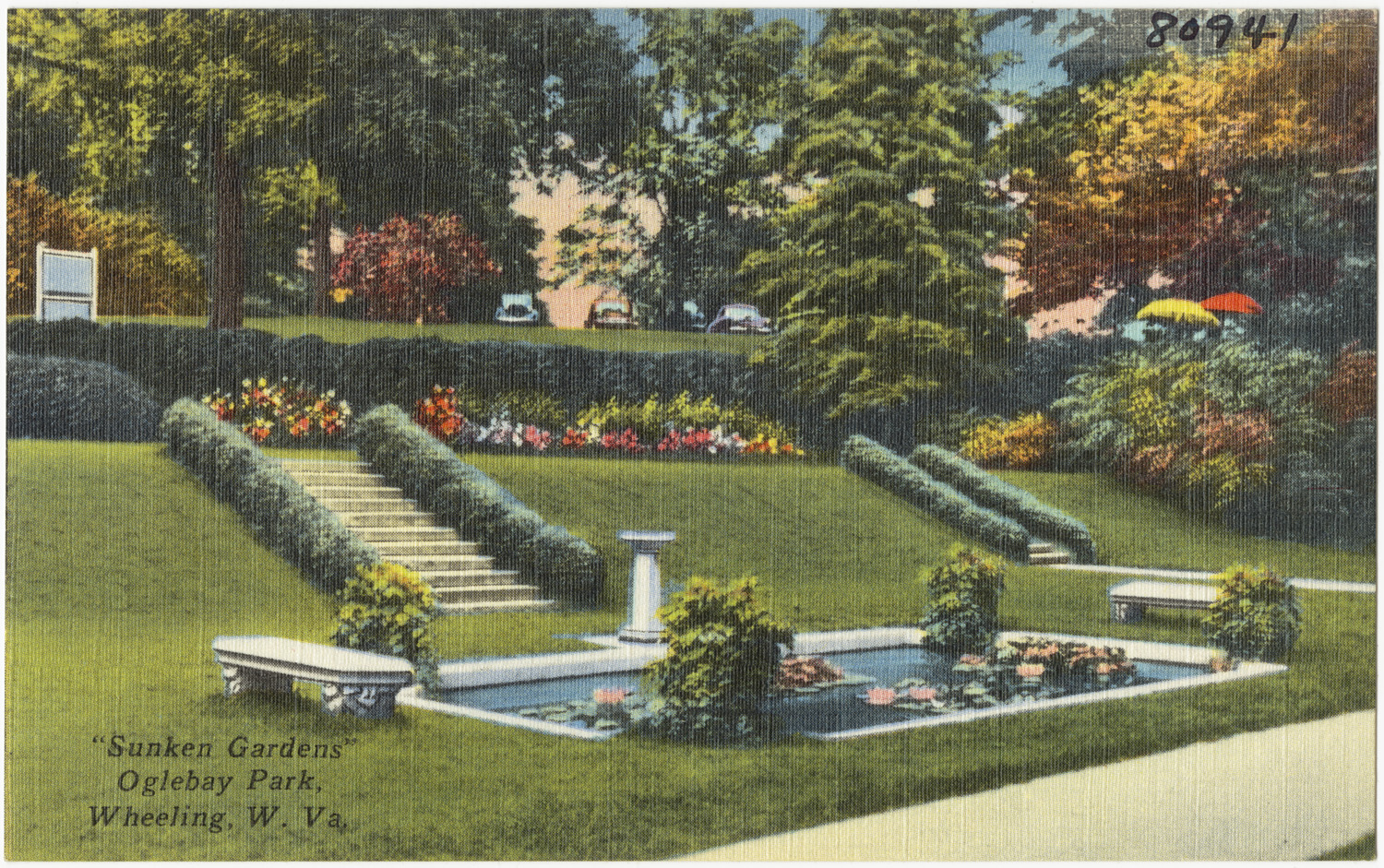
Sunken Gardens, c. 1930-1945.

The Oglebay Mansion was built in 1846 by Paul Matvey as an eight-room farmhouse. Earl W. Oglebay, co-founder of the Oglebay-Norton Company, purchased the mansion and its 25 acres (10 ha) adjoining areas in 1900, renamed it Waddington Farm, and used it as his summer estate and model farm. He was the ninth owner of the home and its adjoining land and expanded the farmhouse into a mansion by adding additional wings and architectural features like the front portico.

Oglebay gradually expanded the estate by purchasing adjacent farms until Waddington Farm had grown from 25 acres (10 ha) to 750 acres (300 ha) at the time of his death in 1926. The mansion became a museum in 1930. The museum, which includes restored rooms, local history exhibits, and exhibits on Earl W. Oglebay and his former estate, is operated by the Oglebay Institute and is open to the public for tours and programs throughout the year.

The mansion before Earl W. Oglebay made major renovations to the original farmhouse.

Earl W. Oglebay's hope was to develop Waddington Farm as a model farm, a laboratory for new agricultural changes that could be used to end the great starvation in the United States. He lent out parts of the farm to various researchers so that they could learn about crop rotation, soil improvement, and cost-cutting methods. Waddington Farm once incorporated a dairy farm, a poultry farm, a pig farm, and a sheep farm as well as stables, vineyards, a greenhouse, a rose garden, groves of fruit trees, vegetable gardens for the consumption of those living within the estate, and the areas used to research agricultural techniques. Oglebay's unconventional farming methods resulted in criticism by the agricultural community. To them, he was "a man from the city trying outlandish things", but after they saw the results of his experiments, they thought differently.

== Festival of Lights ==
This 1985 holiday tradition began at Oglebay Park but soon spread throughout the city of Wheeling. The first year, displays and landscape lighting covered 125 acres (51 ha) over a three-mile (5 km) drive throughout the resort. The show now covers more than 300 acres (120 ha) over a six-mile (10 km) drive throughout the park. Landscape lighting expert Dick Bosch and the late Robert J. Otten, Wheeling Park Commission's long-time creative director, were the creative talents behind Oglebay's party. Bosch's lighting expertise was needed to produce the lighting for trees and buildings, and Bob Otten designed the first five displays for the 1985 opening and created nearly 50 additional displays until his death in 2005.

Every year, several new displays are added. Notable displays from past years include the Snowflake Tunnel, a display that allows visitors to drive through a lighted tunnel portraying thousands of twinkling snowflakes, the massive Polyhedron Star, which includes over 2,000 lights, and the Poinsettia Wreath and Candle, which is the festival's tallest. Other displays include the Candy Cane Wreath, The Twelve Days of Christmas, or Willard the Snowman, named for the television personality Willard Scott, who switched on the lights for Light-Up Night in 1986. In past years, local students in Ohio County Schools submitted new display ideas. Most displays were fabricated at Wheeling Park High School, where welding technology students built the frames for the displays. The school's electronics technology program has designed, built, and programmed the controls for every animated display at the festival. The high school's radio station WPHP 91.9 also broadcasts seasonal music along with information about the resort and overall light show.

Two of the park's light displays are synchronized to music in the early 2000s. "Gardens of Light" and the Good Zoo's "Lighting and Music Extravaganza" were designed by Carson Williams, who created the original Wizards in Winter light display at his home in Mason, Ohio. The Good Zoo's light party, added in 2006, utilizes upwards of 35,500 LED bulbs and is controlled by a computer. This technology allows the lights to be synchronized with music. The "Gardens of Light" display, which was added in 2007, is very similar to the Good Zoo's light party, but on a much larger scale. In this display, park visitors walk through the gardens, which incorporate hanging flower baskets with lights and lighted flowers in the flowerbeds. The "Gardens of Light" display is an attempt to recreate the look of Oglebay Park's flower gardens during the spring and summer months.

In 2008, Oglebay announced that all new displays will use LED lights, rather than the incandescent lights that were used before. In addition, the park will gradually convert the existing displays to use LED lights. The new lights will use 85% less energy and last five times longer, according to Oglebay's website.

== Oglebay Good Zoo ==
The Oglebay Good Zoo is a 30-acre (12 ha) facility that houses over 68 species of animals. The zoo was dedicated in memory of a seven-year-old boy, Philip Mayer Good, who loved nature. He was the son of Barbara and Larry Good of Wheeling. As of 2026, the Good Zoo's collection includes cheetahs, zebras, kangaroos, wallabies, tamarins, lemurs, ostriches, llamas, goats, barn owls, bald eagles, red pandas, gorals, peacocks, white-naped cranes, and many other animals from all over the globe. There is a discovery lab, with an indoor South American rainforest exhibit, and more. The Good Zoo is the only Association of Zoos and Aquariums (AZA) accredited zoo in West Virginia.

The Good Zoo is also home to a veterinary hospital where visitors can view operations and routine checkups. The hospital is used as a treatment area for zoo animals, a breeding center for certain species, a quarantine area for incoming animals, and a rehabilitation center for wild raptors. The zoo's raptor rehabilitation program has successfully treated many raptors and other native birds since its establishment. The zoo's turkey vultures, bald eagles are two of the animals on exhibit.

The Good Zoo has many SSP programs. The Species Survival Plan (SSP) is a cooperative breeding and conservation program instituted by the AZA. The goal of SSP programs is to help as many species as possible through captive breeding, education, research, and habitat preservation.

Annual events at the Good Zoo include "Boo at the Zoo" (in October), and "The Good Zoo Lights Up For You" (during the Festival of Lights) an annual car show at nearby Camp Russel, and an Easter egg hunt.

== Gallery ==
Crispin Center (The golf clubhouse).

View of the golf course.

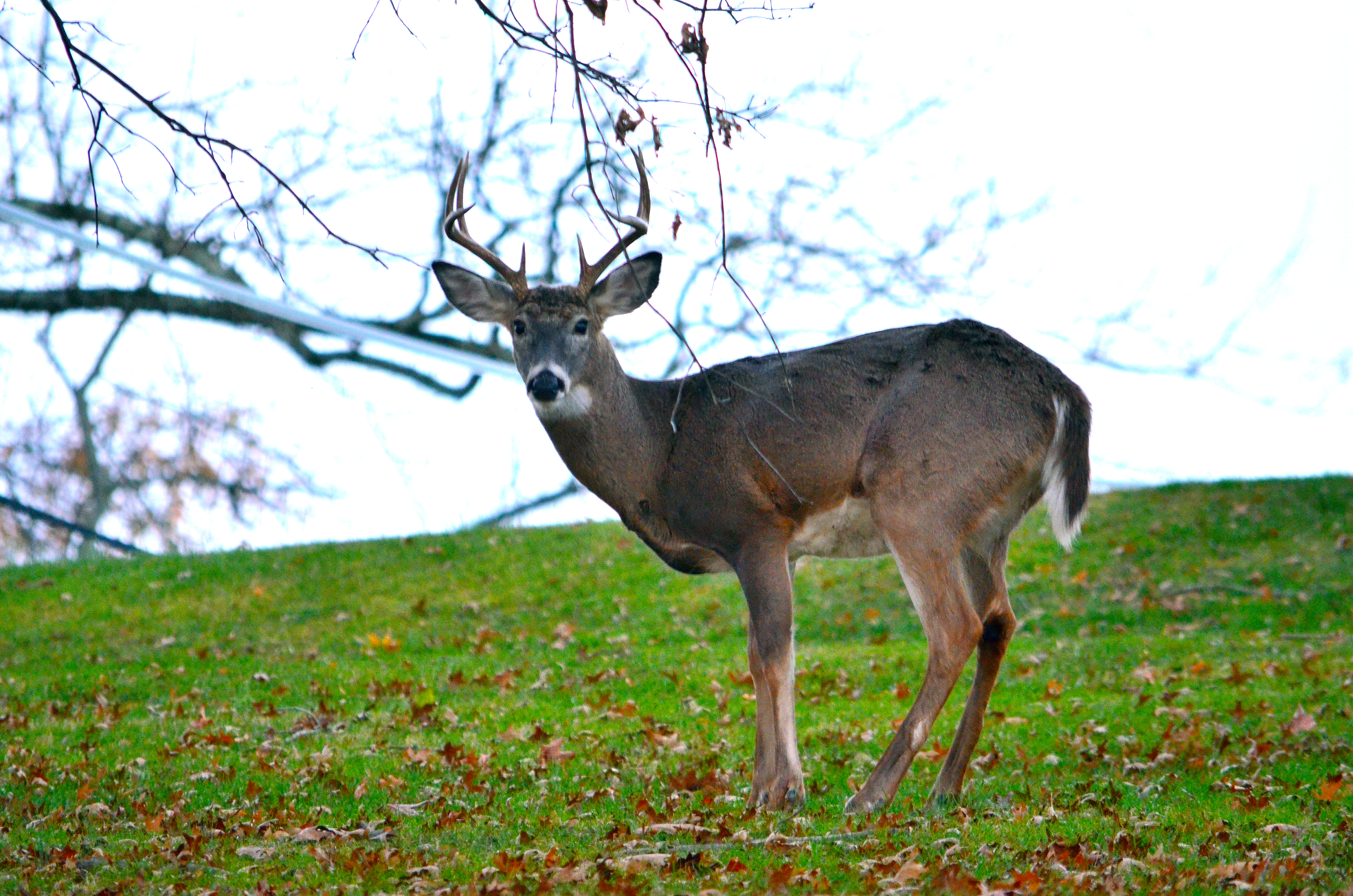
A buck at the park.

Lake and fountain at the park.

Wilson Lodge (A 271-room lodge).

Camp Russel

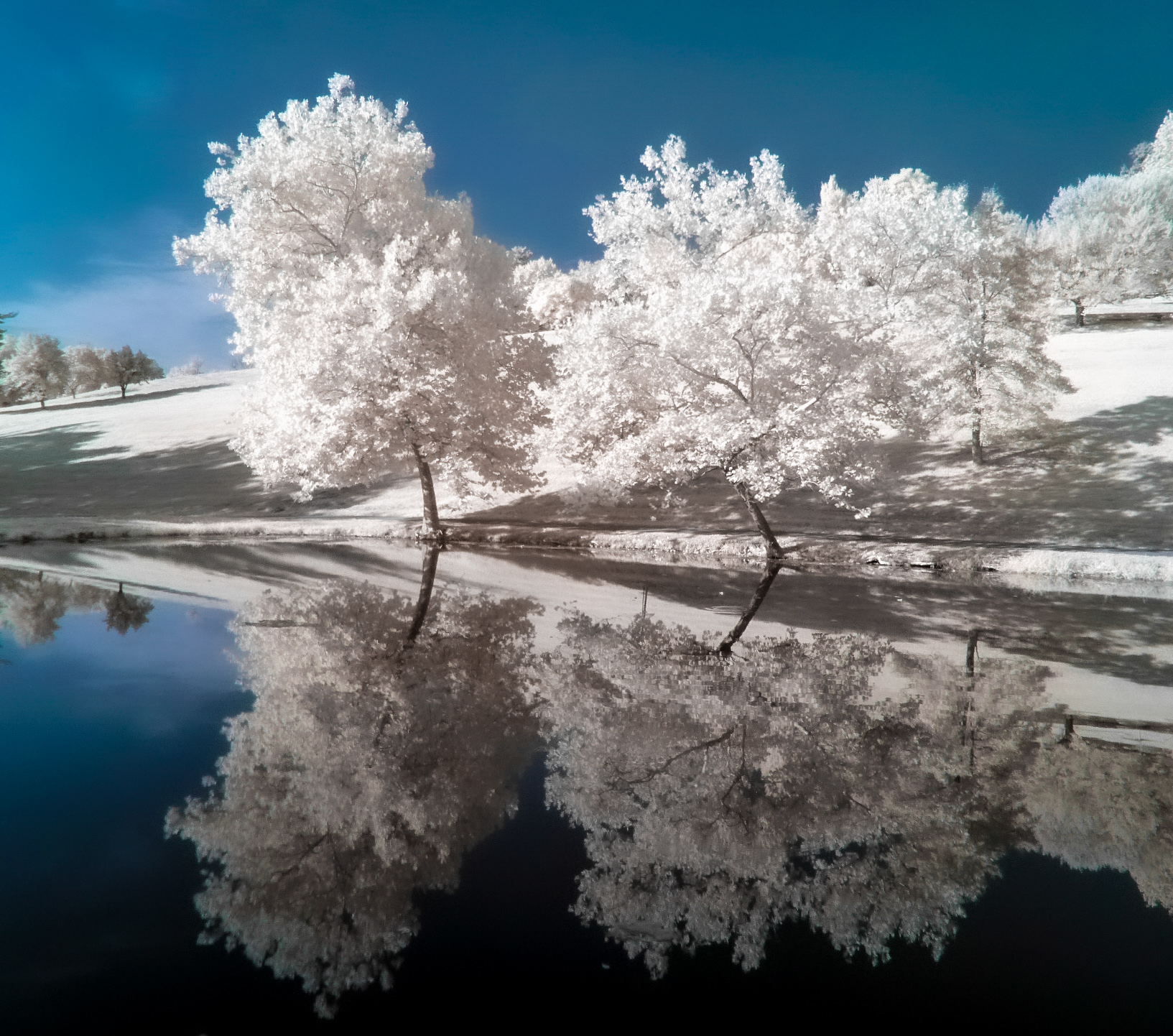
Infrared photograph of the park in winter.
