= Frederick Pfarr Stamp Jr. =

American judge (born 1934)

Senior Judge of the United States District Court for the Northern District of West Virginia
- Incumbent
- Assumed office November 1, 2006

Chief Judge of the United States District Court for the Northern District of West Virginia
- In office 1994–2001
- Preceded by: Robert Earl Maxwell
- Succeeded by: Irene Patricia Murphy Keeley

Judge of the United States District Court for the Northern District of West Virginia
- In office July 12, 1990 – November 1, 2006
- Appointed by: George H. W. Bush
- Preceded by: William Matthew Kidd
- Succeeded by: John P. Bailey

Personal details
- Born: July 24, 1934 (age 91) Wheeling, West Virginia, U.S.
- Education: Washington and Lee University (BA); University of Virginia School of Law; University of Richmond School of Law (LLB)

Frederick Pfarr Stamp Jr. (born July 24, 1934) is an inactive Senior United States district judge of the United States District Court for the Northern District of West Virginia.

== Education and career ==
Stamp was born in Wheeling, West Virginia. He received a Bachelor of Arts degree from Washington and Lee University in 1956, and attended the University of Virginia School of Law before receiving a Bachelor of Laws from the University of Richmond School of Law in 1959. He was a private in the United States Army from 1959 to 1960, and a First Lieutenant in the United States Army Reserves from 1960 to 1967. He was in private practice in Wheeling from 1960 to 1990.

=== Federal judicial service ===
On May 11, 1990, Stamp was nominated by President George H. W. Bush to a seat on the United States District Court for the Northern District of West Virginia vacated by William M. Kidd. Stamp was confirmed by the United States Senate on June 28, 1990, and received his commission on July 12, 1990. He served as Chief Judge from 1994 to 2001. He assumed senior status on November 1, 2006.

== Sources ==
Legal offices
Preceded by William Matthew Kidd	Judge of the United States District Court for the Northern District of West Virginia; 1990–2006	Succeeded by John P. Bailey
Preceded by Robert Earl Maxwell	Chief Judge of the United States District Court for the Northern District of West Virginia; 1994–2001	Succeeded by Irene Patricia Murphy Keeley
