= Edemar =

Historic house in West Virginia, United States

- U.S. National Register of Historic Places
- U.S. Historic district
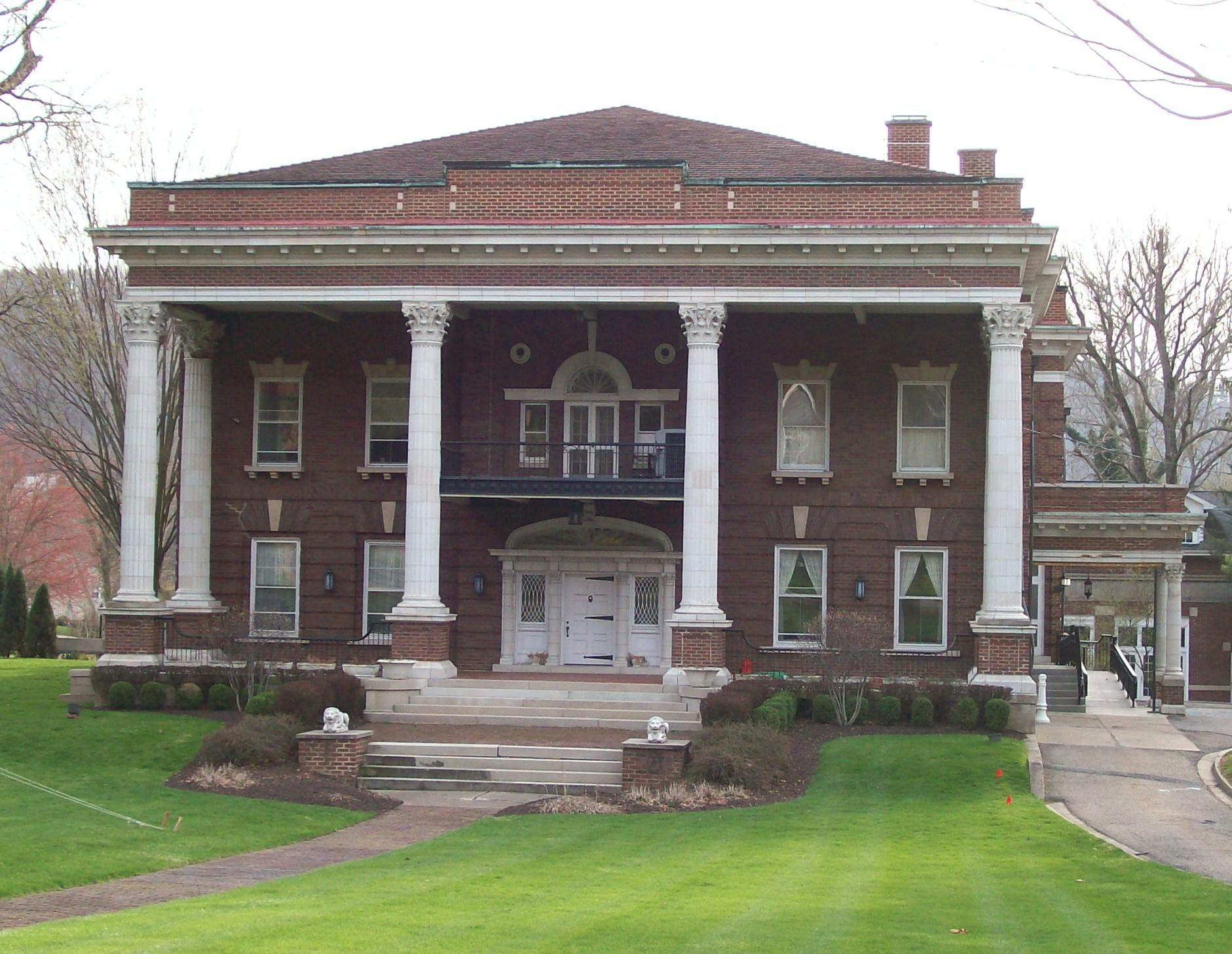
- Stifel Fine Arts Center, April 2010

- Location within West Virginia Location within the United States
- Location: 1330 National Rd., Wheeling, West Virginia
- Coordinates: 40°4′9″N 80°40′52″W
- Area: 2.8 acres (1.1 ha)
- Built: 1910
- Built by: Ross R. Kitchen
- Architect: Charles W. Bates
- Architectural style: Classical Revival
- NRHP reference No.: 91001728
- Added to NRHP: May 28, 1992

"Edemar", also known as Stifel Fine Arts Center, is a historic house and national historic district located at Wheeling, Ohio County, West Virginia. The district includes two contributing buildings and two contributing structures. The main house was built between 1910 and 1914, and is a 2 1/2-story, brick-and-concrete Classical Revival mansion with a steel frame. The front facade features a full-width portico with pediment supported by six Corinthian order columns. Also on the property are a contributing brick, tiled-roofed three-bay carriage barn/garage; fish pond; and formal garden. The Stifel family occupied the home until 1976, when the family gave it to the Oglebay Institute to be used as the Stifel Fine Arts Center.

It was listed on the National Register of Historic Places in 1992.
