= Sidney Lee Christie =

American judge

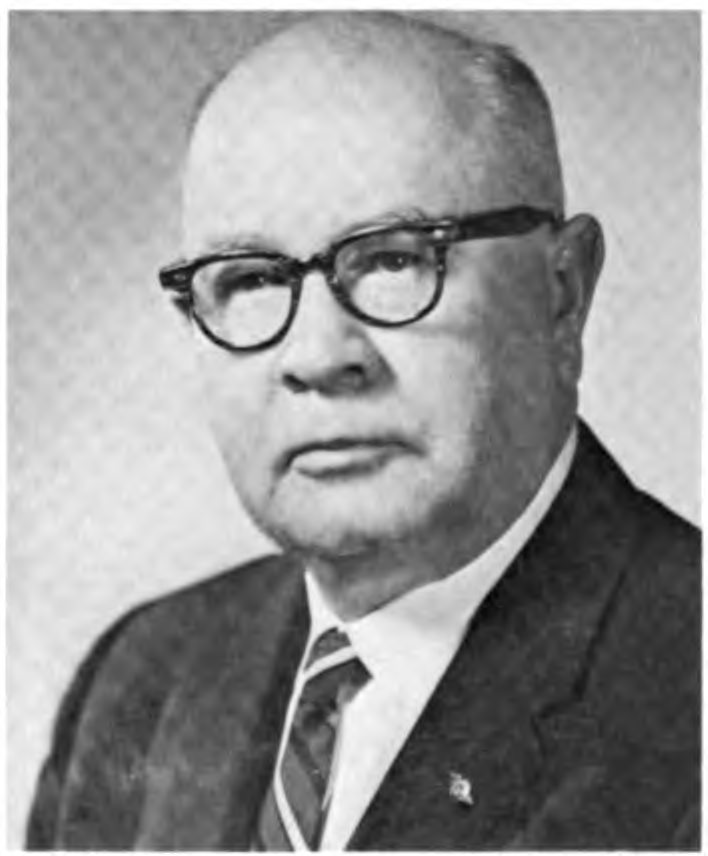

Chief Judge of the United States District Court for the Southern District of West Virginia
- In office 1971–1973
- Preceded by: John A. Field Jr.
- Succeeded by: Dennis Raymond Knapp

Judge of the United States District Court for the Northern District of West Virginia Judge of the United States District Court for the Southern District of West Virginia
- In office May 1, 1964 – February 15, 1974
- Appointed by: Lyndon B. Johnson
- Preceded by: Harry Evans Watkins
- Succeeded by: Charles Harold Haden II

Personal details
- Born: Sidney Lee Christie; April 17, 1903 Sinks Grove, West Virginia
- Died: February 15, 1974 (aged 70)
- Education: Dunsmore Business College (B.Bus.); Cumberland School of Law (LL.B.)

Sidney Lee Christie (April 17, 1903 – February 15, 1974) was a United States district judge of the United States District Court for the Northern District of West Virginia and the United States District Court for the Southern District of West Virginia.

== Education and career ==
Born in Sinks Grove, West Virginia, Christie received a Bachelor of Business degree from Dunsmore Business College (now closed) in 1924 and a Bachelor of Laws from Cumberland University's law school (now the Cumberland School of Law at Samford University) in 1928. He was in private practice from 1928 to 1960. He was divorce commissioner for the Circuit Court of McDowell County, West Virginia. He was a judge of the Circuit Court for the 8th Judicial Circuit of West Virginia from 1961 to 1964.

== Federal judicial service ==
Christie was nominated by President Lyndon B. Johnson on April 15, 1964, to a joint seat on the United States District Court for the Northern District of West Virginia and the United States District Court for the Southern District of West Virginia vacated by Judge Harry Evans Watkins. He was confirmed by the United States Senate on April 30, 1964, and received his commission on May 1, 1964. He served as Chief Judge of the Southern District from 1971 to 1973. His service was terminated on February 15, 1974, due to his death.

== Sources ==
Legal offices
Preceded by Harry Evans Watkins	Judge of the United States District Court for the Northern District of West Virginia; Judge of the United States District Court for the Southern District of West Virginia; 1964–1974	Succeeded by Charles Harold Haden II
Preceded by John A. Field Jr.	Chief Judge of the United States District Court for the Southern District of West Virginia; 1971–1973	Succeeded by Dennis Raymond Knapp
