= William E. Baker =

American judge

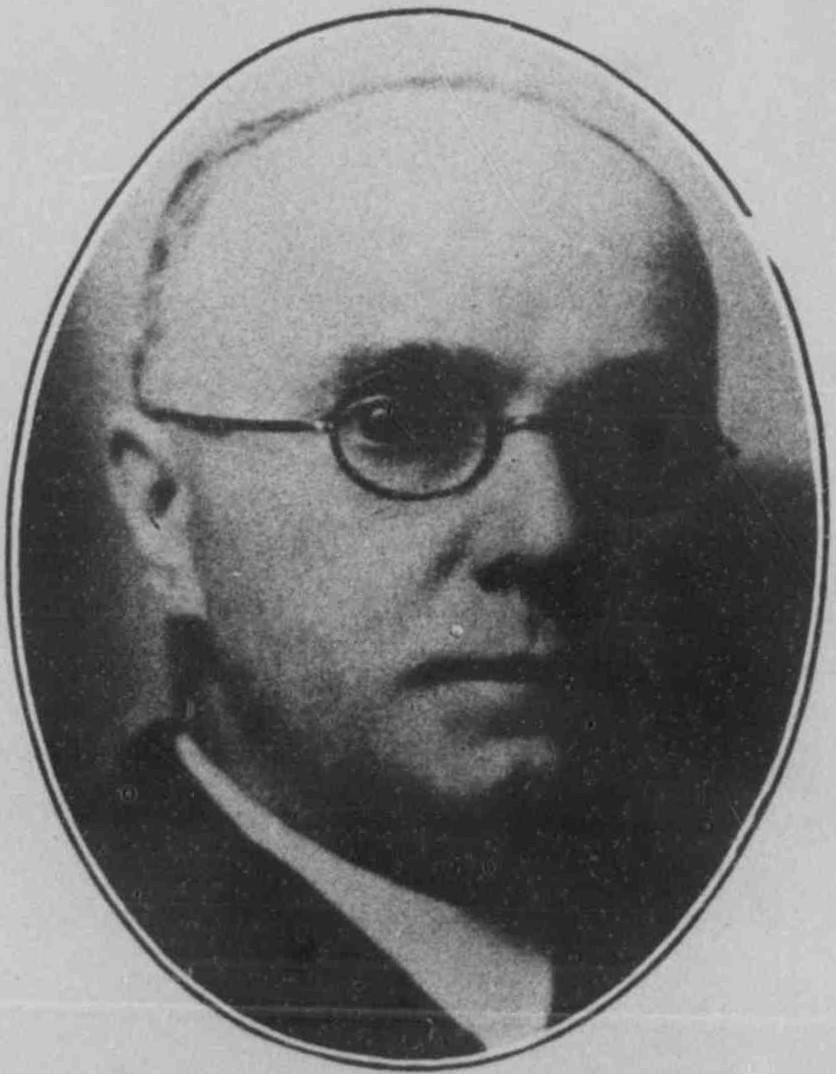

Senior Judge of the United States District Court for the Northern District of West Virginia
- In office April 3, 1954 – June 4, 1954

Chief Judge of the United States District Court for the Northern District of West Virginia
- In office 1948–1954
- Preceded by: Office established
- Succeeded by: Harry Evans Watkins

Judge of the United States District Court for the Northern District of West Virginia
- In office April 4, 1921 – April 3, 1954
- Appointed by: Warren G. Harding
- Preceded by: Alston G. Dayton
- Succeeded by: Herbert Stephenson Boreman

Personal details
- Born: William Eli Baker; February 25, 1873 Beverly, West Virginia
- Died: June 4, 1954 (aged 81) Beverly, West Virginia
- Education: West Virginia Wesleyan College (B.S.); West Virginia University (A.B., LL.B.)

William Eli Baker (February 25, 1873 – June 4, 1954), frequently known as W. E. Baker, was a United States district judge of the United States District Court for the Northern District of West Virginia.

== Education and career ==
Born in Beverly, West Virginia, Baker received a Bachelor of Science degree from West Virginia Wesleyan College in 1893 and an Artium Baccalaureus degree and a Bachelor of Laws from West Virginia University in 1896. He was in private practice in Elkins, West Virginia from 1896 to 1921. He was special counsel to United States Senators Stephen Benton Elkins and Henry Gassaway Davis, both of West Virginia. He was also prosecuting attorney of Randolph County, West Virginia from 1900 to 1912.

== Federal judicial service ==
Baker received a recess appointment from President Warren G. Harding on April 4, 1921, to a seat on the United States District Court for the Northern District of West Virginia vacated by Judge Alston G. Dayton. He was nominated to the same position by President Harding on April 14, 1921. He was confirmed by the United States Senate on May 3, 1921, and received his commission the same day. He served as Chief Judge from 1948 to 1954. He assumed senior status on April 3, 1954. His service terminated on June 4, 1954, due to his death in Beverly.

During his career, Baker would serve on the Fourth Circuit panel that decided Bliley v. West, which struck down Virginia's 1912 white primary.

== See also ==
- List of United States federal judges by longevity of service

== Sources ==
Legal offices
Preceded by Alston G. Dayton	Judge of the United States District Court for the Northern District of West Virginia; 1921–1954	Succeeded by Herbert Stephenson Boreman
Preceded by Office established	Chief Judge of the United States District Court for the Northern District of West Virginia; 1948–1954	Succeeded by Harry Evans Watkins
