= Federal Building and United States Courthouse (Wheeling, West Virginia, 1907) =

- U.S. Post Office and Courthouse
- U.S. Historic district – Contributing property

- Location within West Virginia Location within the United States
- Location: 1125 Chapline Street, Wheeling, West Virginia
- Coordinates: 40°4′7″N 80°43′17.5″W
- Built: 1905
- Architectural style: Beaux-arts
- Part of: Wheeling Historic District (ID79002597)
- Designated CP: December 31, 1979

The Frederick P. Stamp, Jr. Federal Building and U.S. Courthouse, Wheeling, West Virginia is a courthouse of the United States District Court for the Northern District of West Virginia located in the city of Wheeling, West Virginia. Built in 1907, the building still serves its original function, and was renovated and expanded in 1937, and again in 2004. In 1979, it was listed in the National Register of Historic Places in 1979 as a contributing building to the Wheeling Historic District.

== Building history ==
In 1849, the first suspension bridge spanning the Ohio River was constructed at Wheeling, providing a new route to the West along the National Road. The Baltimore & Ohio Railroad mainline reached Wheeling in 1853, prompting a dramatic increase in population, commerce, and industry. As a result of its proximity to important transportation routes, Wheeling prospered. It served as the capital of West Virginia from 1863 to 1870 and 1875 to 1885. Consequently, Wheeling outgrew the 1859 U.S. Custom House (now West Virginia Independence Hall) designed by Ammi B. Young. In 1902, federal officials obtained a site for a proposed new structure. The public initially criticized the site selection because it was located away from the center of the city. However, following the 1907 completion of the building, which included a post office, courthouse, and custom house, development soon shifted to the north.

The Federal Building and U.S. Courthouse was constructed under the Tarsney Act of 1893, which allowed the United States Department of the Treasury to hold competitions for the design of select federal buildings with the intention of improving governmental architecture's quality. The Wheeling federal building, designed in the Beaux Arts Classicism style, set a high standard for architectural excellence. Marsh & Peter, a prominent firm with several Washington, D.C., commissions, designed the building. Wheeling architect Frank Faris served as the local project superintendent.

The building has been expanded and altered several times. In 1937, as Wheeling required increased services, architect George W. Petticord designed an addition that complemented the original building's Beaux Arts character. Completed in 1938, this expansion accommodated a new post office and district courtroom. Petticord, a Wheeling native, also completed plans for a dramatic interior renovation that replaced many original finishes. In 1999, a small wing was added to the rear of the building to create more secure holding and circulation areas for detainees. Most recently, HLM Design with Goody, Clancy & Associates, designed a dramatic glass annex. Completed in 2004, it contains federal agency offices and court-related spaces.

== Architecture ==
The courthouse is a stately example of Beaux Arts Classicism architecture, providing downtown Wheeling with an elegant building that conveys the federal government's former dignity. The granite building displays many character-defining features of the Beaux Arts Classicism style, including a symmetrical, monumental facade and paired columns. The first-story stonework is rusticated with incised horizontal bands, contrasting with the smooth blocks of the upper stories. The recessed main entrance is framed by a wide surround, which is in turn encircled by a carved garland. An ornate oval medallion with a garland, acanthus leaves, and a shell motif tops the doorway. Rectangular, first-story windows have flat arches with projecting keystones. A colonnade that features paired Ionic columns with stylized foliated motifs and unusual tassel ornamentation dominates the three central bays of the second and third stories. Small balustrades with urn-shaped members extend between the columns. Large tripartite, multi-pane, double-hung windows are located on the second story between the columns. Spandrels separate the large windows from smaller tripartite windows on the third story. A key motif and centrally placed projecting keystones top the windows. Also on the second story and flanking the colonnade are windows with elaborate semi-circular hoods featuring scrolled brackets supporting oval medallions. Decorative balustrades are located below each window. The columns support a classical entablature that consists of a molded architrave, an incised frieze with an egg-and-dart molding, and a cornice that features a dentil course. A balustrade tops the building.

The interior of the original portion contains the postal lobby. Although modified during the 1930s, the lobby remains a significant interior space. The terrazzo flooring forms a checkerboard pattern. Marble pilasters, baseboards, and wainscot and aluminum doors, grilles, and postal service windows are present. The two-story district courtroom has a low-relief plaster ceiling with a simple border. Walnut is used for the wainscoting, judge's bench, jury box, public benches, and door surrounds.

The 1938 addition, built to accommodate a district courtroom, altered the symmetry of the building. The addition uses materials and architectural details that are compatible with the original building. The first-story granite walls are also rusticated, but the second-story window hoods are less detailed than those of the original building. In 1999, a small addition on the rear of the building was constructed to accommodate holding cells and secure circulation. Construction of an 86,900-square-foot (8,070 m^{2}) annex to house new courtrooms began in 2002 and was completed in 2004 under GSA's Design Excellence Program. The entrance incorporates a striking glass-curtain wall with twenty-five images of the Great Seal of the United States screened on five-by-five foot glass panels. The remaining exterior walls are constructed of limestone and brick and rest on a granite base.

A four-story atrium links the annex with historic portions of the building. The granite wall of the 1938 addition is preserved inside the sun-lit lobby. The limestone flooring is embedded with fossils. Integrated into this space is a sculpture called River of Light by Mikyoung Kim. The artwork features layers of glass implanted with fiber optic rods that slowly change color. The sculpture evokes both the movement of the Ohio River and Wheeling's industrial heritage as a glass-making center. Kim's work received a 2004 Design Excellence Citation for Art in Architecture from the U.S. General Services Administration. View from Suspension Bridge, a painting by West Virginia artist Susan Poffenbarger located adjacent to the second-floor elevators, depicts the Ohio River as seen from the suspension bridge.

The new second-floor district courtroom overlooks the atrium lobby and contains dark cherry paneling and metal light fixtures. Other spaces include a bankruptcy courtroom, magistrate courtroom, jury assembly room, and offices. The project won Buildings magazine's new construction award in 2004.

== Significant events ==
- 1859 Original U.S. Custom House constructed
- 1905-1907 Building constructed
- 1938 First addition completed
- 1999 Rear extension added
- 2004 Award-winning annex completed

== Building facts ==
- Location: 1125 Chapline Street
- Architects: Marsh & Peter with Frank Faris; George W. Petticord; HLM Design with Goody, Clancy & Associates
- Construction dates: 1905-1907; 1937–1938; 2002–2004
- Architectural style: Beaux-Arts Classicism
