= W. Craig Broadwater =

American judge (1950–2006)

Willard Craig Broadwater

Judge of the United States District Court for the Northern District of West Virginia
- In office July 26, 1996 – December 18, 2006
- Appointed by: Bill Clinton
- Preceded by: Robert Earl Maxwell
- Succeeded by: Gina M. Groh

Personal details
- Born: Willard Craig Broadwater; August 8, 1950 Elk City, Oklahoma
- Died: December 18, 2006 (aged 56) Pittsburgh, Pennsylvania
- Education: West Virginia University (BA); West Virginia University College of Law (JD)

Willard Craig Broadwater (August 8, 1950 – December 18, 2006) was a U.S. federal judge of the U.S. District Court for the Northern District of West Virginia.

== Education and career ==
Born in Elk City, Oklahoma, Broadwater graduated from Paden City High School in West Virginia and received a Bachelor of Arts degree from West Virginia University in 1972 and a Juris Doctor from West Virginia University College of Law in 1977. He was also a Lieutenant in the United States Army from 1972 to 1982. He was in private practice in Wheeling, West Virginia from 1977 to 1983. He was a Hearing examiner for the West Virginia Worker's Compensation Fund from 1978 to 1981. He was a Special prosecuting attorney of Ohio County, West Virginia from 1982 to 1983, and then became a circuit court judge for the First Judicial Circuit of West Virginia, from 1983 to 1996.

== Military career ==
Among his many assignments, General Broadwater volunteered for duty in Iraq where he commanded the Joint Interagency Task Force for High Value Individuals (JIATF-HVI) from mid 2005 to early 2006. At his death, he was a Brigadier General in the West Virginia National Guard.

== Federal judicial service ==
On January 26, 1996, Broadwater was nominated by President Bill Clinton to a seat on the U.S. District Court for the Northern District of West Virginia vacated by Robert Earl Maxwell. Broadwater was confirmed by the United States Senate on July 12, 1996, and received his commission on July 26, 1996. Broadwater served in that capacity until his death, in 2006, in Pittsburgh, Pennsylvania.

== Death ==
Broadwater died on December 18, 2006, at the University of Pittsburgh Medical Center of complications of cancer.

== Notes ==
Legal offices
Preceded by Robert Earl Maxwell	Judge of the United States District Court for the Northern District of West Virginia; 1996–2006	Succeeded by Gina M. Groh
