= Watson, West Virginia =

Watson
- Unincorporated community
- Location within the state of West Virginia Watson (the United States)
- Coordinates: 39°27′49″N 80°9′36″W
- Country: United States
- State: West Virginia
- County: Marion
- Elevation: 965 ft (294 m)
- Time zone: UTC-5 (Eastern (EST))
  - Summer (DST): UTC-4 (EDT)
- GNIS ID: 1555927

Watson is an unincorporated community in Marion County, West Virginia, United States. Its post office is closed.

The community was named after Joseph Watson, the original owner of the town site.
