= Sinks Grove, West Virginia =

- Unincorporated community
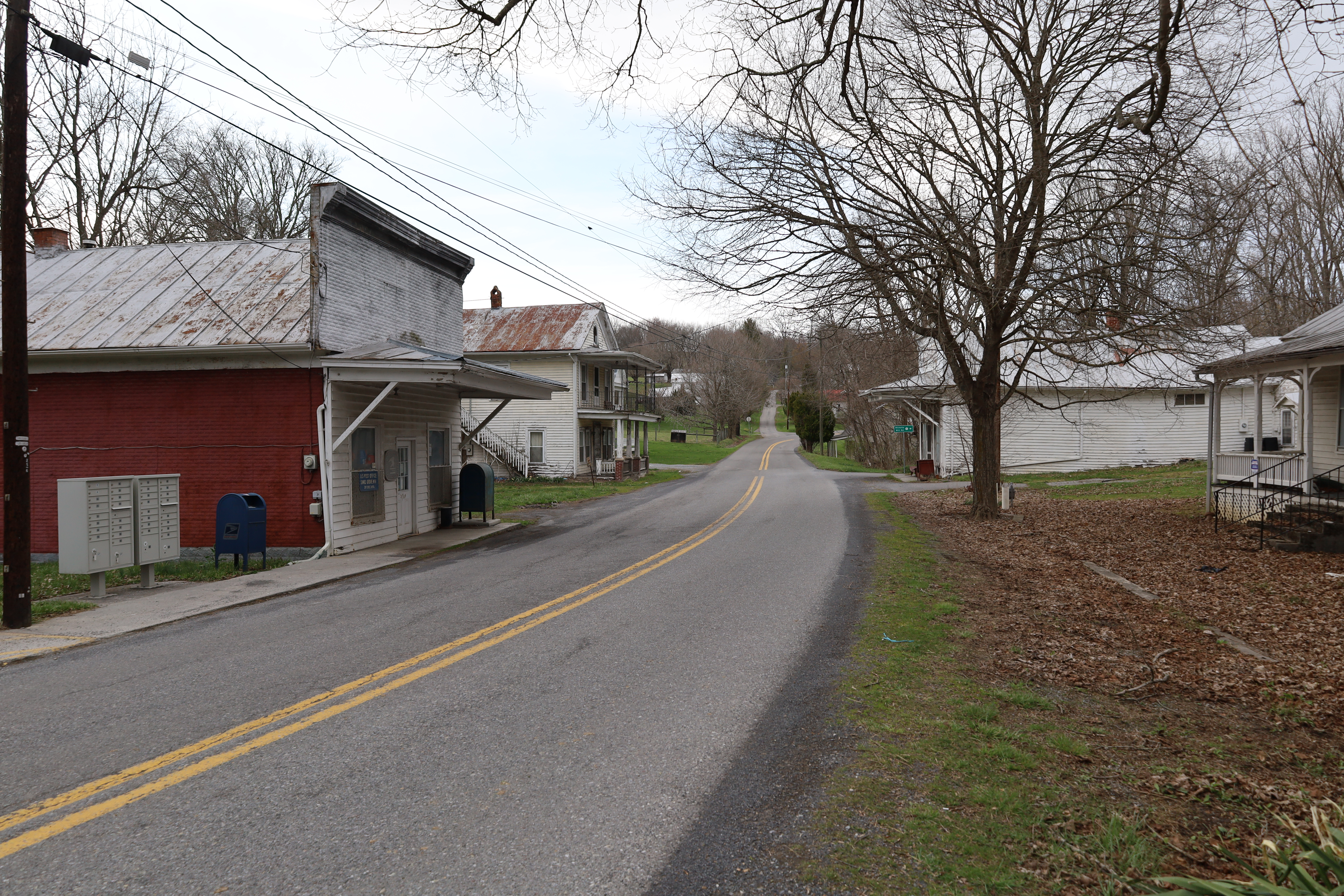
- Sinks Grove in 2022, with the post office building at left

- Location within West Virginia Location within the United States
- Coordinates: 37°39′51″N 80°32′27″W
- Country: United States
- State: West Virginia
- County: Monroe
- Elevation: 2,198 ft (670 m)
- Time zone: UTC-5 (Eastern (EST))
  - Summer (DST): UTC-4 (EDT)
- ZIP code: 24976
- Area codes: 304 & 681
- GNIS feature ID: 1546836

Sinks Grove is an unincorporated community in Monroe County, West Virginia, United States. Sinks Grove is located on West Virginia Route 3, north of Union. Sinks Grove has a post office with ZIP code 24976.

The "sinks" in Sinks Grove refers to the many dolines or sinkholes throughout the community. Monroe County was once called "The Land of Sinks" for this effect of its heavily karstic geology.

Sinks Grove is part of the Second Creek watershed, draining into the Greenbrier River and then into the New River.
