= Robert Earl Maxwell =

American judge (1924–2010)

Senior Judge of the United States District Court for the Northern District of West Virginia
- In office July 19, 1995 – November 20, 2010

Chief Judge of the United States District Court for the Northern District of West Virginia
- In office 1965–1994
- Preceded by: Charles Ferguson Paul
- Succeeded by: Frederick Pfarr Stamp Jr.

Judge of the United States District Court for the Northern District of West Virginia
- In office August 11, 1965 – July 19, 1995
- Appointed by: Lyndon B. Johnson
- Preceded by: Charles Ferguson Paul
- Succeeded by: W. Craig Broadwater

Personal details
- Born: Robert Earl Maxwell; March 15, 1924 South Bend, Indiana
- Died: November 20, 2010 (aged 86) Elkins, West Virginia
- Education: West Virginia University College of Law (LL.B.)

Robert Earl Maxwell (March 15, 1924 – November 20, 2010) was a United States district judge of the United States District Court for the Northern District of West Virginia.

== Education and career ==
Born in South Bend, Indiana, Maxwell received a Bachelor of Laws from West Virginia University College of Law in 1949. He was in private practice in Randolph County, West Virginia in 1949. He was prosecuting attorney of Elkins, West Virginia from 1953 to 1961. He was the United States Attorney for the Northern District of West Virginia from 1961 to 1964.

== Federal judicial service ==
On July 19, 1965, Maxwell was nominated by President Lyndon B. Johnson to a seat on the United States District Court for the Northern District of West Virginia vacated by Judge Charles Ferguson Paul. Maxwell was confirmed by the United States Senate on August 11, 1965, and received his commission the same day. He served as Chief Judge from 1965 to 1994, and assumed senior status on July 19, 1995. His service terminated on November 20, 2010, due to his death in Elkins.

== See also ==
- List of United States federal judges by longevity of service

== Sources ==
Legal offices
Preceded by Charles Ferguson Paul	Judge of the United States District Court for the Northern District of West Virginia; 1965–1995	Succeeded by W. Craig Broadwater
Preceded by Charles Ferguson Paul	Chief Judge of the United States District Court for the Northern District of West Virginia; 1965–1994	Succeeded by Frederick Pfarr Stamp Jr.
