= West Virginia Independence Hall =

Building in Wheeling, West Virginia

- U.S. National Register of Historic Places
- U.S. National Historic Landmark

- Location within West Virginia Location within the United States
- Location: 1528 Market St., Wheeling, West Virginia
- Coordinates: 40°3′51″N 80°43′18″W
- Built: 1859
- Architect: Ammi B. Young; Alfred B. Mullett
- Architectural style: Renaissance
- NRHP reference No.: 70000660

Significant dates
- Added to NRHP: January 26, 1970
- Designated NHL: June 20, 1988

West Virginia Independence Hall is a historic government building at 1528 Market Street in downtown Wheeling, West Virginia, United States. It was built in 1860 under the supervision of architect Ammi B. Young for the federal government as a custom house, post office and courthouse. It is architecturally significant for its innovative uses of wrought iron as a framing material, and is historically significant for its role in the American Civil War. It housed the Wheeling Convention (1861), as well as the West Virginia Constitutional Convention (1863), which resulted in the separation of Unionist West Virginia from Confederate Virginia. This made it the only state to secede from a Confederate state during the war. The building was originally built as the custom house for the Western District of Virginia, and later became the center of government for the Restored Government of Virginia from 1861 to 1863, with Francis H. Pierpont serving as its governor. It was declared a National Historic Landmark in 1988. The building is now a state-run museum, housing exhibits on West Virginia history.

== Architecture ==
West Virginia Independence Hall is located in downtown Wheeling, at the northeast corner of Market and 16th Streets, near the confluence of Wheeling Creek and the Ohio River. It is a three-story masonry structure, with an exterior of load-bearing ashlar-cut sandstone blocks. Stylistically it is an early example of Renaissance Revival architecture, with round-arch window and door openings, including an arcaded set of arches at the entrance. The ground-floor coursing has deep rusticated joints, and there are projecting beltcourses between the floors. At the roof line, there is a projecting cornice with dentil moulding and modillion blocks.

The interior of the building repeats some of the features of the exterior, notably the use of round-arch openings for doorways. The inside has a wrought iron framing system, built using rolled I-beams fabricated by the Trenton Iron Works. This usage represents one of the first uses of rolled I-beams in building construction, and the frame as a whole is one of the best-preserved early examples of wrought iron framing.

The building has gone a number of alterations since its construction, many of which have subsequently been reversed to bring the building close to the original vision of the architect, Ammi B. Young. Young's design had a low-pitch roof that was found inadequate for proper drainage, and was steepened in the late 1860s to a design by Alfred B. Mullett. The roof was raised when a fourth floor was added in the 20th century; the fourth floor was removed during restoration, but Mullett's roofline was retained.

== History ==
The building was constructed by the federal government in 1859 to serve a number of functions. Due to its location on the Ohio River, Wheeling was designated an inland port in the 1850s, and thus needed a custom house. This building was erected to house that federal government function, as well as a federal court and the post office. As a courthouse, it housed the United States District Court for the Western District of Virginia from 1860 to 1864, then the District of West Virginia from 1864 to 1901, and finally the Northern District of West Virginia from 1901 to 1907.

When the American Civil War broke out in 1861, a significant portion of northwestern Virginia opposed that state's secession from the Union. Although the state moved quickly to seize federal facilities in other parts of the state, the Wheeling custom house was not taken over, and was then used as a center of opposition. The Wheeling Convention of May 1861, held in this building, included the first calls for the separation of that portion of the state, whose economy was intertwined with that of neighboring Union states. A second, smaller convention, held here in June 1861, established the Restored Government of Virginia, which was recognized by the United States as the official government of the state during the war. That government sat here until 1863, when it moved to Alexandria. The constitutional convention which drafted the first West Virginia constitution was also held here, and it was used as a military arsenal by the West Virginia militia.

In 1907, the federal government constructed a new federal building at 12th and Chapline, and sold this building. Most of it was occupied by the Conservative Life Insurance Company, which made a three-story addition, and was responsible for adding the fourth floor. In 1963, marking the state centennial, it purchased the building, and in 1969 appropriated funds to restore the building to its Civil War appearance.

== See also ==
- List of historic sites in Ohio County, West Virginia
- National Register of Historic Places in Ohio County, West Virginia
- List of National Historic Landmarks in West Virginia
