= United States District Court for the Northern District of West Virginia =

United States federal district court in West Virginia

Coordinates: 39°27′22.7″N 77°57′58.2″W

- (N.D. W. Va.)
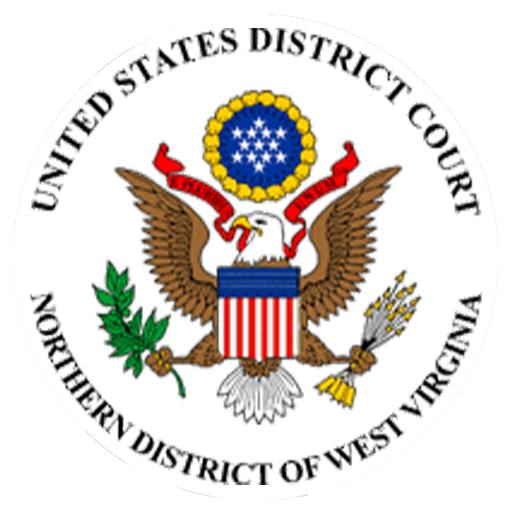
- Location: Martinsburg More locations: Federal Building and United States Courthouse (Wheeling); Elkins; Clarksburg
- Appeals to: Fourth Circuit
- Established: January 22, 1901
- Judges: 3
- Chief Judge: Tom Kleeh

Officers of the court
- U.S. Attorney: Matthew L. Harvey
- U.S. Marshal: Terry Moore (acting)
- www.wvnd.uscourts.gov

The United States District Court for the Northern District of West Virginia (in case citations, N.D. W. Va.) is a federal court in the Fourth Circuit (except for patent claims and claims against the U.S. government under the Tucker Act, which are appealed to the Federal Circuit).

The District was established on June 22, 1901.

As of October 20, 2025 the United States attorney is Matthew L. Harvey.

== Organization of the court ==
The Northern District embraces the counties colored green on this map.

The United States District Court for the Northern District of West Virginia is one of two federal judicial districts in West Virginia (the other being the Southern District). Court for the Northern District is held at Clarksburg, Elkins, Martinsburg, and Wheeling.

Clarksburg Division comprises the following counties: Braxton, Calhoun, Doddridge, Gilmer, Harrison, Marion, Monongalia, Pleasants, Preston, Ritchie, and Taylor.

Elkins Division comprises the following counties: Barbour, Grant, Hardy, Lewis, Pendleton, Pocahontas, Randolph, Tucker, Upshur, and Webster.

Martinsburg Division comprises the following counties: Berkeley, Hampshire, Jefferson, Mineral, and Morgan.

Wheeling Division comprises the following counties: Brooke, Hancock, Marshall, Ohio, Tyler, and Wetzel.

== Current judges ==
As of March 19, 2022:

#	Title	Judge	Duty station	Born	Term of service			Appointed by
#	Title	Judge	Duty station	Born	Active	Chief	Senior	Appointed by
16	Chief Judge	Tom Kleeh	Clarksburg; Elkins	1974	2018–present	2022–present	—	Trump
14	District Judge	John P. Bailey	Wheeling	1951	2007–present	2008–2015	—	G.W. Bush
15	District Judge	Gina M. Groh	Martinsburg	1964	2012–present	2015–2022	—	Obama
11	Senior Judge	Frederick Stamp Jr.	inactive	1934	1990–2006	1994–2001	2006–present	G.H.W. Bush
12	Senior Judge	Irene Keeley	inactive	1944	1992–2017	2001–2008	2017–present	G.H.W. Bush

== Former judges ==
#	Judge	Born–died	Active service	Chief Judge	Senior status	Appointed by	Reason for termination
1	John Jay Jackson Jr.	1824–1907	1901–1905 (Note: Early in the course of the American Civil War, the western portion of Virginia rejected Virginia's secession from the United States, and itself seceded from Virginia. This area largely coincided with the existing Western District of Virginia. The portion of Virginia remaining loyal to the Union became the state of West Virginia, which was admitted as a state on June 20, 1863. On June 11, 1864, by 13 Stat. 124, the United States District Court for the Western District of Virginia became the United States District Court for the District of West Virginia, and those parts of the Western District that were not part of West Virginia were combined with what had previously been the United States District Court for the Eastern District of Virginia to again form a single United States District Court for the District of Virginia. John Jay Jackson, who had been appointed to the Western District of Virginia, was reassigned by operation of law to the newly formed District of West Virginia. At the same time, John Curtiss Underwood, who had been appointed to the Eastern District of Virginia, was reassigned by operation of law to the newly formed District of Virginia. On February 3, 1871, the District of Virginia was again subdivided into Eastern and Western Districts, and Underwood was reassigned to the Eastern District, until his death. On July 1, 1901, the District of West Virginia was subdivided into the United States District Court for the Northern District of West Virginia and the United States District Court for the Southern District of West Virginia; Jackson was reassigned to the Northern District, until his retirement.)	—	—	Lincoln/Operation of law	retirement
2	Alston G. Dayton	1857–1920	1905–1920	—	—	T. Roosevelt	death
3	William E. Baker	1873–1954	1921–1954	1948–1954	1954	Harding	death
4	Harry Evans Watkins	1898–1963	1937–1963 (Note: Jointly appointed to the Northern and Southern Districts of West Virginia)	1954–1963	—	F. Roosevelt	death
5	Herbert Boreman	1897–1982	1954–1959	—	—	Eisenhower	elevation
6	Charles Ferguson Paul	1902–1965	1960–1965	1963–1965	—	Eisenhower	death
7	Sidney Lee Christie	1903–1974	1964–1974	—	—	L. Johnson	death
8	Robert Earl Maxwell	1924–2010	1965–1995	1965–1994	1995–2010	L. Johnson	death
9	Charles Harold Haden II	1937–2004	1975–1983	—	—	Ford	reassignment
10	William Matthew Kidd	1918–1998	1983–1990 (Note: Reassigned from the Southern District of West Virginia.)	—	1990–1998	Carter/Operation of law	death
13	W. Craig Broadwater	1950–2006	1996–2006	—	—	Clinton	death

== Chief judges ==
Chief judges have administrative responsibilities with respect to their district court. Unlike the Supreme Court, where one justice is specifically nominated to be chief, the office of chief judge rotates among the district court judges. To be chief, a judge must have been in active service on the court for at least one year, be under the age of 65, and have not previously served as chief judge.

A vacancy is filled by the judge highest in seniority among the group of qualified judges. The chief judge serves for a term of seven years, or until age 70, whichever occurs first. The age restrictions are waived if no members of the court would otherwise be qualified for the position.

When the office was created in 1948, the chief judge was the longest-serving judge who had not elected to retire, on what has since 1958 been known as senior status, or declined to serve as chief judge. After August 6, 1959, judges could not become or remain chief after turning 70 years old. The current rules have been in operation since October 1, 1982.

== Succession of seats ==
Seat 1
Seat reassigned from the District of West Virginia on January 22, 1901 by 31 Stat. 736
Jackson, Jr.	1901–1905
Dayton	1905–1920
Baker	1921–1954
Boreman	1954–1959
Paul	1960–1965
Maxwell	1965–1995
Broadwater	1996–2006
Groh	2012–present

Seat 2
Seat established on June 22, 1936 by 49 Stat. 1805 (temporary, concurrent with Southern District)
Seat made permanent on February 10, 1954 by 68 Stat. 8
Watkins	1937–1963
Christie	1964–1974
Haden II	1975–1983
Seat statutorily assigned solely to the Southern District on January 14, 1983

Seat 3
Seat reassigned from the Southern District on January 14, 1983 by 96 Stat. 2601
Kidd	1983–1990
Stamp, Jr.	1990–2006
Bailey	2007–present

Seat 4
Seat established on December 1, 1990 by 104 Stat. 5089
Keeley	1992–2017
Kleeh	2018–present

== See also ==
- Courts of West Virginia
- List of current United States district judges
- List of United States federal courthouses in West Virginia
- United States District Court for the Southern District of West Virginia
