= Okey Patteson =

American politician (1898–1989)

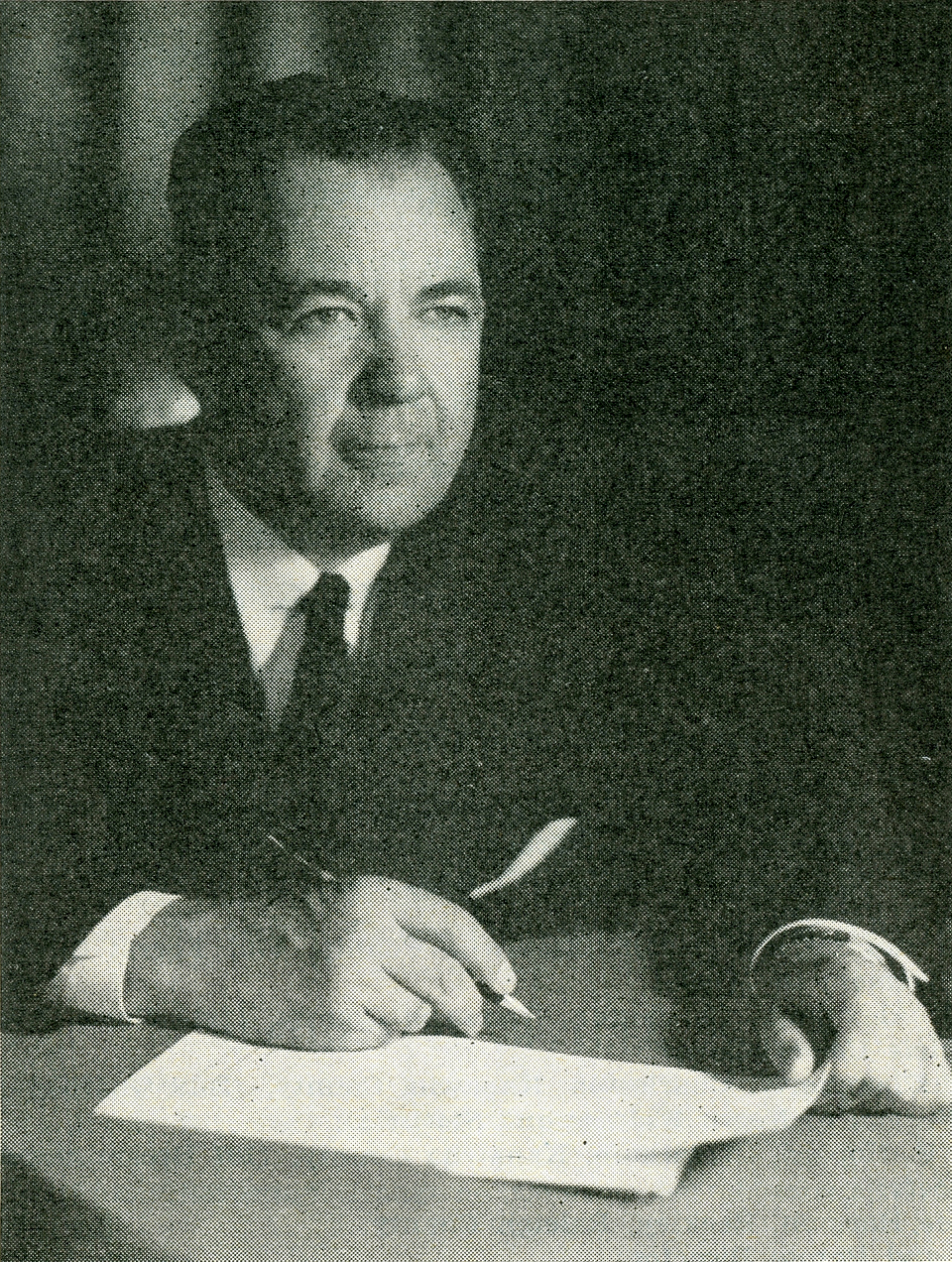

23rd Governor of West Virginia
- In office January 17, 1949 – January 19, 1953
- Preceded by: Clarence W. Meadows
- Succeeded by: William C. Marland

Personal details
- Born: September 14, 1898 Dingess, West Virginia, U.S.
- Died: July 3, 1989 (aged 90) Beckley, West Virginia, U.S.
- Resting place: High Lawn Memorial Park; Oak Hill, West Virginia
- Party: Democratic
- Spouse: Lee Hawse Patteson
- Children: 2
- Profession: Politician

Military service
- Allegiance: United States
- Branch/service: United States Army
- Rank: First Sergeant
- Unit: West Virginia National Guard

Okey Leonidas Patteson (September 14, 1898 – July 3, 1989) was the 23rd governor of West Virginia from 1949 to 1953. He was a member of the Democratic Party and of the "machine" that totally controlled politics in that era in the state.

== Biography ==
Okey Patteson was son of L.C. and Lola (Groves) Patteson. He was born at Dingess, West Virginia and raised at Mount Hope, Fayette County. He married Lee Hawse in 1923 and they had two daughters, Fanny Lee and Anna Hughes. His religious affiliation was Methodist. In 1932, a hunting accident left him disabled, as both of his legs had to be amputated below the knees.

Patteson graduated with a bachelor's degree from West Virginia Wesleyan College and did post-graduate work at Carnegie Institute of Technology. He was awarded honorary degrees of L.L.D. from West Virginia University in 1949 and from West Virginia Wesleyan College.

Patteson worked as an automobile dealer and with real estate in Mount Hope. He served as President of Fayette County Court 1935–1941 and as sheriff of Fayette County 1941–1944. In the 1944 elections, he was Campaign manager for the Democratic Party and became a Presidential elector. The new governor, Clarence W. Meadows, appointed him his personal assistant, a position he held for three years, until he resigned to run for governor, January 1, 1948. He won the nomination with a margin of 62,000 over the nearest opponent and was elected by majority of 110,000 in the general election. He served as governor for one term.

Patteson was a member of the Board of Trustees of West Virginia Wesleyan College, and of a number of societies: Free masons, Knights Templar, Moose International, Lions, Chamber of Commerce, American Legion, Sons of the American Revolution and Elks. He was a member of the National Guard for three years.

After his term Patteson served as general manager of the Turnpike, returned to real estate business, and became president of the Raleigh County Bank. In 1969, Governor Arch A. Moore, Jr. named Patteson to the newly created Board of Regents.

== Governorship ==
He is best known for his decision to place the state's first medical school at West Virginia University in Morgantown, in the northern part of the state, rather than in the more centrally located Charleston. A section of West Virginia Route 705 leading to West Virginia University Hospitals is named Patteson Drive in his honor.

He also is known for the initial construction of the West Virginia Turnpike, which was to be a 4-lane road system throughout the state, although, after his term, it was superseded by the interstate highway system, with only a 2-lane section between Charleston and Princeton ever completed.

During his governorship, Patteson, in a now-infamous decision, closed the state investigation into the disappearance of the Sodder children, calling the children's parents' pursuit of the case "hopeless".

During his term, the legislature created the position of state Tax Commissioner and authorized cities to levy sales taxes.

He was praised by crime writer Erle Stanley Gardner for his careful re-investigation of the case of convicted murderer Robert Ballard Bailey when doubts were raised about the validity of the conviction. Gardner dedicated his detective novel Top of the Heap to Patteson.

Party political offices
Preceded by Clarence W. Meadows	Democratic nominee for Governor of West Virginia; 1948	Succeeded by William C. Marland
Political offices
Preceded by Clarence W. Meadows	Governor of West Virginia; 1949–1953	Succeeded by William C. Marland
