= Deportation of Kilmar Abrego Garcia =

2025 US extrajudicial deportation

- Part of deportation in the second presidency of Donald Trump
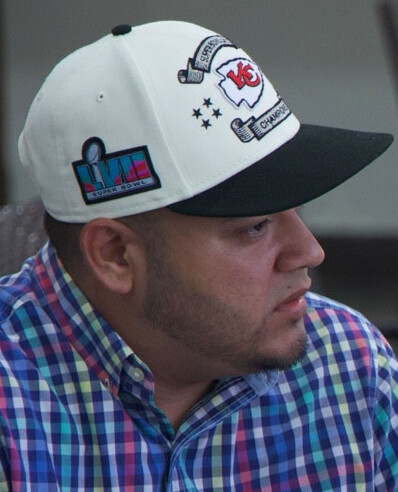
- Abrego Garcia during his April 17, 2025, meeting while in Salvadoran custody
- Date: March 15–16, 2025
- Perpetrators: Governments of the United States and El Salvador
- Arrests: Kilmar Abrego Garcia

Kilmar Armando Ábrego García, (Note: Spanish pronunciation: [ˈkilmaɾ aɾˈmando ˈaβɾeɣo ɡaɾˈsia].) (Note: His name has been variously reported as Kilmar Armando Abrego Garcia, Kilmar Armado Ábrego García, Kilmer Armado Abrego-Garcia, and Kilmar Armado Abrego Garcia. In a Supreme Court ruling, the name used is Kilmar Armando Abrego Garcia.) a Salvadoran man living in the United States, was illegally deported on March 15, 2025, by the U.S. government under the Trump administration, which called it "an administrative error". His case became the most prominent of the hundreds of migrants the U.S. sent to be jailed without trial at the Salvadoran Terrorism Confinement Center (CECOT) under the countries' agreement where the U.S. would pay the Salvadoran government to imprison U.S. deportees there. The administration defended the deportation and accused Abrego Garcia of being a member of MS-13—a US-designated terrorist organization—based on a county police report mentioned during a 2019 immigration court bail proceeding. Abrego Garcia has denied the allegation.

Abrego Garcia grew up in El Salvador, and around 2011, at age 16, he illegally immigrated to the United States to escape gang threats. In 2019, an immigration judge granted him withholding of removal status due to the danger he would face from gang violence if he returned to El Salvador. This status allowed him to live and work legally in the U.S. At the time of his deportation in 2025, he lived in Maryland with his wife and children, who are all American citizens; he was complying with annual US Immigration and Customs Enforcement (ICE) check-ins; and he had never been charged with or convicted of a crime in either country. Despite this, he was imprisoned without trial in CECOT.

After Abrego Garcia was deported, his wife filed suit in Maryland asking that the U.S. government return him to the U.S. The district court judge ordered the government to "facilitate and effectuate" his return. The government appealed, and on April 10, 2025, the Supreme Court stated unanimously (Note: Unsigned orders do not specify a vote count; however, there were no public dissents.) that the government must "facilitate" Abrego Garcia's return to the U.S. The administration interpreted "facilitate" to mean it was not obligated to seek his release, and it was up to El Salvador whether to release him.

On June 6, 2025, the federal government returned Abrego Garcia to the U.S., and the Department of Justice announced that he had been criminally indicted in Tennessee for "unlawful transportation of illegal aliens for financial gain" and conspiracy to do so. A federal judge ruled that he would temporarily remain in prison in Tennessee to protect him from deportation, but after further orders from Maryland and Tennessee courts prohibited his immediate deportation, he was released on bail in August and returned to Maryland. ICE officials detained him a few days later, saying they intended to deport him to a third country. He was released again on December 11 upon a federal judge's order, and the judge dismissed the criminal case against him in May 2026. In August 2026, the Justice Department appealed the dismissal.

== Background ==
=== Kilmar Abrego Garcia ===
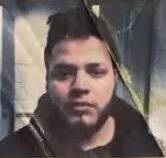
Abrego Garcia, pictured in an Immigration and Customs Enforcement document dated 2019

Kilmar Abrego Garcia was born in the Los Nogales neighborhood of San Salvador, El Salvador, in July 1995. In El Salvador, the Barrio 18 criminal gang extorted his mother's pupusa (a street food) business for money and threatened that if she did not pay the money, they would force her eldest son, Cesar, to join the gang; the gang later threatened to kill him. As a result, the family paid the money and hid Cesar, eventually sending him to the United States. Barrio 18 then turned its attention to Kilmar, who was around 12 years old. The gang followed Kilmar and continued to threaten his family. Eventually, when Kilmar was 16 years old, his family sent him to the U.S. as well. Court documents indicate that around 2011 or 2012, (Note: Some news sources report that Abrego Garcia entered in 2011. Some news sources report that he entered in 2012. Some news sources report that he entered in either 2011 or 2012.) he illegally crossed the Mexico–US border near McAllen, Texas. In other court documents, the government stated that he entered the U.S. "at or near an unknown place on or about an unknown date".

From the U.S. border, Abrego Garcia traveled to Maryland in order to live with his brother Cesar, who became a US citizen. In 2016, Abrego Garcia met Jennifer Vasquez Sura, a US citizen, and they later married. After marrying, the couple had one child, whom they raised alongside Vasquez Sura's two children from an earlier relationship. All three children have special needs; the son born to the couple has autism and a hearing defect, and is "unable to communicate verbally". Abrego Garcia lived in Maryland with his family, and at the time of his deportation had not been charged with or convicted of any criminal offense, including gang membership, in the U.S. or El Salvador.

==== 2019 detention and bond hearings ====
In March 2019, Abrego Garcia and three other men were stopped for loitering in Hyattsville, Maryland, in the parking lot of a Home Depot store where his lawyers say they were seeking work as day laborers. A Hyattsville Police Department (HPD) incident report, which names the other men but not Abrego Garcia, said that an officer "approached them because he saw members of the group 'stashing something underneath a car'". The HPD incident report does not mention any suspicion of gang membership, but Ivan Mendez, a detective with the Prince George's County Police Department (PGPD) gang unit, said that the HPD officer contacted the gang unit because the officer recognized another of the men as a member of the MS-13 Sailors clique. MS-13, a rival of Barrio 18, began in immigrant communities in Los Angeles and has ties to several Central and South American countries. The Department of Justice (DOJ) has described MS-13 cliques as "smaller groups operating in a specific city or region". Several PGPD detectives with the gang unit interviewed the four men, and said they "had reasonable suspicion, based upon their training and experience", that Abrego Garcia and two of the other men "displayed traits associated with MS-13 gang culture", for which police cited tattoos, clothing, and "information from a source". None of the men were charged with any crime, and Abrego Garcia denied any connection to MS-13.

Mendez was suspended from the PGPD in April 2019 for misconduct unrelated to the incident with Abrego Garcia. In 2021, the local prosecutor's office included Mendez in a "do not call" list of officers judged to be unreliable, and he was terminated in December 2022 after pleading guilty to misconduct and accepting the department's proposal of his termination.

The PGPD transferred custody of Abrego Garcia to US Immigration and Customs Enforcement (ICE) to initiate deportation proceedings, and the police department later said that it had no further interactions with him after the 2019 stop. The PGPD and ICE paperwork for Abrego Garcia included some inconsistencies, with the PGPD stating that he was picked up for loitering, and ICE stating that he was picked up in connection with a murder investigation. In addition, the ICE paperwork stated both that "Abrego-Garcia is not claiming fear of returning to his country" and that "Abrego-Garcia is claiming fear of returning to his home country of El Salvador." The government did not subsequently allege any connection to a murder investigation.

In the legal proceedings, the U.S. government stated Abrego Garcia was a member of MS-13 because "he was wearing a Chicago Bulls hat and a hoodie with rolls of money covering the eyes, ears and mouth of the presidents on the separate denominations" when arrested, and alleged that such clothes are "indicative of the Hispanic gang culture". MS-13 had previously adopted the Chicago Bulls logo as a gang symbol. Vasquez Sura later said that the sweatshirt was a gift from her to Abrego Garcia, bought from Fashion Nova "because she liked the design", and The New York Times described that design as having images of "rolls of money and the face of Benjamin Franklin – not presidents, as the police report said". The Washington Post said the images were "Franklin's face as printed on the $100 bill" with "green bands covering the eyes, ears and mouth".

Officials also said they spoke to a "past and proven reliable confidential source" who told them that Abrego Garcia was an active gang member with the moniker "Chele". The government said the informant alleged that Abrego Garcia was active with MS-13's Western clique, which, according to his immigration lawyer, Simon Sandoval-Moshenberg, is based in New York, where Abrego Garcia has never lived. Sandoval-Moshenberg cited the DOJ and the Suffolk County district attorney's office regarding the Western clique's location. However, Mia Cathell of the Washington Examiner noted that Prince George's County, where Abrego Garcia lived, is in the greater Washington, D.C. area, and she cited an unrelated 2011 DOJ indictment that said six MS-13 cliques operated in that area in 2011, including the Western clique. The informant also said Abrego Garcia held the MS-13 rank of chequeo; according to MS-13 author Steven Dudley, chequeo is not a rank within MS-13 but refers to yet-to-be-initiated recruits.

Abrego Garcia requested a bond hearing, which the American Bar Association describes as "typically informal affairs, not substitutes for trial or even for discovery. Often the opposing parties simply describe to the judicial officer the nature of their evidence; they do not actually produce it." Elizabeth Kessler, the immigration judge who presided over the bond hearing, noted that some information provided by ICE and the PGPD appeared to be "at odds with" each other, but determined the informant's claim was sufficient evidence in support of his gang membership to deny Abrego Garcia's request for bond, and to hold him pending a full review. On appeal, a second judge upheld that ruling, finding that the claim was not clearly wrong. As a bond hearing decision, this was not a determination that he was a gang member, but instead limited to whether to release him from custody.

Vasquez Sura said the government had "absolutely no evidence" and "Kilmar is not and has never been a gang member". Abrego Garcia had never been charged with a crime, and The Washington Post reported that no court ever made a "full adjudication" of whether he was indeed a gang member.

In Abrego Garcia's hearing, neither the PGPD officers nor the confidential informant were cross-examined. Standards of evidence in US immigration hearings are lower than in trials: the government's claims are assumed to be true, while the burden of proof rests with the defendant. Additionally, "Record of Deportable/Inadmissible Alien" forms—which consist largely of hearsay and are thus inadmissible in other proceedings—are admissible in immigration courts and are considered "inherently trustworthy".

==== Withholding of removal status ====
Abrego Garcia applied for asylum after his request for bail was refused, saying he feared returning to El Salvador due to threats of persecution and torture. Immigration judge David M. Jones denied his request for asylum, as asylum applications must be submitted within one year of one's arrival in the United States. Abrego Garcia had also applied for "withholding of removal" status. This request was granted by the judge, who noted that removability had been conceded, but barred deportation to El Salvador, saying that Abrego Garcia faced a "clear probability of future persecution" in the country, and he "demonstrated that [El Salvador's] (Note: The Hill reported that "the immigration judge's order granted Abrego Garcia protection against removal, but referred a number of times to 'Guatemala' rather than El Salvador for reasons that are unclear." The government does not dispute that the withholding of removal order was for El Salvador, stating in one court document that "ICE was aware of his protection from removal to El Salvador".) authorities were and would be unable or unwilling to protect him." The judge wrote that Abrego Garcia provided "substantial documentation" in favor of his claims and that his testimony was "internally consistent, externally consistent", and "appeared free of embellishment".

Withholding of removal is "similar to asylum" but requires a higher burden of proof, and does not preclude potential deportation to a third country not covered by the status. Unless that occurs, those granted withholding of removal are allowed to live and work lawfully in the U.S. Immigrants are ineligible for withholding of removal if they have been convicted of aggravated felonies, are suspected to have committed a serious crime prior to their arrival in the U.S., or are judged to present a security risk to the U.S. Unlike asylum, recipients cannot become eligible for a green card and permanent residency to gain a path to citizenship.

ICE did not appeal the judge's ruling, and released Abrego Garcia from custody. The US Department of Homeland Security granted him a work permit, and he lived and worked legally in Maryland. He was required to check in with ICE annually, with which he complied. While Abrego Garcia was still detained and awaiting the resolution of his deportation proceedings, he married Jennifer Vasquez Sura in June 2019. The two were separated by glass, and an officer gave them both their wedding rings. Later in 2019, Vasquez Sura gave birth to their son. Abrego Garcia continued working to support his family. He became a sheet metal apprentice in September 2024, and was pursuing his journeyman's license at the time of his deportation.

==== Later legal issues ====
Abrego Garcia faced several allegations of domestic abuse from his wife, none of which resulted in charges being filed. Vasquez Sura said that the abuse started in November 2019, about a month after he was released from ICE detention, and that in addition to abusing her, he was also breaking things in the house out of anger. She filled out paperwork for a protective order, but did not show up in court after Abrego Garcia's family convinced her not to. In 2020, she again applied for a protective order, and a judge granted temporary protection and ordered Abrego Garcia to move out of the house. Vasquez Sura requested that the order be rescinded eight days later, so that Abrego Garcia could attend their son's first birthday party, and she did not show up at the subsequent court hearing. Vasquez Sura sought another protective order in 2021, alleging that Abrego Garcia had physically attacked her on multiple occasions, and once again the application was dismissed when she did not appear for the hearing. In 2025, looking back at the period of alleged abuse, she said that Abrego Garcia "was traumatized" from his seven months in ICE detention, and that they were also dealing with other stressors, including "caring for our children with barely enough to get by". She said that with the help of counseling, "We closed that chapter. We were mature enough to look for help."

On either November 30 or December 1, 2022, at a traffic stop on Interstate 40 in Tennessee, Abrego Garcia and eight others were pulled over by the Tennessee Highway Patrol for speeding and veering out of his lane. A Department of Homeland Security report stated that Abrego Garcia informed the Tennessee Highway Patrol officer that he was driving from Houston, Texas, to St. Louis, Missouri, to Temple Hills, Maryland, to transport people to a construction job, and had been driving for three days at that point. The officer stated suspicion of human trafficking because there was no luggage in the vehicle. The Highway Patrol processed his driver's license and found that it was expired and contained a note to inform federal officers due to Garcia's alleged affiliations with MS-13. The agency contacted ICE, which declined to take Abrego Garcia into custody. No charges were filed against him.

=== Trump administration deportation policy ===
During his 2024 campaign for president of the United States, Donald Trump pledged that if elected, he would enact the largest mass deportation operation in US history against both authorized and unauthorized immigrants in the United States and that he would deport over 10 million people through sweeping immigration raids. After Trump's inauguration, he began an immigration crackdown.

In February, Salvadoran president Nayib Bukele offered the U.S. the use of El Salvador's Terrorism Confinement Center (CECOT), a prison notorious for harsh conditions, to imprison criminal deportees of any nationality, including Americans. After diplomatic negotiations by the Trump administration, El Salvador agreed to imprison deportees from the U.S. at CECOT for US$6 million per year.

==== Invocation of the Alien Enemies Act and deportations to El Salvador ====
Trump signed an executive order in January 2025 designating the transnational gangs Tren de Aragua and MS-13 as foreign terrorist organizations. On March 14, Trump invoked the Alien Enemies Act of 1798, which gives the president wartime authority to summarily arrest and deport citizens of a nation at war with or invading the U.S., and claimed that Tren de Aragua was perpetrating an invasion of the United States. The next day, the Trump administration deported hundreds of Venezuelans and dozens of Salvadorans, flying them to El Salvador to be imprisoned in CECOT. Trump asserted that many of the deported Venezuelans are Tren de Aragua members, and used the Alien Enemies Act to deport them. The Salvadorans and other Venezuelans were sent to CECOT via regular deportation. Trump also asserted that the Salvadorans are MS-13 members. El Salvador's ambassador to the United States, Milena Mayorga, said that Bukele had specifically asked for MS-13 leaders to be included among those deported to El Salvador as "an issue of honor". However, most deportees had no criminal history and were detained based on evidence such as tattoos and clothing that the Trump administration said were proof of gang ties.

The deportees arrived in El Salvador after the judge in J.G.G. v. Trump had issued a temporary restraining order that paused deportations under the Alien Enemies Act and had ordered any such flights stopped or turned around. In response, Bukele wrote on social media: "Oopsie... Too late 😂."

==== Terrorism Confinement Center ====
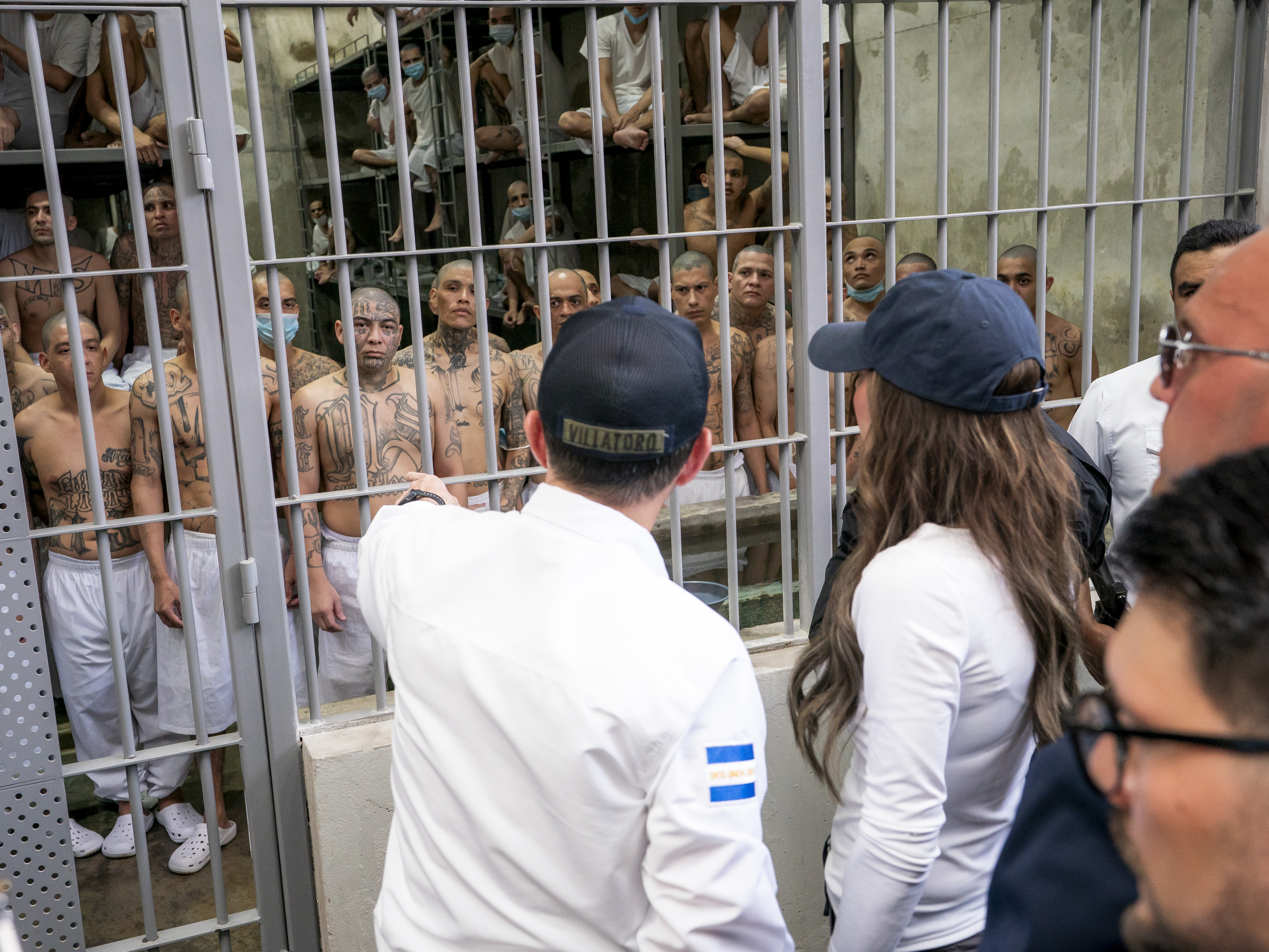
Salvadoran justice minister Gustavo Villatoro (left) and US homeland security secretary Kristi Noem (right) observing inmates inside a cell in CECOT, March 2025

CECOT is a maximum security prison in El Salvador. Prisoners are held in large concrete cells that the Associated Press reports can house 65 to 70 individuals. Some human rights groups claim that the cells sometimes hold as many as 150 inmates, with the prison's director saying "where you can fit 10 people, you can fit 20". The cells are furnished with four-story bunks of bare metal without mattresses or sheets, and lack enough bunks for everyone. Each cell has two toilets, two sinks (reported by CNN as a cement basin and plastic bucket for washing, and a jug of drinking water), and two Bibles. The windowless cells are artificially lit 24 hours a day, and the temperature can reach 35 °C (95 °F) in daytime. Prisoners are allowed to leave their cells for 30 minutes each day for group exercise in the hallway. There are no visits, letters, workshops, or prison educational programs, and prisoners are not allowed outside. Food is served without utensils, to keep them from being fashioned into weapons.

CNN said two sources told it the deportees' situation is less regimented, but with the same facilities. The prison director said of the deportees, "there are no privileges."

Minister of Justice Gustavo Villatoro has said those held at CECOT would never return to their communities. Miguel Sarre, a former member of the United Nations Subcommittee for the Prevention of Torture, said CECOT appeared to be used "to dispose of people without formally applying the death penalty". Cristosal, which the BBC described as El Salvador's primary human rights organization, has documented torture and more than 150 deaths in custody in the country during the ongoing state of exception. Amnesty International has accused Salvadoran authorities of "a systematic policy of torture towards all those detained under the state of emergency on suspicion of being gang members," leading to deaths in custody, and of other prisoners dying due to inhumane conditions and denial of medical care and medicine.

=== Due process ===
The Due Process Clause in the Fifth Amendment to the United States Constitution prohibits the deprivation of "life, liberty, or property, without due process of law". In the context of removal pursuant to US immigration and nationality law, this is limited to procedural due process, as the substance of such law is generally immune to judicial review. Removal is an administrative matter, so the "provisions of the Constitution securing the right of trial by jury and prohibiting unreasonable searches and seizures and cruel and unusual punishments have no application". Procedural due process requires government officials to give a person proper notice and an opportunity to be heard before depriving that person of their life, liberty, or property. After his arrest on March 12, 2025, Abrego Garcia was denied the opportunity to be heard by any judicial officer and instead "was shuttled between detainment facilities before being flown to El Salvador on March 15, without having seen a judge."

== Arrest and deportation in 2025 ==
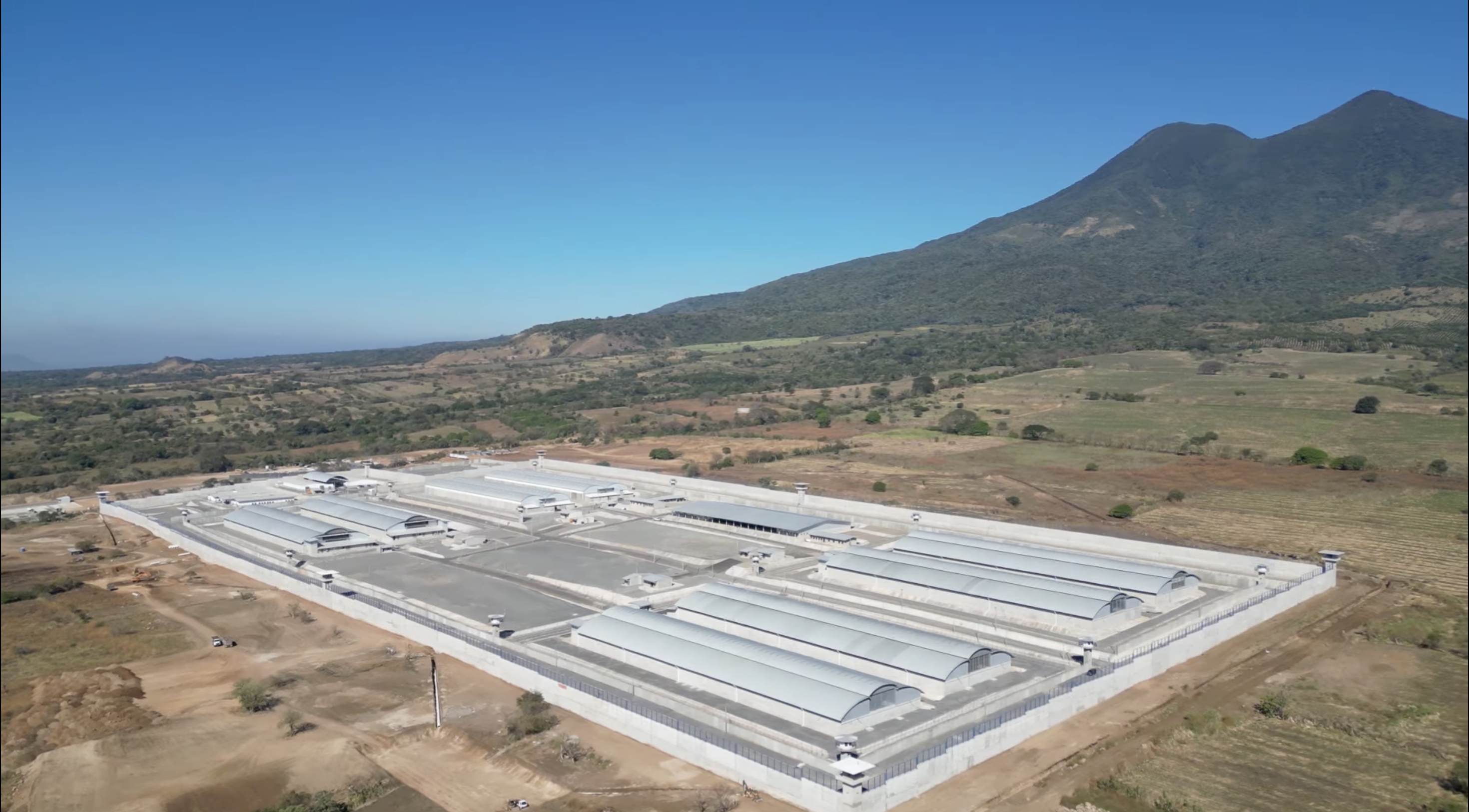
CECOT, the maximum security prison in El Salvador where Abrego Garcia was sent by the US government

On March 12, 2025, after working at his job as a union apprentice, Abrego Garcia picked his son up from his grandmother's house. After leaving the house, a Department of Homeland Security (DHS) agent stopped Abrego Garcia's car. The agent told Abrego Garcia that his immigration "status had changed", waited until his wife arrived to take custody of their son, and then arrested Abrego Garcia. Abrego Garcia's wife said that ICE called her after detaining her husband and told her "she had ten minutes to pick up her son before he was turned over to child protective services." Detained in Baltimore, Abrego Garcia told his wife that he was repeatedly questioned about whether he was connected to MS-13, and that agents had referenced a restaurant that his family often went to as well as a photo of him playing basketball. In the following days, ICE transferred Abrego Garcia to a detention facility in Louisiana and then to one in Texas.

Abrego Garcia called Vasquez Sura on March 15 from Texas, telling his wife that he was being deported to CECOT.

On March 15, the Trump administration sent three planes with Salvadoran and Venezuelan deportees, including Abrego Garcia, to CECOT in El Salvador, alleging that they were members of criminal organizations. A Bloomberg investigation found that approximately 90% of the Venezuelans had no US criminal record other than traffic or immigration violations.

Robert Cerna, an ICE official, stated in a sworn filing that "Abrego Garcia's protected status had not appeared on the flight manifest for the deportations" and that as a result, he was listed as an "alternate" and took another detainee's place when some who were expected to be deported were instead removed from the deportation list. In his sworn testimony, "Cerna referred to Abrego Garcia's 'purported membership in MS-13', but he did not describe him as a confirmed gang member, gang leader, or terrorist." He had not been charged with a crime in the U.S.

After he was transported to the Terrorism Confinement Center, Abrego Garcia's family had no contact with him.

== Contesting the deportation ==
=== Initial consideration in the Maryland district court ===
==== Lawsuit ====
Abrego Garcia v. Noem
- Court: United States District Court for the District of Maryland
- Started: March 24, 2025
- Docket nos.: 8:25-cv-00951

Court membership
- Judge sitting: Paula Xinis

Abrego Garcia's wife sued the United States on March 24, 2025, with herself, Abrego Garcia, and their son as plaintiffs. Their attorneys sought court intervention to compel the U.S. federal government to seek Abrego Garcia's return to the United States. The case was assigned to Judge Paula Xinis. The U.S. government later acknowledged in a court filing that "[a]lthough ICE was aware of his protection from removal to El Salvador, Abrego Garcia was removed to El Salvador because of an administrative error." This admission marked the first acknowledgment of a mistake related to the deportation of hundreds of people to El Salvador on March 15.

==== Internal Trump administration discussions ====
The Atlantic reported that soon after discovering the mistaken deportation, officials from the DHS, the DOJ, and the State Department (DOS) started working to find a way to bring Abrego Garcia back to the United States. Officials "went so far as to float the idea of having the U.S. ambassador to El Salvador make a personal appeal to the country's president for Abrego Garcia's return". However, White House officials reportedly took over the case, seeing the case as about more than Abrego Garcia and instead as "a measure of whether Donald Trump's administration can send people—citizens or not—to foreign prisons without due process".

The New York Times acquired some of the administration's initial written discussion of the case, and said that soon after the lawsuit was filed, lawyers from the Departments of Homeland Security, Justice, and State conferred, but differed on how to respond. James Percival, a Trump appointee to the DHS, initially suggested that it should not be publicly acknowledged as a mistake. He reportedly asked whether they could tell the court that Abrego Garcia is a "leader" of MS-13, and wrote "We are working to fix it so he doesn't need to be returned to the U.S." The DHS reportedly sought to have Abrego Garcia's withholding of removal order terminated, and the DOS asked whether it would be necessary to comply with a judicial order to bring him back to the U.S. Erez Reuveni, a career lawyer at the DOJ, opposed these proposals, and argued that the administration should seek Abrego Garcia's immediate return, as losing the lawsuit could jeopardize "many far more important initiatives of the current administration".

The administration ostensibly sought to keep Abrego Garcia separated from the gangs at CECOT. In response to a July request from Senator Dick Durbin, the ranking member of the Senate Judiciary Committee, Reuveni provided copies of early emails and text message exchanges, which also addressed others' deportation to El Salvador on March 15. The New York Times reported that the messages "paint a startling picture of an administration determined to send the men to a foreign prison without judicial review first".

==== Early public statements from the Trump administration ====
The White House denied that the administration was trying to bring Abrego Garcia back to the U.S., with press secretary Karoline Leavitt stating "The Administration has always maintained the position that Abrego Garcia was the man we rightfully intended to deport because he is an illegal immigrant and MS-13 gang member."

==== Court hearing and Xinis's ruling ====
In court on April 4, the Trump administration argued that the court lacked jurisdiction to order Abrego Garcia's return, as he was no longer in US custody. Abrego Garcia's lawyer, Simon Sandoval-Moshenberg, said that the U.S. government was claiming "that the court is powerless to order any relief ... If that's true, the immigration laws are meaningless—all of them—because the government can deport whoever they want, wherever they want, whenever they want, and no court can do anything about it once it's done." He requested that if necessary, the court order the Trump administration to withhold the money it was paying El Salvador to imprison men at CECOT.

Erez Reuveni represented the Trump administration, and admitted the deportation was a mistake, saying "the facts are conceded, plaintiff Abrego Garcia should not have been removed." Reuveni was sometimes unable to answer questions from Xinis, telling her that the DOJ had failed to give him the necessary information, and when questioned about why the government was not able to return Abrego Garcia to the U.S., Reuveni said that he had asked the same question to government officials and had not received an answer.

At the end of the hearing, Xinis ruled that Abrego Garcia's deportation to El Salvador, without any kind of judicial documentation warranting it, was illegal, and she ordered the government to ensure his return to the U.S. no later than 11:59 pm April 7. She described CECOT as "one of the most notoriously inhumane and dangerous prisons in the world" that "by design, deprives its detainees of adequate food, water, and shelter, fosters routine violence", and placed Abrego Garcia with his persecutors, and said leaving Abrego Garcia in prison while the lawsuit proceeded would constitute irreparable harm.

The next day, Judge Xinis issued a 22-page opinion reaffirming her April 4 ruling. The opinion stated the deportation "shocks the conscience" and was "wholly lawless". She also said that while there were previous assertions of Abrego Garcia's membership in MS-13, the government had not presented evidence he was a member and had essentially abandoned that argument in her court. The judge noted that by publicly labeling him a member of MS-13, the government had placed Abrego Garcia at risk in the detention facility, as El Salvador "intentionally mixes rival gang members" in the facility. Xinis wrote "Defendants seized Abrego Garcia without any lawful authority; held him in three separate domestic detention centers without legal basis; failed to present him to any immigration judge or officer; and forcibly transported him to El Salvador in direct contravention of [immigration law]."

In response to the government's argument that the court did not have jurisdiction over the matter since Abrego Garcia was no longer in the United States, the judge said: "Surely, Defendants do not mean to suggest that they have wholesale erased the substantive and procedural protections of federal immigration law in one fell swoop by dropping those individuals in CECOT without recourse." The judge referred to Secretary of Homeland Security Kristi Noem's visit to CECOT where she described the prison as "one of the tools in our toolkit that we will use" in arguing that, like any other "contract facility" that the government pays for detention, the government had the power to secure and transport detainees, including Abrego Garcia back from El Salvador.

==== Erez Reuveni ====
Reuveni had been promoted to acting deputy director of the DOJ Office of Immigration Litigation on March 21. The day after the hearing, the DOJ placed Reuveni on administrative leave along with his supervisor August "Auggie" Flentje. Attorney General Pam Bondi stated DOJ attorneys are "required to zealously advocate on behalf of the United States", and anyone who failed to do so "will face consequences." Bondi later added "He did not argue ... He shouldn't have taken the case. He shouldn't have argued it, if that's what he was going to do ... You have to vigorously argue on behalf of your client." Politico noted that despite Bondi's assertions, Reuveni "did argue that Xinis had no jurisdiction to consider the case". The DOJ fired Reuveni on April 15, saying that he had sabotaged the Abrego Garcia case. Another lawyer in the Office of Immigration Litigation, Joseph A. Darrow, later resigned and said that people were "shocked and despondent" over Reuveni's treatment. Two additional lawyers resigned. One, Erin Ryan, wrote in her farewell email that the response to Reuveni was "an act of intimidation against all the attorneys who work here" and "put us in an impossible position where we have to decide between keeping this job pushing a partisan agenda, or maintaining our ethical obligation to the court and thus our bar license."

On June 24, Reuveni filed a whistleblower report alleging that just before he was put on administrative leave, he was ordered to file a brief claiming that Abrego Garcia was a terrorist, which he refused because he believed it to be "contrary to law, frivolous, and untrue".

=== Initial appeal to the Fourth Circuit ===
Abrego Garcia v. Noem
- Court: 4th Cir.
- Full case name: Kilmar Armando Abrego Garcia et al. v. Kristi Noem et al.
- Decided: April 7, 2025
- Docket nos.: 25-1345

Case history
- Appealed from: D. Md.

Court membership
- Judges sitting: Robert King, Stephanie Thacker, Harvie Wilkinson III

On April 5, the Department of Justice appealed Xinis's order to the United States Court of Appeals for the Fourth Circuit, where it was assigned to a panel consisting of judges Stephanie Thacker, Harvie Wilkinson III, and Robert King. On April 7, the panel unanimously denied the appeal. The appellate court stated that "[The Government] has no legal authority to snatch a person who is lawfully present in the United States off the street and remove him from the country without due process ... The Government's contention otherwise, and its argument that the federal courts are powerless to intervene, are unconscionable."

=== Emergency appeal to the United States Supreme Court ===
Noem v. Abrego Garcia
- Supreme Court of the United States

Decided April 10, 2025
- Full case name: Kristi Noem, Secretary, Department of Homeland Security, et al. v. Kilmar Armando Abrego Garcia, et al.
- Docket no.: 24A949
- Citations: 604 U.S. (more)

Holding
- The District Court "properly requires the Government to 'facilitate' Abrego Garcia's release from custody in El Salvador and to ensure that his case is handled as it would have been had he not been improperly sent to El Salvador"

Court membership
- Chief Justice John Roberts Associate Justices Clarence Thomas · Samuel Alito; Sonia Sotomayor · Elena Kagan; Neil Gorsuch · Brett Kavanaugh; Amy Coney Barrett · Ketanji Brown Jackson

Case opinion
- Per curiam
- Statement: Sotomayor, joined by Kagan, Jackson

On April 7, the Trump administration appealed the Fourth Circuit's ruling via the Supreme Court's emergency docket. The same day, Chief Justice John Roberts temporarily stayed Xinis's order, allowing the administration to leave Abrego Garcia in CECOT pending further review from the entire Supreme Court. In his Supreme Court filing after the stay was issued, Abrego Garcia's lawyer argued for his release, and said "he sits in a foreign prison solely at the behest of the United States, as the product of a Kafka-esque mistake."

On April 10, the Supreme Court released an unsigned order with no public dissents. In reciting the facts of the case the court stated: "The United States acknowledges that Abrego Garcia was subject to a withholding order forbidding his removal to El Salvador, and that the removal to El Salvador was therefore illegal." It ruled that the District Court "properly requires the Government to 'facilitate' Abrego Garcia's release from custody in El Salvador and to ensure that his case is handled as it would have been had he not been improperly sent to El Salvador."

Justice Sotomayor wrote a concurring statement joined by justices Kagan and Jackson, writing in part:

The Government now requests an order from this Court permitting it to leave Abrego Garcia, a husband and father without a criminal record, in a Salvadoran prison for no reason recognized by the law. The only argument the Government offers in support of its request, that United States courts cannot grant relief once a deportee crosses the border, is plainly wrong. [...] The Government's argument, moreover, implies that it could deport and incarcerate any person, including U. S. citizens, without legal consequence, so long as it does so before a court can intervene. That view refutes itself.

The Supreme Court did not rule that the federal government must bring Abrego Garcia back to the United States immediately. Judge Xinis had ordered the government to "facilitate and effectuate" his return, and the Supreme Court said the order to "facilitate" his return was proper, but "effectuate" was unclear and possibly beyond her authority. The court remanded the case to the district court, telling Xinis to clarify the issue "with due regard for the deference owed to the Executive Branch in the conduct of foreign affairs", while the government "should be prepared to share what it can concerning the steps it has taken and the prospect of further steps".

Both sides claimed victory, with one of Abrego Garcia's lawyers stating "The rule of law won today. Time to bring him home," while a Justice Department spokesman said the decision recognized the "exclusive prerogative of the president to conduct foreign affairs", and it "illustrates that activist judges do not have the jurisdiction to seize control of the president's authority to conduct foreign policy."

== Order to "facilitate" Abrego Garcia's return ==
=== Return to the district court ===
==== Revised order and initial hearing ====
External videos
- "Attorney for Kilmar Abrego Garcia Speaks to Reporters", April 11, 2025, C-SPAN

After the Supreme Court's April 10 ruling remanding certain issues back to the district court, Judge Xinis quickly amended her earlier order that the Trump administration "facilitate and effectuate" Abrego Garcia's return, telling the Trump administration instead to "take all available steps to facilitate the return of Abrego Garcia to the United States as soon as possible" and to update her on the morning of April 11, providing information about the steps that the government had taken, where Abrego Garcia was then located, and what additional steps it plans to take; she also scheduled a hearing for that afternoon.

The government requested that she extend the deadline for submitting the update until the following week and postpone the status hearing, and Xinis quickly ordered that she would only give them an extra two hours for the update. The government's subsequent filing only said that it was "impractical" to update her at that time. During the status hearing, Xinis asked Drew Ensign, a deputy assistant attorney general, where Abrego Garcia was then located, what the government had done so far to facilitate his return, and what its plans were, and he responded that he did not know.

The hearing ended with Xinis ordering the Trump administration to provide "daily updates" answering her previous questions, from an official with "personal knowledge" of the situation.

==== Government updates and claims ====
In the administration's April 12 update, State Department official Michael Kozak cited "official reporting from our Embassy in San Salvador" stating that Abrego Garcia is alive and "currently being held in the Terrorism Confinement Center in El Salvador ... He is detained pursuant to the sovereign, domestic authority of El Salvador." However, in a memo detailing the transfer, El Salvador implied the United States retained decision-making power. El Salvador later said that the Trump administration maintains control of the men sent to CECOT. The Trump administration's April 12 update did not provide information on past and future steps to "facilitate" Abrego Garcia's return.

The Trump administration, via ICE official Evan Katz, told the court on April 13 that it had "no updates" for Xinis. While Katz acknowledged that Abrego Garcia "should not have been removed to El Salvador", Katz also wrote that Abrego Garcia "is no longer eligible for withholding of removal [to El Salvador] because of his membership in MS-13 which is now a designated foreign terrorist organization". Xinis had previously ruled that there was no evidence that Abrego Garcia was part of a gang.

Separately, the Trump administration told the district court on April 13 that it interpreted the order to "facilitate" Abrego Garcia's return only as an order to "remove any domestic obstacles" in the U.S. to Abrego Garcia's return, so there was no requirement to more actively seek Abrego Garcia's release. The Trump administration further declared that the federal judiciary had "no authority to direct" the Trump administration "to conduct foreign relations in a particular way, or engage with a foreign sovereign in a given manner".

The Trump administration objected to providing more information about efforts to return Abrego Garcia, stating that "discovery could interfere with ongoing diplomatic discussions" with El Salvador. As for information on the Trump administration's deal with El Salvador to imprison deported immigrants, the administration argued against revealing that information due to it being classified, potentially a state secret, or under attorney-client privilege.

In the April 14 update, DHS lawyer Joseph Mazzara told the court that his department "does not have authority to forcibly extract an alien from the domestic custody of a foreign sovereign nation." In the April 15 update, Mazzara relayed that the Department of Homeland Security is "prepared to facilitate Abrego Garcia's presence in the United States ... if he presents at a port of entry", and appended a transcript of an April 14 White House meeting between Trump and Bukele. The next day, Mazzara stated that there were "no further updates" regarding the situation.

==== Expedited discovery order ====
After the Trump administration's continued inaction in facilitating Abrego Garcia's release and return to the United States, on April 15, Xinis approved a request from Abrego Garcia's lawyers for expedited discovery, ordering the government to turn over specific kinds of documents requested by the lawyers that are related to Abrego Garcia's deportation and their efforts to return him, and requiring written responses to a related set of 15 questions posed by the lawyers, known as interrogatories. She also ordered several government officials who had filed declarations to sit for depositions, including Joseph Mazzara, the Department of Homeland Security's acting general counsel, and Robert Cerna, the acting field office director for Immigration and Customs Enforcement. She said that she would review this evidence in assessing whether the government should be held in contempt of court, which Abrego Garcia's lawyers had requested.

==== Appeal of the expedited discovery order ====
On April 16, the Trump administration returned to the Fourth Circuit, asking the court to stay Xinis's order for expedited discovery, calling it a "fishing expedition". The next day, judges King, Thacker, and Wilkinson unanimously denied the appeal. In a seven-page ruling, Judge Wilkinson said that Trump was evidently seeking the "weakening the courts" through his "constant intimations of its [the courts'] illegitimacy", and he warned that Trump was also harming himself by creating "a public perception of its [the presidency's] lawlessness and all of its attendant contagions". The Associated Press described the order as an "extraordinary condemnation". The court called the government's request "both extraordinary and premature" and went on to say:

The government is asserting a right to stash away residents of this country in foreign prisons without the semblance of due process that is the foundation of our constitutional order. Further, it claims in essence that because it has rid itself of custody that there is nothing that can be done. This should be shocking not only to judges, but to the intuitive sense of liberty that Americans far removed from courthouses still hold dear.

The appeals court rejected the government's argument that all it must do to facilitate Abrego Garcia's return is to remove domestic obstacles, ruling Trump officials are not allowed "to do essentially nothing." Judge Wilkinson stated that Abrego Garcia is entitled to due process regardless of whether he is a member of MS-13, and if the government is confident about its allegation that he is, it can initiate immigration court "proceedings to terminate the withholding of removal order" once he is back in the U.S.

==== Expedited discovery production ====
Xinis had ordered the government to produce the requested documents and respond to the interrogatories by April 21, and the next day, Abrego Garcia's lawyers said that the government had produced "nothing of substance" and asked for a hearing. The New York Times described the government's responses as part of "a pattern of stonewalling" in which it was coming "ever closer to an open showdown with the judicial branch in a way that could threaten the constitutional balance of power". Despite courts having ordered the federal authorities to facilitate Abrego Garcia's return, DOJ lawyers said that the discovery requests were "based on the false premise that the United States can or has been ordered to facilitate Abrego Garcia's release from custody in El Salvador". Xinis responded with another order, stating that the government was engaged in "a willful and bad faith refusal to comply with discovery obligations" and had "sought refuge behind vague and unsubstantiated assertions of privilege". She gave the government an additional day to respond to the discovery demands, and said that any assertions of privilege must be accompanied by "specific legal and factual showings".

On April 23, both the government and Abrego Garcia's lawyers filed motions under seal, and with both parties' agreement, Xinis paused the discovery deadline until April 30. When the government asked her to stay her discovery order a second time, she denied the request and set new deadlines for early May. On May 7, Xinis revealed the administration had invoked the state secrets privilege in the case, and set a hearing on the issue for May 16. The following week, Abrego Garcia's lawyers indicated that there had been "sealed ex parte communications" in which the government had "apparently suggested to this Court ... that it was working to secure Abrego Garcia's return". Sandoval-Moshenberg, one of Abrego Garcia's lawyers, told the HuffPost that the government had been "saying one thing in court filings and another thing in the media."

On May 16, Xinis held two hearings, one public and the other closed. She questioned the DOJ lawyer, Jonathan Guynn, about the government's invocation of the state secrets privilege, telling him that it was insufficient for the government to essentially tell her "Take my word for it". Abrego Garcia's lawyers said that the government had been largely non-responsive to their discovery requests, supplying 132 photocopies of court filings and the discovery requests themselves; 16 of the remaining 32 supplied related to Van Hollen's visit, and 1,140 documents were withheld as privileged. After the hearing, Xinis ordered that a sealed statement from Secretary of State Rubio be unsealed, and granted a request from Abrego Garcia's lawyers to depose three more administration officials. Rubio had said that "Compelled disclosure of any sensitive communications or discussions with the Government of El Salvador regarding Abrego Garcia's removal and confinement in CECOT and Centro Industrial threatens significant harm to the United States' foreign affairs and national security interests", and that the same was true for the steps the government "has or has not taken" to secure Abrego Garcia's release.

A group of more than 20 press organizations requested that Xinis unseal documents that were under seal, including documents related to the government's request that Xinis stay discovery at the end of April. On June 4, she ruled that several of the documents would be unsealed, though portions would be redacted. The administration had opposed the request on the basis of national security and the potential to negatively impact negotiations with the Salvadoran government, but the unsealed documents contained little information that was not already public.

==== Abrego Garcia's return ====
The government brought Abrego Garcia back to the U.S. on June 6 to face new criminal charges in Tennessee, and the DOJ then asked Xinis to pause the proceedings in her court in anticipation of their filing a motion to dismiss the case entirely. Abrego Garcia's lawyers opposed this, arguing that the government had engaged in "blatant, willful and persistent violations of court orders" and should be held to account for them, and that Xinis still had jurisdiction to find the government in contempt. On June 11, Abrego Garcia's lawyers filed a motion alleging that the government had not only ignored court orders, but had "willfully sought to impede the discovery process", and they asked Xinis to impose sanctions. Five days later, the government filed its motion to dismiss the case, arguing that because Abrego Garcia was now back in the U.S., the case was moot. His lawyers opposed dismissal, and in early July, Xinis denied the government's motion to dismiss the case.

On July 2, his lawyers asked for permission to file an amended complaint. In their motion, they stated that during his time in El Salvador, Abrego Garcia was subject to "severe beatings, severe sleep deprivation, inadequate nutrition, and psychological torture". The motion also said that the prison staff at CECOT had separated prisoners who had gang member tattoos from those who did not, and placed him in the group of prisoners without gang tattoos.

Judge Xinis ruled on July 23 that when Abrego Garcia is released from pretrial detention in his criminal case in Tennessee, the government could not immediately take him into immigration custody, and that if the government planned to deport him to a third country, he must be given 72 hours notice, so that he would not be at risk of "re-deportation without due process". The same day, Judge Crenshaw in Tennessee rejected the government's request that he revoke his ruling that Abrego Garcia be released pending trial.

=== Trump–Bukele White House meeting ===
Trump, Pam Bondi, Stephen Miller, Nayib Bukele, and Marco Rubio comment on Abrego Garcia in the Oval Office, April 2025.

During an April 14 meeting between presidents Trump and Nayib Bukele, Bukele told reporters it was "absurd" to ask if he would return Abrego Garcia. Bukele said:

Are you suggesting I smuggle a terrorist into the United States? How can I return him to the United States, like I smuggle him into the United States? Of course, I'm not going to do it. The question is preposterous. [...] We just turned the murder capital of the world into the safest country in the western hemisphere, and you want us to go back into releasing criminals, so we can go back to being the murder capital of the world? That's not going to happen.

During the meeting, US Attorney General Pam Bondi said that it was up to El Salvador, not the American government, whether Abrego Garcia would be released. Trump added that the reporters would "love to have a criminal released into our country. These are sick people". PolitiFact identified several misleading statements made by administration officials and Bukele during the meeting. Poynter Institute found the following statements to be misleading:

- Marco Rubio said that Abrego Garcia was "illegally in the United States and was returned to his country. That's where you deport people back to their country of origin", failing to recognize that Abrego Garcia had been legally working in the United States since 2019 under the withholding of removal granted in 2019.
- Pam Bondi said "In 2019, two courts, an immigration court and an appellate immigration court, ruled that [Abrego Garcia] was a member of MS-13"; however, "The immigration judges' decision to deny bond is not equivalent to ruling that Abrego Garcia was a gang member".

Poynter Institute and the libertarian magazine Reason both found the following statements by Stephen Miller to be misleading:

- "We won (the Supreme Court) case 9–0 and people like CNN are portraying it as a loss", and "The Supreme Court said the district court order was unlawful and its main components were reversed 9–0 unanimously". The Supreme Court actually found that the government had failed to follow the law and the orders of the court.

National Review commentator Andrew McCarthy said that Pam Bondi's statement that two courts ruled that Abrego Garcia is a member of MS-13 was "deeply misleading" and that "[it] also departs from the Justice Department's tradition of providing a complete version of facts – even facts that cut against the government's position – because it's the right thing to do and promotes DOJ's credibility with the judiciary and the public."

Trump again raised the issue of deporting and jailing American citizens, telling Bukele "Home-growns are next. The home-growns. You gotta build about five more places. It's not big enough."

=== Sen. Van Hollen's trip to El Salvador and meeting with Abrego Garcia ===
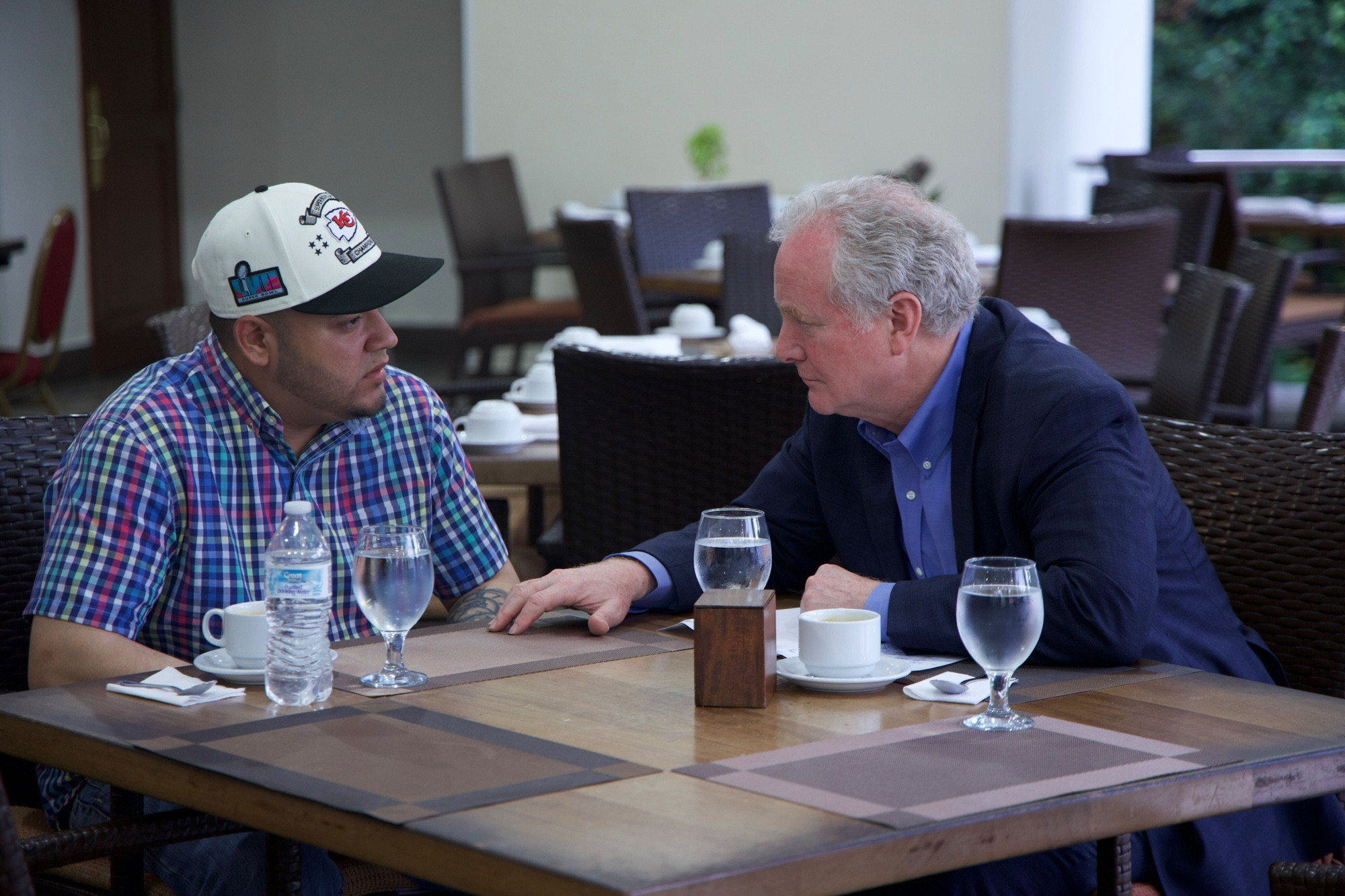
Chris Van Hollen meeting with Abrego Garcia in El Salvador, April 2025

In an April 13 letter to Milena Mayorga, the Salvadoran ambassador to the U.S., Senator Chris Van Hollen of Maryland requested a meeting with Bukele during his visit to the United States the next day, to discuss Abrego Garcia's return. The meeting did not occur, and on April 16, Van Hollen traveled to El Salvador from the United States with the intention of visiting Abrego Garcia in prison to assess his health and to meet with representatives of the Salvadoran government in an effort to obtain his release.

At a press conference later that day, Van Hollen said that he had met with El Salvador's vice president, Félix Ulloa, who told him that the senator had not given sufficient advance notice to arrange a visit with Abrego Garcia. When Van Hollen asked whether he could return the following week, or if either he or Abrego Garcia's wife could speak with him by phone, Ulloa suggested he direct those requests to the U.S. Embassy. Van Hollen said that he asked why Abrego Garcia was being held at CECOT even though he had not been convicted of any crimes in either the U.S. or El Salvador, and described Ulloa's response as "the Trump administration is paying El Salvador, the government of El Salvador to keep him at CECOT."

External videos
- "El Salvador trip was to defend 'the rights of this man to due process': Van Hollen", April 20, 2025, ABC News, "This Week"

On April 17, Salvadoran officials brought Abrego Garcia to meet Van Hollen at his hotel. Abrego Garcia was provided with non-prison clothes and a cap to cover his head, which had been shaved by the prison. According to Van Hollen, Abrego Garcia told him during that meeting that he had been moved from CECOT to a prison in Santa Ana, El Salvador, eight days before, and that his experience at CECOT "traumatized" him. The DOJ later said that the Santa Ana facility is the Centro Industrial Penitentiary.

According to Van Hollen, the Salvadoran government tried to have the meeting occur poolside, but the senator said he had them take it to a dining area indoors. While they were talking, margarita-like drinks were placed in front of them, which they did not drink. Pictures including the drinks were used by Bukele in social media posts to ridicule the meeting and deny that Abrego Garcia had been treated poorly. Van Hollen later said "I mean, this is a guy who's been in CECOT. This guy has been detained. They want to create this appearance that life was just lovely for Kilmar, which, of course, is a big fat lie."

Concerning the meeting, Bukele tweeted, "Now that he's been confirmed healthy, he gets the honor of staying in El Salvador's custody." Trump accused Van Hollen of grandstanding, saying the senator "looked like a fool".

Roger Stone accused Van Hollen of violating the Logan Act, "a 200-year-old law aimed at preventing people from undermining the government". However, Julian Ku, a law professor at Hofstra University, noted that accusations of violations of the Logan Act are a "useful way for people to accuse each other of undermining US foreign policy" but is not a "meaningful law" that is "likely to ever be used", especially given that no one has ever been convicted under the law, and the last prosecution happened in 1853.

On April 29, Van Hollen sent a letter to Trump, detailing his meeting with Ulloa. Van Hollen stated that Ulloa had said "We have a deal with the U.S. government. They send people. We host them. They pay. And that's it." Van Hollen added that if Trump can defy a court order and strip Abrego Garcia of his rights, the same could happen with anyone else. Van Hollen later released a video of his discussion with Ulloa, confirming the quote in his letter to Trump. In the video, Ulloa also said that El Salvador had no evidence of Abrego Garcia being a criminal.

=== Others travel to El Salvador to seek his release ===
Meanwhile, on April 16, Representative Delia Ramirez, a Democratic member of the House Homeland Security Committee, proposed a congressional member delegation to El Salvador. Representative Mark Green, the Republican committee chair, denied the request, replying the next day that the Democrats were welcome to "use their own personal credit cards" to visit the prison.

The week after Van Hollen's trip, four Democratic members of the House of Representatives – Yassamin Ansari (Arizona), Maxine Dexter (Oregon), Maxwell Frost (Florida) and Robert Garcia (California) – traveled to El Salvador, accompanied by Chris Newman, one of Abrego Garcia's lawyers. They were again hoping to meet with Abrego Garcia, and seeking his release and return to the U.S. Frost said that another purpose of the trip was to ensure that "our country is following our laws", a concern echoed by others. Ansari said that the case was not only about Abrego Garcia himself, but about "the future of our democracy" and due process. Newman also spoke of the need for Abrego Garcia to have access to counsel. The group's request to meet with Abrego Garcia was rejected.

Prior to the trip, Garcia and Frost had written James Comer, chair of the House Oversight Committee, asking that the trip be considered an official delegation, but the request was rejected. The Republicans on the committee tweeted "Your request to visit a foreign MS-13 gang member in El Salvador on taxpayer dollars (and possibly drink margaritas) has been denied", and the members of the group paid their own way, despite Republican representatives Jason Smith (Missouri) and Riley Moore (West Virginia) having had their requests to visit CECOT approved.

The group also wrote to Secretary of State Marco Rubio, asking him to regularly check on Abrego Garcia's well-being, seek his return, and enable his access to counsel. While in El Salvador, the group met with human rights activists at the Universidad Centroamericano and with US embassy staff, from whom they received a classified briefing, and the group sought the release of other detainees. They called attention to some by name, such as Andry José Hernández. Lindsay Toczylowski of the Immigrant Defenders Law Center, which represents Hernandez and nine other men that the U.S. sent to CECOT, said "The government wants to disappear these people, so we think talking about who these individuals are and making sure elected officials don't forget about them is the most important lever we have to get them back."

On the weekend of May 25, Representative Glenn Ivey, who represents the district where Abrego Garcia was living in Maryland, traveled to El Salvador in an effort to see Abrego Garcia. Ivey was accompanied by one of Abrego Garcia's lawyers and a member of the union that Abrego Garcia belongs to, who also wished to meet with him. The U.S. ambassador to El Salvador had contacted the Salvadoran government prior to their trip, requesting that the group be able to meet with Abrego Garcia, but it was not approved.

== Return to the United States and criminal charges ==
United States v. Abrego Garcia
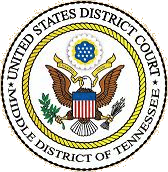
- Court: United States District Court for the Middle District of Tennessee
- Full case name: United States of America v. Kilmar Armando Abrego Garcia
- Submitted: May 21, 2025
- Charge: Conspiracy to transport aliens (1 felony count); Unlawful transportation of undocumented aliens (1 felony count)
- Citation: 3:25-cr-00115

Court membership
- Judge sitting: Waverly Crenshaw

On June 6, 2025, the government brought Abrego Garcia back to the U.S., and the DOJ announced that he had been indicted in Tennessee for unlawfully transporting illegal immigrants for financial gain, and conspiring to do so. The case was assigned to Tennessee District Judge Waverly Crenshaw. The indictment had been filed on May 21 under seal and was unsealed on June 6. A federal arrest warrant was issued after the indictment was filed, and the day of Abrego Garcia's return, Attorney General Bondi said that the U.S. had presented the arrest warrant to the government of El Salvador. President Bukele tweeted that "of course we wouldn't refuse" a US request to return someone to face charges.

One of Abrego Garcia's lawyers, Simon Sandoval Moshenberg, said that the administration's decision to bring Abrego Garcia back to the U.S. in order to prosecute him indicated that it had been "playing games with the court all along". Another of his lawyers, Andrew Rossman, said that the return proved that the administration could have brought him back earlier but "just refused to do so".

The next day, Trump said he did not speak with Bukele about releasing Abrego Garcia, and it "wasn't my decision" to bring him back to the U.S., but was instead the DOJ's decision. Trump called Senator Van Hollen a "loser" for having defended Abrego Garcia's due process rights, and White House spokesperson Karoline Leavitt said Van Hollen should "immediately apologize to Garcia's victims". Van Hollen responded that he "will never apologize for defending the Constitution", and instead Trump "should apologize to the country for violating his oath to the Constitution."

Ben Schrader, the chief of the criminal division of the US Attorney's Office in Nashville, resigned. According to ABC News, his resignation was based on concerns that Abrego Garcia's case was being pursued for political reasons.

The indictment stems from a late 2022 traffic stop in Tennessee, in which Abrego Garcia is now alleged to have been engaged in human smuggling. The owner of the vehicle, Jose Ramon Hernandez-Reyes, who was not there at the time, had previously been convicted of transporting illegal aliens, and after completing his sentence, he was convicted of illegally re-entering the U.S. In April 2025, while Hernandez-Reyes was serving a sentence for his illegal re-entry, federal officers spoke with him in prison, reportedly to question him about the 2022 stop. The officers allegedly granted him limited immunity, and were told that he met Abrego Garcia in 2015 and hired him periodically to transport illegal immigrants. The indictment alleges that Abrego Garcia made more than 100 trips over almost 10 years, and that the larger conspiracy involved smuggling thousands of illegal immigrants, including children and members of the MS-13 gang. Although the indictment discusses co-conspirators, it does not include charges against any of them. It also alleges uncharged crimes, such as transporting illegal firearms.

In her June 6 press conference about the indictment, Bondi said that witnesses had spoken of Abrego Garcia's involvement in other crimes, including murder and the solicitation of child pornography. These allegations were not included the indictment, but were included in the DOJ's motion for pretrial detention. When asked what had changed that Abrego Garcia was now being charged, Bondi said that due to the attention that Abrego Garcia's case had received, there were "recently found facts". According to CNN, a witness reached out to the DOJ due to the case's publicity.

Upon return, Abrego Garcia was taken to court to hear the charges, where he confirmed to the magistrate judge, Barbara Holmes, that he understood them. The DOJ filed a motion that he be held in detention pending trial, on the grounds that he is a flight risk and is too dangerous to release on bail. He would remain in jail at least until Holmes ruled on the detention motion. Abrego Garcia was represented by public defenders, who opposed the pretrial detention motion, arguing that he is neither a flight risk nor a danger to the public, and that the crimes with which he has been charged do not normally involve pretrial detention.

In a June 13 arraignment hearing, Abrego Garcia pleaded not guilty to the charges. The motion for pretrial detention was also addressed. The government was represented by acting US attorney Rob McGuire. Magistrate Judge Holmes called the flight risk argument "academic", since immigration had already placed a hold on Abrego Garcia and could take him into custody even if she ruled that he should not be held in detention. Peter Joseph, a DHS special agent, was the only witness at the hearing. He said that he was assigned to the case on April 28, 2025, and that the investigation involved information from confidential witnesses and from license plate readers in several states. Four of the five confidential witnesses are members of a single family, and three of five have pending criminal and immigration cases, and made their statements as part of cooperation deals. One of the witnesses is Jose Ramon Hernandez-Reyes, who owned the car Abrego Garcia was driving when he was stopped in Tennessee in 2022. In exchange for his witness testimony, Hernandez-Reyes, who had been imprisoned and was supposed to be deported after serving his sentence, was moved to a half-way house and will be allowed to remain in the U.S., likely with work authorization. Joseph also said that there was erroneous information in an earlier DHS report about the traffic stop, and that DHS had been able to identify six of the passengers who were in the car at the time, all of whom had entered the country illegally.

On June 18, Abrego Garcia replaced his public defenders with Rascoe Dean, a former deputy criminal chief in the U.S. attorney's office that is now trying Abrego Garcia, and three lawyers with Hecker Fink LLP, which specializes in defending clients against federal investigations.

On June 22, Holmes denied the DOJ's motion for pretrial detention, as the government had not proved that Abrego Garcia met any of the conditions that result in detention, such as being a flight risk or posing a danger to others. She scheduled a hearing to determine the conditions for his release, while also noting the likelihood that he would be taken into ICE custody upon release. The DOJ appealed Holmes' ruling later that day. On June 30, the judge delayed the release of Abrego Garcia until at least mid July at the request of his lawyers. His lawyers requested the delay due to the possibility García would be immediately deported to another country upon his release from the custody of the US Marshals.

On July 23, Judge Crenshaw ordered that Abrego Garcia be released on bail, saying that the government had failed to present any convincing evidence that Abrego Garcia would pose a threat to the public if released. However, his release was delayed for 30 days at the request of his lawyers, who asked that he remain in custody while they prepared for possible efforts to deport him once he was released. The same day, Maryland District Judge Paula Xinis barred US immigration authorities from immediately deporting Abrego Garcia once he was released from prison, saying that he must be given at least 72 hours notice to contest the decision if the government wished to open deportation proceedings.

On July 31, Judge Crenshaw ordered the Trump administration to moderate its public comments about Garcia, to ensure a fair trial. The order came after Secretary of Homeland Security Kristi Noem referred to Garcia as a "horrible human being" and a "monster" who "should never be released," and accused him of crimes with which he was not charged. The court had previously ordered both sides to cease making public statements about the case. On October 27, Judge Crenshaw ruled that Bondi and Noem had violated a court rule limiting government officials from making out-of-court remarks regarding pending cases. The judge ordered prosecutors to circulate the court order to all DOJ and DHS employees.

On August 19, Abrego Garcia's lawyers moved to have the case dismissed on the basis of "selective or vindictive prosecution". They alleged that he was being prosecuted as punishment for his civil case challenging his removal to El Salvador, and in an attempt to shift how the public views his deportation. They further alleged that the prosecution stemmed from the government's desire to avoid "the embarrassment of accepting responsibility for its unlawful conduct." The lawyers noted that Hernandez-Reyes, a key witness against Abrego Garcia "is a convicted leader of a human smuggling business who has three other felony convictions and was deported five times," and that, despite this, the government arranged for early release from the sentence he was serving and for work authorization, "all as an inducement to cooperate against Mr. Abrego, an alleged subordinate".

Abrego Garcia was released from prison in Tennessee on August 22, and returned to Maryland. ICE officials said that they would place him in immigration detention as soon as possible, and would initiate proceedings to deport him to a third country. The next day, Abrego Garcia's lawyers supplemented their motion for dismissal, stating that the government was trying to get him to plead guilty to the charges by threatening to deport him to Uganda, but saying that it would instead deport him to Costa Rica if he pleaded guilty to his charges and first served a sentence. The motion said that "the DOJ, DHS, and ICE are using their collective powers" to force a choice between these options. Abrego Garcia's lawyers characterized deportation to Uganda as a rendition intended to punish him. They asserted that he would be exposed to potential persecution or torture, citing Uganda's documented human rights violations, and vowed to fight the rendition "tooth and nail". A State Department report on Uganda warns of arbitrary or unlawful killings, forced disappearance, and torture and cruel treatment or punishment.

On August 25, during a routine ICE check-in in Baltimore, Maryland that was part of his release conditions, Abrego Garcia was detained, and he was then transferred to an ICE detention center in Farmville, Virginia. Shortly after, the Department of Homeland Security announced on X that Garcia "will be processed for removal to Uganda". The same day, his legal counsel announced that they filed for a writ of habeas corpus in the United States District Court for the District of Maryland to prevent his deportation before the immigration proceedings concluded. This case was also assigned to Judge Xinis, who ordered officials to keep Abrego Garcia in the United States while she considers the lawsuit. She scheduled an evidentiary hearing for October 6, and ordered that in the meantime he must remain within 200 miles of her court in Greenbelt, Maryland, to enable him to confer with his lawyers.

Abrego Garcia's lawyers told Xinis that he had submitted a new asylum application. He was eligible to reapply because he had recently reentered the U.S. (Refugees have one year after reentry to apply for asylum.) The asylum application was to be assessed in an immigration court rather than by Xinis.

On September 5, the Trump administration informed Abrego Garcia that it would send him not to Uganda but to Eswatini.

On September 26, Abrego Garcia was transferred from the Farmville, Virginia detention center to the Moshannon Valley Processing Center in Philipsburg, Pennsylvania.

On October 1, a US immigration judge in Baltimore rejected the asylum application, leaving Abrego Garcia with the option of appealing to the Board of Immigration Appeals.

On October 3, regarding Abrego Garcia's motion to dismiss his indictment on the grounds of "vindictive and selective prosecution", Judge Crenshaw said that there was a "realistic likelihood" of the prosecution being a vindictive act of retaliation for Abrego Garcia's initial lawsuit about his deportation. Crenshaw said the parties could proceed with discovery, and there would be an evidentiary hearing on the matter to enable the court to consider the issue.

On October 24, the Trump administration stated in a court filing that it planned to send Abrego Garcia to Liberia within as little as one week, asserting that the government had cleared the final legal hurdles to his removal and presenting the plan as part of its broader third-country removal efforts.

On November 14, the government told the court that Costa Rica – Abrego Garcia's preferred destination – "refuses to accept him". However, on November 21, The Washington Post reported that, according to Costa Rican Minister of Public Security Mario Zamora Cordero, Costa Rica remained willing to accept him on humanitarian grounds. Abrego Garcia's lawyers then told the court that the U.S. government's evident lie was "unmistakable proof of continued vindictiveness" toward Abrego Garcia.

A December 3 order from Judge Crenshaw, unsealed a few weeks later, revealed that it was only after Abrego Garcia had been removed from and returned to the United States that the Justice Department claimed it was important to indict him.

On December 11, Maryland-based federal judge Paula Xinis granted Abrego Garcia his habeas petition and ordered him released from custody. He was released that evening. He said (as interpreted into English): "I stand before you a free man and I want you to remember me this way, with my head held up high. ... I will continue to fight and stand firm against all of the injustices this government has done upon me. Regardless of this administration, I believe this is a country of laws and I believe that this injustice will come to an end." The next morning, Judge Xinis granted a temporary restraining order to block authorities from detaining him again. On March 20, 2026, the government claimed that not deporting Abrego Garcia to Liberia would "cast doubt on the diplomatic reliability of the United States" and asked Judge Xinis to dissolve her injunction by April 17.

On February 17, 2026, Judge Xinis ruled that ICE could not re-detain Abrego Garcia because "there is no 'good reason to believe' removal is likely in the reasonably foreseeable future" and DHS officials "have done nothing to show that Abrego Garcia's continued detention in ICE custody is consistent with due process."

On February 26, Abrego Garcia appeared in court, asking Judge Crenshaw to throw out the human smuggling charges. In April, U.S. Attorney General Pam Bondi was fired and Todd Blanche took over her role. Abrego Garcia's lawyers asked Judge Crenshaw to consider Blanche's public comments from June 2025; Blanche had said it was only after Judge Xinis accused officials of wrongdoing with respect to Abrego Garcia that the Justice Department began probing him. Crenshaw dismissed the criminal case against Abrego Garcia on May 22, agreeing with Abrego Garcia's argument that the DOJ had engaged in vindictive and selective prosecution and saying that absent Abrego Garcia's "successful lawsuit challenging his removal to El Salvador, the government would not have brought this prosecution". On June 22, the Department of Justice appealed the judge's dismissal of the criminal human smuggling case. On August 17, the DOJ filed in the Sixth Circuit Court of Appeals asking that criminal charges against García be reinstated.

== Trump administration media interaction ==
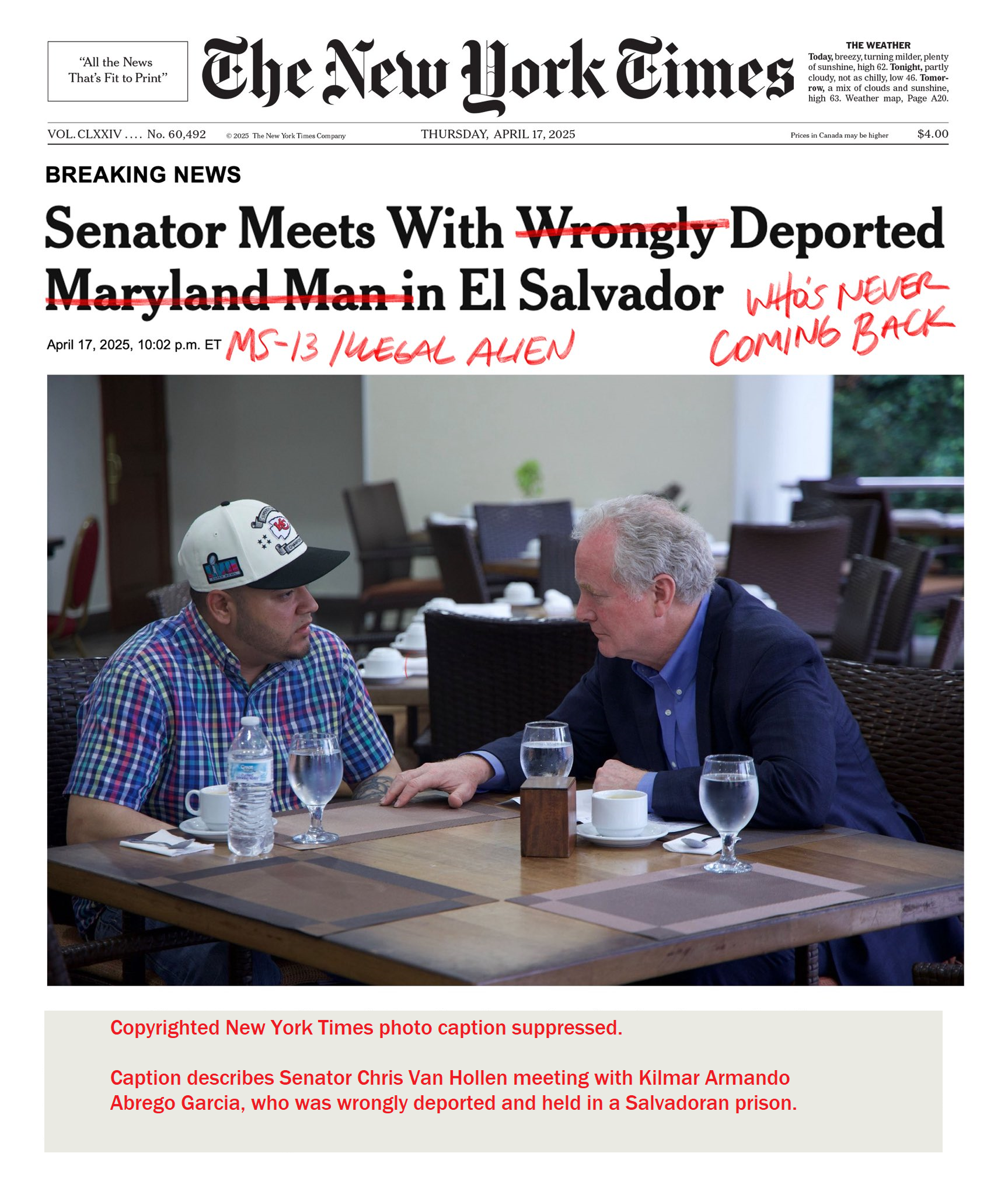
A publication by the White House official Twitter account. While the Trump administration maintained that it was complying with the Supreme Court order to facilitate Abrego Garcia's return, it simultaneously sought to convince the public that it did not have to.

The Trump administration initially called Abrego Garcia's deportation a mistake, and on April 11, 2025, the day after the Supreme Court's order to facilitate his return, Trump said "If the Supreme Court said bring somebody back I would do that. I respect the Supreme Court." Three days later he was reminded of his promise, and answered: "Why don't you just say, 'Isn't it wonderful that we're keeping criminals out of our country?'" and insulted the network asking the question. After insisting their error could not be undone, the administration switched to insisting that no error had been made at all. Calling Abrego Garcia a terrorist and gang member who was rightly sent away, and maintaining almost daily that he would never touch American soil again, the administration worked vigorously to sour the public against him. Trump acknowledged he could but would not return Abrego Garcia in an ABC News interview that aired April 29. "You could get him back. There's a phone on this desk," interviewer Terry Moran said. "I could," Trump replied, adding that if Abrego Garcia "were the gentleman that you [Moran] say he is, I would do that. But he is not."

According to the administration, the Supreme Court's requirement to "facilitate" his release and return did not mean the government had to take any steps to get him back, other than let him in if El Salvador chose to release him. Attorney General Pam Bondi said in the April 14 Oval Office meeting with President Bukele, "If they want to return him, we would facilitate it, meaning provide a plane. That's up for El Salvador if they want to return him. That's not up to us," while Trump maintained he was powerless to facilitate Abrego Garcia's return, as he was in Bukele's custody. Politico called this "a clear legal play" and sidestepping court orders, and noted it as unusual behavior for Trump, who prides himself on strong-arming world leaders.

The same day, White House Deputy Chief of Staff and Homeland Security Advisor Stephen Miller said "He was not mistakenly sent to El Salvador" and "This was the right person sent to the right place," contradicting both the Supreme Court's decision that Abrego Garcia's deportation was illegal and the administration's previous statements that the deportation was an administrative error.

Miller said that acknowledgment of the error came from "a DOJ lawyer who has since been relieved of duty, a saboteur, a Democrat," although NBC News noted that Solicitor General Dean John Sauer had also referred to it as an "administrative error" in a filing to the Supreme Court, as had top ICE officer Robert Cerna in a sworn declaration, and White House press secretary Karoline Leavitt, who called it a "clerical error".

Miller also said that if Bukele were to return Abrego Garcia, he would be deported again, a view Leavitt concurred with, saying that "Deporting him back to El Salvador was always going to be the result" and that there was no scenario in which he would end up living a peaceful life in the United States. Leavitt accused Abrego Garcia of being a foreign terrorist, gang member, and human trafficker gone back to his home country to face the consequences, adding "I'm not sure what is so difficult about this for everyone in the media to understand."

DHS spokesperson Tricia McLaughlin objected to what she described as the characterization of Abrego Garcia as a "media darling" and "just some Maryland father," saying: "Well, Osama bin Laden was also a father, and yet he wasn't a good guy, and they actually are both terrorists."

On April 16, Bondi said Abrego Garcia "is not coming back to our country. ... There was no situation ever where he was going to stay in this country." Others representing the administration made similar statements. On April 18, in response to a New York Times front-page headline reading "Senator Meets With Wrongly Deported Maryland Man in El Salvador", the White House tweeted an image of the front page with several edits in red ink: the word "Wrongly" was crossed out, the words "Maryland Man" were crossed out and replaced with "MS-13 Illegal Alien", and the words "Who's Never Coming Back" were added at the end. The tweet also said "Oh, and by the way, @ChrisVanHollen – he's NOT coming back."

Leavitt told reporters "Foreign terrorists do not have legal protections in the United States of America anymore". She alleged that Abrego Garcia was a leader within MS-13 and had been involved in human trafficking, adding "There's a lot of evidence, and the Department of Homeland Security and ICE have that evidence, and I saw it this morning." She did not elaborate on what she saw. Vice President JD Vance publicly backed the deportation. Regarding the claim that Abrego Garcia was not a gang member, Bondi said in an interview that "We have to rely on what ICE says. We have to rely on what Homeland Security says." White House Senior Director of Counterterrorism Sebastian Gorka suggested that opposing Abrego Garcia's deportation was illegal, asking if it was aiding and abetting criminals and terrorists.

The Trump administration also presented documents and press releases from the DHS that intended to show Abrego Garcia "as a [MS-13] gang member with a violent history". The documents included information related to the 2019 arrest and immigration hearings, a copy of a civil restraining order against Abrego Garcia filed by his wife in 2021, and information related to a 2022 traffic stop. This was part of "aggressively building a case against the native Salvadoran [...] designed to combat an onslaught of criticism from Democrats and intensifying scrutiny from the courts". The DOJ also released two documents from 2019 that allegedly tied him to the MS-13 criminal gang, including a detective's summary of statements from a confidential informant whom the detective described as a "past proven and reliable source of information".

In the restraining order, Abrego Garcia's wife accused him of "punching and scratching her, ripping her shirt, and leaving her bruised". The DHS said "Kilmar Abrego Garcia had a history of violence and was not the upstanding 'Maryland Man' the media has portrayed him as."

In response, Vasquez Sura said:

After surviving domestic violence in a previous relationship, I acted out of caution after a disagreement with Kilmar by seeking a civil protective order in case things escalated. [...] Things did not escalate, and I decided not to follow through with the civil court process. We were able to work through this situation privately as a family, including by going to counseling. Our marriage only grew stronger in the years that followed. No one is perfect, and no marriage is perfect. That is not a justification for ICE's action of abducting him and deporting him to a country where he was supposed to be protected from deportation. Kilmar has always been a loving partner and father, and I will continue to stand by him and demand justice for him.

The DHS did not redact Vasquez Sura's home address when it posted the copy of the restraining order, and she and her children subsequently moved into a safe house, as she was concerned that they were no longer safe living in their home.

On May 8, Kristi Noem testified before a Senate appropriations subcommittee that Abrego Garcia "should never have been in this country and will not be coming back to this country". When reminded that the Supreme Court required her to facilitate his return, she said that would be "up to the president of the El Salvador".

President Trump disclaimed responsibility. On April 17, asked if he would bring back Abrego Garcia, Trump said that he was "not involved in it ... you'll have to speak to the lawyers". In an April 22 interview, he repeated that he had left the decision to the DOJ. "I give them no instructions. ... I don't make that decision." He said that he had not asked Bukele to release Abrego Garcia because "I haven't been asked to ask him by my attorneys." In his April 29 interview with Moran, Trump again said "I'm not the one making this decision. We have lawyers that don't want to do this."

When Moran told Trump "in our country even bad guys get due process," he replied "If people come into our country illegally there's a different standard." Pressed with "but they get due process," he said "Well, they get a process where we have to get 'em out, yeah." On May 4, Trump was interviewed on Meet the Press by Kristen Welker, who revisited whether he had the power to bring Abrego Garcia back to the U.S. He responded that if he were "instructed by the attorney general that it's legal to do so", he could ask Bukele, but the decision was up to Bukele. When asked whether he agreed with the secretary of state that everyone deserves due process, regardless of whether they are citizens or non-citizens, Trump said that he did not know, as he was not a lawyer. Welker then noted that the Fifth Amendment says that everyone has due process rights, and asked "don't you need to uphold the Constitution of the United States as president?", to which Trump again replied "I don't know."

Trump also wrote in an April 22 Truth Social post that "We cannot give everyone a trial", claiming that holding a trial for everyone the administration wishes to deport would take 200 years and was not possible. The Hill wrote that this appeared to partly be a response to critics arguing due process violations, particularly Abrego Garcia's. Miller said on May 9 that the administration was actively looking at suspending habeas corpus, the right to defend against arbitrary arrest and detention by challenging the legality of one's imprisonment in court. He said "a lot of it depends on whether the courts do the right thing or not."

Roger Parloff of Lawfare argued that even in the legal cases, the Trump administration's primary goal is "political messaging".

=== False and misleading information ===
A number of news organizations have said that members of the Trump administration have lied and misrepresented facts and the law to the public regarding Abrego Garcia's deportation and detention.

The Austin American-Statesman found JD Vance's claim that Abrego Garcia was a "convicted MS-13 gang member" to be false because Garcia has neither been charged with nor convicted of any crime.

The New Republic said that JD Vance lied in calling Abrego Garcia a gang member and insisting that he could not be returned to the U.S. Vance asked "Are you proposing that we invade El Salvador to retrieve a gang member with no legal right to be in our country? Where in the Supreme Court's decision does it require us to do that?", and musician and writer Mikel Jollet responded "No, the ruling states clearly that you are required to take steps to facilitate his return and update the court on your progress. You have plenty of tools at your disposal (diplomatic and otherwise) to do this without invading El Salvador." In another article, The New Republic said that the Trump administration was lying when it said that the United States could do nothing to effectuate the return of Abrego Garcia, as the United States has a "contractual arrangement under which we pay El Salvador about $6 million—or $20,000 per detainee per year", and "Like any other good customer, the United States can easily negotiate the adjustment."

PolitiFact found Trump "misleadingly glosses over critical details that tell a different story" and "omitted the central point that Abrego Garcia's family, legal team and advocates say is at issue: He was deported without due process." Stephen Miller tweeted that "The right of 'due process' is to protect citizens from their government, not to protect foreign trespassers from removal", adding that "an illegal alien facing deportation" does not have due process rights. Aaron Reichlin-Melnick, a senior fellow with the American Immigration Council, responded that Miller was "lying", as the Supreme Court has repeatedly ruled that "every person gets due process", and quoted former justice Antonin Scalia as substantiation: "It is well established that the Fifth Amendment entitles aliens to due process of law in deportation proceedings."

Abrego Garcia had largely based his defense on the fact that no court had issued a Title 8 order of removal. The government did not dispute this. Instead, it argued that the October 10, 2019, withholding decision implied an order of removal. Judge Xinis ruled on December 11 that "it is simply not an order of removal" and that "long-established precedent ... commands against collapsing two legally distinct orders—removal and withholding of removal—into one."

=== Tattoos ===
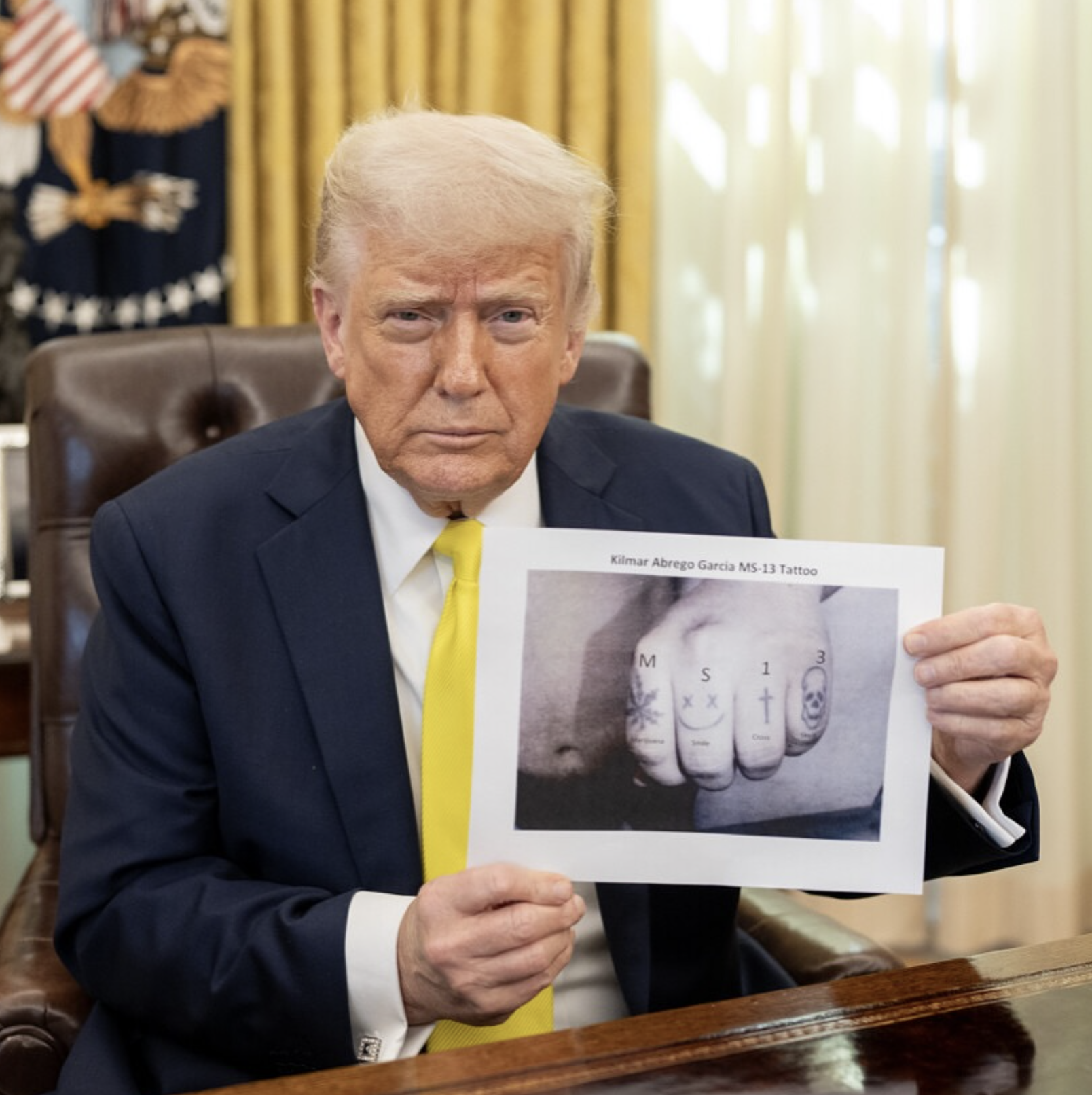
Trump holding a photograph of the tattoos on Abrego Garcia's knuckles, digitally altered to add "M" "S" "1" "3" above, and a descriptive word below each symbol. Trump later falsely said the photo was unaltered, and the visual aids were real tattoos. PolitiFact reported that the symbols are not known signifiers of MS-13.

On April 18, Donald Trump posted a photo on Truth Social of Abrego Garcia's hand, featuring four tattoos allegedly meant to symbolize MS-13: a marijuana leaf, a smiley face, a cross, and a skull. Terrance Cole, Trump's nominee for the 12th administrator of the Drug Enforcement Administration, also said in his Senate confirmation head that these were associated with MS-13. Experts who spoke to BBC Verify disagreed. A White House spokesperson told PolitiFact that any law enforcement or immigration official with on-the-ground experience could link the tattooed symbols to MS-13. PolitiFact concluded that "Experts in MS-13 and other gangs say the pictorial tattoos shown are not typical designs for MS-13 or other gangs." In his July 23 ruling to release Abrego Garcia, Judge Crenshaw made note of the government's "poor attempts to tie Abrego to MS-13", in particular that there was no evidence for "markings or tattoos showing gang affiliation," which the New York Times described as directly undercutting the administration's statements.

The April 18 photo was digitally altered to add the characters "M" "S" "1" "3" above the symbols and one-word descriptions below. In an ABC News interview with Terry Moran that aired on April 29, Trump falsely insisted that the characters themselves were tattooed on Abrego Garcia's knuckles, saying "He had 'M,' 'S' as clear as you can be" and "[He's] got 'MS-13' on his knuckles", and objected to Moran correcting him that those characters were photoshopped. Trump's Truth Social post also said in part "They said he is not a member of MS-13, even though he's got MS-13 tattooed onto his knuckles ..."

Homeland Security Secretary Kristi Noem said she did not have any knowledge of the photo when asked whether the photo was "doctored or not doctored" in a congressional hearing.

== Legal implications regarding US citizens ==
In response to the government's argument that facilitating Abrego Garcia's return was beyond its scope of responsibility, as he was in Salvadoran custody, US judges have noted that the legal issue is not limited to Abrego Garcia's deportation. In her April 5 opinion, US District Court Judge Xinis said:

[The defendants] cling to the stunning proposition that they can forcibly remove any person – migrant and U.S. citizen alike – to prisons outside the United States, and then baldly assert they have no way to effectuate return because they are no longer the "custodian", and the Court thus lacks jurisdiction. As a practical matter, the facts say otherwise.

The Fourth Circuit Court of Appeals held a similar opinion, noting that the administration's arguments, if taken to their logical ends, could lead to the deportation of citizens without any option for remedy. In its April 17 ruling that referenced Trump's comments suggesting doing so, the court wrote:

If today the Executive claims the right to deport without due process and in disregard of court orders, what assurance will there be tomorrow that it will not deport American citizens and then disclaim responsibility to bring them home? And what assurance shall there be that the Executive will not train its broad discretionary powers upon its political enemies?

Supreme Court Justice Sotomayor made a similar observation in her April 10 concurrence:

The Government's argument, moreover, implies that it could deport and incarcerate any person, including U. S. citizens, without legal consequence, so long as it does so before a court can intervene.

== Reactions ==
The U.S. government's acknowledgment of the deportation error sparked significant legal and political debate, raising concerns about the efficacy and fairness of US immigration laws and procedures. The Atlantic reports that the standard course for the government to deport someone with protected status would be to reopen the case and introduce new evidence arguing for deportation.

On April 15, Jennifer Vasquez Sura, Abrego Garcia's wife, pleaded for the return of her husband outside of the Maryland courthouse that was holding a status hearing on his case:

My family can't be robbed of another day without seeing Kilmar. This administration has already taken so much from my children, from his mother, brother, sisters and me. [...] Kilmar, if you can hear me, stay strong. God hasn't forgotten about you. [...] Our children are asking when will you come home. I pray for the day I tell them the time and date that you will return.

=== Members of Congress ===
Politico reported that Abrego Garcia's deportation had become a political flashpoint, with Democratic lawmakers viewing the administration's refusal to return him despite the Supreme Court ruling as the constitutional crisis they have been warning of, and Republicans, with the support of the administration, seeking to move away from the litigation to make the issue about illegal immigration, an issue they believe is to their favor.

Several congressional Democrats called for Abrego Garcia's release. Representative Adriano Espaillat of New York said in a press conference that he would write to the president of El Salvador to formally ask for Abrego Garcia's release and to know his condition, and that he hoped to visit the Terrorism Confinement Center. He noted that Abrego Garcia had been jailed without the presentation of any criminal charges in either the United States or in El Salvador.

Senator Chris Van Hollen of Maryland connected Abrego Garcia to deportations under Trump more broadly, speaking of "people being disappeared" in America, including visiting students and legal immigrants.

In anticipation of President Bukele's visit to the U.S., Representative Joaquin Castro of Texas called for Bukele to be held accountable for the imprisonment of Abrego Garcia and others in what Castro called "gulags" and "torture prisons".

On April 14, Senator Jeanne Shaheen, the ranking Democrat on the Senate Committee on Foreign Relations, said that the administration was required by law to provide the committee with "any written agreements made with the Salvadoran government on this issue", and requested immediate compliance with the law.

The Congressional Hispanic Caucus, which is composed of Democrats, also called for Abrego Garcia's release.

Republican congressman Jason Smith toured CECOT, as did Republican Congressman Riley Moore, who was photographed giving a double thumbs-up in front of a cell of prisoners. When asked about the issue at a town hall with constituents on April 15, Republican senator Chuck Grassley said:

Well, it's not a question of the president following the court order. It's a question of is the president of El Salvador going to do what our Supreme Court wants done? And obviously our Supreme Court doesn't have any control over him, and he says he's not going to return him. So if there's a constitutional crisis, it's not being caused by President Trump, it's being caused by the president of El Salvador. [...] I would expect our president to act in good faith, and I think our president will do that, of making those requests of the president of El Salvador, but whether or not, but how the president of El Salvador responds would be up to that president of El Salvador.

Republican House Majority Whip Tom Emmer said in an interview that Abrego Garcia did have due process, in the form of the asylum hearing where his application was rejected. Pressed on the 2019 hearing that granted Abrego Garcia the ability to stay in the U.S., and his protection order not to be deported specifically to El Salvador, Emmer dodged. He disclaimed US responsibility for "a citizen of El Salvador who is now in El Salvador".

Republican senator John Kennedy of Louisiana said, "The administration won't admit it. But this was a screw-up".

=== State officials ===
Democratic governor of Illinois JB Pritzker took steps to have his state boycott El Salvador over Abrego Garcia's imprisonment, directing various Illinois pension funds to review whether they have investments in companies based in the country, and the Department of Central Management Services to review whether the state has granted procurement contracts to companies based in or controlled by El Salvador. He declared that due process was guaranteed by the U.S. Constitution, and Trump's eroding of fundamental constitutional rights had to be fought to restore the balance of power. In response to Trump's remarks to President Bukele that "Home-growns are next" and that Bukele needed to build more prisons, Pritzker warned that "if they get away with it now, they'll do it to anyone."

Democratic governor of Maryland Wes Moore condemned the deportation on the grounds of inadequate due process.

=== Trade unions ===
Abrego Garcia's deportation resulted in significant public activism from both his local union, the International Association of Sheet Metal, Air, Rail and Transportation Workers (SMART) Local 100, and the SMART International Union. SMART general president Michael Coleman said the following in response to his deportation:

In his pursuit of the life promised by the American dream, Brother Kilmar was literally helping to build this great country. What did he get in return? Arrest and deportation to a nation whose prisons face outcry from human rights organizations. SMART condemns his treatment in the strongest possible terms, and we demand his rightful return.

=== Grassroots organizations ===
The Maryland-based immigrant services and advocacy organization CASA was deeply involved in advocating for Abrego Garcia's return to the U.S. Abrego Garcia is a member of CASA. The organization mobilized community support, organized rallies, launched petitions, and facilitated meetings between Garcia's family and lawmakers. CASA's legal team also played a direct role in the litigation, with one of its advocates serving as co-counsel for Garcia's wife, Jennifer Vasquez Sura.

=== Media commentators ===
In the April 14 segment of The Daily Show, Jon Stewart commented on Bukele's visit with Trump earlier in the day, where the presidents had spoken about Abrego Garcia remaining at CECOT rather than being returned to the U.S.:

Can I honestly tell you? Like, they're fucking enjoying this, like the two of them: our president, their president, [they're like], "I can't do it. I guess we'll just have to let him rot in fucking prison, even though he didn't deserve to be there." [...] I know [Trump and Bukele] don't care about this guy [...] but somebody else cares about this person, and you just randomly, with no evidence that you'll show anybody, call him a terrorist.

Andrea Pitzer, journalist and author of a history of concentration camps, wrote on New York magazine's Intelligencer website that CECOT is a concentration camp, akin to the Soviet Gulag and the early Nazi concentration camps (as distinct from the extermination camps). Her criteria were detaining civilians en masse without due process on basis of race, ethnicity, or supposed affiliation, as opposed to crimes; political ends to gather and keep power; typically open-ended detention so that a prison sentence, if any, may be honored or it may not; and an end run around the legal system, allowing detention not otherwise possible. Pitzer argued that Bukele's, and now Trump's, use of CECOT in their security theater met all of these criteria. She warned that those who open concentration camps seldom close them willingly; instead, extrajudicial detention can linger for decades and tends to expand its role, just as Auschwitz was a regular concentration camp for years before Birkenau was built, and Guantanamo Bay was an immigration detention facility to prevent refugees from getting asylum on American soil decades before it became a site for torture and indefinite detention.

In an opinion column for the Chicago Tribune, Elizabeth Shackelford similarly wrote that CECOT is not a prison but a concentration camp, since prisons hold people lawfully convicted of crimes and serving sentences, whereas concentration camps are intended to confine people "without legal justification or limits" and "to break men's spirits and instill fear outside its walls." She pointed out that authoritarians often "hone tools of oppression against unpopular populations" before using them against whoever they want, and argued that Trump's attack on due process is a threat that the Founding Fathers recognized, analogizing the case to one of the items they listed as a grievance against King George III in the US Declaration of Independence: "transporting us beyond Seas to be tried for pretended offences".

After Trump agreed in an interview that he could call Bukele and ask him to release Abrego Garcia, Greg Sargent, an opinion columnist for The New Republic, wrote that the statement "destroys" the Trump administration's argument that it cannot "compel Bukele to release him because it would intrude on Salvadoran sovereignty to dictate that country's treatment of one of its own", in that a request would not intrude on sovereignty. Sargent also commented on Trump's response to a question about why he was not acting in accordance with the Supreme Court's April 10 order that the administration facilitate Abrego Garcia's return: "I'm not the one making this decision. We have lawyers that don't want to do this." Sargent said that this implies Trump is either "knowingly violating the Supreme Court and hiding behind his lawyers to do so", or the DOJ is "deceiving him about what the high court has ordered—revealing he's weak and subject to manipulation."

Media Matters for America argued that "right-wing media personalities" and news sources have often downplayed or rejected Abrego Garcia's due process rights.

=== Academics ===
Historian Timothy Snyder described the case as the "beginning of an American policy of state terror" against those living in the U.S. Snyder argued that this is a test of whether Americans will stand for the rule of law, both individually and by demanding that Congress do likewise.

Legal scholar Ryan Goodman and counterterrorism expert Thomas Joscelyn noted that the Trump administration acknowledged violating a judge's withholding of removal order, and that both the district court and the circuit court of appeals have ruled that the administration violated Abrego Garcia's right to due process. Goodman and Joscelyn added that not only was the administration "openly flouting" the Supreme Court's order that it facilitate Abrego Garcia's release, but the administration claimed that it could not do so, and mocked the idea of his return. They argued that despite the government's efforts to focus the public's attention on Abrego Garcia's alleged ties to MS-13, the case "is about the rule of law, not allegations about Abrego Garcia's gang membership", especially "the Trump administration's defiance of the courts and denial of due process – a most basic constitutional right."

In response to the Trump administration's brief to the Supreme Court, where the solicitor general argued that no court can order the administration to seek Abrego Garcia's return, legal scholars Erwin Chemerinsky and Laurence Tribe wrote that it "is using this case to establish a truly chilling proposition: that no one can stop the Trump administration from imprisoning any people it wants anywhere else in the world", and called that both "lawless" and "frightening".

=== Public opinion ===
In a New York Times / Sienna College poll of registered voters in April 2025, 52% disapproved of Trump's handling of the case, compared to 31% who approved. In a Washington Post / ABC News / Ipsos poll of US adults published the same day, 42% thought that the government should bring Abrego Garcia back to the U.S., 26% thought that he should remain imprisoned in El Salvador, and 31% said that they did not know enough to answer.

== See also ==
- Deportation in the second presidency of Donald Trump
- Deaths, detentions and deportations of American citizens in the second Trump administration
