= Robert Bruce King =

American judge (born 1940)

Robert King
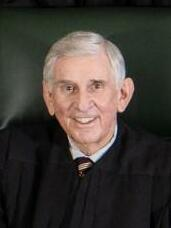
- King in 2022

Judge of the United States Court of Appeals for the Fourth Circuit
- Incumbent
- Assumed office October 9, 1998
- Appointed by: Bill Clinton
- Preceded by: Kenneth Keller Hall

United States Attorney for the Southern District of West Virginia
- In office 1977–1981
- President: Jimmy Carter

Personal details
- Born: Robert Bruce King; January 29, 1940 (age 86) White Sulphur Springs, West Virginia, U.S.
- Party: Democratic
- Education: West Virginia University (BA, JD)

Robert Bruce King (born January 29, 1940) is an American jurist who has served as a United States circuit judge of the United States Court of Appeals for the Fourth Circuit since 1998. He was previously the United States Attorney for the Southern District of West Virginia from 1977 to 1981.

== Early life and education ==
King was born in 1940 in White Sulphur Springs, West Virginia. His father died when King was only ten, leaving his mother, Gladys, a widow at thirty-one. Gladys raised King and his two siblings while working in a kitchen at The Greenbrier resort, all the while instilling in them the importance of hard work and education. King and his sister would later endow a scholarship at West Virginia University in honor of their mother's dedication to her children and their education.

After receiving his Bachelor of Arts degree from West Virginia University in 1961, King entered active duty in the United States Air Force and served as an officer in the Office of Special Investigations. After his discharge in 1964, he returned to Greenbrier County to work as a teacher. While teaching, he met his future wife, a fellow teacher named Julia Kay Doak, and the two wed in April 1965. The following year, King enrolled at West Virginia University College of Law, where he was a member of the West Virginia Law Review and president of the Student Bar Association. He graduated Order of the Coif in 1968.

== Professional career ==
King began his legal career as a law clerk in Charleston for Judge John A. Field, Jr. on the Southern District of West Virginia. After clerking, King joined the firm Haynes & Ford in Lewisburg. He returned to Charleston in 1970 to serve as an Assistant United States Attorney in the Southern District of West Virginia, where he stayed until 1974. One of King's most significant prosecutions during this time involved the bribing of a juror in the 1968 trial of former West Virginia Governor William Wallace Barron and some of his associates, who faced corruption charges. The jury foreperson confessed to accepting a bribe for acquittals, and Governor Barron subsequently pled guilty, received a twelve-year prison sentence, and became a government witness in the trials of two other people implicated in the bribery. As an Assistant U.S. Attorney, King also prosecuted five Logan County officials on civil rights charges relating to electoral fraud.

In 1974, King returned to private practice at Spilman, Thomas, Battle & Klostermeyer in Charleston and became a partner in 1975. While at the Spilman firm, King served on the West Virginia State Bar's Committee on Legal Ethics. He investigated alleged ethical violations by lawyers and represented the committee in proceedings before the Supreme Court of Appeals of West Virginia.

In 1977, at the recommendation of West Virginia Senator Robert Byrd, President Carter appointed King U.S. Attorney for the Southern District of West Virginia. As U.S. Attorney, King took on high-profile white-collar crime and public corruption cases. His investigation into the liquor industry and Alcohol Beverage Control Commission of West Virginia resulted in the conviction of more than forty individuals and corporations on charges including commercial bribery, mail fraud, extortion, and RICO violations.

In 1981, King returned to private practice and helped found the law firm King Betts & Allen (now Allen Guthrie McHugh & Thomas). He was a managing partner from 1981 to 1993 and from 1997 until his judicial appointment in 1998. During his thirty years of practice, King tried over 120 cases and argued many appeals. As a federal prosecutor, he prosecuted defendants in cases involving public corruption, electoral fraud, organized crime, and many other crimes. In private practice, he also handled many criminal cases as well as civil cases ranging from wrongful death, personal injury, products liability, professional malpractice, and civil rights. Reflecting on King's record, Judge M. Blane Michael of the Fourth Circuit remarked that “there was little that Judge King had not done in the practice of law by the time he became a judge."

== Federal judicial service ==
President Bill Clinton nominated King to the United States Court of Appeals for the Fourth Circuit on June 24, 1998, after Judge Kenneth Keller Hall assumed senior status. “It’s the utmost compliment to be recommended and supported by Senator Byrd and Senator Rockefeller,” said King to the Charleston Gazette, “[a]nd the expression of support by President Clinton is the greatest honor of my life.” At the Senate Judiciary Committee’s hearing on September 9, 1998, Senator Byrd praised King’s “deep-seated integrity, strong work ethic, and love of public service.” He also compared King to Alexander the Great, who, when presented with an indictment, would “put one hand over one ear and keep that ear closed” to ensure both sides would have an equal opportunity to present their case. “I believe that Bob King will be the same [kind of judge],” said Byrd. The United States Senate unanimously confirmed King to the Fourth Circuit on October 8, 1998, and he received his commission the next day.

In August 2021, King announced plans to assume senior status upon the confirmation of a successor. However, in November, he formally withdrew his August letter and announced he would continue on as an active member of the Fourth Circuit. Reports surfaced that judge King preferred former U.S. Senator Carte Goodwin to be nominated to replace him, while the White House preferred J. Jeaneen Legato, a personal injury lawyer from Charleston.

=== Notable cases ===
On April 7, 2025, King was one of a panel of three judges to order the government to return Kilmar Abrego Garcia, a man who was erroneously deported to El Salvador, back to the United States.

Legal offices
Preceded by Kenneth Keller Hall	Judge of the United States Court of Appeals for the Fourth Circuit; 1998–present	Incumbent
