= Joseph Sellers Jr. =

Former President of the SMART Labor Union

Joseph Sellers Jr. is a former American labor union leader.

Sellers grew up in Philadelphia, and followed his father in becoming a sheet metal worker. In 1980, he joined the Sheet Metal Workers International Association. He was elected to the executive of his local union in 1994, and as its president and business manager in 2002.

In 2009, Sellers was elected as a vice-president of the union. In 2011, the union merged into the new International Association of Sheet Metal, Air, Rail and Transportation Workers, and Sellers became its general secretary-treasurer. In 2015, he was elected as president of the union. He also became a vice-president of the AFL-CIO.

As leader of the union, Sellers founded the Belonging and Excellence for All initiative, introduced campaigns on mental health and substance abuse in workplaces, and moved the union's pension fund to a strong position. He retired in 2023.

Trade union offices
Preceded by Union founded	Secretary-Treasurer of the International Association of Sheet Metal, Air, Rail and Transportation Workers; 2015–2023	Succeeded by Richard McClees
Preceded by Joseph Nigro	President of the International Association of Sheet Metal, Air, Rail and Transportation Workers; 2015–2023	Succeeded by Michael Coleman
