= Michael Coleman (unionist) =

American trade union leader

Michael Coleman is an American labor union leader.

Coleman was a sheet metal worker in Cleveland, and joined the Sheet Metal Workers’ International Association in 1985. He held various positions in his local union, before becoming its president and business manager in 2012. By this point, the union had merged into the International Association of Sheet Metal, Air, Rail and Transportation Workers (SMART). As leader of the local union, he became known for innovative methods of organizing workers, providing more flexibility to them, and restructuring pension and benefit packages.

In 2019, Coleman was appointed as SMART's director of business and management relations, then he became assistant to the general president. In 2023, he succeeded as president of the union.

In 2025, Coleman advocated for SMART member Kilmar Abrego Garcia, who was deported by the Trump administration to a prison in El Salvador. Coleman stated, "Since last week, our demand has been a simple one — one that echoed the calls of Kilmar Armando Abrego Garcia’s family, community and allies: Bring Kilmar home and give him the due process that is his right."

Trade union offices
Preceded by Joseph Sellers Jr.	President of the International Association of Sheet Metal, Air, Rail and Transportation Workers; 2023–present	Succeeded by Incumbent
