= Joseph Nigro =

Joseph J. Nigro (April 27, 1950 – October 24, 2018) was an American labor union leader.

Born in Quincy, Massachusetts, Nigro became a sheet metal worker in Boston, and joined the Sheet Metal Workers' International Association. In 2011, he won election as general president of the international union. He also became a vice-president of the AFL-CIO.

As leader of the union, he completed a merger which formed the International Association of Sheet Metal, Air, Rail and Transportation Workers. He became the new union's founding president, but was in increasingly poor health and so retired in 2015. He died three years later.

Trade union offices
Preceded by Michael Sullivan	President of the Sheet Metal Workers International Association; 2011–2011	Succeeded by Union merged
Preceded by New position	President of the International Association of Sheet Metal, Air, Rail and Transportation Workers; 2011–2015	Succeeded by Joseph Sellers Jr.
