= Kenneth Keller Hall =

American judge (1918–1999)

Senior Judge of the United States Court of Appeals for the Fourth Circuit
- In office February 24, 1998 – July 8, 1999

Judge of the United States Court of Appeals for the Fourth Circuit
- In office September 3, 1976 – February 24, 1998
- Appointed by: Gerald Ford
- Preceded by: John A. Field Jr.
- Succeeded by: Robert Bruce King

Judge of the United States District Court for the Southern District of West Virginia
- In office December 6, 1971 – September 26, 1976
- Appointed by: Richard Nixon
- Preceded by: John A. Field Jr.
- Succeeded by: John Thomas Copenhaver Jr.

Personal details
- Born: Kenneth Keller Hall; February 24, 1918 Greenview, West Virginia
- Died: July 8, 1999 (aged 81) Charleston, West Virginia
- Spouse: Gerry Tabor
- Education: New River State (attended); Morris Harvey College (attended); West Virginia University College of Law (JD)

Military service
- Branch/service: United States Navy
- Service years: 1944–1946
- Rank: Lieutenant
- Conflict: World War II

Kenneth Keller "K.K." Hall (February 24, 1918 – July 8, 1999) was a United States circuit judge of the United States Court of Appeals for the Fourth Circuit and was previously a United States district judge of the United States District Court for the Southern District of West Virginia.

== Education and career ==
Born in Greenview, West Virginia. He graduated from Scott High School, where he was the captain of the football team. He attended New River State College and Morris Harvey College. He moved to Washington, D.C. and worked a government employee in civil service. He served in the United States Naval Reserve during the World War II era, from 1942 to 1945 and was discharged as a lieutenant. He received a Juris Doctor from West Virginia University College of Law in 1948, and was in private practice in Madison, West Virginia from 1948 to 1953, also serving as Mayor of Madison from 1949 to 1952. He was a judge of the West Virginia 25th Judicial Circuit in Madison from 1953 to 1969, returning to private practice there from 1969 to 1970. He was a Hearing Examiner for the Bureau of Hearings and Appeals of the Social Security Administration in Charleston, West Virginia from 1970 to 1971.

== Federal judicial service ==
Hall was nominated by President Richard Nixon on November 22, 1971, to a seat on the United States District Court for the Southern District of West Virginia vacated by Judge John A. Field Jr. This was at the recommendation of Democratic Senator Robert Byrd and over the objection of the Republican West Virginia governor, Arch A. Moore Jr., who preferred a Republican candidate, John Thomas Copenhaver Jr. According to Moore biographer Brad Crouser, "Byrd normally was a guest in Judge Hall's home when he ran for congress and thereafter, and it was pay-back time." Nixon, Crouser writes, "apparently felt he needed Byrd's vote in the Senate more than the allegiance of the West Virginia GOP, Arch Moore included."

He was confirmed by the United States Senate on December 1, 1971, and received his commission on December 6, 1971. His service was terminated on September 26, 1976, due to elevation to the Fourth Circuit.

Hall was nominated by President Gerald Ford on August 26, 1976, to a seat on the United States Court of Appeals for the Fourth Circuit vacated by Judge John A. Field Jr. He was confirmed by the Senate on September 1, 1976, and received his commission on September 3, 1976. He assumed senior status on February 24, 1998. His service was terminated on July 8, 1999, due to his death in Charleston.

== Sources ==
Legal offices
Preceded by John A. Field Jr.	Judge of the United States District Court for the Southern District of West Virginia; 1971–1976	Succeeded by John Thomas Copenhaver Jr.
Preceded by John A. Field Jr.	Judge of the United States Court of Appeals for the Fourth Circuit; 1976–1998	Succeeded by Robert Bruce King
