= Greenview, West Virginia =

- Census-designated place
- Location within West Virginia Location within the United States
- Coordinates: 37°59′39″N 81°48′56″W
- Country: United States
- State: West Virginia
- County: Boone

Area
  - Total: 1.018 sq mi (2.64 km^{2})
  - Land: 0.986 sq mi (2.55 km^{2})
  - Water: 0.032 sq mi (0.083 km^{2})
- Elevation: 758 ft (231 m)

Population (2020)
  - Total: 333
  - Density: 338/sq mi (130/km^{2})
- Time zone: UTC-5 (Eastern (EST))
  - Summer (DST): UTC-4 (EDT)
- Area codes: 304 & 681
- GNIS feature ID: 1539721

Greenview is a census-designated place in Boone County, West Virginia, United States. Its population was 333 as of the 2020 census (down from 378 at the 2010 census).

== Notable person ==
- Kenneth Keller Hall, United States federal district and appellate judge
