= International Association of Sheet Metal, Air, Rail and Transportation Workers =

North American trade union

- Abbreviation: SMART
- Formation: 2011
- Merger of: Sheet Metal Workers' International Association; United Transportation Union
- Type: Trade union
- Headquarters: Washington, D.C., US
- Locations: Canada; United States
- Members: 230,000
- President: Michael Coleman
- Affiliations: AFL-CIO (North America's Building Trades Unions); Building and Wood Workers' International; Canadian Labour Congress
- Website: smart-union.org

The International Association of Sheet Metal, Air, Rail, and Transportation Workers (SMART) is a North American labor union headquartered in Washington, D.C., which was chartered by the AFL–CIO in 2013. The product of a merger between the Sheet Metal Workers' International Association (SMWIA) and the United Transportation Union (UTU), SMART represents over 230,000 sheet metal workers, service technicians, bus operators, engineers, conductors, sign workers, welders, and production employees, among others, throughout the United States, Puerto Rico, and Canada.

The Transportation Division (which has offices in Washington, D.C., and North Olmsted, Ohio) represents employees on Class I railroad, Amtrak, and regional and short line railroads; bus and mass transit employees on some 45 transit systems; and airline pilots, flight attendants, dispatchers and other airport personnel. The Division's 500 local unions organize conductors, brakemen, switch men, ground service personnel, locomotive engineers, hostlers, and railroad yard masters, as well as bus drivers and mechanics.

Members of SMART's Sheet Metal Division design, manufacture, and install their own products. Employed in a variety of occupations – from architectural sheet metal work, to fabricating, installing, and servicing HVAC systems, to shipbuilding and railroad work.

== SMWIA history ==
=== Early years, 1888–1896 ===
When the Tin, Sheet Iron, and Cornice Workers' International Association first organized in 1888. Union members from Dayton, Toledo, and Youngstown; Memphis; Omaha; Peoria; and Kansas City, Missouri, organized to "elevate" the trade, advance craftsmanship, and improve wages and conditions.

SMART endorsed Joe Biden for president in 2020.

== Structure of the union ==
The union is governed by three officers: a General President, a General Secretary Treasurer, and a SMART Transportation President. The union is governed by a 17-member General Executive Council. Eleven Vice Presidents on the council are elected from the sheet metal locals. Four individuals with the title "Vice President/International Representative and General Vice President", the National Legislative Director, and the President Transportation Division/General Vice President are elected from former UTU locals. Officer and council terms last for five years, with elections held at the general convention.

The union has two membership units, The Sheet Metal, and the Transportation Division. The Transportation Division encompasses the locals of the UTU, and the constitutional provisions governing the division are essentially those of the old UTU constitution. The two membership units have their own dues, governance structure, and operating procedures in addition to those prescribed by the SMART constitution.

== Presidents ==
2011: Joseph Nigro
2015: Joseph Sellers Jr.
2023: Michael Coleman
