= John A. Field Jr. =

American judge (1910–1995)

John Field
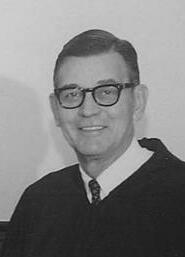
- Field in 1973

Judge of the United States Foreign Intelligence Surveillance Court of Review
- In office May 19, 1982 – May 18, 1989
- Appointed by: Warren E. Burger
- Preceded by: George MacKinnon
- Succeeded by: Robert W. Warren

Senior Judge of the United States Court of Appeals for the Fourth Circuit
- In office April 1, 1976 – December 16, 1995

Judge of the United States Court of Appeals for the Fourth Circuit
- In office September 22, 1971 – April 1, 1976
- Appointed by: Richard Nixon
- Preceded by: Herbert Stephenson Boreman
- Succeeded by: Kenneth Keller Hall

Chief Judge of the United States District Court for the Southern District of West Virginia
- In office August 13, 1959 – October 7, 1971
- Preceded by: Ben Moore
- Succeeded by: Sidney Lee Christie

Judge of the United States District Court for the Southern District of West Virginia
- In office August 13, 1959 – October 7, 1971
- Appointed by: Dwight D. Eisenhower
- Preceded by: Ben Moore
- Succeeded by: Kenneth Keller Hall

Personal details
- Born: John A. Field Jr. March 22, 1910 Charleston, West Virginia
- Died: December 16, 1995 (aged 85) Naples, Florida
- Party: Republican
- Education: Hampden–Sydney College (AB); University of Virginia School of Law (LLB)

John A. Field Jr. (March 22, 1910 – December 16, 1995) was a United States circuit judge of the United States Court of Appeals for the Fourth Circuit and previously was a United States district judge of the United States District Court for the Southern District of West Virginia.

== Education and career ==
Born in Charleston, West Virginia, Field received an Artium Baccalaureus degree from Hampden–Sydney College in 1932 and a Bachelor of Laws from the University of Virginia School of Law in 1935. He was in private practice in Charleston from 1935 to 1943. He was in the United States Navy during World War II, from 1944 to 1946. He returned to private practice in Charleston from 1947 to 1957, and was member of the Charleston City Council from 1947 to 1951, and president of that body from 1951 to 1955. He unsuccessfully ran as a Republican candidate for West Virginia state attorney general in 1956, but was instead appointed state tax commissioner from 1957 to 1959.

== Federal judicial service ==
On May 11, 1959, Field was nominated by President Dwight D. Eisenhower to a seat on the United States District Court for the Southern District of West Virginia vacated by Judge Ben Moore. He was confirmed by the United States Senate on August 12, 1959, and received his commission the following day. He served as Chief Judge from 1959 to 1971. His service terminated on October 7, 1971, due to his elevation to the Fourth Circuit.

On September 8, 1971, Field was nominated by President Richard Nixon to a seat on the United States Court of Appeals for the Fourth Circuit vacated by Judge Herbert Stephenson Boreman. He was confirmed by the Senate on September 21, 1971, and received his commission on September 22, 1971. He assumed senior status on April 1, 1976. He served as a Judge of the United States Foreign Intelligence Surveillance Court of Review from May 19, 1982, to May 18, 1989. His service terminated on December 16, 1995, due to his death in Naples, Florida.

== Sources ==
Party political offices
Preceded by John L. McIntire	Republican nominee for West Virginia Attorney General; 1956	Succeeded by Elmer Dodson
Legal offices
Preceded by Ben Moore	Judge of the United States District Court for the Southern District of West Virginia; 1959–1971	Succeeded by Kenneth Keller Hall
Preceded by Ben Moore	Chief Judge of the United States District Court for the Southern District of West Virginia; 1959–1971	Succeeded by Sidney Lee Christie
Preceded by Herbert Stephenson Boreman	Judge of the United States Court of Appeals for the Fourth Circuit; 1971–1976	Succeeded by Kenneth Keller Hall
Preceded by George MacKinnon	Judge of the United States Foreign Intelligence Surveillance Court of Review; 1982–1989	Succeeded by Robert W. Warren
