= Lloyd Jackson =

Lloyd Jackson may refer to:

- Lloyd G. Jackson (1918–2011), American politician from West Virginia
- Lloyd G. Jackson II (born 1952), American politician from West Virginia
- Lloyd Douglas Jackson (1888–1973), mayor of Hamilton, Ontario
- Lloyd Jackson (ice hockey) (1912–1999), Canadian ice hockey player

== See also ==
- Lloyd D. Jackson Square, shopping center in Hamilton, Ontario
