= Senator Wiley (disambiguation) =

Alexander Wiley (1884–1967) was a U.S. Senator from Wisconsin from 1939 to 1963. Senator Wiley may also refer to:

- Ariosto A. Wiley (1848–1908), Alabama State Senate
- James Franklin Wiley (1832–1902), Wisconsin State Senate
- Rankin Wiley Jr. (1853–1929), West Virginia State Senate
- Sean Wiley (born 1971), Pennsylvania State Senate
- Stephen B. Wiley (1929–2015), New Jersey State Senate

== See also ==
- Senator Willey (disambiguation)
