= Larry Tucker =

Larry Tucker may refer to:

- Larry Tucker (politician)
- Larry Tucker (screenwriter)
