= Senator Vickers (disambiguation) =

George Vickers (1801–1879) was a U.S. Senator from Maryland from 1868 to 1873. Senator Vickers may also refer to:

- Arnold M. Vickers (1908–1967), West Virginia State Senate
- Evan Vickers (born 1954), Utah State Senate
- Tom Vickers (1936–2026), Nebraska State Senate
