= 2004 West Virginia gubernatorial election =

- November 2, 2004
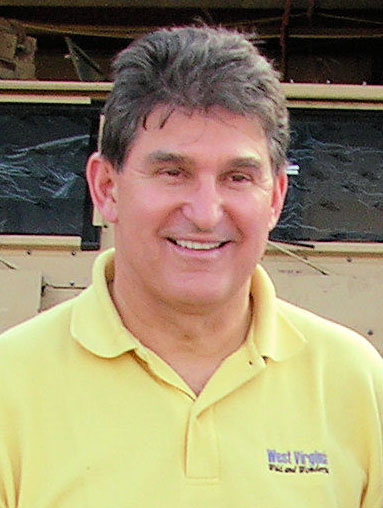

Nominee	Joe Manchin	Monty Warner
Party	Democratic	Republican
Popular vote	472,758	253,131
Percentage	63.51%	34.00%
- County results Manchin: 40–50% 50–60% 60–70% 70–80% 80–90% Warner: 40–50% 50–60%
Governor before election
Bob Wise
Democratic
Elected Governor
Joe Manchin
Democratic

The 2004 West Virginia gubernatorial election took place on November 2, 2004 for the post of Governor of West Virginia. Democratic Secretary of State of West Virginia Joe Manchin defeated Republican Monty Warner. Manchin won all but 3 counties. Despite Democratic presidential nominee John Kerry losing the state to George W. Bush by double digits in the concurrent presidential election, Manchin won by nearly 30 points.

== Democratic primary ==
=== Candidates ===
- Jerry Baker
- James A. Baughman, former State Senator
- Louis J. Davis, candidate in 1996
- Phillip Frye, husband of incumbent governor's mistress
- Lloyd G. Jackson II, former State Senator
- Jim Lees, attorney and candidate for governor in 1996 and 2000
- Joe Manchin, West Virginia Secretary of State and candidate for governor in 1996
- Lacy W. Wright, Jr., former State Senator

=== Campaign ===
Democratic governor Bob Wise became the first governor of West Virginia not to stand for re-election since the Constitution of West Virginia was amended in 1970 to permit two consecutive terms. In August 2003 he announced that he would not stand again after admitting to an affair with a West Virginia Development Office employee Angela Mascia, who was also married. The announcement took place three months after this became public knowledge and over 500 emails exchanged between the two were released to the public through a Freedom of Information Act request. Angela Mascia's then husband, Phillip Frye, divorced Mascia and ran for governor. Frye told The Daily Show in August 2003 that he was running “to be a sheer nuisance to Bob Wise” and "I'm not qualified to run our great state, or have any hopes whatsoever of winning an election."

West Virginia Secretary of State Joe Manchin challenged Wise for the Democratic nomination, and after Wise withdrew from the race he became the favorite for the primary. Manchin lined up support from various sources including labor leaders in order to reverse his defeat in the gubernatorial primary in 1996. His main opponent in the primary was former State Senator Lloyd Jackson, who launched his campaign with a plan to reduce insurance costs. In the run up to the primary the two candidates traded negative advertising, but Manchin won an easy victory in the primary on May 11.

=== Results ===
Democratic primary results
Party	Candidate	Votes	%
Democratic	Joe Manchin	149,362	52.73
Democratic	Lloyd G. Jackson II	77,052	27.20
Democratic	Jim Lees	40,161	14.18
Democratic	Lacy Wright, Jr.	4,963	1.75
Democratic	Jerry Baker	3,009	1.06
Democratic	James A. Baughman	2,999	1.06
Democratic	Phillip Frye	2,892	1.02
Democratic	Lou Davis	2,824	1.00
Total votes		283,262	100.00

== Republican primary ==
=== Candidates ===
- Carroll B. Bowden, Sr.
- Rob Capehart, former West Virginia Secretary of Tax and Revenue
- Larry Faircloth, State Delegate
- Douglas McKinney, physician
- Dan Moore, banker and car dealership owner
- Joseph Oliverio, construction executive
- James D. Radcliffe, Jr.
- Charles D. Railey
- Richard Robb, Mayor of South Charleston
- Monty Warner, businessman

=== Campaign ===
The Republican primary saw 10 candidates competing for the nomination. Six of them met in a debate in March 2004, in which they agreed on the need to reduce the size of the West Virginia state government. It saw a close race between three main candidates: Monty Warner, a retired army colonel and developer; Rob Capehart, a former state tax secretary; and Dan Moore, a former banker and car dealer. A poll conducted during the lead-up to the primary showed the three candidates virtually even. Warner won a narrow victory in the primary over Moore and Capehart.

=== Results ===
Republican primary results
Party	Candidate	Votes	%
Republican	Monty Warner	26,041	22.87
Republican	Dan R. Moore	22,748	19.98
Republican	Rob Capehart	19,694	17.29
Republican	Richard Robb	11,824	10.38
Republican	Douglas E. McKinney	10,476	9.20
Republican	Larry V. Faircloth	9,123	8.01
Republican	Joseph Oliverio	7,687	6.75
Republican	James D. Radcliffe, Jr.	3,013	2.65
Republican	Charles G. Railey	2,345	2.06
Republican	Carroll B. Bowden, Sr.	925	0.81
Total votes		113,876	100

== General election ==
=== Campaign ===
Early in the campaign, Warner called for Manchin, as a centrist Democrat, to endorse President George W. Bush for re-election over his Democratic rival John Kerry. Manchin's campaign spokesperson responded that Manchin backed "the Democratic nominee".

The two main candidates faced each other in three debates and one town hall meeting. Jesse Johnson, the Mountain Party candidate, unsuccessfully attempted to get the West Virginia Supreme Court to cancel the first debate, as he was not asked to take part.

Manchin had an edge in the election with better name recognition and a strong financial advantage over Warner. In the closing weeks of the election campaign, Manchin spent $3.3 million against $880,000 by Warner.

=== Predictions ===
Source	Ranking	As of
Sabato's Crystal Ball	Safe D	November 1, 2004

=== Results ===
West Virginia gubernatorial election, 2004
Party	Candidate	Votes	%	±%
Democratic	Joe Manchin	472,758	63.51%	+13.39%
Republican	Monty Warner	253,131	34.00%	−13.21%
Mountain	Jesse Johnson	18,430	2.48%	+0.87%
Write-in		114	0.02%	+0.01%
Margin of victory		219,627	29.50%	+26.58%
Total votes		744,433		
Democratic hold		Swing		

==== By county ====
County	Joe Manchin Democratic		Monty Warner Republican		Jesse Johnson Mountain		Simon McClure Write-in		Margin		Total
County	#	%	#	%	#	%	#	%	#	%	Total
Barbour	4,516	68.41%	2,002	30.33%	83	1.26%	0	0.00%	2,514	38.09%	6,601
Berkeley	16,044	48.17%	16,630	49.93%	631	1.89%	3	0.01%	−586	−1.76%	33,308
Boone	8,070	79.12%	1,934	18.96%	196	1.92%	0	0.00%	6,136	60.16%	10,200
Braxton	4,404	75.03%	1,376	23.44%	90	1.53%	0	0.00%	3,028	51.58%	5,870
Brooke	7,591	70.60%	2,961	27.54%	200	1.86%	0	0.00%	4,630	43.06%	10,752
Cabell	22,589	60.24%	13,829	36.88%	1,078	2.87%	1	0.00%	8,760	23.36%	37,497
Calhoun	1,957	67.81%	799	27.69%	130	4.50%	0	0.00%	1,158	40.12%	2,886
Clay	2,932	72.23%	1,008	24.83%	119	2.93%	0	0.00%	1,924	47.40%	4,059
Doddridge	1,492	46.96%	1,603	50.46%	82	2.58%	0	0.00%	−111	−3.49%	3,177
Fayette	11,448	67.76%	4,979	29.47%	468	2.77%	0	0.00%	6,469	38.29%	16,895
Gilmer	1,975	69.89%	739	26.15%	112	3.96%	0	0.00%	1,236	43.74%	2,826
Grant	2,127	46.19%	2,421	52.57%	57	1.24%	0	0.00%	−294	−6.38%	4,605
Greenbrier	8,461	58.77%	5,439	37.78%	496	3.45%	0	0.00%	3,022	20.99%	14,396
Hampshire	4,241	54.62%	3,323	42.80%	200	2.58%	0	0.00%	918	11.82%	7,764
Hancock	8,586	66.58%	4,115	31.91%	194	1.50%	0	0.00%	4,471	34.67%	12,895
Hardy	2,907	59.17%	1,895	38.57%	111	2.26%	0	0.00%	1,012	20.60%	4,913
Harrison	20,365	66.91%	9,373	30.79%	687	2.26%	12	0.04%	10,992	36.11%	30,437
Jackson	8,374	63.89%	4,426	33.77%	303	2.31%	3	0.02%	3,948	30.12%	13,106
Jefferson	10,561	54.07%	8,295	42.47%	676	3.46%	1	0.01%	2,266	11.60%	19,533
Kanawha	54,620	63.08%	28,817	33.28%	3,147	3.63%	6	0.01%	25,803	29.80%	86,590
Lewis	4,806	68.46%	2,041	29.07%	164	2.34%	9	0.13%	2,765	39.39%	7,020
Lincoln	5,590	68.05%	2,364	28.78%	260	3.17%	0	0.00%	3,226	39.27%	8,214
Logan	10,505	73.12%	3,592	25.00%	268	1.87%	2	0.01%	6,913	48.12%	14,367
Marion	17,911	71.86%	6,496	26.06%	506	2.03%	11	0.04%	11,415	45.80%	24,924
Marshall	10,256	68.13%	4,535	30.13%	262	1.74%	0	0.00%	5,721	38.01%	15,053
Mason	8,504	71.28%	3,159	26.48%	267	2.24%	0	0.00%	5,345	44.80%	11,930
McDowell	5,731	79.29%	1,320	18.26%	177	2.45%	0	0.00%	4,411	61.03%	7,228
Mercer	13,997	62.65%	7,980	35.72%	365	1.63%	1	0.00%	6,017	26.93%	22,343
Mineral	6,206	55.14%	4,840	43.00%	208	1.85%	1	0.01%	1,366	12.14%	11,255
Mingo	8,730	82.33%	1,734	16.35%	140	1.32%	0	0.00%	6,996	65.98%	10,604
Monongalia	20,512	61.12%	11,220	33.43%	1,819	5.42%	10	0.03%	9,292	27.69%	33,561
Monroe	3,425	58.04%	2,357	39.94%	119	2.02%	0	0.00%	1,068	18.10%	5,901
Morgan	3,209	49.55%	3,117	48.13%	150	2.32%	0	0.00%	92	1.42%	6,476
Nicholas	7,153	69.43%	2,909	28.23%	241	2.34%	0	0.00%	4,244	41.19%	10,303
Ohio	13,470	67.13%	6,263	31.21%	295	1.47%	39	0.19%	7,207	35.91%	20,067
Pendleton	2,081	62.14%	1,246	37.21%	22	0.66%	0	0.00%	835	24.93%	3,349
Pleasants	2,416	71.69%	927	27.51%	27	0.80%	0	0.00%	1,489	44.18%	3,370
Pocahontas	2,344	60.80%	1,329	34.47%	181	4.70%	1	0.03%	1,015	26.33%	3,855
Preston	5,889	49.62%	5,610	47.27%	368	3.10%	2	0.02%	279	2.35%	11,869
Putnam	14,373	57.67%	9,998	40.12%	549	2.20%	1	0.00%	4,375	17.56%	24,921
Raleigh	17,363	57.25%	12,359	40.75%	607	2.00%	0	0.00%	5,004	16.50%	30,329
Randolph	7,952	69.47%	3,160	27.61%	330	2.88%	4	0.03%	4,792	41.87%	11,446
Ritchie	2,322	56.05%	1,724	41.61%	97	2.34%	0	0.00%	598	14.43%	4,143
Roane	3,874	63.43%	2,039	33.38%	195	3.19%	0	0.00%	1,835	30.04%	6,108
Summers	3,385	61.80%	1,925	35.15%	167	3.05%	0	0.00%	1,460	26.66%	5,477
Taylor	4,451	68.50%	1,975	30.39%	68	1.05%	4	0.06%	2,476	38.10%	6,498
Tucker	2,361	66.23%	1,083	30.38%	121	3.39%	0	0.00%	1,278	35.85%	3,565
Tyler	2,447	57.82%	1,705	40.29%	80	1.89%	0	0.00%	742	17.53%	4,232
Upshur	5,992	64.51%	3,130	33.70%	165	1.78%	1	0.01%	2,862	30.81%	9,288
Wayne	11,479	65.15%	5,903	33.51%	236	1.34%	0	0.00%	5,576	31.65%	17,618
Webster	2,848	76.44%	779	20.91%	99	2.66%	0	0.00%	2,069	55.53%	3,726
Wetzel	5,228	74.05%	1,752	24.82%	80	1.13%	0	0.00%	3,476	49.24%	7,060
Wirt	1,765	68.28%	787	30.44%	33	1.28%	0	0.00%	978	37.83%	2,585
Wood	24,904	64.01%	13,383	34.40%	620	1.59%	2	0.01%	11,521	29.61%	38,909
Wyoming	6,019	70.57%	2,426	28.44%	84	0.98%	0	0.00%	3,593	42.13%	8,529
Totals	472,758	63.51%	253,131	34.00%	18,430	2.48%	114	0.02%	219,627	29.50%	744,433

==== Counties that flipped from Republican to Democratic ====
- Cabell (largest city: Huntington)
- Greenbrier (largest city: Lewisburg)
- Hardy (largest city: Moorefield)
- Mercer (largest city: Bluefield)
- Monroe (largest city: Peterstown)
- Ohio (largest city: Wheeling)
- Pendleton (largest city: Franklin)
- Pleasants (largest city: St. Marys)
- Pocahontas (largest city: Marlinton)
- Raleigh (largest city: Beckley)
- Summers (largest city: Hinton)
- Taylor (largest city: Grafton)
- Wetzel (largest city: New Martinsville)
- Brooke (largest borough: Wellsburg)
- Ritchie (largest municipality: Harrisville)
- Hampshire (largest municipality: Romney)
- Mineral (largest municipality: Keyser)
- Morgan (largest municipality: Berkeley Springs)
- Upshur (largest municipality: Buckhannon)
- Wirt (largest municipality: Elizabeth)
- Preston (largest municipality: Kingwood)
- Wood (largest municipality: Parkersburg)
