= Senator Randolph =

Senator Randolph may refer to:

== Members of the United States Senate ==
- Jennings Randolph (1902–1998), U.S. Senator from West Virginia from 1958 to 1985
- John Randolph of Roanoke (1773–1833), U.S. Senator from Virginia from 1825 to 1827
- Theodore Fitz Randolph (1826–1883), U.S. Senator from New Jersey from 1875 to 1881

== United States state senate members ==
- Benjamin F. Randolph (1820–1868), South Carolina State Senate
- Byron B. Randolph (fl. 1940s), West Virginia State Senate
- James Henry Randolph (1825–1900), Tennessee State Senate
- Lonnie Randolph (born 1949), Indiana State Senate
- Ned Randolph (1942–2016), Louisiana State Senate
- Samuel W. Randolph (1872–1941), Wisconsin State Senate
- Thomas Mann Randolph Jr. (1768–1828), Virginia State Senate
