= Senator Foreman =

Senator Foreman or Forman may refer to:

- Dan Foreman (born 1953), Idaho State Senate
- Ferris Foreman (1808–1901), Illinois State Senate
- Howard Forman (politician) (1946–2023), Florida State Senate
- L. J. Forman (1855–1933), West Virginia Senate
- William S. Forman (1847–1908), Illinois State Senate
