= Senator Price =

Senator Price may refer to:

- Bob Price (Texas politician) (1927–2004), Texas State Senate
- Curren Price (born 1950), California State Senate
- Ed Price (Florida politician) (1918–2012), Florida State Senate
- Ed Price (Louisiana politician) (born 1953), Louisiana State Senate
- Eli Kirk Price (1797–1884), Pennsylvania State Senate
- George E. Price (1848–1938), West Virginia State Senate
- Hugh H. Price (1859–1904), Wisconsin State Senate
- Jacinta Nampijinpa Price (born 1981), Senator for the Northern Territory, Australia
- Jesse Price (politician) (1863–1939), Maryland State Senate
- Leonard Price (born 1942), Minnesota State Senate
- Marian Price (born 1938), Nebraska State Senate
- Phillip Price Jr. (born 1934), Pennsylvania State Senate
- Randy Price (born 1957), Alabama State Senate
- Samuel Price (1805–1884), U.S. Senator from West Virginia from 1876 to 1877
- Scott Price (Nebraska politician) (born 1962), Nebraska State Senate
- Tom Price (American politician) (born 1954), Georgia State Senate
- William T. Price (1824–1886), Wisconsin State Senate
