= Senator Coffman =

Senator Coffman may refer to:

- Charles G. Coffman (1875–1929), West Virginia State Senate
- Mike Coffman (born 1955), Colorado State Senate
