= New Cumberland =

New Cumberland is the name of several towns or cities in the United States of America:

- New Cumberland, Pennsylvania
- New Cumberland, West Virginia
