= Senator Arnold =

Senator Arnold may refer to:

- A. Otis Arnold (1878–1941), Illinois State Senate
- Alexander A. Arnold (1833–1915), Wisconsin State Senate
- Frank B. Arnold (1839–1890), New York State Senate
- Gohen C. Arnold, West Virginia State Senate
- Jim Arnold (Indiana politician) (born 1950), Indiana State Senate
- John W. Arnold (1842–1900), Illinois State Senate
- Louis A. Arnold (1872–?), Wisconsin State Senate
- Lynwood Arnold (1916–2001), Florida State Senate
- Norbert P. Arnold (1920–2014), Minnesota State Senate
- Samuel G. Arnold (1821–1880), U.S. Senator from Rhode Island
- Stanley Arnold (1903–1984), California State Senate
