= Ralph Bean =

Ralph Bean may refer to:

- Ralph Bean (footballer) (born 1980), Bermudian international footballer
- Ralph J. Bean (1912–1978), American politician
