= Attorney General May =

Attorney General May may refer to:

- Clark W. May (1869–1908), Attorney General of West Virginia
- Dwight May (1822–1880), Attorney General of Michigan
- George Augustus Chichester May (1815–1892), Attorney-General for Ireland
