= Senator Brotherton =

Senator Brotherton may refer to:

- Bill Brotherton (fl. 2010s), Arizona State Senate
- William T. Brotherton Jr. (1926–1997), West Virginia State Senate
