= Oak Glen =

Oak Glen may refer to:

- Oak Glen, Humboldt County, California
- Oak Glen, San Bernardino County, California
- Oak Glen, New Jersey
- Oak Glen (Portsmouth, Rhode Island), a historic house
- Oak Glen High School, New Cumberland, West Virginia
