= Senator White =

Senator White may refer to:

== Members of the United States Senate ==
- Albert Smith White (1803–1864), U.S. Senator from Indiana from 1839 to 1845
- Edward Douglass White (1845–1921), U.S. Senator from Louisiana from 1891 to 1894
- Francis S. White (1847–1922), U.S. Senator from Alabama from 1914 to 1915
- Hugh Lawson White (1773–1840), U.S. Senator from Tennessee from 1825 to 1840
- Samuel White (Delaware politician) (1770–1809), U.S. Senator from Delaware from 1801 to 1809
- Stephen M. White (1853–1901), U.S. Senator from California from 1893 to 1899
- Wallace H. White Jr. (1877–1952), U.S. Senator from Maine from 1931 to 1949

== United States state senate members ==
- Al White (politician) (born 1950), Colorado State Senate
- Albert B. White (1856–1941), West Virginia State Senate
- Andrew Dickson White (1832–1918), New York State Senate
- Benjamin F. White (Montana politician) (1833–1920), Montana State Senate
- Bodi White (born 1956), Louisiana State Senate
- Chilton A. White (1826–1900), Ohio State Senate
- Daniel Appleton White (1776–1861), Massachusetts State Senate
- Donald C. White (born 1950), Pennsylvania State Senate
- Doug White (politician) (born 1943), Ohio State Senate
- Francis White (Virginia politician) (1761–1826), Virginia State Senate
- Frank White (North Dakota politician) (1856–1940), North Dakota State Senate
- George E. White (politician) (1848–1935), Illinois State Senate
- George Henry White (1852–1918), North Carolina State Senate
- Harry White (Pennsylvania politician) (1834–1920), Pennsylvania State Senate
- Hays B. White (1855–1930), Kansas State Senate
- Horace White (1865–1943), New York State Senate
- James T. White (politician) (1837–1892), Arkansas State Senate
- James White (general) (1747–1821), Tennessee State Senate
- Jeanette White (born 1943), Vermont State Senate
- Jim White (politician) (born 1944), South Dakota State Senate
- John E. White (1873–1943), Massachusetts State Senate
- John L. White (1930–2001), New Jersey State Senate
- Joseph C. White (1899–1967), Massachusetts State Senate
- Kenneth S. White (1897–1976), Wisconsin State Senate
- Loren H. White (1863–1923), New York State Senate
- M. Z. White (1872–1945), West Virginia State Senate
- Mary Jo White (Pennsylvania politician) (born 1941), Pennsylvania State Senate
- Merritt F. White (1865–1934), Wisconsin State Senate
- Michael D. White (1827–1917), Indiana State Senate
- Michael R. White (politician) (born 1951), Ohio State Senate
- Milo White (1830–1913), Minnesota State Senate
- Newton Harris White (1860–1931), Tennessee State Senate
- Peter White (Michigan politician) (1830–1908), Michigan State Senate
- Philo White (1796–1883), Wisconsin State Senate
- Phineas White (1770–1847), Vermont State Senate
- Randy White (West Virginia politician) (born 1955), West Virginia State Senate
- Robert White (West Virginia state senator) (1876–1935), West Virginia State Senate
- Roderick White (1814–1856), New York State Senate
- Scott White (politician) (1970–2011), Washington State Senate
- Stan White (politician) (fl. 2010s), North Carolina State Senate
- Tom White (Nebraska politician) (born 1956), Nebraska State Senate
- Walter L. White (1919–2007), Ohio State Senate
- William White (Secretary of State) (1762–1811), North Carolina State Senate

== See also ==
- William Pinkney Whyte (1824–1908), U.S. Senator from Maryland
