= Thomas J. Farnsworth =

American politician

President of the Senate of West Virginia
- In office 1883–1885
- Preceded by: Albert E. Summers
- Succeeded by: George E. Price

Member of the West Virginia Senate

Personal details
- Born: Thomas Jefferson Farnsworth; May 17, 1829 Buckhannon, West Virginia
- Died: October 12, 1916 (aged 87) Upshur County, West Virginia
- Party: Democratic
- Spouse: Mary E. Carper

Thomas Jefferson Farnsworth (1829-1916) was the Democratic President of the West Virginia Senate from Upshur County and served from 1883 to 1885.

Political offices
Preceded by Albert E. Summers	President of the WV Senate; 1883–1885	Succeeded by George E. Price
