= John W. McCreery =

American politician

President of the Senate of West Virginia
- In office 1891–1893
- Preceded by: Robert S. Carr
- Succeeded by: Rankin Wiley, Jr.

Member of the West Virginia Senate

Personal details
- Born: John Wallace McCreery; July 31, 1845 Monroe County, Virginia, U.S.
- Died: May 22, 1917 (aged 71) Raleigh, West Virginia, U.S.
- Party: Democratic
- Profession: attorney

John Wallace McCreery (July 31, 1845 – May 22, 1917) was the Democratic President of the West Virginia Senate from Raleigh County and served from 1891 to 1893.

Political offices
Preceded by Robert S. Carr	President of the WV Senate; 1891–1893	Succeeded by Rankin Wiley, Jr.
