= Joseph H. McDermott =

American politician

President of the Senate of West Virginia
- In office 1907–1909
- Preceded by: Gustavus A. Northcott
- Succeeded by: L. J. Forman

Member of the West Virginia Senate from the 11th district
- In office December 1, 1904 – December 1, 1908
- Preceded by: Ira E. Robinson
- Succeeded by: Winfield Scott Meredith

Personal details
- Born: Joseph Henry McDermott; July 28, 1871 Meadville, Pennsylvania, U.S.
- Died: December 12, 1930 (aged 59) Bluefield, West Virginia, U.S.
- Party: Republican
- Spouse: Louise Jane McLane
- Profession: oil operator

Joseph Henry McDermott (July 28, 1871 – December 12, 1930) was the Republican President of the West Virginia Senate from Monongalia County and served from 1907 to 1909.

Political offices
Preceded by Gustavus A. Northcott	President of the WV Senate; 1907–1909	Succeeded by L. J. Forman
