= Albert E. Summers =

American politician

President of the Senate of West Virginia
- In office 1881–1883
- Preceded by: Daniel D. Johnson
- Succeeded by: Thomas J. Farnsworth

Member of the West Virginia Senate

Speaker of the WV House of Delegates
- In office 1872
- Preceded by: Elbridge G. Cracraft
- Succeeded by: William M. Miller

Personal details
- Born: January 1, 1824 Virginia, U.S.
- Died: April 1, 1901 (aged 77) Charleston, West Virginia, U.S.
- Party: Democratic
- Spouse: Anna Ryon
- Education: Jefferson Medical College
- Profession: doctor

Albert Edgar Summers (January 1, 1824 – April 1, 1901) was an American politician from Kanawha County. He was the Democratic Speaker of the West Virginia House of Delegates in 1872 and Democratic President of the West Virginia Senate from 1881 to 1883.

Political offices
Preceded by Elbridge G. Cracraft	Speaker of the WV House of Delegates; 1872	Succeeded by William M. Miller
Preceded by Daniel D. Johnson	President of the WV Senate; 1881–1883	Succeeded by Thomas J. Farnsworth
