= Anthony Smith (American politician) =

American politician

President of the Senate of West Virginia
- In office 1901–1903
- Preceded by: Oliver S. Marshall
- Succeeded by: Clark W. May

Member of the West Virginia Senate
- In office 1883-1885; 1889-1891; 1899-1901

Member of the West Virginia House of Delegates
- In office 1871-1873; 1891-1893

Personal details
- Born: January 9, 1844 Beaver County, Pennsylvania, U.S.
- Died: c. 1920–30
- Party: Republican
- Spouse: Martha Fanny Holland
- Profession: Farmer, banker, attorney

Anthony Smith (born January 9, 1844) was the Republican President of the West Virginia Senate from Tyler County and served from 1901 to 1903.

== Early and family life ==
He was born January 9, 1844, in Beaver County, Pennsylvania. At age 4, he moved with his father to Virginia (years before the state of West Virginia was created). On August 14, 1862, when he was 18 years old, he enrolled in Company F, Fourteenth Regiment, West Virginia Volunteer Infantry. He served for two years before being captured. He remained a prisoner of war until the Confederacy was defeated.

== Career ==
He served numerous political offices over the years, including state delegate, state senator, and prosecuting attorney of Tyler County. He was President of the Senate during his last term. In 1888 he was a Presidential elector.

On December 20, 1870, he married Martha F. Holland, they had two children, a son and daughter.

== Death and legacy ==
He died sometime in the 1920s.

Political offices
Preceded by Oliver S. Marshall	President of the WV Senate; 1901–1903	Succeeded by Clark W. May
