= Oak Glen High School =

Location
- 195 Golden Bear Drive; New Cumberland, West Virginia 26047; United States; 40°32′36″N 80°33′33″W

Information
- Type: Public high school
- Established: 1963
- School district: Hancock County School District
- Superintendent: Kathy Kidder-Wilkerson
- Principal: David Smith
- Teaching staff: 35.00 (FTE)
- Grades: 9-12
- Student to teacher ratio: 14.14
- Campus type: Fringe Rural
- Colors: Columbia Blue, White, and Gold
- Athletics: Class AA
- Athletics conference: Ohio Valley Athletic Conference
- Team name: Golden Bears
- Rival: Weir Red Riders
- Yearbook: Oak Leaf
- Athletic Director: Frank Crain
- Website: oghs.hancock.k12.wv.us

Oak Glen High School is a public high school near New Cumberland, West Virginia, United States. It is one of two high schools in Hancock County Schools, serving the northern part of the county including the communities of Chester, Newell, and New Manchester. Athletic teams compete as the Oak Glen Golden Bears in the West Virginia Secondary School Activities Commission as a member of the Ohio Valley Athletic Conference.

== Notable alumni ==
- Daniel Johnston – Musician, subject of the 2006 documentary The Devil and Daniel Johnston and has performed on the live music television show Austin City Limits
- Joaquin Wilde – WWE Superstar
- Scott Paulsen - Voice actor, former on air personality at 102.5 WDVE Pittsburgh and author of "Night Fruit Army"
- Chris Enochs - Baseball player drafted by the Oakland Athletics
