= Robert F. Kidd =

American politician (1853–1930)

23rd President of the West Virginia Senate
- In office January 17, 1911 – January 30, 1911
- Preceded by: L. J. Forman
- Succeeded by: Henry D. Hatfield

Member of the West Virginia Senate
- In office December 1, 1922 – December 1, 1928
- Preceded by: John N. Shackleford
- Succeeded by: A. G. Mathews
- Constituency: 10th district
- In office December 1, 1898 – December 1, 1914
- Preceded by: Henry C. Lockney
- Succeeded by: Eskridge H. Morton
- Constituency: 4th district (1898‍–‍1902); 10th district (1902‍–‍1914)

Member of the West Virginia House of Delegates from Gilmer County
- In office December 1, 1928 – June 8, 1930
- Preceded by: J. M. Hays
- Succeeded by: E. E. Cottrill
- In office December 1, 1886 – December 1, 1888
- Preceded by: Robert R. Marshall
- Succeeded by: William H. Jack

Personal details
- Born: Robert Franklin Kidd; February 11, 1853 Upshur County, Virginia (now West Virginia), U.S.
- Died: June 8, 1930 (aged 77) Glenville, West Virginia, U.S.
- Party: Democratic
- Spouse: Lelia Rosalie Johnson (m. 1884)
- Occupation: Lawyer; educator; politician

Robert Franklin Kidd (February 11, 1853 – June 8, 1930) was an American lawyer and politician who served in both houses of the West Virginia Legislature.

Political offices
| Preceded by L. J. Forman | President of the West Virginia Senate; 1911 | Succeeded by Henry D. Hatfield |
