= W. Broughton Johnston =

American politician

W. Broughton Johnston (May 21, 1905 – August 1978) was the Democratic President of the West Virginia Senate from Mercer County and served from 1949 to 1953. He was born in McDowell County, West Virginia. His father and mother were Walter L. Johnston and Nellie F. Johnston.

Political offices
Preceded by Arnold M. Vickers	President of the WV Senate; 1949–1953	Succeeded by Ralph J. Bean
