= Keith Burdette =

American politician

Keith Burdette (born April 27, 1955) was the Secretary of Commerce for the state of West Virginia under the administration of Governor Earl Ray Tomblin. Burdette holds many state and national awards and records as he served at such young ages in various roles such as a former Democratic President of the West Virginia Senate from Wood County serving from 1989 to 1995. After serving as chief of staff for Governor Wise, Burdette ran The Burdette Group, a West Virginia-based government relations and lobbying company, until his appointment as secretary.

Keith Burdette's political education began early. He was a volunteer for Jay Rockefeller’s campaign for governor in 1972 at the age of 16 and by 1976 was running for public office in his own right. Elected to the first of two terms in the West Virginia House of Delegates in 1978, he entered the House as one of its youngest members in history. In 1982, he was elected to the state senate at the age of 27 and quickly began a climb through the ranks. He served as a member of both the Senate Finance and Judiciary Committees during his first term and became the vice chairman and later the chairman of the Education Committee.

During his second of three terms in the Senate, Burdette became Majority Leader and then in September 1989, was elected the 42nd president of the state senate and first in the line of gubernatorial succession at the historic age of only 34. Keith Burdette led efforts to reform the state's ethics laws; overhaul education funding and the Public Insurance Program. Working with Governor Caperton, he led the Senate through a series of financial reforms that rescued the state from near bankruptcy. In 1992, the United States Junior Chamber of Commerce recognized his leadership by naming him one of the Ten Outstanding Young Americans for the year.

Days after the 2000 election, Governor-elect Bob Wise asked Keith Burdette to join his administration. He was a key player during the transition, assisting with the interviews and selection of countless members of the new administration. His official title as a member of the Governor's senior staff was senior assistant for policy and legislative relations, but he became the go-to guy for an endless list of administrative goals. Burdette directed a legislative agenda that saw major reforms to the medical liability; workers compensation; and coal hauling laws. He orchestrated Governor Wise's bold reforms to the state's video lottery laws which were both groundbreaking and financially lucrative for the state. The law ultimately allowed the funding of the PROMISE scholarship program in West Virginia. He was the administrative point man for the development of the state budget, assisting in the production of three balanced budgets without a major tax increase in spite of a significant national economic downturn. He also played a key role in the selection of appointments to a broad array of government posts including the Public Service Commission, the State Board of Education and a variety of other boards and commissions.

Political offices
Preceded by Larry A. Tucker	President of the West Virginia Senate; 1989–1995	Succeeded by Earl Ray Tomblin
