= Howard W. Carson =

American politician (1910–1994)

Member of the West Virginia Senate from the 11th district
- In office 1956–1968
- Preceded by: J. Alfred Taylor, Jr.
- Succeeded by: Robert Holliday

President of the West Virginia Senate
- In office 1961–1969
- Preceded by: Ralph J. Bean
- Succeeded by: Lloyd G. Jackson

Personal details
- Born: April 30, 1910 Montgomery, West Virginia, U.S.
- Died: August 9, 1994 (aged 84) Charlottesville, Virginia, U.S.
- Party: Democratic Party

Howard W. Carson (April 30, 1910 – August 9, 1994) was an American Democratic politician. Carson was a member of the West Virginia Senate for the 11th district from 1956 to 1968. From 1961 to 1968, he served as President of the West Virginia Senate.

== Early life ==
Carson was born in Montgomery, Fayette County on April 30, 1910. He was the son of Lawrence W. and Alice Montgomery Carson. He received a law degree from Washington and Lee University.

== Career ==
Carson was named as Assistant Prosecuting Attorney for Fayette County, West Virginia in 1944. At roughly the same time, Carson became the chairman of the Fayette County Democratic Executive Committee. (Note: An article in the Beckley Post-Herald from 1948 states that he had held the office for "nearly four years") He resigned this position in 1948 to unsuccessfully run for the state's 11th Senate district, being defeated in the Democratic primary by J. Alfred Taylor, Jr. In 1952, Carson won the race for Prosecuting Attorney for Fayette County, succeeding his former boss C.B. Vickers.

Carson was elected to the West Virginia Senate in 1956. He was nominated again in 1960. As no one filed to stand in the Republican primary, the party executive committee chose John Gwinn to oppose Carson's reelection. However, Gwinn's certification was lost in the mail, and he was disqualified from the ballot. A write-in campaign for Gwinn only earned 5.2% of the vote, and Carson was re-elected.

Incumbent Senate President Ralph J. Bean did not seek reelection in 1960, leaving his position open for a replacement. Candidates included Carson and the moderate Julius W. Singleton of Morgantown. With the support of incoming Governor W. W. Barron and organized labor groups, Carson earned so much support among Senate Democrats that Singleton was not able to place his name for nomination. He would win his seat again in 1964, with no Republican opposition on the ballot.

Instead of running for a fourth term in the Senate, Carson opted to run for Attorney General. He was defeated in the Democratic primary by Chauncey H. Browning Jr. After losing, Carson practiced law privately in Fayette County. He was named the Clerk of the Senate for the 1972, 1973, and 1974 terms. He declined to seek the nomination for the 1975 session, citing health reasons.

== Personal life ==
Carson was married to Sunny N. née Hill in 1939, and had two children. He attended Fayetteville Methodist Church.

Carson died August 9, 1994, in his home in Charlottesville, Virginia.

Political offices
Preceded by Ralph J. Bean	President of the WV Senate; 1961–1969	Succeeded by Lloyd G. Jackson
