= William M. LaFon =

American politician

W. M. LaFon

President of the Senate of West Virginia
- In office 1939–1941
- Preceded by: Charles E. Hodges
- Succeeded by: Byron B. Randolph

Member of the West Virginia Senate for the 10th District

Personal details
- Born: March 8, 1888 Waiteville, West Virginia, U.S.
- Died: February 4, 1941 (aged 52) Charleston, West Virginia, U.S.
- Party: Democratic
- Spouse: Jessemine Showalter
- Profession: attorney

William Madison LaFon (March 8, 1888 – February 4, 1941) was the Democratic President of the West Virginia Senate from Monroe County and served from 1939 to 1941. He died of a heart attack in 1941.

Political offices
Preceded by Charles E. Hodges	President of the WV Senate; 1939–1941	Succeeded by Byron B. Randolph
