= Quincy Wilson (running back) =

American football player (born 1981)

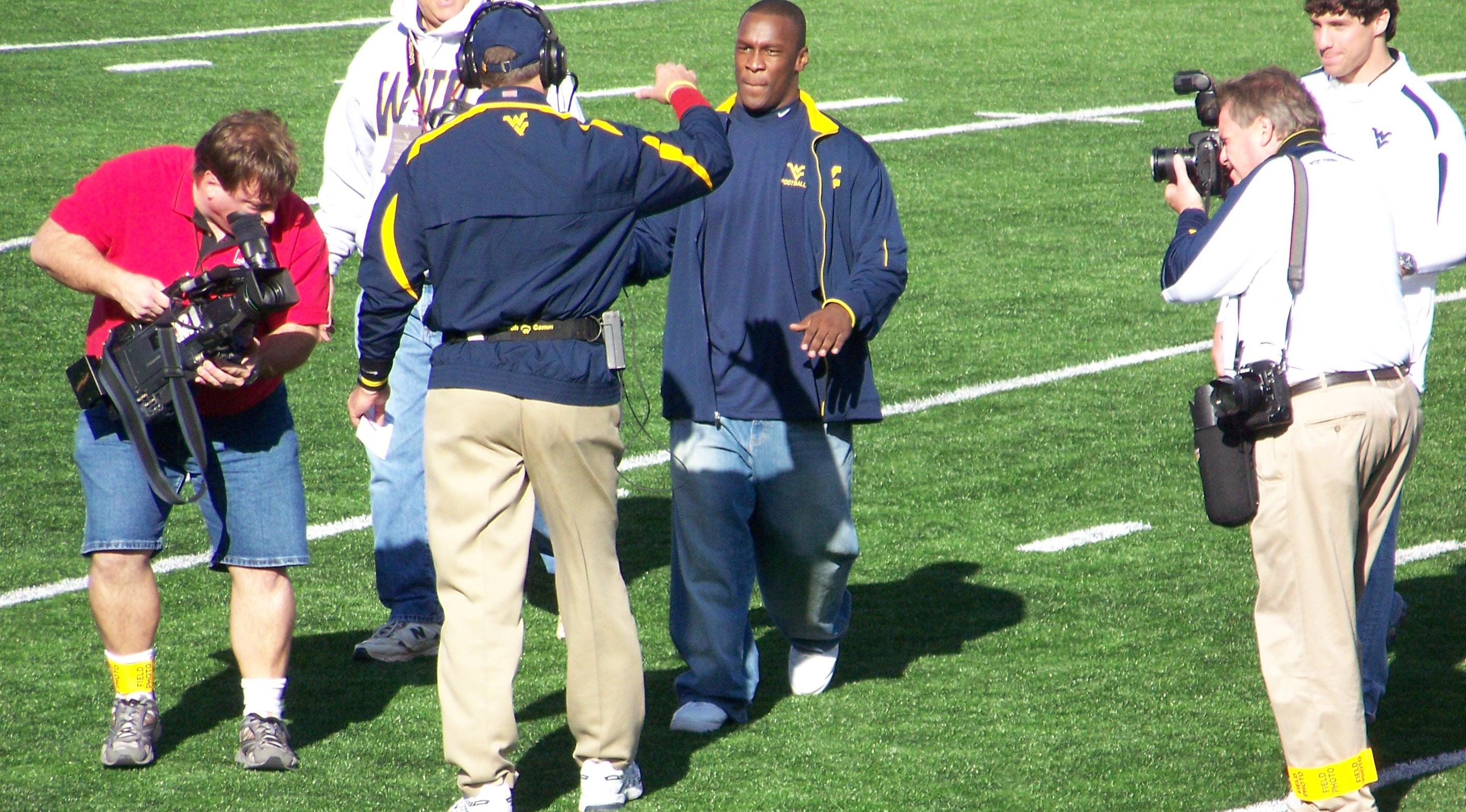
- Wilson (center) in 2007

No. 35
- Position: Running back

Personal information
- Born: April 26, 1981 (age 45); Weirton, West Virginia, U.S.
- Listed height: 5 ft 9 in (1.75 m)
- Listed weight: 220 lb (100 kg)

Career information
- High school: Weir (Weirton, West Virginia)
- College: West Virginia
- NFL draft: 2004: 7th round, 219th overall pick

Career history

Playing
- Atlanta Falcons (2004)*; Cincinnati Bengals (2004–2007); Florida Tuskers (2009)*
- * Offseason or practice squad member only

Coaching
- Glenville State (2017) Running backs coach; West Virginia State (2017–2021) Associate head coach & running backs coach; Fort Lauderdale (2022) Head coach; Fairmont State (2023) Running backs coach; Rio Grande (2024) Head coach; Weir High School (WV) (2024) Head Coach

Awards and highlights
- Third-team All-American (2003); First-team All-Big East (2003)

Career NFL statistics
- Rushing yards: 2
- Rushing average: 1
- Stats at Pro Football Reference

Head coaching record
- Career: 0–1 (.000)

Quincy Wilson (born April 26, 1981) is an American college football coach, former running back, and political candidate. He was previously the assistant director of football operations for the West Virginia Mountaineers. He was selected by the Atlanta Falcons in the seventh round of the 2004 NFL draft. He played college football at West Virginia. In 2025, Wilson was hired as the new head football coach at his high school alma mater, Weir High School.

Wilson was also a member of the Cincinnati Bengals and Florida Tuskers. He is the son of former NFL linebacker Otis Wilson.

On January 30th, 2026, Wilson announced his candidacy for the West Virginia House of Delegates first district as a Democrat.

== Early life ==
Wilson attended Weir High School where he became the first football player in West Virginia history to rush for more than 3,000 yards in a single season. Wilson finished with 3,262 yards on 351 carries (9.4 avg.), averaging 233 yards per game. This performance gave him 3rd ranking amongst prep football players. Wilson set several records and led Weir High School to a 14–0 record and a Class AA State Championship where he rushed for 250 yards. Wilson managed 47 touchdowns and 290 points that year, a state record. Over the course of his high school career, Wilson rushed for 6,161 yards and scored 90 touchdowns, and garnered many awards and national attention. USA Today recognized him as an honorable mention All American, and was rated the third best running back in the Middle East.

== College career ==
Wilson joined the West Virginia University Mountaineers for the 1999 season.

As a freshman backup for star running back Avon Cobourne, he played in 10 games gaining 146 yards on 27 carries and 1 touchdown. The following year, he was a medical redshirt and did not play. During his time off he bulked up and developed his legs.

In 2001, Wilson rushed for 181 yards in 25 carries and scored 1 touchdown. 2002 would prove to be his breakout year when he gained 901 yards and scored 6 touchdowns as a backup. He also set his career high for single game rushing when he rushed for 198 yards on 14 carries against East Carolina.

In 2003, with the departure of Cobourne, Wilson would start for West Virginia and impress with several outstanding performances, most notably "The Run", against the #2 ranked Miami Hurricanes. Wilson earned third-team Associated Press All-America honors and was an All-Big East first-team pick by ESPN as a senior in 2003, rushing for 1,380 yards with a 4.9 avg. and 12 TDs. He was also named WVU's offensive MVP as a senior, and won team's Ira Rodgers Award for all-around excellence. His rushing yardage total on the year was ranked 12th in the NCAA.

Played in 44 games at West Virginia, with 474 rushing attempts for 2,608 yards and 20 TDs, plus 25 receptions for 147 yards and one touchdown. His rushing attempts and yards both ranked fifth in school history at the close of his career.

== Professional career ==
Pre-draft measurables
Height	Weight	Arm length	Hand span	20-yard shuttle	Three-cone drill	Vertical jump	Broad jump	Bench press
5 ft 9 3/8 in (1.76 m)	225 lb (102 kg)	29 5/8 in (0.75 m)	9 3/8 in (0.24 m)	4.36 s	7.68 s	33.5 in (0.85 m)	9 ft 10 in (3.00 m)	26 reps
All values from NFL Combine

=== Atlanta Falcons ===
Wilson was selected in the seventh round (219th overall) of the 2004 NFL draft by the Atlanta Falcons. Wilson gained 28 yards on 16 carries during the preseason, but was cut from the team September 5, and signed to the practice squad on September 6.

=== Cincinnati Bengals ===
On December 18, 2004, Wilson was signed by the Cincinnati Bengals.

In 2005, Wilson had 97 yards on 20 attempts during all four preseason games but was waived again and re-signed to the practice squad. Wilson was then signed to the offseason roster in January 2006.

In 2006, Wilson tied for the league lead in preseason rushing yards with 217. Wilson was active for the first two regular season games, and finally made his NFL debut in the third game. Wilson was waived and re-signed to the practice squad. Wilson spent almost the rest of the year on the practice squad, finally being re-signed to the active roster for the season finale against the Pittsburgh Steelers, but was inactive. Wilson registered his first ever offensive regular season stat in week four against the New England Patriots, when on a first down he rushed for -3 yards, but then on a 2nd down he rushed for 5 yards. His totals for the year were 2 rushes for 2 yards. Wilson also played on special teams in weeks 3 through 5.

With rookie running back Kenny Irons shelved for the year due to a torn Anterior cruciate ligament, Wilson was the probable backup to starter Rudi Johnson. During the 2007 preseason, Wilson started out with 10 yards on six carries against the Detroit Lions. Against the New Orleans Saints, Wilson rushed for 19 yards on four carries. However, on September 2, 2007, Wilson was cut before the regular season began. Wilson was re-signed to the active roster on December 26, 2007, and saw a special-teams tackle in the season finale against the Miami Dolphins.

On April 7, 2008, Wilson was once again waived by the Bengals.

=== Florida Tuskers ===
Wilson was drafted by the Florida Tuskers on the UFL Premiere Season Draft in 2009 and signed with the team on August 17. He was cut before the first game in October 2009.

== Personal ==
In the 2006 offseason, Wilson held a youth football camp in Weirton, West Virginia on May 19, 2007, run and coordinated by his family Kyle Wilson, Chlyla Wilson and Sabastion Boner. Some athletes participating in the camp included former Mountaineers Kay-Jay Harris, Chris Henry, Rasheed Marshall, Adam "Pacman" Jones, Wilson's father Otis Wilson, T. J. Duckett, Jarrett Payton, and Ike Taylor.

On June 18, 2007, Wilson was involved in a wedding altercation in Huntington, West Virginia that led to his (and 14 others') arrests. Police reports said that Wilson and his group refused to disperse around 3 a.m. outside of a bar, which led to Wilson being charged with disorderly conduct.

Along with being an honorary team captain for the 2007 Mississippi State ballgame for West Virginia University, Wilson was also in attendance for numerous other games at his alma mater, including the 2008 and 2011 Gold-Blue Spring Games.

== Head coaching record ==
Year	Team	Overall	Conference	Standing	Bowl/playoffs
Fort Lauderdale Eagles (National Christian College Athletic Association) (2022)
2022	Fort Lauderdale	0–1	0–0	N/A	
Fort Lauderdale:		0–1	0–0		
Total:		0–1			
