= Dan R. Tonkovich =

American politician

President of the West Virginia Senate
- In office January 9, 1985 – January 11, 1989
- Preceded by: Warren McGraw
- Succeeded by: Larry Tucker

Personal details
- Born: Daniel R. Tonkovich; April 17, 1946
- Died: February 10, 2002 (aged 55)
- Party: Democratic
- Education: West Liberty University (BA); Syracuse University (MPA)

Daniel R. Tonkovich (April 17, 1946 – February 10, 2002) was an American politician who served as a member of the West Virginia House of Delegates and the Democratic President of the West Virginia Senate from Marshall County.

== Background ==
Dan R. Tonkovich was the son of Olga (Ovchinnik) Tonkovich of Benwood, West Virginia, and Daniel Tonkovich. He was a graduate of Bishop Donahue Memorial High School in McMechen and received a B.A. degree from West Liberty State College and a M.P.A. degree from the Maxwell School of Citizenship and Public Affairs, Syracuse University.

Tonkovich then served in the United States Army Infantry in Vietnam.

== Career ==
Tonkovich was elected to the West Virginia House of Delegates in 1972 and 1974 and was then elected to the West Virginia Senate from the 2nd Senatorial District in 1979, the first senator from Marshall County elected to the office and was named one of the "Outstanding Young Men of America" in 1974, 1976 and 1977. Tonkovich was appointed Senate Majority Whip in 1981 and Senate Majority Leader in 1983. In 1984 he was elected again. While in the legislature, he served on many committees including Education, Health and Welfare committees and the Interim Committee on Penal Reform. He was also involved in the passage of the State Open Meetings Law and the Freedom of Information Act. He was also a member of the Democratic National Committee as well as the Congressional Senatorial Committee.

== Arrest and Conviction ==
In September 1989, Tonkovich pled guilty to extorting $5,000 from a group that sought his support of casino gambling legislation in 1986.

The proceeding was delayed when the judge said he was not sure that Tonkovich was guilty and gave him time to reconsider. Tonkovich still maintained he was guilty of extortion. Tonkovich's guilty plea to one count of a six-count indictment came after a federal jury heard five days of testimony during his extortion and racketeering trial. U.S. Attorney Michael Carey said prosecutors planned to dismiss the remaining charges.

'Your honor, I'd like to change my plea from not guilty to guilty,' Tonkovich told U.S. District Judge John Copenhaver. Throughout the trial, the defense had maintained that Tonkovich, 43, believed WVCC paid him the money for marketing work he was hired to perform.

Copenhaver recessed the proceedings for 10 minutes to allow Tonkovich to confer with his lawyer, James Lees. Following the recess, Tonkovich said he believed WVCC paid him the money to gain influence over him and that he was guilty of extortion. Copenhaver delayed accepting Tonkovich's plea for several minutes Thursday, saying he was not convinced the former lawmaker was guilty of the extortion charge.

Tonkovich signed a plea agreement with federal prosecutors in which he admitted extorting $5,000 from WVVC Inc. in February 1986. The judge also ordered Tonkovich to pay $4,800 in jury costs associated with the five-day trial within 30 days.

In December 1989, Tonkovich was sentenced to five years in prison and fined $10,000 in federal court for extorting $5,000 from gambling interests.

== Later years ==
After his release, Tonkovich became the head of the Justice Fellowship project in Pennsylvania, a program that advocates for a criminal justice system that upholds restorative values, so that communities are safer, victims are respected, and those who have caused harm are transformed. Outside prisons, the organization collaborates with churches, para-church organizations, and local service providers to support families with loved ones behind bars and people affected by crime. Prison Fellowship staff and volunteers also help to prepare men and women to leave prison with a positive outlook—ready to succeed. In several prison facilities, mentorships are offered, life-skills training, marriage and parenting classes, and other programs that teach personal responsibility, the value of education and hard work, and care for people and their property, so that prisoners are prepared to thrive in their communities after release.

Tonkovich died at age 55; his body was discovered on February 10, 2002, at his Benwood area home by his son. Tonkovich's death was announced on the Senate floor and senators observed a moment of silence. He was the father of three children, daughters Stacy Tonkovich-Russell, Kaitlynn M. Tonkovich, and son Brandon D. Tonkovich of Wheeling.

Political offices
Preceded by Warren McGraw	President of the West Virginia Senate; 1985–1989	Succeeded by Larry A. Tucker
