= Oliver S. Marshall =

American politician

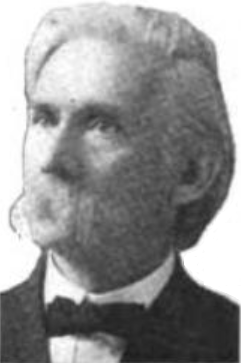
- Marshall in 1916

President of the West Virginia Senate
- In office 1899–1901
- Preceded by: Nelson E. Whitaker
- Succeeded by: Anthony Smith

Member of the West Virginia Senate from the 1st District
- In office 1897–1901
- In office 1905–1909
- In office 1913–1917

Personal details
- Born: September 24, 1850 Fairview, Virginia, U.S.
- Died: May 19, 1934 (aged 83) New Cumberland, West Virginia, U.S.
- Party: Republican
- Spouses: Elizabeth Tarr (m. 1880, died) Nora Householder (m. 1890)
- Children: 4
- Education: Bethany College
- Occupation: Politician

Oliver S. Marshall (September 24, 1850 – May 19, 1934) was an American politician serving as a member of the West Virginia Senate from 1st District in three terms from 1897 to 1901, 1905 to 1909, and 1913 to 1917. A member of the Republican Party, he served as President of the Senate from 1899 to 1901.

== Biography ==
Oliver S. Marshall was born in Fairview, Virginia, now New Manchester, West Virginia on September 24, 1850, to James G. and Lavinia Miller Marshall. He was the great-grandson of Aaron Marshall, a pioneer settler about 1760 of what is now Hancock County, West Virginia. He attended West Liberty Normal School and graduated from Bethany College in 1878. He married Elizabeth Tarr on September 8, 1880; they had two children, John and Olive. After the death of Elizabeth, he married Nora Householder in 1890, and they had three children: Edith, Edmond, and Virginia.

Marshall served as a delegate to the 1892 Republican National Convention. In 1896, he was elected to the West Virginia State Senate from the 1st district. He served as president of the state senate for the 1899 session. During his term, he presided over senate proceedings that led to the passage of bills that incorporated West Virginia banks and savings institutions, established a procedure for West Virginia public institutions to report to the legislature, and reorganized the process for the legislature to consider appropriations bills. He was reelected to the Senate in 1904 and 1912.

Marshall died at his home in New Cumberland, West Virginia on May 19, 1934. The Marshall House in New Cumberland was listed on the National Register of Historic Places in 2001.

Political offices
Preceded by Nelson E. Whitaker	President of the WV Senate; 1899–1901	Succeeded by Anthony Smith
