= Senator Willey =

Senator Willey may refer to:

== Members of the United States Senate ==
- Calvin Willey (1776–1858), U.S. Senator from Connecticut from 1825 to 1831
- Waitman T. Willey (1811–1900), U.S. Senator from West Virginia from 1863 to 1871

== United States state senate members ==
- Edward E. Willey (1910–1986), Virginia State Senate
- John W. Willey (1797–1841), Ohio State Senate

== See also ==
- Senator Wiley (disambiguation)
