= Robert S. Carr =

American politician

President of the Senate of West Virginia
- In office 1889–1891
- Preceded by: George E. Price
- Succeeded by: John W. McCreery

Member of the West Virginia Senate

Personal details
- Born: Robert Stuart Carr; November 14, 1845 Cambridge, Ohio, U.S.
- Died: May 6, 1925 (aged 79) Charleston, West Virginia, U.S.
- Party: Democratic
- Spouse: Julia E. Wilson (m. 1870)
- Profession: Businessman

Robert Stuart "Uncle Bob" Carr (November 14, 1845 – May 6, 1925) was the Democratic President of the West Virginia Senate from Kanawha County and served from 1889 to 1891.

== Biography ==
Robert S. Carr was born in Cambridge, Ohio on November 14, 1845.

He died in Charleston, West Virginia on May 6, 1925.

Political offices
Preceded by George E. Price	President of the WV Senate; 1889–1891	Succeeded by John W. McCreery
