= William G. Worley =

American politician

William G. Worley was an American politician. He was the Republican President of the West Virginia Senate from Preston County and served from 1895 to 1897.

Born and raised in Monongalia County, West Virginia, Worley practiced law in that county prior to his election to the state senate, and resumed the practice of law after his political service ended. A Republican, Worley continued to support the party's political efforts after leaving government.

Political offices
| Preceded by Rankin Wiley, Jr. | President of the WV Senate; 1895–1897 | Succeeded by Nelson E. Whitaker |
