= A. G. Mathews =

American politician

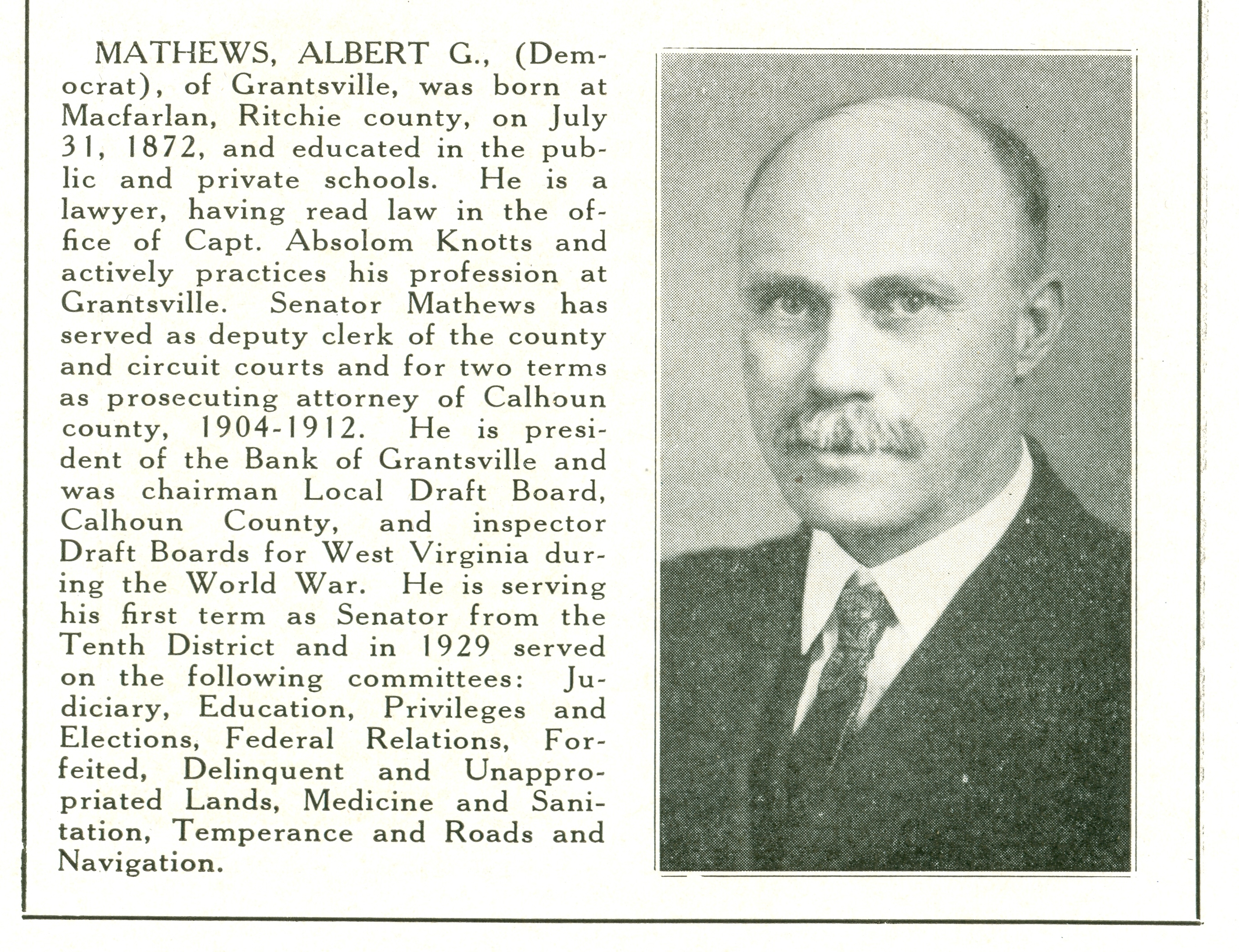

President of the Senate of West Virginia
- In office 1933–1935
- Preceded by: M. Z. White
- Succeeded by: Charles E. Hodges

Member of the West Virginia Senate from the 10th district
- In office December 1, 1928 – March 9, 1935
- Preceded by: Robert F. Kidd

Personal details
- Born: July 31, 1872 Macfarlan, West Virginia, U.S.
- Died: December 5, 1958 (aged 86) Wood, West Virginia, U.S.
- Party: Democratic
- Spouse: Mattie Thomas
- Profession: attorney

Albert G. Mathews (July 31, 1872 – December 5, 1958) was the Democratic President of the West Virginia Senate from Calhoun County and served from 1933 to 1935. He died of cancer in 1958.

Political offices
Preceded by M.Z. White	President of the WV Senate; 1933–1935	Succeeded by Charles E. Hodges
