= Gustavus A. Northcott =

American politician

G. A. Northcott
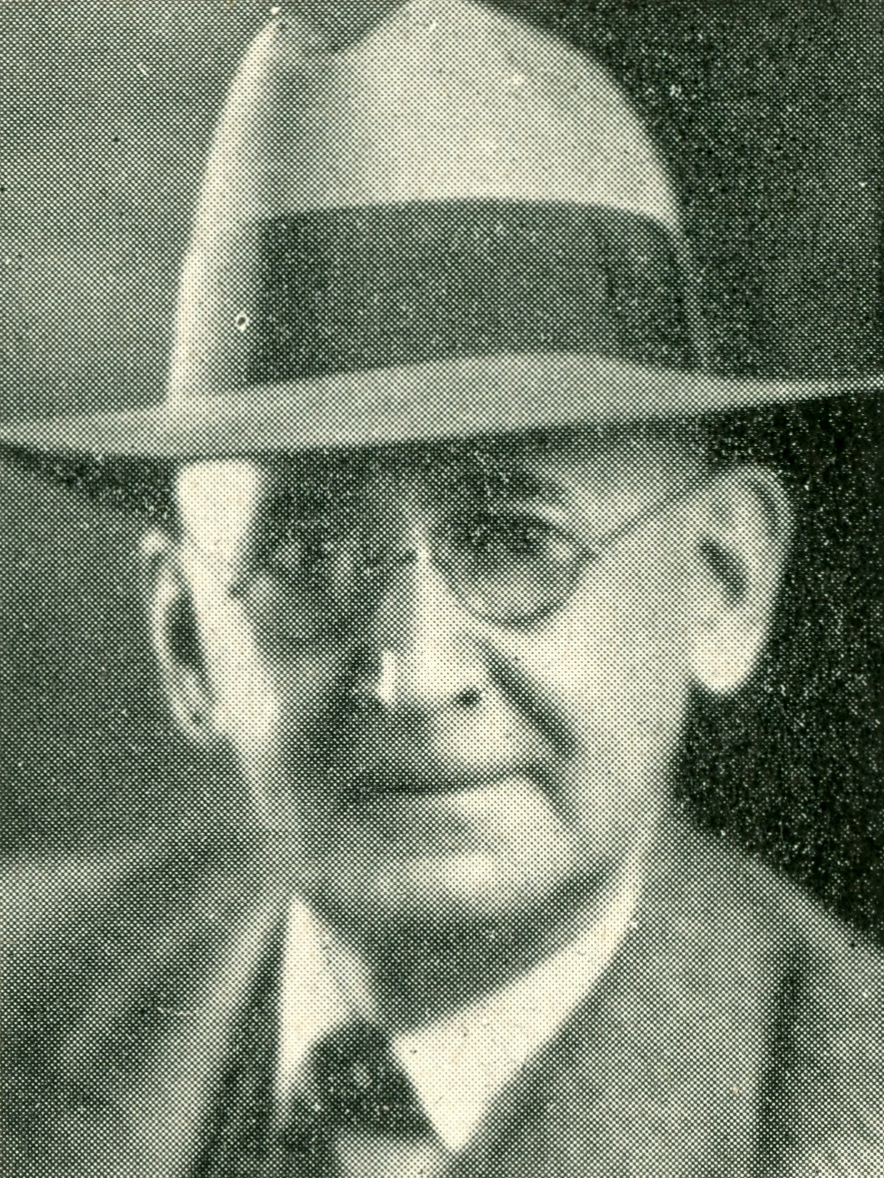

President of the Senate of West Virginia
- In office 1905–1907
- Preceded by: Clark W. May
- Succeeded by: Joseph H. McDermott

Member of the West Virginia Senate

Personal details
- Born: Gustavus Augustus Northcott; April 4, 1861 Murfreesboro, Tennessee, U.S.
- Died: December 8, 1938 (aged 77) Huntington, West Virginia, U.S.
- Party: Republican
- Spouse(s): Mamie S. Wilson m. 5 Jun 1888
- Profession: merchant

Gustavus Augustus Northcott (April 4, 1861 – December 8, 1938) was the Republican President of the West Virginia Senate from Cabell County and served from 1905 to 1907. He was the brother of Elliott Northcott, a federal judge.

Political offices
Preceded by Clark W. May	President of the WV Senate; 1905–1907	Succeeded by Joseph H. McDermott
