= Charles E. Hodges =

American politician

Charles Edward Hodges

President of the Senate of West Virginia
- In office 1935–1939
- Preceded by: A. G. Mathews
- Succeeded by: William M. LaFon

Member of the West Virginia Senate for the 11th District

Personal details
- Born: September 27, 1892 Huntington, West Virginia, U.S.
- Died: May 1, 1968 (aged 75) Charleston, West Virginia, U.S.
- Party: Democratic
- Spouse(s): Florence Kirkland Conant m. 3 Apr 1926
- Education: West Virginia University (A.B. 1913)
- Profession: attorney

Charles Edward Hodges (September 27, 1892 – May 1, 1968) was an American politician. He served as the Democratic President of the West Virginia Senate from Monongalia County from 1935 to 1939.

He was the son of Thomas Edward Hodges, a noted academic. Hodges died in a hospital in Charleston, West Virginia on May 1, 1968, where he had been for over a month after suffering a heart attack in March.

Political offices
| Preceded by A.G. Mathews | President of the WV Senate; 1935–1939 | Succeeded by William M. LaFon |
