= Harry G. Shaffer (politician) =

American politician

President of the Senate of West Virginia
- In office 1923–1925
- Preceded by: Gohen C. Arnold
- Succeeded by: Charles G. Coffman

Member of the West Virginia Senate

Personal details
- Born: January 22, 1885 Tunnelton, West Virginia, U.S.
- Died: July 3, 1971 (aged 86) Boone County, West Virginia, U.S.
- Party: Republican
- Profession: attorney

Harry Gustavus Shaffer, Sr. was the Republican President of the West Virginia Senate from Boone County and served from 1923 to 1925.

Political offices
Preceded by Gohen C. Arnold	President of the WV Senate; 1923–1925	Succeeded by Charles G. Coffman
