= First National Bank (New Cumberland, West Virginia) =

- First National Bank-Graham Building
- U.S. National Register of Historic Places
- The First National Bank-Graham Building in 2015

- Location within West Virginia Location within the United States
- Location: 100 N. Chester St., New Cumberland, West Virginia
- Coordinates: 40°29′54″N 80°36′35″W
- Area: less than one acre
- Built: 1903
- Architectural style: Early Commercial
- NRHP reference No.: 00001312
- Added to NRHP: November 2, 2000

The First National Bank is a historic commercial building located at New Cumberland, Hancock County, West Virginia. The building has also been known as the Graham Building and the Ross Building. It was built in 1903, and is a two-story, four bay blond brick building with an elevated basement. It features an elevated recessed corner entry with a Doric order column at the corner. It was originally occupied by the First National Bank, until it failed in 1927. For 61 years, from 1929 to 1990, the first floor space housed Graham's Department Store.

The building was listed on the National Register of Historic Places in 2000.
