= New Cumberland, West Virginia =

City in West Virginia, US

- City
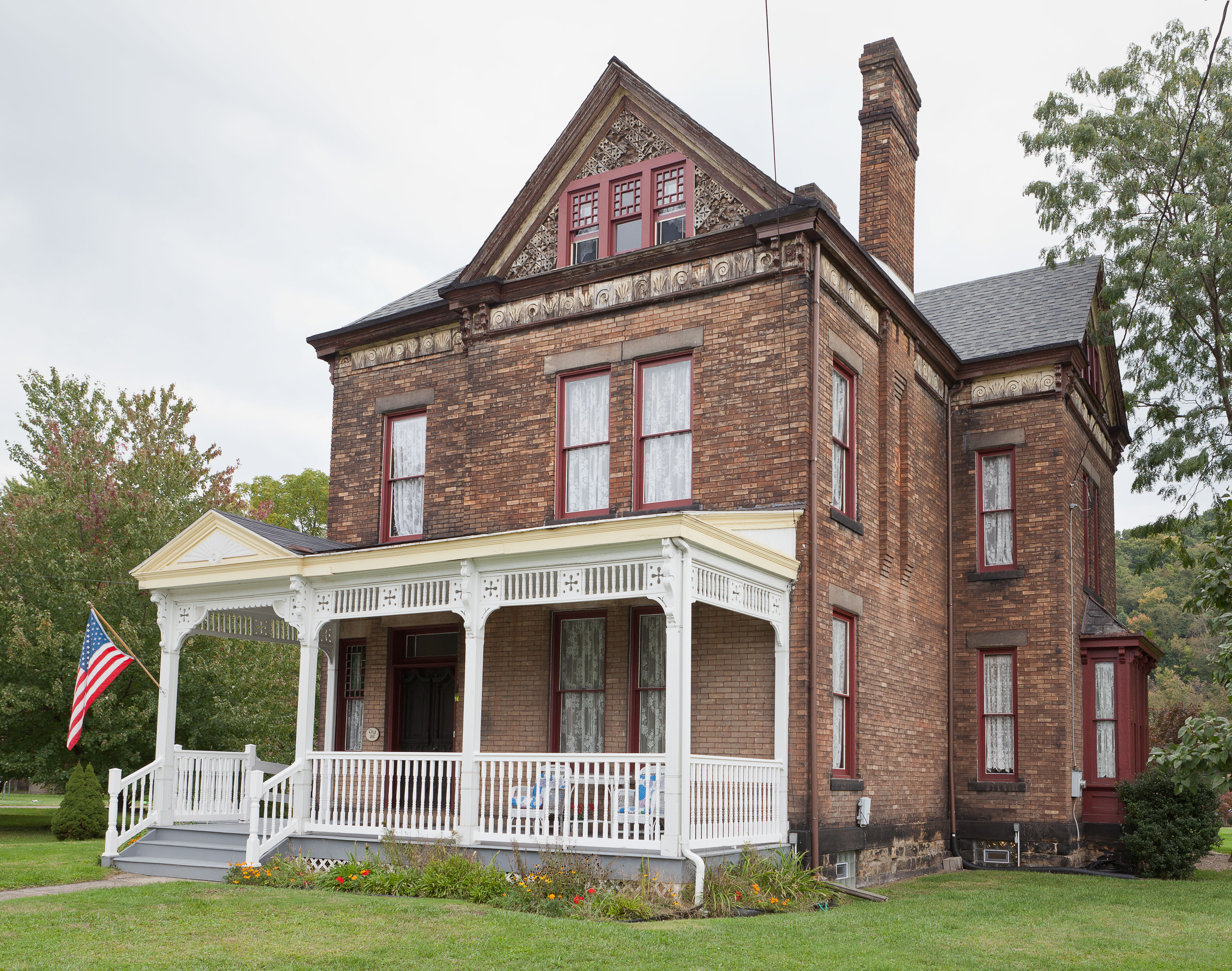
- Marshall House

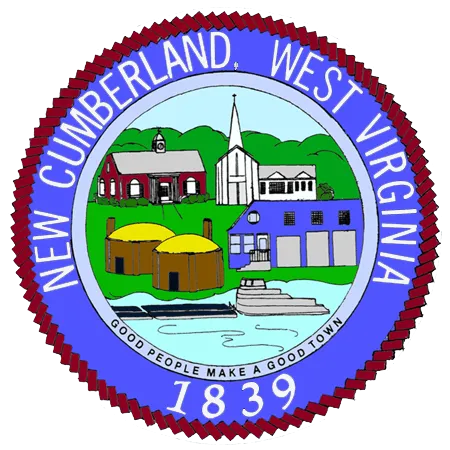
- Flag Seal
- Interactive map of New Cumberland, West Virginia
- Location within West Virginia Location within the United States
- Coordinates: 40°29′57″N 80°36′29″W
- Country: United States
- State: West Virginia
- County: Hancock
- Founded: 1839
- Incorporated: 1872 and 1891
- Named after: Cumberland, Maryland

Area
  - Total: 1.86 sq mi (4.82 km^{2})
  - Land: 1.22 sq mi (3.16 km^{2})
  - Water: 0.64 sq mi (1.66 km^{2})
- Elevation: 720 ft (220 m)

Population (2020)
  - Total: 1,020
  - Estimate (2021): 1,007
  - Density: 824.8/sq mi (318.47/km^{2})
- Time zone: UTC-5 (Eastern (EST))
  - Summer (DST): UTC-4 (EDT)
- ZIP code: 26047
- Area code: 304
- FIPS code: 54-58372
- GNIS feature ID: 1555205
- Website: www.cityofnewcumberland.net

New Cumberland is a city in and the county seat of Hancock County, West Virginia, United States. The population was 1,020 at the 2020 census. Located along the Ohio River in the northern panhandle of West Virginia, it is part of the Weirton–Steubenville metropolitan area and is near Mountaineer Casino Resort.

== History ==
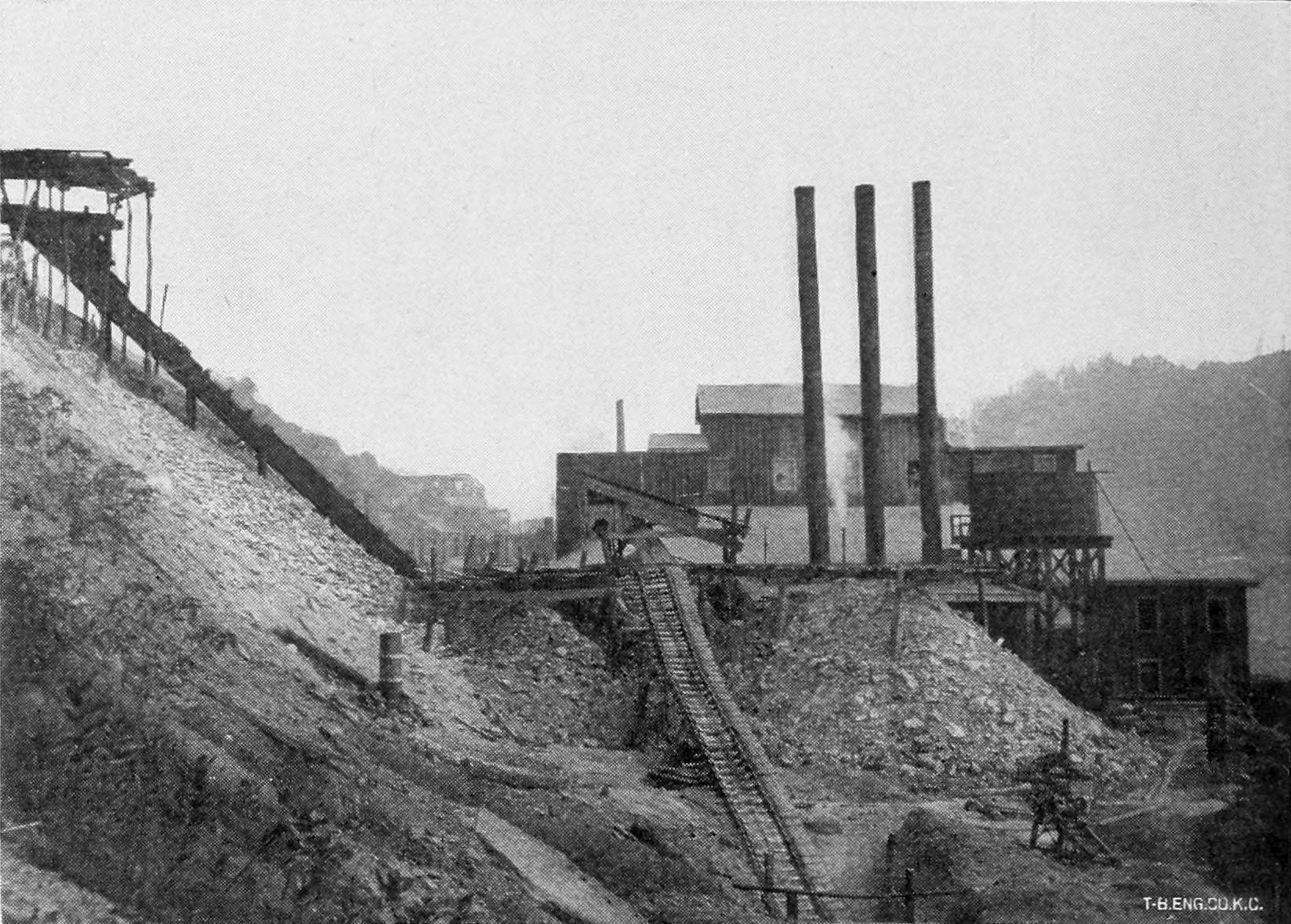
Clay mines in New Cumberland, 1907

Pioneer George Chapman settled in the area of present-day New Cumberland in 1783 or 1784 and founded Fort Chapman. In 1839, John Cuppy laid out a town at the site and named it Vernon, although it was also referred to as Cuppytown. Cuppy changed the name to New Cumberland per the requests of the earliest land buyers, naming it after Cumberland, Maryland. The town was incorporated by the West Virginia Legislature in 1872.

When Hancock County was formed in 1848, New Cumberland competed with New Manchester (at the time Fairview, and later, Pughtown) for the county seat. New Cumberland was chosen by thirteen votes in a referendum, but the already-seated courthouse in New Manchester refused to comply. In 1850, New Cumberland won a second referendum by forty-six votes and the seat was moved, but just two years later yet another referendum resulted in a New Manchester victory. In 1884, a final election resolved the matter, and New Cumberland became the permanent county seat.

Local industry in the past involved the manufacture of fire and paving brick, sewer pipe, glassware, foundry and machine-shop products, and tiling. There were also coal mines and mills for the pulverization of fire clay for use in ironworks. The First National Bank-Graham Building and Marshall House are listed on the National Register of Historic Places.

== Geography ==
New Cumberland is located at 40°29′57″N 80°36′29″W (40.499146, -80.607960).

According to the United States Census Bureau, the city has a total area of 1.86 square miles (4.82 km^{2}), of which 1.22 square miles (3.16 km^{2}) is land and 0.64 square miles (1.66 km^{2}) is water. Due to the relative proximity of the Ohio River, New Cumberland has been the victim of several floods. Notable floods include 1959, where approximately 60 families were evacuated.

=== Climate ===
This climatic region is typified by large seasonal temperature differences, with warm to hot (and often humid) summers and cold (sometimes severely cold) winters. According to the Köppen Climate Classification system, New Cumberland has a humid continental climate, abbreviated "Dfb" on climate maps.

Climate data for New Cumberland, West Virginia (1991–2020 normals; extremes 1892–present)
Month	Jan	Feb	Mar	Apr	May	Jun	Jul	Aug	Sep	Oct	Nov	Dec	Year
Record high °F (°C)	76 (24)	76 (24)	88 (31)	93 (34)	97 (36)	100 (38)	104 (40)	109 (43)	103 (39)	95 (35)	85 (29)	77 (25)	109 (43)
Mean daily maximum °F (°C)	36.8 (2.7)	39.8 (4.3)	48.7 (9.3)	62.1 (16.7)	71.9 (22.2)	79.7 (26.5)	83.6 (28.7)	82.4 (28.0)	76.1 (24.5)	64.4 (18.0)	51.8 (11.0)	41.0 (5.0)	61.5 (16.4)
Daily mean °F (°C)	28.9 (−1.7)	31.1 (−0.5)	39.0 (3.9)	50.8 (10.4)	60.7 (15.9)	69.1 (20.6)	73.5 (23.1)	72.4 (22.4)	65.9 (18.8)	54.3 (12.4)	43.1 (6.2)	33.8 (1.0)	51.9 (11.1)
Mean daily minimum °F (°C)	20.9 (−6.2)	22.4 (−5.3)	29.3 (−1.5)	39.5 (4.2)	49.4 (9.7)	58.5 (14.7)	63.3 (17.4)	62.4 (16.9)	55.7 (13.2)	44.2 (6.8)	34.3 (1.3)	26.6 (−3.0)	42.2 (5.7)
Record low °F (°C)	−20 (−29)	−23 (−31)	−15 (−26)	5 (−15)	22 (−6)	33 (1)	36 (2)	36 (2)	30 (−1)	20 (−7)	1 (−17)	−15 (−26)	−23 (−31)
Average precipitation inches (mm)	3.13 (80)	2.56 (65)	3.31 (84)	3.64 (92)	4.04 (103)	4.44 (113)	4.04 (103)	3.63 (92)	3.87 (98)	3.03 (77)	2.90 (74)	3.10 (79)	41.69 (1,059)
Source: NOAA

== Demographics ==
Historical population
Census	Pop.	Note	%±
1880	1,218		—
1890	2,305		89.2%
1900	2,198		−4.6%
1910	1,807		−17.8%
1920	1,816		0.5%
1930	2,300		26.7%
1940	2,098		−8.8%
1950	2,119		1.0%
1960	2,076		−2.0%
1970	1,865		−10.2%
1980	1,752		−6.1%
1990	1,363		−22.2%
2000	1,099		−19.4%
2010	1,103		0.4%
2020	1,020		−7.5%
2021 (est.)	1,007		−1.3%
U.S. Decennial Census

=== 2020 census ===
As of the 2020 census, New Cumberland had a population of 1,020. The median age was 49.1 years. 19.2% of residents were under the age of 18 and 23.9% of residents were 65 years of age or older. For every 100 females there were 89.6 males, and for every 100 females age 18 and over there were 89.9 males age 18 and over.

0.0% of residents lived in urban areas, while 100.0% lived in rural areas.

There were 462 households in New Cumberland, of which 22.1% had children under the age of 18 living in them. Of all households, 35.3% were married-couple households, 22.9% were households with a male householder and no spouse or partner present, and 34.0% were households with a female householder and no spouse or partner present. About 40.9% of all households were made up of individuals and 20.6% had someone living alone who was 65 years of age or older.

There were 568 housing units, of which 18.7% were vacant. The homeowner vacancy rate was 6.4% and the rental vacancy rate was 9.5%.

Racial composition as of the 2020 census
Race	Number	Percent
White	952	93.3%
Black or African American	4	0.4%
American Indian and Alaska Native	1	0.1%
Asian	0	0.0%
Native Hawaiian and Other Pacific Islander	0	0.0%
Some other race	4	0.4%
Two or more races	59	5.8%
Hispanic or Latino (of any race)	23	2.3%

=== 2010 census ===
As of the census of 2010, there were 1,103 people, 526 households, and 289 families living in the city. The population density was 904.1 inhabitants per square mile (349.1/km^{2}). There were 583 housing units at an average density of 477.9 per square mile (184.5/km^{2}). The racial makeup of the city was 97.6% White, 0.5% Asian, 0.4% from other races, and 1.5% from two or more races. Hispanic or Latino of any race were 1.4% of the population.

There were 526 households, of which 21.5% had children under the age of 18 living with them, 38.6% were married couples living together, 11.8% had a female householder with no husband present, 4.6% had a male householder with no wife present, and 45.1% were non-families. 40.5% of all households were made up of individuals, and 19.8% had someone living alone who was 65 years of age or older. The average household size was 2.10 and the average family size was 2.83.

The median age in the city was 47.3 years. 18.3% of residents were under the age of 18; 6.6% were between the ages of 18 and 24; 22% were from 25 to 44; 32.6% were from 45 to 64; and 20.5% were 65 years of age or older. The gender makeup of the city was 46.7% male and 53.3% female.

=== 2000 census ===
As of the census of 2000, there were 1,099 people, 513 households, and 286 families living in the city. The population density was 897.6 people per square mile (347.8/km^{2}). There were 568 housing units at an average density of 463.9 per square mile (179.8/km^{2}). The racial makeup of the city was 99.27% White, 0.27% Asian, 0.09% from other races, and 0.36% from two or more races. Hispanic or Latino of any race were 1.09% of the population.

There were 513 households, out of which 20.9% had children under the age of 18 living with them, 44.6% were married couples living together, 7.8% had a female householder with no husband present, and 44.1% were non-families. 39.2% of all households were made up of individuals, and 22.4% had someone living alone who was 65 years of age or older. The average household size was 2.12 and the average family size was 2.85.

In the city, the population was spread out, with 19.1% under the age of 18, 6.1% from 18 to 24, 27.2% from 25 to 44, 26.6% from 45 to 64, and 21.0% who were 65 years of age or older. The median age was 43 years. For every 100 females, there were 84.1 males. For every 100 females age 18 and over, there were 79.2 males.

The median income for a household in the city was $28,529, and the median income for a family was $37,589. Males had a median income of $30,625 versus $20,536 for females. The per capita income for the city was $18,109. About 6.2% of families and 9.5% of the population were below the poverty line, including 12.9% of those under age 18 and 7.5% of those age 65 or over.

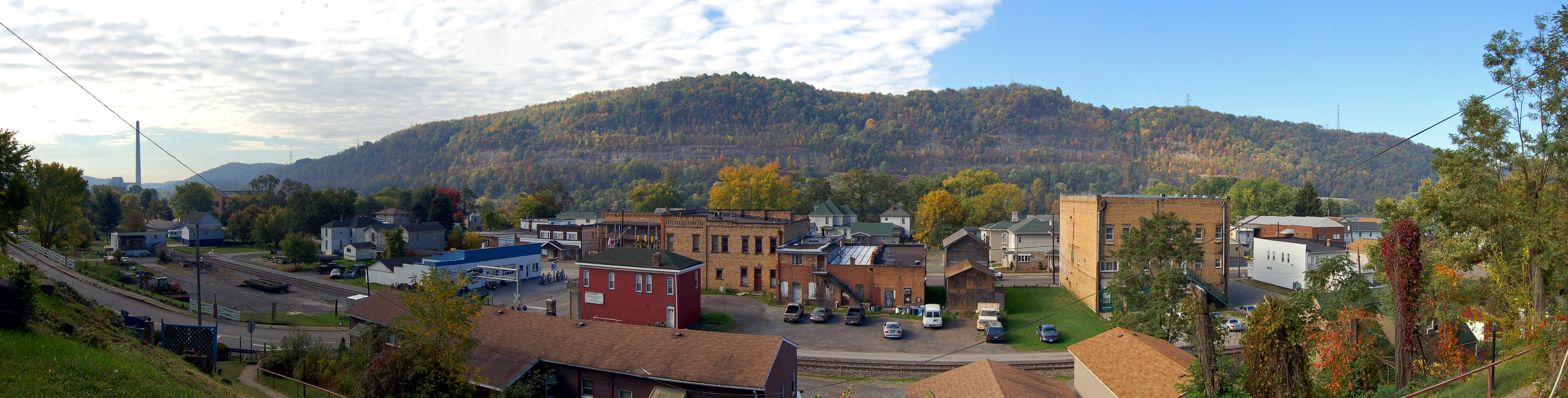
View of downtown New Cumberland from the Hancock County Courthouse

== Education ==
Children in New Cumberland are served by the public Hancock County Schools, with local students attending Oak Glen High School.

== Notable people ==
- John Bahnsen, U.S. Army brigadier general and decorated veteran of the Vietnam War
- Hugh S. Jenkins, 35th Ohio Attorney General
- Edwin F. Flowers, justice of the Supreme Court of Appeals of West Virginia
- Daniel Johnston, singer-songwriter, musician, and artist
- Oliver S. Marshall, member of the West Virginia Senate
- Deshawn L. Parker, two-time U.S. champion thoroughbred horse racing jockey
- Robert L. Ramsay, member of the U.S. House of Representatives from West Virginia's 1st district

== See also ==
- List of cities and towns along the Ohio River
