= Marshall House (New Cumberland, West Virginia) =

Historic house in West Virginia, United States

- U.S. National Register of Historic Places
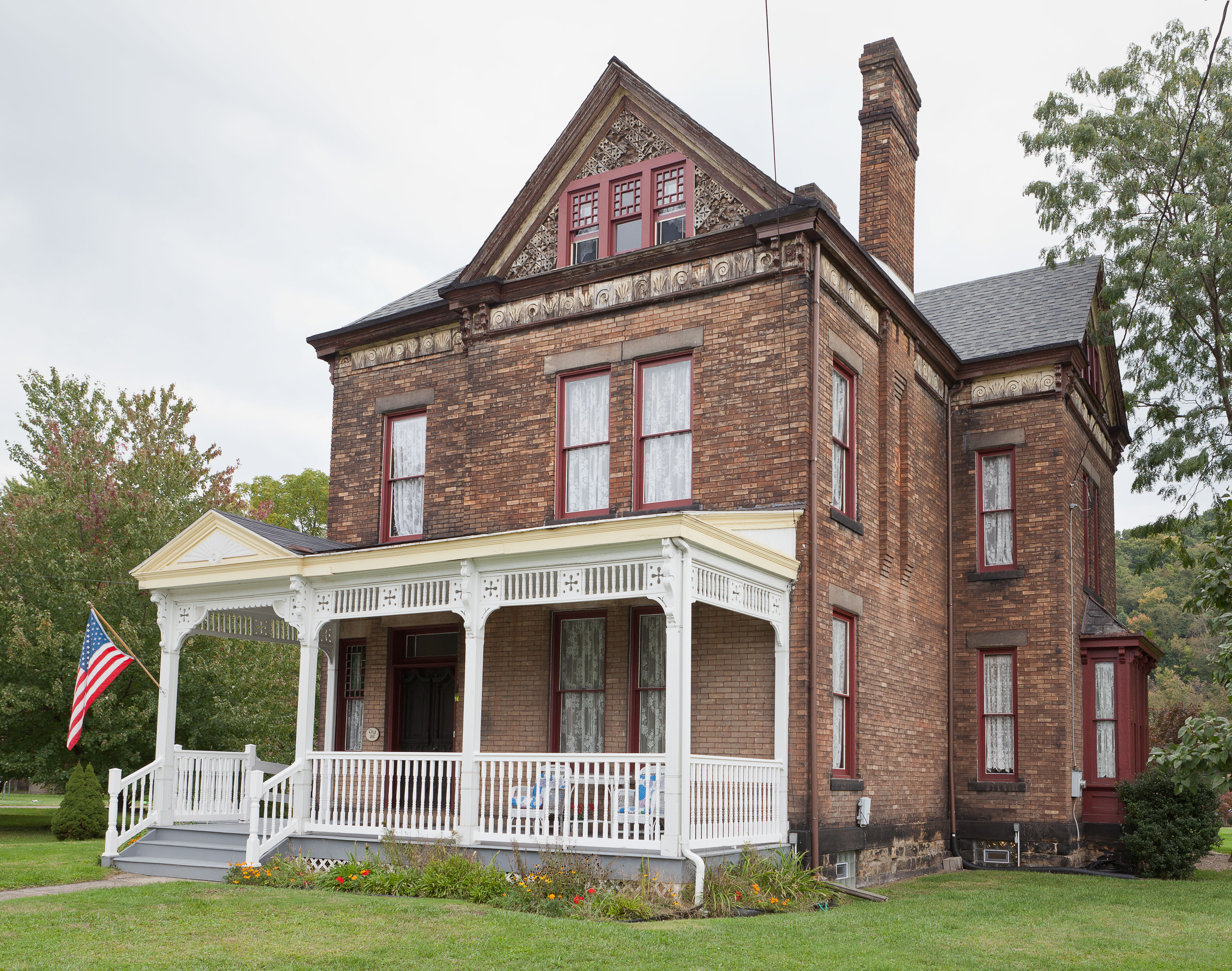
- Marshall House, September 2012

- Location within West Virginia Location within the United States
- Location: 1008 Ridge Ave., New Cumberland, West Virginia
- Coordinates: 40°29′47″N 80°36′16″W
- Area: 0.8 acres (0.32 ha)
- Built: 1887
- Architect: Smith
- Architectural style: Queen Anne
- NRHP reference No.: 01000263
- Added to NRHP: March 12, 2001

The Marshall House, also known as the McNeil House, is a historic residence in New Cumberland, West Virginia, United States. Built in 1887, it is a 2 1/2-story Queen Anne style brick dwelling. The house was built by West Virginia State Senator Oliver S. Marshall (1850–1934) and remained his home until his death. It was listed on the National Register of Historic Places in 2001. The house operates as the Hancock County Historical Museum, housing local history artifacts spanning from the American Civil War through World War II.
