= Otis Wilson =

American football player (born 1957)

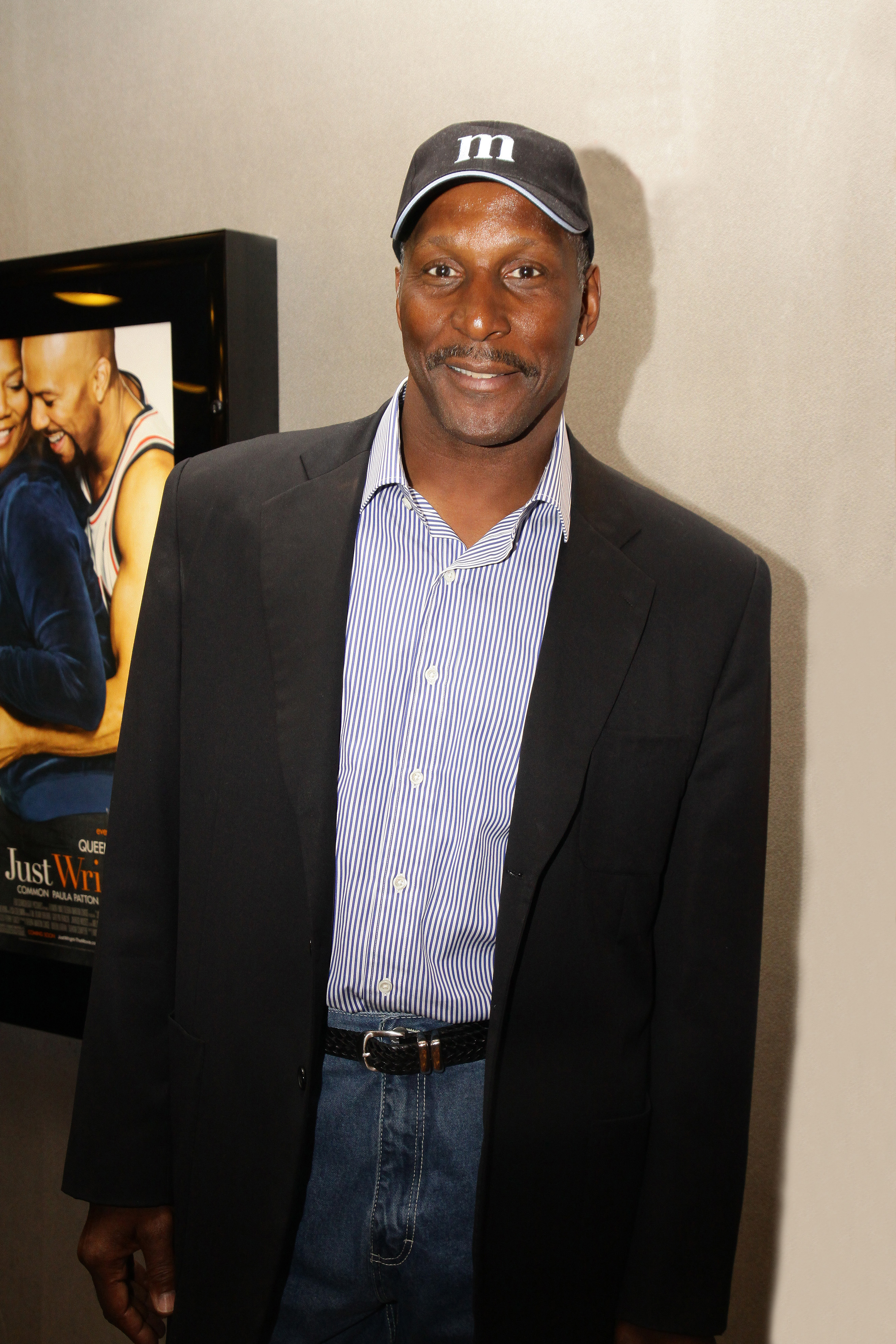
- Wilson in 2010

No. 55, 50
- Position: Linebacker

Personal information
- Born: September 15, 1957 (age 69); Brooklyn, New York, U.S.
- Listed height: 6 ft 2 in (1.88 m)
- Listed weight: 227 lb (103 kg)

Career information
- High school: Jefferson (Brooklyn, New York)
- College: Syracuse (1975); Louisville (1976–1979)
- NFL draft: 1980: 1st round, 19th overall pick

Career history
- Chicago Bears (1980–1988); Los Angeles Raiders (1989)

Awards and highlights
- Super Bowl champion (XX); Second-team All-Pro (1985); Pro Bowl (1985); 100 greatest Bears of All-Time; Second-team All-American (1979); Louisville Cardinals Ring of Honor; Kentucky Pro Football Hall of Fame (2013)

Career NFL statistics
- Sacks: 38.0
- Interceptions: 10
- Touchdowns: 2
- Stats at Pro Football Reference

Otis Ray Wilson (born September 15, 1957) is an American former professional football player who was a linebacker in the National Football League (NFL) for the Chicago Bears and the Los Angeles Raiders. He won a Super Bowl as a member of the 1985 Chicago Bears. He is also the father of former Cincinnati Bengals running back Quincy Wilson. He is married to Tina Glover Wilson.

== College career ==
After starting his college career at Syracuse University, Wilson transferred to the University of Louisville. Wilson was a three-year letter winner, from 1977 to 1979. In 1979, Wilson was a team captain and was named first-team All-American by the Sporting News. Wilson ranks second all-time in Louisville football history with 484 career tackles, and ranks fifth with 32 tackles for loss.

== Professional career ==
Wilson was selected in the first round of the 1980 NFL draft by the Chicago Bears, and went on to a nine-year career in the NFL. As a starting outside linebacker for the Bears, Wilson played on one of the most dominating defenses in football history as part of the linebacking trio with Mike Singletary and Wilber Marshall. This defense helped the Bears to win Super Bowl XX. That same year, he also made the only Pro Bowl selection of his career. He was a featured soloist of the "Shuffling Crew" in the video The Super Bowl Shuffle in 1985.

Wilson had a significant role with the famous '85 Bears. While he didn't call the plays and run the defense like fellow linebacker Mike Singletary did, he was possibly the Bears' most feared pass-rusher and the most intimidating player when he lined up in the 46 Defense. Because Singletary stayed in the middle and covered backs out of the backfield/stopped the run, and Wilber Marshall was basically a free-lancer who roamed the field, Wilson was the main blitzer in the Bears' 46. He was second on the team with 10.5 sacks in the 1985 season, and numerous times he hurried the quarterback into errant throws.

Wilson played with the Bears until 1987. Injuries kept him from playing in the 1988 season. In 1989, he signed with the Los Angeles Raiders, but played only the first game of the season and retired soon afterwards. He finished his 9-season career with 36 sacks, 8 fumble recoveries, 31 fumble return yards, 10 interceptions, 115 return yards and 2 touchdowns in 110 games.

During Super Bowl XLIV, Wilson joined other members of the 1985 Chicago Bears in resurrecting the Super Bowl Shuffle in a Boost Mobile commercial.

== Personal life ==
Otis is now focusing full-time on his nonprofit organization, The Otis Wilson Charitable Association, which provides an all-inclusive health and fitness program for at-risk youth. The organization sponsors many events to fund their programs and they are very active in the Chicago area.

Wilson's book "If These Walls Could Talk: Chicago Bears" (Triumph Books) was released in September 2017.
