= President of the West Virginia Senate =

American political office

- Lieutenant Governor of West Virginia
- Seal of West Virginia
- Incumbent; Randy Smith since January 8, 2025
- West Virginia Senate
- Status: Presiding officer
- Seat: West Virginia State Capitol, Charleston
- Appointer: West Virginia Senate
- Constituting instrument: West Virginia Constitution
- Formation: June 20, 1863; 163 years ago
- First holder: John M. Phelps
- Succession: First
- Website: www.wvlegislature.gov/Senate1/president.cfm

The president of the West Virginia Senate is a member of the West Virginia Senate who has been elected to be its president by the other senators. The current Senate president is Randy Smith, who has been in office since January 8, 2025.

In addition to serving as the Senate's presiding officer, the Senate President is also first in the line of succession to the office of governor of West Virginia (the Senate president does not succeed to that office, but rather assumes that office's powers and duties as acting governor, with the governorship remaining vacant). As stated in Article 7, Section 16 of the West Virginia Constitution: "In case of the death, conviction or impeachment, failure to qualify, resignation, or other disability of the governor, the president of the Senate shall act as governor until the vacancy is filled, or the disability removed." However, the Senate President may not always serve that role for the whole remainder of the gubernatorial term, as the constitution also states: "Whenever a vacancy shall occur in the office of governor before the first three years of the term shall have expired, a new election for governor shall take place to fill the vacancy."

The West Virginia Constitution does not create or even mention the title of lieutenant governor. However, in 2000, the West Virginia Legislature adopted West Virginia Code chapter 6A, section 1-4(b), which says "the president of the Senate shall be additionally designated the title of lieutenant governor". Earl Ray Tomblin was the first Senate president to thus have the title lieutenant governor of West Virginia.

== List ==
The presidents of the West Virginia Senate since 1863:

Democratic – 31; Republican – 23

#	Senate President	Term start	Term end	Party	Governor
1	John Phelps 1821 – August 26, 1884 (aged 63)	June 20, 1863	January 19, 1864	Republican	Arthur Boreman
2	William Stevenson March 18, 1820 – November 29, 1883 (aged 63)	January 19, 1864	January 19, 1869	Republican	Arthur Boreman
3	Daniel Farnsworth December 23, 1819 – December 5, 1892 (aged 72)	January 19, 1869	January 17, 1871	Republican	Arthur Boreman
A.	Joseph T. Hoke February 6, 1835 – July 27, 1910 (aged 75)	February 26, 1869	March 4, 1869	Republican	Daniel Farnsworth (acting)
3	Daniel Farnsworth December 23, 1819 – December 5, 1892 (aged 72)	January 19, 1869	January 17, 1871	Republican	William Stevenson
4	Lewis Baker November 11, 1832 – April 30, 1899 (aged 66)	January 17, 1871	January 16, 1872	Democratic	
4	Lewis Baker November 11, 1832 – April 30, 1899 (aged 66)	January 17, 1871	January 16, 1872	Democratic	John Jacob
5	Carlos Sperry July 28, 1832 – May 9, 1905 (aged 72)	January 16, 1872	August 22, 1872	Democratic	John Jacob
6	Daniel Johnson April 28, 1836 – December 18, 1893 (aged 57)	November 19, 1872	January 10, 1877	Democratic	John Jacob
7	Ulysses Arnett November 7, 1820 – December 1, 1880 (aged 60)	January 10, 1877	January 8, 1879	Democratic	
7	Ulysses Arnett November 7, 1820 – December 1, 1880 (aged 60)	January 10, 1877	January 8, 1879	Democratic	Henry Mathews
8	Daniel Johnson April 28, 1836 – December 18, 1893 (aged 57)	January 8, 1879	January 12, 1881	Democratic	Henry Mathews
9	Albert Summers January 1, 1824 – April 1, 1901 (aged 77)	January 12, 1881	January 10, 1883	Democratic	
9	Albert Summers January 1, 1824 – April 1, 1901 (aged 77)	January 12, 1881	January 10, 1883	Democratic	Jacob Jackson
10	Thomas Farnsworth May 17, 1829 – October 12, 1916 (aged 87)	January 10, 1883	January 14, 1885	Democratic	Jacob Jackson
11	George Price November 9, 1848 – February 6, 1938 (aged 89)	January 14, 1885	January 9, 1889	Democratic	
11	George Price November 9, 1848 – February 6, 1938 (aged 89)	January 14, 1885	January 9, 1889	Democratic	Emmanuel Watson
12	Robert Carr November 17, 1845 – May 6, 1925 (aged 79)	January 22, 1889	January 14, 1891	Democratic	
12	Robert Carr November 17, 1845 – May 6, 1925 (aged 79)	January 22, 1889	January 14, 1891	Democratic	Aretas Fleming
13	John McCreery July 31, 1845 – May 22, 1917 (aged 71)	January 14, 1891	January 11, 1893	Democratic	Aretas Fleming
14	Rankin Wiley April 6, 1853 – February 21, 1929 (aged 75)	January 11, 1893	January 9, 1895	Democratic	
14	Rankin Wiley April 6, 1853 – February 21, 1929 (aged 75)	January 11, 1893	January 9, 1895	Democratic	William MacCorkle
15	William Worley August 1, 1846 – October 7, 1928 (aged 82)	January 9, 1895	January 13, 1897	Republican	William MacCorkle
16	Nelson Whitaker November 9, 1839 – December 28, 1909 (aged 70)	January 13, 1897	January 11, 1899	Republican	
16	Nelson Whitaker November 9, 1839 – December 28, 1909 (aged 70)	January 13, 1897	January 11, 1899	Republican	George Atkinson
17	Oliver Marshall September 24, 1850 – May 19, 1934 (aged 83)	January 11, 1899	January 9, 1901	Republican	George Atkinson
18	Anthony Smith January 9, 1844 – July 10, 1927 (aged 83)	January 9, 1901	January 14, 1903	Republican	
18	Anthony Smith January 9, 1844 – July 10, 1927 (aged 83)	January 9, 1901	January 14, 1903	Republican	Albert White
19	Clark May July 14, 1869 – April 25, 1908 (aged 38)	January 14, 1903	January 11, 1905	Republican	Albert White
20	Gustavus Northcott April 4, 1861 – December 8, 1938 (aged 77)	January 11, 1905	January 9, 1907	Republican	
20	Gustavus Northcott April 4, 1861 – December 8, 1938 (aged 77)	January 11, 1905	January 9, 1907	Republican	William Dawson
21	Joseph McDermott July 28, 1871 – December 12, 1930 (aged 59)	January 9, 1907	January 13, 1909	Republican	William Dawson
22	Lewis Forman January 7, 1855 – January 3, 1933 (aged 77)	January 13, 1909	January 11, 1911	Republican	
22	Lewis Forman January 7, 1855 – January 3, 1933 (aged 77)	January 13, 1909	January 11, 1911	Republican	William Glasscock
23	Robert F. Kidd February 11, 1853 – June 8, 1930 (aged 77)	January 17, 1911	January 30, 1911	Democratic	William Glasscock
24	Henry Hatfield September 15, 1875 – October 13, 1962 (aged 87)	January 30, 1911	January 24, 1913	Republican	William Glasscock
25	Samuel Woods August 31, 1856 – June 1, 1937 (aged 80)	January 24, 1913	January 13, 1915	Democratic	
25	Samuel Woods August 31, 1856 – June 1, 1937 (aged 80)	January 24, 1913	January 13, 1915	Democratic	Henry Hatfield
26	Edward England September 29, 1869 – September 9, 1934 (aged 64)	January 13, 1915	January 10, 1917	Republican	Henry Hatfield
27	Wells Goodykoontz June 3, 1872 – March 2, 1944 (aged 71)	January 10, 1917	January 8, 1919	Republican	
27	Wells Goodykoontz June 3, 1872 – March 2, 1944 (aged 71)	January 10, 1917	January 8, 1919	Republican	John Cornwell
28	Charles Sinsel June 5, 1864 – December 8, 1923 (aged 59)	January 8, 1919	January 12, 1921	Republican	John Cornwell
29	Gohen Arnold January 5, 1885 – June 9, 1939 (aged 54)	January 12, 1921	January 10, 1923	Republican	
29	Gohen Arnold January 5, 1885 – June 9, 1939 (aged 54)	January 12, 1921	January 10, 1923	Republican	Ephraim Morgan
30	Harry Schaffer January 22, 1885 – July 3, 1971 (aged 86)	January 10, 1923	January 14, 1925	Republican	Ephraim Morgan
31	Charles Coffman August 30, 1875 – August 15, 1929 (aged 53)	January 14, 1925	April 15, 1925	Republican	Ephraim Morgan
32	Montezuma White September 6, 1872 – May 10, 1945 (aged 72)	April 15, 1925	January 11, 1933	Republican	
32	Montezuma White September 6, 1872 – May 10, 1945 (aged 72)	April 15, 1925	January 11, 1933	Republican	Howard Gore
32	Montezuma White September 6, 1872 – May 10, 1945 (aged 72)	April 15, 1925	January 11, 1933	Republican	William Conley
33	Albert Mathews July 31, 1872 – December 5, 1958 (aged 86)	January 11, 1933	January 9, 1935	Democratic	
33	Albert Mathews July 31, 1872 – December 5, 1958 (aged 86)	January 11, 1933	January 9, 1935	Democratic	Herman Kump
34	Charles Hodges September 27, 1892 – May 1, 1968 (aged 75)	January 9, 1935	January 11, 1939	Democratic	
34	Charles Hodges September 27, 1892 – May 1, 1968 (aged 75)	January 9, 1935	January 11, 1939	Democratic	Homer Holt
35	William LaFon March 8, 1888 – February 4, 1941 (aged 52)	January 11, 1939	January 8, 1941	Democratic	Homer Holt
36	Byron Randolph June 12, 1906 – November 7, 1979 (aged 73)	January 8, 1941	January 13, 1943	Democratic	Matthew Neely
37	James Paull May 3, 1901 – March 8, 1983 (aged 81)	January 13, 1943	January 10, 1945	Democratic	Matthew Neely
38	Arnold Vickers August 8, 1908 – December 25, 1967 (aged 59)	January 10, 1945	January 12, 1949	Democratic	Clarence Meadows
39	W. Broughton Johnston May 21, 1905 – August 24, 1978 (aged 73)	January 12, 1949	January 14, 1953	Democratic	Okey Patteson
40	Ralph Bean December 15, 1912 – June 7, 1978 (aged 65)	January 14, 1953	January 11, 1961	Democratic	William Marland
40	Ralph Bean December 15, 1912 – June 7, 1978 (aged 65)	January 14, 1953	January 11, 1961	Democratic	Cecil Underwood
41	Howard Carson April 30, 1910 – August 9, 1994 (aged 84)	January 11, 1961	January 8, 1969	Democratic	Wally Barron
41	Howard Carson April 30, 1910 – August 9, 1994 (aged 84)	January 11, 1961	January 8, 1969	Democratic	Hulett Smith
42	Lloyd Jackson May 30, 1918 – October 29, 2011 (aged 93)	January 8, 1969	January 13, 1971	Democratic	Arch Moore
43	E. Hansford McCourt April 21, 1909 – August 3, 1992 (aged 83)	January 13, 1971	January 10, 1973	Democratic	Arch Moore
44	William Brotherton April 17, 1926 – April 6, 1997 (aged 70)	January 10, 1973	January 14, 1981	Democratic	
44	William Brotherton April 17, 1926 – April 6, 1997 (aged 70)	January 10, 1973	January 14, 1981	Democratic	Jay Rockefeller
45	Warren McGraw May 10, 1939 – June 14, 2023 (aged 84)	January 14, 1981	January 9, 1985	Democratic	Jay Rockefeller
46	Dan Tonkovich April 17, 1946 – February 10, 2002 (aged 55)	January 9, 1985	January 11, 1989	Democratic	Arch Moore
47	Larry Tucker April 11, 1935 – November 16, 2016 (aged 81)	January 11, 1989	September 7, 1989	Democratic	Arch Moore
48	Keith Burdette; April 27, 1955 (age 71)	September 12, 1989	January 3, 1995	Democratic	
48	Keith Burdette; April 27, 1955 (age 71)	September 12, 1989	January 3, 1995	Democratic	Gaston Caperton
49	Earl Ray Tomblin; March 15, 1952 (age 74)	January 3, 1995	November 13, 2011	Democratic	
49	Earl Ray Tomblin; March 15, 1952 (age 74)	January 3, 1995	November 13, 2011	Democratic	Cecil Underwood
49	Earl Ray Tomblin; March 15, 1952 (age 74)	January 3, 1995	November 13, 2011	Democratic	Bob Wise
49	Earl Ray Tomblin; March 15, 1952 (age 74)	January 3, 1995	November 13, 2011	Democratic	Joe Manchin
50	Jeff Kessler; November 16, 1955 (age 70)	November 15, 2010	November 14, 2011	Democratic	Earl Ray Tomblin
50	Jeff Kessler; November 16, 1955 (age 70)	November 14, 2011	January 14, 2015	Democratic	Earl Ray Tomblin
51	Bill Cole; May 16, 1956 (age 70)	January 14, 2015	January 11, 2017	Republican	Earl Ray Tomblin
52	Mitch Carmichael; April 15, 1960 (age 66)	January 11, 2017	January 13, 2021	Republican	Jim Justice
53	Craig Blair; October 17, 1959 (age 66)	January 13, 2021	January 8, 2025	Republican	Jim Justice
54	Randy Smith; March 3, 1960 (age 66)	January 8, 2025	Incumbent	Republican	Patrick Morrisey

== See also ==
- West Virginia Senate
- List of current United States lieutenant governors
- List of West Virginia state legislatures
