= E. Hansford McCourt =

American politician (1909-1992)

Hans McCourt
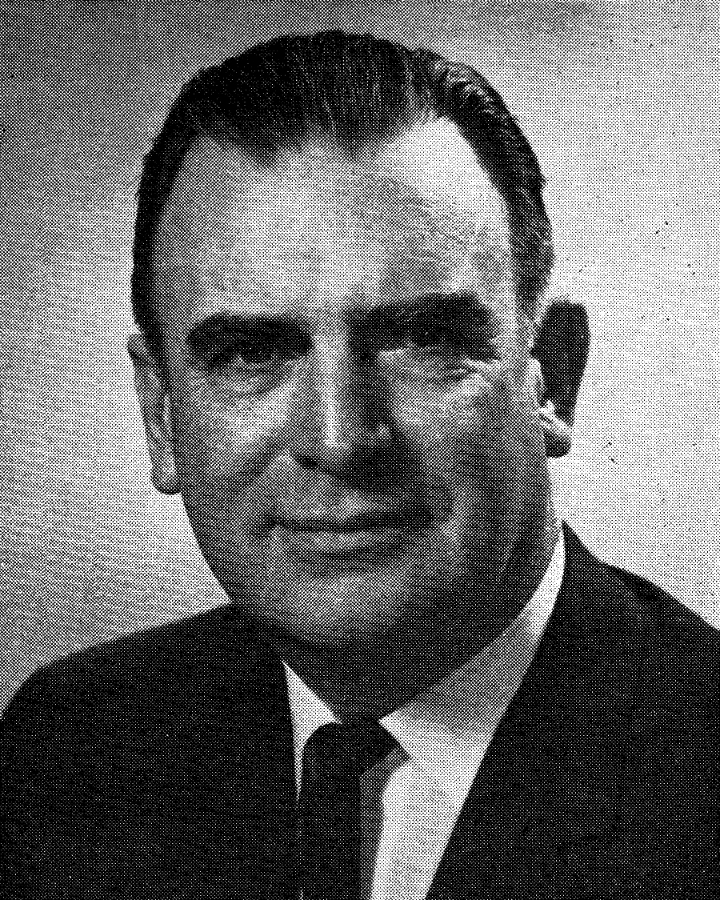

42nd President of the West Virginia Senate
- In office 1971–1973
- Preceded by: Lloyd G. Jackson
- Succeeded by: William T. Brotherton Jr.

Member of the West Virginia Senate from the 12th district
- In office December 1, 1956 – December 1, 1972
- Preceded by: Fred C. Allen
- Succeeded by: Richard H. Benson

Member of the West Virginia House of Delegates from Webster County
- In office December 1, 1952 – December 1, 1954
- Preceded by: William S. Wysong
- Succeeded by: Orvan Hammon

Personal details
- Born: Eskridge Hansford McCourt; April 21, 1909 Webster Springs, West Virginia, U.S.
- Died: August 3, 1992 (aged 83) Webster Springs, West Virginia, U.S.
- Party: Democratic
- Spouse: Georgie Kidd (m. 1936)

Military service
- Allegiance: United States
- Branch/service: United States Army
- Battles/wars: World War II

Eskridge Hansford McCourt (April 21, 1909 – August 3, 1992) was the Democratic President of the West Virginia Senate from Webster County and served from 1971 to 1973.

Political offices
Preceded by Lloyd G. Jackson	President of the WV Senate; 1971–1973	Succeeded by William T. Brotherton Jr.
