= Rankin Wiley Jr. =

American politician

Rankin Wiley

President of the Senate of West Virginia
- In office 1893–1895
- Preceded by: John W. McCreery
- Succeeded by: William G. Worley

Member of the West Virginia Senate

Personal details
- Born: April 6, 1853 Newport, Kentucky, U.S.
- Died: February 21, 1929 (aged 75) Point Pleasant, West Virginia, U.S.
- Party: Democratic
- Spouse(s): Blanche Cantrell, Ella
- Profession: attorney

Rankin Wiley Jr. (1853–1929) was the Democratic President of the West Virginia Senate from Mason County and served from 1893 to 1895. He died in 1929 of a cerebral hemorrhage.

Political offices
Preceded by John W. McCreery	President of the WV Senate; 1893–1895	Succeeded by William G. Worley
