= William T. Brotherton Jr. =

American judge

William Thurlow Weed Brotherton Jr. (April 17, 1926 – April 6, 1997) was the Democratic president of the West Virginia Senate from Kanawha County and served from 1973 to 1981. He was a justice of the West Virginia Supreme Court from 1984 until 1995, and served as chief justice in 1989 and 1994. Brotherton served a total of six terms in the West Virginia House of Delegates and five terms in the state senate between 1952 and 1980.

== Early life and education ==
William Thurlow Weed Brotherton Jr. was born in Charleston, West Virginia, on April 17, 1926. During World War II era, Brotherton served in the United States Navy. He graduated from Washington and Lee University in 1947.

== Notes ==
Political offices
Preceded by E. Hansford McCourt	President of the West Virginia Senate; 1977–1981	Succeeded by Warren McGraw
Legal offices
Preceded by Sam R. Harshbarger	Justice for the Supreme Court of Appeals of West Virginia; 1985–1995	Succeeded by Joseph P. Albright
