= Hancock County Schools =

School district in West Virginia, United States

Location
- Hancock County, West Virginia

District information
- Type: Public
- Superintendent: Walter Saunders
- School board: Melissa Bane; Chris Gillette; Randy Swartzmiller; Tiffany Gale
- Chair of the board: Jeff Woofter
- NCES District ID: 5400450 5400450

Other information
- Website: boe.hancock.k12.wv.us

Hancock County Schools is the operating school district within Hancock County, West Virginia.

== Schools ==
The following schools are in Hancock County Schools:

=== Career Center ===
- John D. Rockefeller Career Center

=== High Schools ===
- Oak Glen High School
- Weir High School

=== Middle Schools ===
- Oak Glen Middle School
- Weir Middle School

=== Elementary Schools ===
- A. T. Allison Elementary School
- New Manchester Elementary School
- Weirton Elementary

=== Other ===
- Hancock Co Alternative Learning Center
