= Ralph J. Bean =

American politician

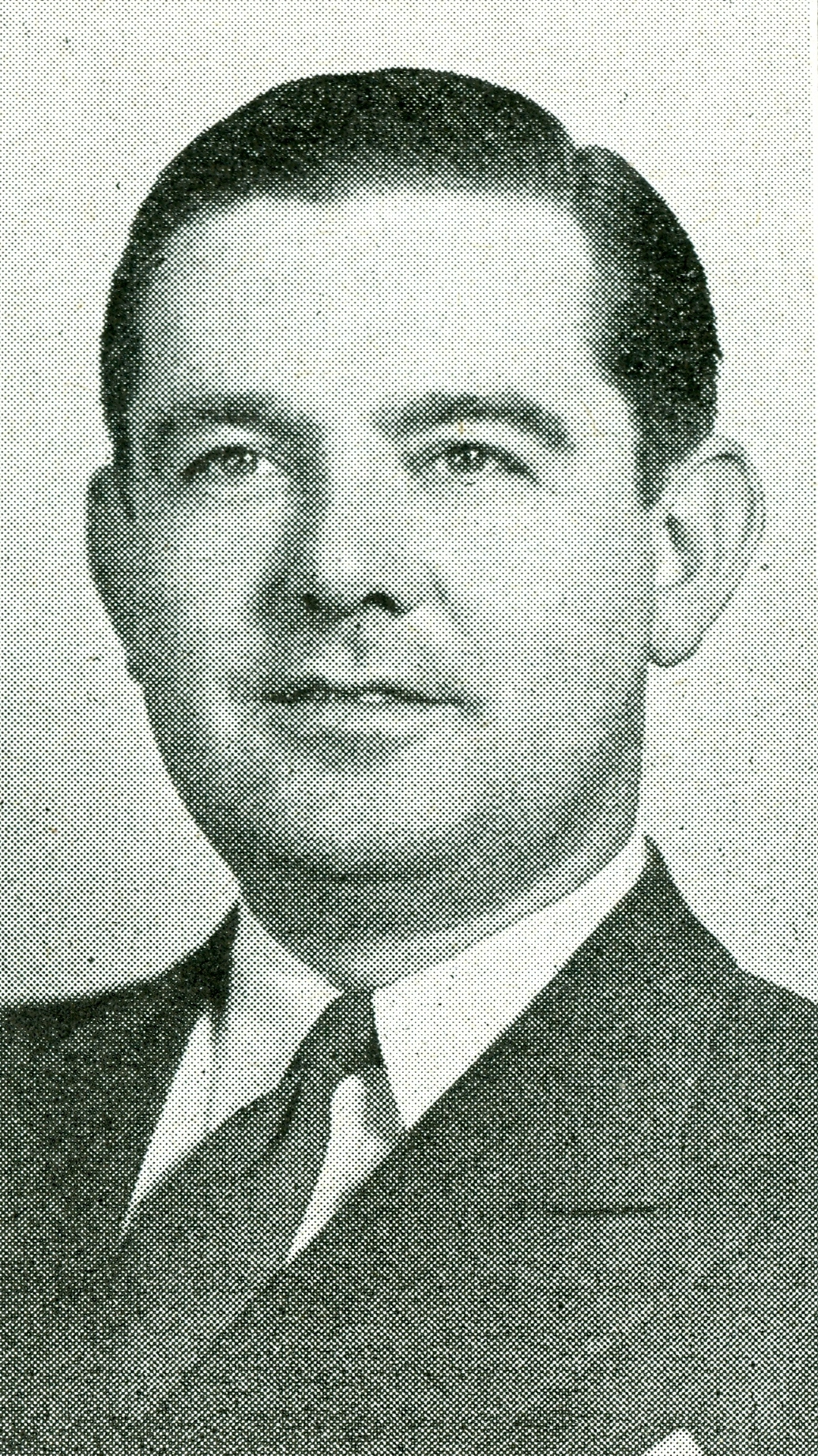

Ralph Jady Bean (December 15, 1912 – June 7, 1978) was the Democratic President of the West Virginia Senate from Hardy County and served from 1953 to 1961.

Political offices
Preceded by W. Broughton Johnston	President of the WV Senate; 1953–1961	Succeeded by Howard W. Carson
