= M. Z. White =

American politician (1872–1945)

Montezuma Z. White
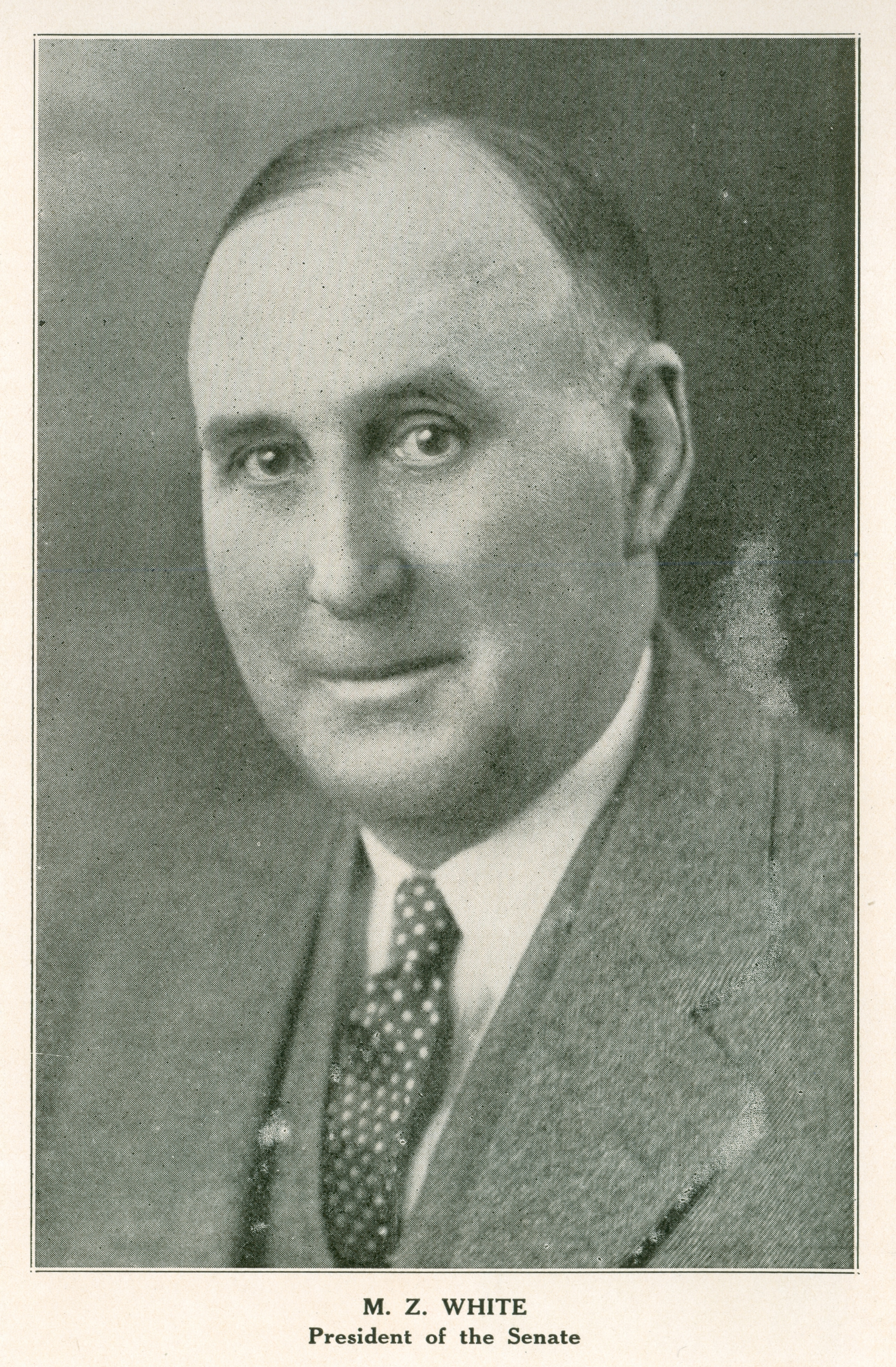

President of the Senate of West Virginia
- In office 1925–1933
- Preceded by: Charles G. Coffman
- Succeeded by: A.G. Mathews

Member of the West Virginia Senate for the 6th District

Personal details
- Born: September 6, 1872 Deep Valley, Greene County, Pennsylvania, U.S.
- Died: May 10, 1945 (aged 72) Williamson, West Virginia, U.S.
- Party: Republican
- Profession: banker

Montezuma Z. White (September 6, 1872 – May 10, 1945) was the Republican President West Virginia Senate from Tyler County and served from 1925 to 1933.

Political offices
Preceded by Charles G. Coffman	President of the WV Senate; 1925–1933	Succeeded by A.G. Mathews
