= Lloyd G. Jackson II =

American lawyer and politician

Member of the West Virginia Senate from the 7th district
- In office December 1, 1994 – December 1, 2002
- Preceded by: Sammy D. Dalton
- Succeeded by: Tracy Dempsey
- In office December 1, 1986 – December 1, 1990
- Preceded by: J. Robert Rogers
- Succeeded by: Sammy D. Dalton

Personal details
- Born: Lloyd George Jackson II; July 23, 1952 (age 74) Huntington, West Virginia, United States
- Party: Democratic
- Spouse: Trina Powell (m. 1984)
- Parent: Lloyd G. Jackson (father)
- Education: West Virginia University

Lloyd George Jackson II (born July 23, 1952) is an American lawyer and politician. The son of Lloyd G. Jackson, he also served in the West Virginia Senate. He ran for Governor in 2004, coming in second in the Democratic primary behind Secretary of State Joe Manchin.
