= George E. Price =

American politician (1848–1938)

President of the Senate of West Virginia
- In office 1885–1889
- Preceded by: Thomas J. Farnsworth
- Succeeded by: Robert S. Carr

Member of the West Virginia Senate

Personal details
- Born: George Edmund Price; November 9, 1848 near Moorefield, Virginia, U.S.
- Died: February 6, 1938 (aged 89) Charleston, West Virginia, U.S.
- Party: Democratic
- Education: Georgetown University
- Profession: attorney

George Edmund Price (November 9, 1848 – February 6, 1938) was the Democratic President of the West Virginia Senate from Mineral County and served from 1885 to 1889.

Political offices
| Preceded by Thomas J. Farnsworth | President of the WV Senate; 1885–1889 | Succeeded by Robert S. Carr |
