= Charles G. Coffman =

American politician

President of the Senate of West Virginia
- In office 1925
- Preceded by: Harry G. Shaffer
- Succeeded by: M. Z. White

Member of the West Virginia Senate for the 13th District

Personal details
- Born: August 30, 1875 Dola, Harrison County, West Virginia, U.S.
- Died: August 15, 1929 (aged 53) Clarksburg, West Virginia, U.S.
- Party: Republican
- Spouse: Alma Haymaker
- Profession: attorney

Charles G. Coffman (August 30, 1875 – August 15, 1929) was the Republican President of the West Virginia Senate from Harrison County and served from 1925 to 1925. He died in 1929.

Political offices
Preceded by Harry G. Shaffer	President of the WV Senate; 1925–1925	Succeeded by M.Z. White
