= Clark W. May =

American politician from West Virginia (1869–1908)

President of the Senate of West Virginia
- In office 1903–1905
- Preceded by: Anthony Smith
- Succeeded by: Gustavus A. Northcott

Member of the West Virginia Senate

Attorney General of West Virginia
- In office 1905–1908
- Governor: William M. O. Dawson
- Preceded by: Romeo H. Freer
- Succeeded by: William G. Conley

Personal details
- Born: July 14, 1869 Griffithsville, West Virginia, U.S.
- Died: April 25, 1908 (aged 38) West Virginia, U.S.
- Party: Republican
- Profession: attorney

Clark W. May (July 14, 1869 – April 25, 1908) was an American politician. He was a member of the West Virginia Senate from Lincoln County and served from 1903 to 1905. He was a member of the Republican Party. He served for a time as president of the West Virginia Senate. He died in 1908 of complications of a leg amputation that he received after an accident in which he fell from a carriage.

Political offices
Preceded by Anthony Smith	President of the WV Senate; 1903–1905	Succeeded by Gustavus A. Northcott
Legal offices
Preceded by Romeo H. Freer	Attorney General of West Virginia; 1905–1908	Succeeded by William G. Conley
