= Gohen C. Arnold =

American politician

Gohen C. Arnold was an American politician. He was the Republican President of the West Virginia Senate from Upshur County and served from 1921 to 1922.

Political offices
Preceded by Charles A. Sinsel	President of the West Virginia Senate; 1921–1922	Succeeded by Harry G. Shaffer
