= Weir High School =

Public high school in Weirton, West Virginia

Location
- 100 Red Rider Road; Weirton, Hancock, WV 26062; United States; 40°24′24″N 80°34′36″W

Information
- School type: Public High School
- Opened: 1916
- Status: Operating
- Principal: Sean Blumette
- Teaching staff: 41.00 (FTE)
- Grades: 9-12
- Enrollment: 597 (2024- 2025)
- Student to teacher ratio: 13.90
- Education system: Hancock County Schools
- Language: English
- Schedule: Semester
- Hours in school day: 7 hours
- Colors: Red and black
- Athletics conference: WVSSAC AAA
- Sports: 13 Sports, 20 Varsity Teams
- Mascot: The Red Rider
- Team name: The Red Riders
- Rival: Brooke High School, Oak Glen High School
- Accreditation: National Blue Ribbon School
- Publication: The Looking Glass
- Newspaper: The Red Rider Review
- Yearbook: Weirite
- Website: whs.hancock.k12.wv.us

Weir High School is a secondary public high school in the city of Weirton, West Virginia. It was established in 1916. Today, Weir High School is home to roughly 600 students in grades 9 through 12. It is a part of the Hancock County Schools. The school has been named a school of excellence and a national blue ribbon school. Its curriculum is broad and consists of career clusters designed to help students determine a path of higher education.

== History ==
The original Weir High School opened its doors in what is now known as downtown Weirton, West Virginia, in 1916. At this time, however, the school was known as Central High School, for its students were from each of the unincorporated towns in the county. By then Hollidays Cove and two other outlying areas, Weirton Heights and Marland Heights surrounding the "Weir–Cove" area were growing at an astounding rate. In a 1937 article in Life the town of Weirton was noted as being the largest unincorporated town in the United States, with a vibrant community developed by Ernest T. Weir, including a swimming pool, golf course, and football stadium for Weir High School.

== Faculty and students ==
=== Faculty ===
The administration of Weir High School consists of one principal, two assistant principals, 46 faculty members, two guidance counselors, and one Prevention Resource Officer (PRO). According to data from the 2008-2009 school year, the pupil to administrator ration is 225.7 to 1. For teachers, 9.8% of teachers have attained a bachelor's degree, 33.3% have a bachelor's degree + 15 (meaning, they have attained an additional 15 hours of coursework over the bachelor's degree level), 3.9% have a master's degree, 3.9% a master's + 15, 9.8 a master's + 30 (30 additional class hours over a master's degree), and 39.2% of teachers have a masters + 45 (45 additional hours of coursework, but not at a doctorate level). There is one teacher who has achieved doctorate standing. Additionally, the student to teacher ratio is approximately 15:1. The average amount of experience for professional staff members is 21.5 years.

=== Student demographics ===
According to the 2008-2009 No Child Left Behind report card, the enrollment of Weir High School was 677. Of these 677, 30.58% are considered low-income (compared to 49.93% statewide). Likewise, 91.73% of students identify as white. The attendance rate is 93.64% and 97.18% of students graduate. The number of graduates were 172 with a dropout rate of 3.0%. The average class size is 19.2 students.

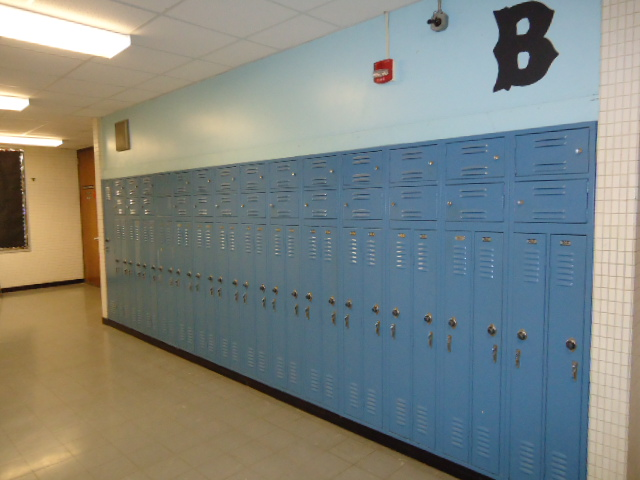
Student Lockers in one of the academic buildings of Weir High School

== Curriculum ==
The curriculum for Hancock County School System consists of required classes and credits in order to graduate. There are two career paths that students must choose from: skilled or professional. Students in the skilled path will take classes that will help them enter the workforce or attend a vocational or technical school upon graduation. Students in the professional career path will choose a cluster whose classes will prepare them for a four-year degree program.

=== Graduation requirements ===
Students at Weir High School must complete five years of reading and language arts, attain four credits in mathematics, three credits of science, four credits of social science, one credit of physical education, one credit of health, and one credit in the fine arts. Additionally, students enrolled in the professional pathway must attain a fourth science credit, two credits of the same foreign language (offered in Spanish and French, and American Sign Language), and one credit of a course in their concentration. Likewise, these students may take six elective credits.

=== Clusters ===
There are six career clusters which students are able to choose from for their education. They include Business and Marketing, Fine Arts/Humanities, Human Services, Engineering/Technology, Health, and Science/Natural resources. Students are not locked into these clusters, and they can change career clusters by visiting their guidance counselor.

=== Advanced Placement Courses ===
Students are able to choose from a number of Advanced Placement courses, which they can receive dual credit through the West Virginia Northern Community College. Courses currently offered include: English Literature and Composition, Calculus, Biology, Chemistry, Psychology, and US History. These courses are offered as a continuation of the founding principles; however, students are not required to take the Advanced Placement exam. This has resulted in the Advance Placement ratio being 1% for the school.

== 2008-2009 Report Card ==
As part of the No Child Left Behind Act passed by the United States Congress, Weir High School and other schools nationwide are required to publish data regarding student populations and demographics and test scores.

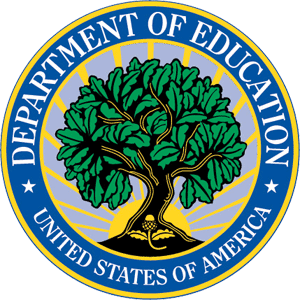
Seal for the Government's No Child Left Behind Act

=== Graduating class statistics ===
The average size of a graduating class is 170 students. 97.2% of students graduate from Weir High School. Of these, 55% attend a 4-year college/university, 16% attend a 3-year College/Jr. University, 8% enter the work force, 4% attend business/tech schools, 3% enlist in military service. Additionally, 21% of the student body are special education students, 12% of students are on reduced lunch and 28% of students are on free lunch.

=== Standardized testing results ===
==== ACT ====
Approximately 63.4% of students at Weir High School take the American College Test (ACT). This is compared to 63% of Hancock County School District students, as well as 60.3% of students statewide. The Average composite score of the exam, on a 36-point scale, is 20.6. This is consistent with the county and statewide achievements of 20.4 and 20.7, respectively.

==== SAT ====
According to the No Child Left Behind Report Card, 18.6% of students take the SAT, 5% higher than the rest of the county and 3% higher than the statewide average. The average score in Critical Reading is 485, Math is 473, and Writing is 497. This equals a composite score of 1455 out of a possible 2400. County and statewide, the average composite scores are 1440 and 1465 respectively.

==== AP ====
For 2008-2009, no students in grades ten or eleven took advanced placement (AP) exams. The same statistic exists for the county; however, statewide 2.3% of sophomores and 17% of juniors take and pass Advanced Placement exams. Weir High School, 1.1% of graduating seniors partook in the exams, which accounts for 0.6% of students in Hancock County who also take the exams. This is compared to West Virginia's average of 20% of students who take the exams.

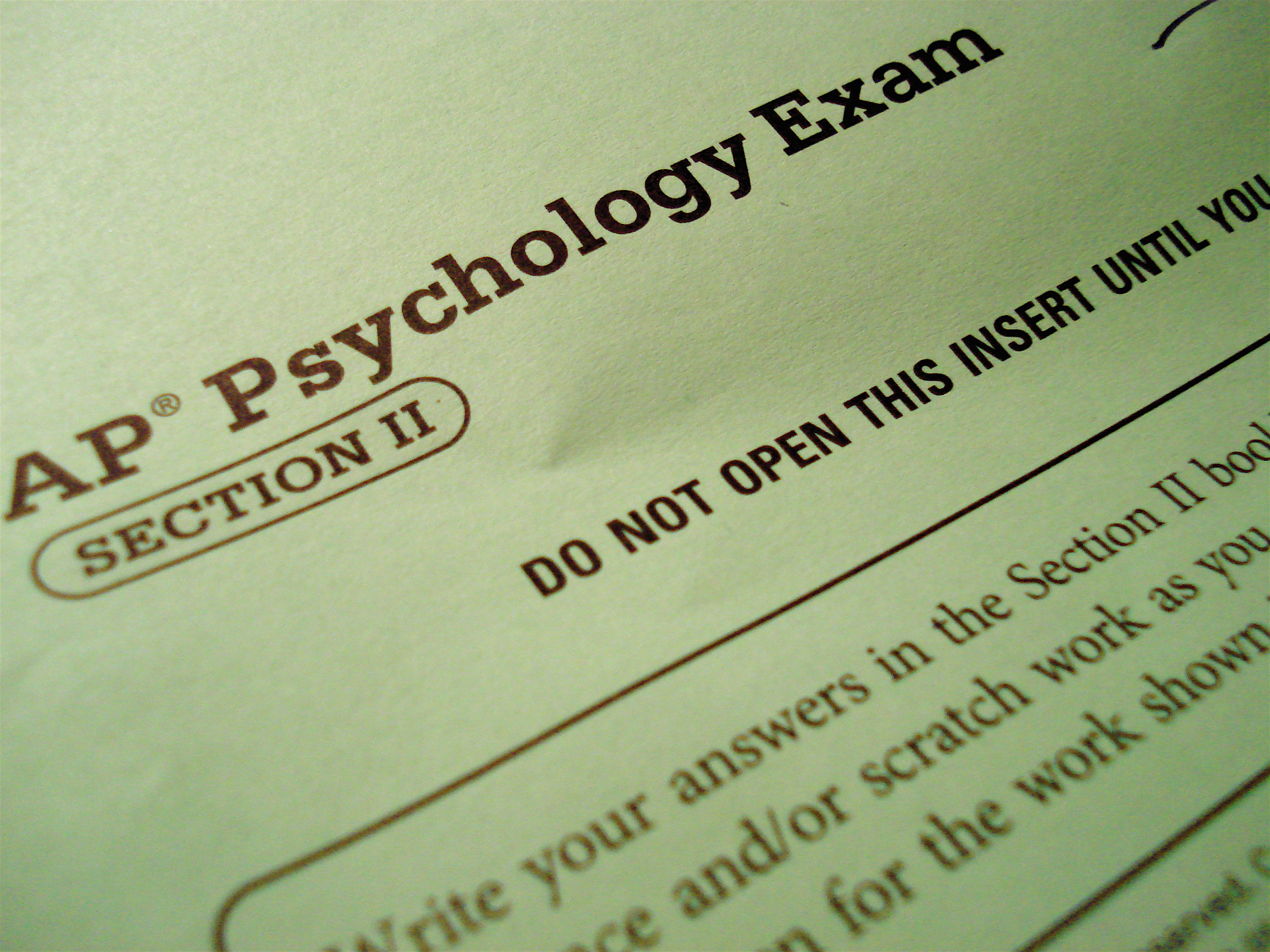
Students in Weir High School have the opportunity to take AP Exams in May of each year

==== WESTEST ====
The West Virginia Department of Education's aptitude and proficiency test (WESTEST), is given annually to students in grades 3-11. For the 2008-2009 school year, Weir High School students achieved an overall 59.5% proficiency of mastery or above in Reading/Language Arts and a 73.5% mastery in Math. County-wide, 63.7% of students were proficient in Reading/Language Arts and 67.9% achieved mastery or higher in Math. Statewide, these numbers were 58.8% and 59.5% respectably. Additionally, the state's target for proficiency is 45% in Reading/Language Arts and 48% for Mathematics.

== Extra-curricular activities ==
Weir High School has a number of co-curricular activities and athletic teams, with faculty members and volunteers who sponsor these programs.

=== Co-curricular ===
Weir High School is home to a number of clubs and organizations who perform hundreds of hours of community service annually. They include the following:

Key Club is a part of the world's largest student-led service organization. The Weir High School Key Club is sponsored by the Kiwanis Club or Weirton and participates annually in Trick or Treat for UNICEF, various events with the Hancock County Sheltered Workshop, the Weirton Geriatric Health Complex. Additionally, the club is known throughout the state and the world and annually attend both District and International Conventions.

National Honor Society is a part of a larger national organization. Membership is awarded by invitation once an individual completes five semesters at Weir High School. Members must maintain a 3.3 GPA and perform 45 hours of community service by graduation.

Hi-Y and Tri-Hi-Y is a part of "High School YMCA". Membership to Hi-Y is extended to males, however, they work closely with members of the Tri-Hi-Y (the sister organization). The Hi-Y participates in different fundraisers throughout the year. One of their biggest events is a Halloween Party for the youth of Weirton.

Academic Games The Weir High School Academic Games teams are a part of the National Academic Games Tournament (NAGT). Members compete in academically stimulating games in English, Social Studies, Math, and Logic. Annually, they participate in the National Tournament. Recent tournaments have been held in Georgia, West Virginia, and Tennessee.

Interact is sponsored by the Rotary Club of Weirton. Its members participate in community service projects throughout the city of Weirton, as well as hold a number of events for school spirit.

RAZE is an organization which exists solely in West Virginia. Over 150 schools throughout the state participate in preventing the use and abuse of tobacco. They provide teens throughout the state with vital information about the harms of tobacco use.

Environmental Science The environmental science club is for students passionate about the environment. They participate in city clean-ups and work to spread environmental awareness and promote Going-Green efforts around the city.

=== Sports ===
Weir High School is a member of the WVSSAC (West Virginia Secondary School Activity Commission). Due to the school's enrollment, it is known as a AAA athletic school. Weir High School has 20 varsity athletic teams in 13 different sports. Additionally, there are three freshmen-only teams in volleyball and men's basketball. The chart below shows Weir High School's athletic offerings by gender.

Male sports

- Baseball
- Basketball
- Bowling
- Cross Country
- Football
- Golf
- Soccer
- Swimming
- Tennis
- Track
- Wrestling

Female sports

- Basketball
- Bowling
- Cheer
- Cross Country
- Soccer
- Softball
- Swimming
- Tennis
- Track
- Volleyball

== Alumni ==
Notable almuni include:

- Jerry Bird – skydiver
- Bob Gain – an American football player, Cleveland Browns ('52–'64); 1950 Outland Trophy winner (U. Kentucky)
- Jerry A. Hausman – an economist and tenured professor at MIT and developer of the Hausman specification test
- Bob Jeter – NFL player for Green Bay Packers and Chicago Bears
- Kevin Miller – former National Football League wide receiver
- Ron Williams – NBA basketball player, West Virginia University
- Quincy Wilson – an American football player who played for: West Virginia University, and the Cincinnati Bengals (2004–2007)
