= L. J. Forman =

American politician

President of the Senate of West Virginia
- In office 1909–1911
- Preceded by: Joseph H. McDermott
- Succeeded by: Robert F. Kidd

Member of the West Virginia Senate from the 14th district

Personal details
- Born: Lewis Johnson Forman; January 7, 1855 Preston County, Virginia, U.S.
- Died: January 3, 1933 (aged 77) Petersburg, West Virginia, U.S.
- Party: Republican
- Spouse: Virginia Baker (m. 1886)
- Education: National Normal University
- Profession: attorney

Lewis Johnson Forman (January 7, 1855 – January 3, 1933) was the Republican President of the West Virginia Senate from Grant County and served from 1909 to 1911. He had previously served as the prosecuting attorney of Grant County, a position he held for 16 years. He died in 1933 of heart disease.

Political offices
Preceded by Joseph H. McDermott	President of the WV Senate; 1909–1911	Succeeded by Robert F. Kidd
