= Larry Tucker (politician) =

American politician (1935–2016)

President of the West Virginia Senate
- In office January 11, 1989 – September 7, 1989
- Preceded by: Dan R. Tonkovich
- Succeeded by: Keith Burdette

Member of the West Virginia Senate from the 12th district
- In office December 1, 1982 – September 7, 1989
- Succeeded by: Walt Helmick

Personal details
- Born: November 11, 1935 Carbondale, West Virginia, U.S.
- Died: November 16, 2016 (aged 81) Summersville, West Virginia, U.S.
- Party: Democratic
- Spouse(s): Jean Copeland m. 19 May 1978
- Children: 7
- Education: West Virginia Institute of Technology

Larry Alan Tucker (November 11, 1935 – November 16, 2016) was an American politician.

Born in Carbondale, West Virginia, Tucker went to Montgomery High School. He then graduated from West Virginia University Institute of Technology. He served in the United States Army. Tucker served as the Democratic member of the West Virginia Senate from Nicholas County (12th District) from 1983 to 1989.

He resigned from office after pleading guilty in United States District Court to extortion.

In 2008, Tucker unsuccessfully challenged incumbent Tom Blankenship for the Democratic nomination for a seat on the Nicholas County Commission.

He died in Summersville, West Virginia on November 16, 2016.

Political offices
Preceded by Dan R. Tonkovich	President of the West Virginia Senate; 1989	Succeeded by Keith Burdette
