= Arnold M. Vickers =

American politician

Arnold M. Vickers (August 8, 1908 – December 25, 1967) was the Democratic President of the West Virginia Senate from Fayette County and served from 1945 to 1949.

Political offices
| Preceded by James Paull | President of the WV Senate; 1945–1949 | Succeeded by W. Broughton Johnston |
