= Byron B. Randolph =

American Democratic politician

Byron B. Randolph was the Democratic President of the West Virginia Senate from Harrison County and served from 1941 to 1943.

Political offices
Preceded by William M. LaFon	President of the WV Senate; 1941–1943	Succeeded by James Paull
