= Lloyd G. Jackson =

American politician

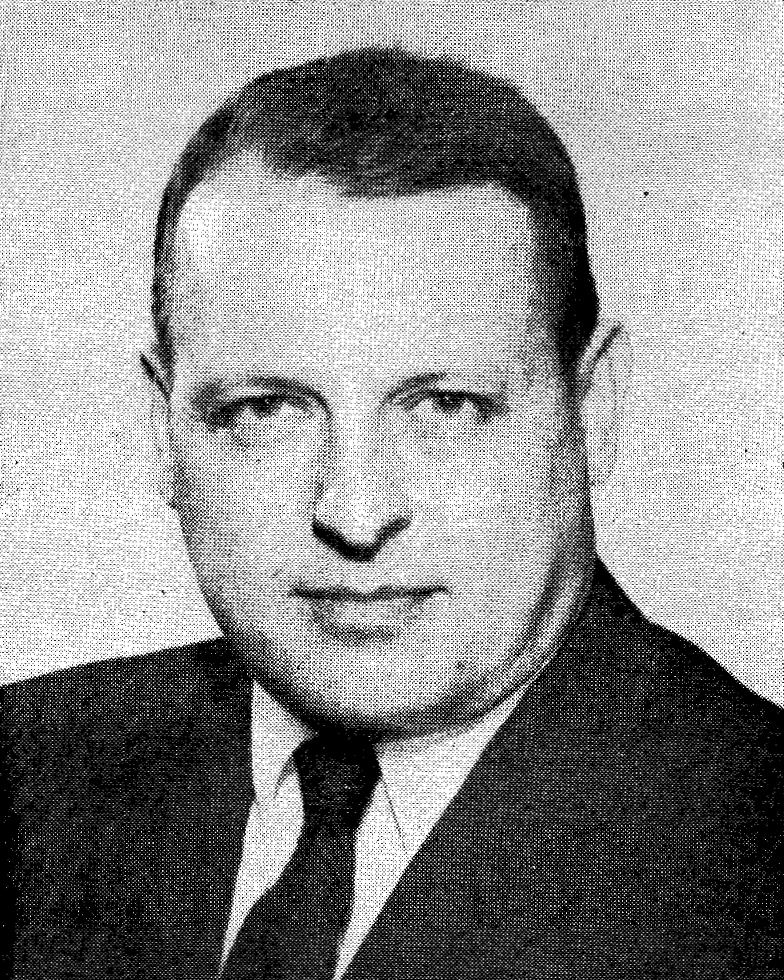

41st President of the West Virginia Senate
- In office 1969–1971
- Preceded by: Howard W. Carson
- Succeeded by: E. Hansford McCourt

Member of the West Virginia Senate from the 7th district
- In office December 1, 1946 – December 1, 1970
- Preceded by: Alney M. Hall
- Succeeded by: David E. Wallace

Personal details
- Born: Lloyd George Jackson; May 30, 1918 Yawkey, West Virginia, U.S.
- Died: October 29, 2011 (aged 93) Hamlin, West Virginia, U.S.
- Party: Democratic
- Spouse: Pauline Adkins (m. 1948)
- Children: 2, including Lloyd II

Military service
- Branch/service: United States Army
- Years of service: 1941–1945
- Rank: Master sergeant
- Battles/wars: World War II

Lloyd George Jackson (May 30, 1918 – October 29, 2011) was the Democratic President of the West Virginia Senate from Lincoln County and served from 1969 to 1971. He was first elected in 1946 and stayed in office until his primary defeat in 1970. Until his death he lived in Hamlin, West Virginia. He was married to Pauline Adkins and they had two children, Lloyd G. Jackson II and Suzanne Jackson. They also had two grandchildren, LG Jackson III (Lloyd) and Ryan Jackson.

Political offices
Preceded by Howard W. Carson	President of the WV Senate; 1969–1971	Succeeded by E. Hansford McCourt
