= West Virginia's congressional delegations =

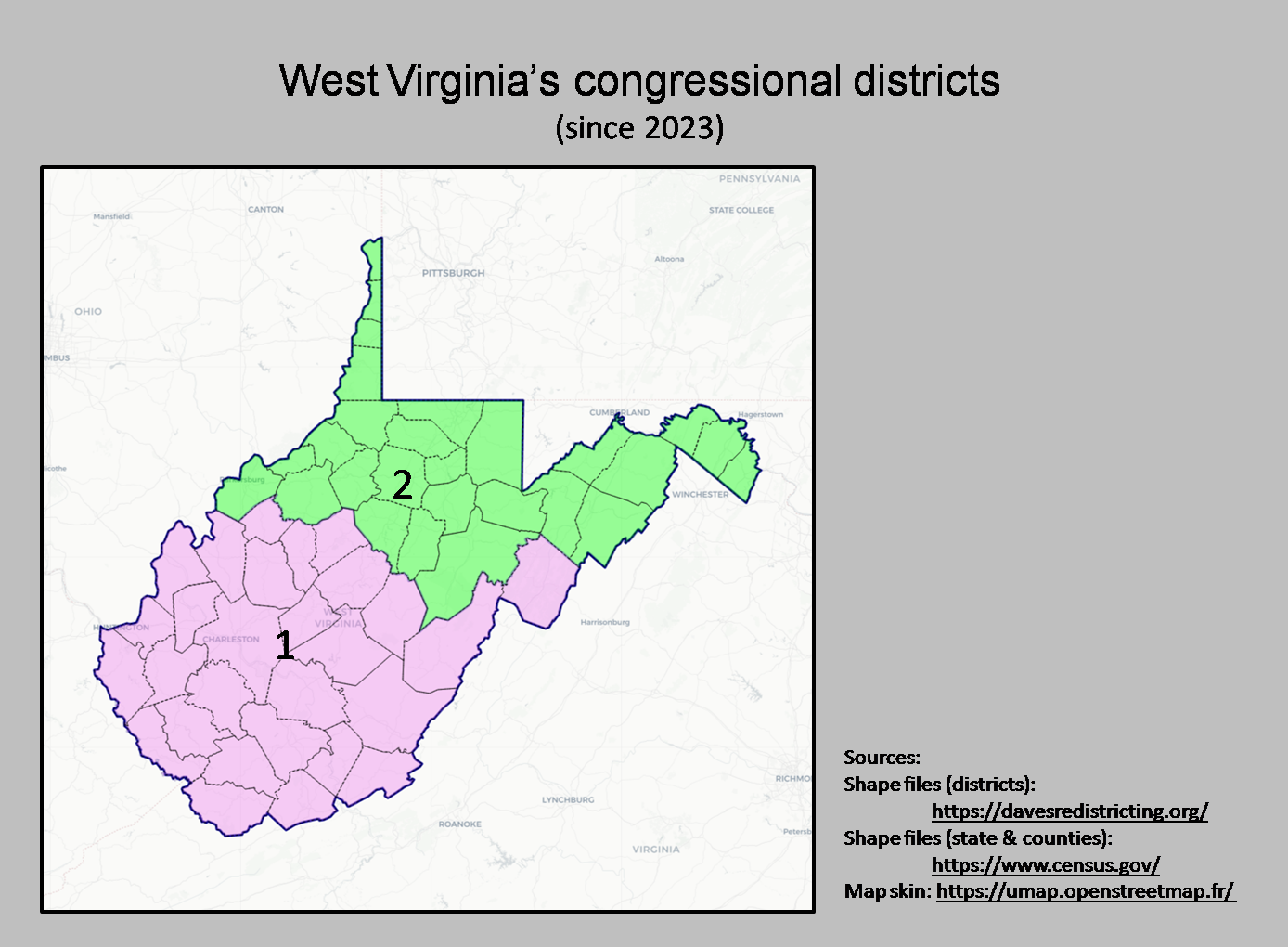
West Virginia's congressional districts since 2023

These are tables of congressional delegations from West Virginia to the United States House of Representatives and the United States Senate.

From June 1861 to June 1863, during the Civil War and before West Virginia statehood, the United States recognized the Restored (or Reorganized) Government of Virginia sitting in Wheeling as the "legitimate", pro-Union government of Virginia. It controlled a contiguous area roughly the same as present-day West Virginia, along with portions of Northern Virginia and the Tidewater Region. The rest of Virginia was under Confederate military control, with a state government in Richmond and did not send representatives to Congress. The legislature in Wheeling chose two U.S. Senators for Virginia, John S. Carlile and Waitman T. Willey, who were seated by the Senate. Three U.S. Representatives elected in western districts of Virginia also went to Congress in 1861: Jacob B. Blair, William G. Brown, and Kellian V. Whaley. In 1861, as one of its first acts, the Restored Government began the process of creating the new state of West Virginia, which was achieved in 1863. The Restored Government of Virginia then moved to Alexandria.

== Current delegation ==
West Virginia's current congressional delegation to the 119th Congress consists of two senators and two representatives, all of whom are Republicans. The state of West Virginia was reduced to two congressional seats beginning in 2023, following the 2020 redistricting cycle. The current dean of the West Virginia delegation is Senator Shelley Moore Capito, who has served in the Senate since 2015, and previously served in the House of Representatives from 2001 to 2015.

The Cook Partisan Voting Index (CPVI) is a measure of how strongly partisan a state is. It measures the party leaning (Democratic or Republican) and the number of percentage points more partisan than the national average. For instance, R+4 would mean the state voted four percentage points more Republican than the national average. As of 2025, the CPVI ranked both of West Virginia's districts as solidly Republican. As a state, West Virginia is ranked as solidly Republican, with a score of R+21.

Current U.S. senators from West Virginia
West Virginia CPVI (2025): R+21	Class I senator	Class II senator
West Virginia CPVI (2025): R+21	Jim Justice (Junior senator) (Lewisburg)	Shelley Moore Capito (Senior senator) (Charleston)
Party	Republican	Republican
Incumbent since	January 14, 2025	January 3, 2015

District	CPVI	Representative (Residence)	Party	Incumbent time in office	District map
1st	R+22	Carol Miller (Huntington)	Republican	Since January 3, 2019	
2nd	R+20	Riley Moore (Harpers Ferry)	Republican	Since January 3, 2025	

== U.S. House of Representatives ==
Democratic (D) Republican (R) Union (U)

Congress	1st district	2nd district	3rd district	4th district	5th district	At-large
38th (1863–1865)	Jacob B. Blair (U)	William G. Brown Sr. (U)	Kellian Whaley (U)			
39th (1865–1867)	Chester D. Hubbard (R)	George R. Latham (U)	Kellian Whaley (U)			
40th (1867–1869)	Chester D. Hubbard (R)	Bethuel Kitchen (R)	Daniel Polsley (R)			
41st (1869–1871)	Isaac H. Duval (R)	James McGrew (R)	John Witcher (R)			
42nd (1871–1873)	John James; Davis (D)	James McGrew (R)	Frank Hereford (D)			
43rd (1873–1875)	John James; Davis (D)	John Hagans (R)	Frank Hereford (D)			
44th (1875–1877)	Benjamin Wilson (D)	Charles J. Faulkner (D)	Frank Hereford (D)			
45th (1877–1879)	Benjamin Wilson (D)	Benjamin F. Martin (D)	John E. Kenna (D)			
46th (1879–1881)	Benjamin Wilson (D)	Benjamin F. Martin (D)	John E. Kenna (D)			
47th (1881–1883)	Benjamin Wilson (D)	John B. Hoge (D)	John E. Kenna (D)			
48th (1883–1885)	Nathan Goff Jr. (R)	William Lyne; Wilson (D)	Charles P. Snyder (D)	Eustace Gibson (D)		
49th (1885–1887)	Nathan Goff Jr. (R)	William Lyne; Wilson (D)	Charles P. Snyder (D)	Eustace Gibson (D)		
50th (1887–1889)	Nathan Goff Jr. (R)	William Lyne; Wilson (D)	Charles P. Snyder (D)	Charles E. Hogg (D)		
51st (1889–1891)	John O. Pendleton (D)	William Lyne; Wilson (D)	John D. Alderson (D)	James M. Jackson (D)		
51st (1889–1891)	George W. Atkinson (R)	William Lyne; Wilson (D)	John D. Alderson (D)	Charles Brooks Smith (R)		
52nd (1891–1893)	John O. Pendleton (D)	William Lyne; Wilson (D)	John D. Alderson (D)	James Capehart (D)		
53rd (1893–1895)	John O. Pendleton (D)	William Lyne; Wilson (D)	John D. Alderson (D)	James Capehart (D)		
54th (1895–1897)	Blackburn B. Dovener (R)	Alston G. Dayton (R)	James H. Huling (R)	Warren Miller (R)		
55th (1897–1899)	Blackburn B. Dovener (R)	Alston G. Dayton (R)	Charles Dorr (R)	Warren Miller (R)		
56th (1899–1901)	Blackburn B. Dovener (R)	Alston G. Dayton (R)	David Emmons; Johnston (D)	Romeo H. Freer (R)		
57th (1901–1903)	Blackburn B. Dovener (R)	Alston G. Dayton (R)	Joseph H. Gaines (R)	James A. Hughes (R)		
58th (1903–1905)	Blackburn B. Dovener (R)	Alston G. Dayton (R)	Joseph H. Gaines (R)	Harry C. Woodyard (R)	James A. Hughes (R)	
59th (1905–1907)	Blackburn B. Dovener (R)	Alston G. Dayton (R)	Joseph H. Gaines (R)	Harry C. Woodyard (R)	James A. Hughes (R)	
59th (1905–1907)	Blackburn B. Dovener (R)	Thomas B. Davis (D)	Joseph H. Gaines (R)	Harry C. Woodyard (R)	James A. Hughes (R)	
60th (1907–1909)	William Pallister; Hubbard (R)	George C. Sturgiss (R)	Joseph H. Gaines (R)	Harry C. Woodyard (R)	James A. Hughes (R)	
61st (1909–1911)	William Pallister; Hubbard (R)	George C. Sturgiss (R)	Joseph H. Gaines (R)	Harry C. Woodyard (R)	James A. Hughes (R)	
62nd (1911–1913)	John W. Davis (D)	William G. Brown Jr. (D)	Adam B. Littlepage (D)	John M. Hamilton (D)	James A. Hughes (R)	
63rd (1913–1915)	John W. Davis (D)	William G. Brown Jr. (D)	Samuel B. Avis (R)	Hunter H. Moss Jr. (R)	James A. Hughes (R)	Howard Sutherland (R)
63rd (1913–1915)	Matthew M. Neely (D)	William G. Brown Jr. (D)	Samuel B. Avis (R)	Hunter H. Moss Jr. (R)	James A. Hughes (R)	Howard Sutherland (R)
64th (1915–1917)	Matthew M. Neely (D)	William G. Brown Jr. (D)	Adam B. Littlepage (D)	Hunter H. Moss Jr. (R)	Edward Cooper (R)	Howard Sutherland (R)
64th (1915–1917)	Matthew M. Neely (D)	George Meade; Bowers (R)	Adam B. Littlepage (D)	Harry C. Woodyard (R)	Edward Cooper (R)	Howard Sutherland (R)
64th (1915–1917)	Matthew M. Neely (D)	George Meade; Bowers (R)	Adam B. Littlepage (D)	Harry C. Woodyard (R)	Edward Cooper (R)	6th district
65th (1917–1919)	Matthew M. Neely (D)	George Meade; Bowers (R)	Stuart F. Reed (R)	Harry C. Woodyard (R)	Edward Cooper (R)	Adam B. Littlepage (D)
66th (1919–1921)	Matthew M. Neely (D)	George Meade; Bowers (R)	Stuart F. Reed (R)	Harry C. Woodyard (R)	Wells Goodykoontz (R)	Leonard S. Echols (R)
67th (1921–1923)	Benjamin L. Rosenbloom (R)	George Meade; Bowers (R)	Stuart F. Reed (R)	Harry C. Woodyard (R)	Wells Goodykoontz (R)	Leonard S. Echols (R)
68th (1923–1925)	Benjamin L. Rosenbloom (R)	Robert E. Lee Allen (D)	Stuart F. Reed (R)	George W. Johnson (D)	Thomas Jefferson; Lilly (D)	J. Alfred Taylor (D)
69th (1925–1927)	Carl G. Bachmann (R)	Frank Llewellyn; Bowman (R)	John M. Wolverton (R)	Harry C. Woodyard (R)	James F. Strother (R)	J. Alfred Taylor (D)
70th (1927–1929)	Carl G. Bachmann (R)	Frank Llewellyn; Bowman (R)	William S. O'Brien (D)	James A. Hughes (R)	James F. Strother (R)	Edward T. England (R)
71st (1929–1931)	Carl G. Bachmann (R)	Frank Llewellyn; Bowman (R)	John M. Wolverton (R)	James A. Hughes (R)	Hugh Ike Shott (R)	Joe L. Smith (D)
71st (1929–1931)	Carl G. Bachmann (R)	Frank Llewellyn; Bowman (R)	John M. Wolverton (R)	Robert L. Hogg (R)	Hugh Ike Shott (R)	Joe L. Smith (D)
72nd (1931–1933)	Carl G. Bachmann (R)	Frank Llewellyn; Bowman (R)	Lynn Hornor (D)	Robert L. Hogg (R)	Hugh Ike Shott (R)	Joe L. Smith (D)
73rd (1933–1935)	Robert L. Ramsay (D)	Jennings Randolph (D)	Lynn Hornor (D)	George W. Johnson (D)	John Kee (D)	Joe L. Smith (D)
73rd (1933–1935)	Robert L. Ramsay (D)	Jennings Randolph (D)	Andrew; Edminston Jr. (D)	George W. Johnson (D)	John Kee (D)	Joe L. Smith (D)
74th (1935–1937)	Robert L. Ramsay (D)	Jennings Randolph (D)	Andrew; Edminston Jr. (D)	George W. Johnson (D)	John Kee (D)	Joe L. Smith (D)
75th (1937–1939)	Robert L. Ramsay (D)	Jennings Randolph (D)	Andrew; Edminston Jr. (D)	George W. Johnson (D)	John Kee (D)	Joe L. Smith (D)
76th (1939–1941)	A. C. Schiffler (R)	Jennings Randolph (D)	Andrew; Edminston Jr. (D)	George W. Johnson (D)	John Kee (D)	Joe L. Smith (D)
77th (1941–1943)	Robert L. Ramsay (D)	Jennings Randolph (D)	Andrew; Edminston Jr. (D)	George W. Johnson (D)	John Kee (D)	Joe L. Smith (D)
78th (1943–1945)	A. C. Schiffler (R)	Jennings Randolph (D)	Edward G. Rohrbough (R)	Hubert S. Ellis (R)	John Kee (D)	Joe L. Smith (D)
79th (1945–1947)	Matthew M. Neely (D)	Jennings Randolph (D)	Cleveland M. Bailey (D)	Hubert S. Ellis (R)	John Kee (D)	E. H. Hedrick (D)
80th (1947–1949)	Francis J. Love (R)	Melvin C. Snyder (R)	Edward G. Rohrbough (R)	Hubert S. Ellis (R)	John Kee (D)	E. H. Hedrick (D)
81st (1949–1951)	Robert L. Ramsay (D)	Harley Orrin; Staggers (D)	Cleveland M. Bailey (D)	Maurice G. Burnside (D)	John Kee (D)	E. H. Hedrick (D)
82nd (1951–1953)	Robert L. Ramsay (D)	Harley Orrin; Staggers (D)	Cleveland M. Bailey (D)	Maurice G. Burnside (D)	John Kee (D)	E. H. Hedrick (D)
82nd (1951–1953)	Robert L. Ramsay (D)	Harley Orrin; Staggers (D)	Cleveland M. Bailey (D)	Maurice G. Burnside (D)	Elizabeth Kee (D)	E. H. Hedrick (D)
83rd (1953–1955)	Bob Mollohan (D)	Harley Orrin; Staggers (D)	Cleveland M. Bailey (D)	Will E. Neal (R)	Elizabeth Kee (D)	Robert Byrd (D)
84th (1955–1957)	Bob Mollohan (D)	Harley Orrin; Staggers (D)	Cleveland M. Bailey (D)	Maurice G. Burnside (D)	Elizabeth Kee (D)	Robert Byrd (D)
85th (1957–1959)	Arch A. Moore Jr. (R)	Harley Orrin; Staggers (D)	Cleveland M. Bailey (D)	Will E. Neal (R)	Elizabeth Kee (D)	Robert Byrd (D)
86th (1959–1961)	Arch A. Moore Jr. (R)	Harley Orrin; Staggers (D)	Cleveland M. Bailey (D)	Ken Hechler (D)	Elizabeth Kee (D)	John M. Slack Jr. (D)
87th (1961–1963)	Arch A. Moore Jr. (R)	Harley Orrin; Staggers (D)	Cleveland M. Bailey (D)	Ken Hechler (D)	Elizabeth Kee (D)	John M. Slack Jr. (D)
88th (1963–1965)	Arch A. Moore Jr. (R)	Harley Orrin; Staggers (D)	John M. Slack Jr. (D)	Ken Hechler (D)	Elizabeth Kee (D)	
89th (1965–1967)	Arch A. Moore Jr. (R)	Harley Orrin; Staggers (D)	John M. Slack Jr. (D)	Ken Hechler (D)	James Kee (D)	
90th (1967–1969)	Arch A. Moore Jr. (R)	Harley Orrin; Staggers (D)	John M. Slack Jr. (D)	Ken Hechler (D)	James Kee (D)	
91st (1969–1971)	Bob Mollohan (D)	Harley Orrin; Staggers (D)	John M. Slack Jr. (D)	Ken Hechler (D)	James Kee (D)	
92nd (1971–1973)	Bob Mollohan (D)	Harley Orrin; Staggers (D)	John M. Slack Jr. (D)	Ken Hechler (D)	James Kee (D)	
93rd (1973–1975)	Bob Mollohan (D)	Harley Orrin; Staggers (D)	John M. Slack Jr. (D)	Ken Hechler (D)		
94th (1975–1977)	Bob Mollohan (D)	Harley Orrin; Staggers (D)	John M. Slack Jr. (D)	Ken Hechler (D)		
95th (1977–1979)	Bob Mollohan (D)	Harley Orrin; Staggers (D)	John M. Slack Jr. (D)	Nick Rahall (D)		
96th (1979–1981)	Bob Mollohan (D)	Harley Orrin; Staggers (D)	John M. Slack Jr. (D)	Nick Rahall (D)		
96th (1979–1981)	Bob Mollohan (D)	Harley Orrin; Staggers (D)	John G. Hutchinson (D)	Nick Rahall (D)		
97th (1981–1983)	Bob Mollohan (D)	Cleve Benedict (R)	Mick Staton (R)	Nick Rahall (D)		
98th (1983–1985)	Alan Mollohan (D)	Harley O. Staggers Jr. (D)	Bob Wise (D)	Nick Rahall (D)		
99th (1985–1987)	Alan Mollohan (D)	Harley O. Staggers Jr. (D)	Bob Wise (D)	Nick Rahall (D)		
100th (1987–1989)	Alan Mollohan (D)	Harley O. Staggers Jr. (D)	Bob Wise (D)	Nick Rahall (D)		
101st (1989–1991)	Alan Mollohan (D)	Harley O. Staggers Jr. (D)	Bob Wise (D)	Nick Rahall (D)		
102nd (1991–1993)	Alan Mollohan (D)	Harley O. Staggers Jr. (D)	Bob Wise (D)	Nick Rahall (D)		
103rd (1993–1995)	Alan Mollohan (D)	Bob Wise (D)	Nick Rahall (D)			
104th (1995–1997)	Alan Mollohan (D)	Bob Wise (D)	Nick Rahall (D)			
105th (1997–1999)	Alan Mollohan (D)	Bob Wise (D)	Nick Rahall (D)			
106th (1999–2001)	Alan Mollohan (D)	Bob Wise (D)	Nick Rahall (D)			
107th (2001–2003)	Alan Mollohan (D)	Shelley Moore; Capito (R)	Nick Rahall (D)			
108th (2003–2005)	Alan Mollohan (D)	Shelley Moore; Capito (R)	Nick Rahall (D)			
109th (2005–2007)	Alan Mollohan (D)	Shelley Moore; Capito (R)	Nick Rahall (D)			
110th (2007–2009)	Alan Mollohan (D)	Shelley Moore; Capito (R)	Nick Rahall (D)			
111th (2009–2011)	Alan Mollohan (D)	Shelley Moore; Capito (R)	Nick Rahall (D)			
112th (2011–2013)	David McKinley (R)	Shelley Moore; Capito (R)	Nick Rahall (D)			
113th (2013–2015)	David McKinley (R)	Shelley Moore; Capito (R)	Nick Rahall (D)			
114th (2015–2017)	David McKinley (R)	Alex Mooney (R)	Evan Jenkins (R)			
115th (2017–2019)	David McKinley (R)	Alex Mooney (R)	Evan Jenkins (R)			
116th (2019–2021)	David McKinley (R)	Alex Mooney (R)	Carol Miller (R)			
117th (2021–2023)	David McKinley (R)	Alex Mooney (R)	Carol Miller (R)			
118th (2023–2025)	Carol Miller (R)	Alex Mooney (R)				
119th (2025–2027)	Carol Miller (R)	Riley Moore (R)				
120th (2027–2029)	Carol Miller (R)	Riley Moore (R)				

== United States Senate ==
Democratic (D) Republican (R) Union (U) Independent (I)

Class I senator	Congress	Class II senator
Peter G. Van Winkle (U)	38th (1863–1865)	Waitman T. Willey (U)
Peter G. Van Winkle (U)	39th (1865–1867)	Waitman T. Willey (R)
Peter G. Van Winkle (R)	40th (1867–1869)	Waitman T. Willey (R)
Arthur I. Boreman (R)	41st (1869–1871)	Waitman T. Willey (R)
Arthur I. Boreman (R)	42nd (1871–1873)	Henry G. Davis (D)
Arthur I. Boreman (R)	43rd (1873–1875)	Henry G. Davis (D)
Allen T. Caperton (D)	44th (1875–1877)	Henry G. Davis (D)
Samuel Price (D)	44th (1875–1877)	Henry G. Davis (D)
Frank Hereford (D)	44th (1875–1877)	Henry G. Davis (D)
Frank Hereford (D)	45th (1877–1879)	Henry G. Davis (D)
Frank Hereford (D)	46th (1879–1881)	Henry G. Davis (D)
Johnson N. Camden (D)	47th (1881–1883)	Henry G. Davis (D)
Johnson N. Camden (D)	48th (1883–1885)	John E. Kenna (D)
Johnson N. Camden (D)	49th (1885–1887)	John E. Kenna (D)
Charles James Faulkner (D)	50th (1887–1889)	John E. Kenna (D)
Charles James Faulkner (D)	51st (1889–1891)	John E. Kenna (D)
Charles James Faulkner (D)	52nd (1891–1893)	John E. Kenna (D)
Charles James Faulkner (D)	52nd (1891–1893)	Johnson N. Camden (D)
Charles James Faulkner (D)	53rd (1893–1895)	Johnson N. Camden (D)
Charles James Faulkner (D)	54th (1895–1897)	Stephen B. Elkins (R)
Charles James Faulkner (D)	55th (1897–1899)	Stephen B. Elkins (R)
Nathan B. Scott (R)	56th (1899–1901)	Stephen B. Elkins (R)
Nathan B. Scott (R)	57th (1901–1903)	Stephen B. Elkins (R)
Nathan B. Scott (R)	58th (1903–1905)	Stephen B. Elkins (R)
Nathan B. Scott (R)	59th (1905–1907)	Stephen B. Elkins (R)
Nathan B. Scott (R)	60th (1907–1909)	Stephen B. Elkins (R)
Nathan B. Scott (R)	61st (1909–1911)	Stephen B. Elkins (R)
Nathan B. Scott (R)	61st (1909–1911)	Davis Elkins (R)
Nathan B. Scott (R)	61st (1909–1911)	Clarence W. Watson (D)
William E. Chilton (D)	62nd (1911–1913)	Clarence W. Watson (D)
William E. Chilton (D)	63rd (1913–1915)	Nathan Goff Jr. (R)
William E. Chilton (D)	64th (1915–1917)	Nathan Goff Jr. (R)
Howard Sutherland (R)	65th (1917–1919)	Nathan Goff Jr. (R)
Howard Sutherland (R)	66th (1919–1921)	Davis Elkins (R)
Howard Sutherland (R)	67th (1921–1923)	Davis Elkins (R)
Matthew M. Neely (D)	68th (1923–1925)	Davis Elkins (R)
Matthew M. Neely (D)	69th (1925–1927)	Guy D. Goff (R)
Matthew M. Neely (D)	70th (1927–1929)	Guy D. Goff (R)
Henry D. Hatfield (R)	71st (1929–1931)	Guy D. Goff (R)
Henry D. Hatfield (R)	72nd (1931–1933)	Matthew M. Neely (D)
Henry D. Hatfield (R)	73rd (1933–1935)	Matthew M. Neely (D)
Rush Holt Sr. (D)	74th (1935–1937)	Matthew M. Neely (D)
Rush Holt Sr. (D)	75th (1937–1939)	Matthew M. Neely (D)
Rush Holt Sr. (D)	76th (1939–1941)	Matthew M. Neely (D)
Harley M. Kilgore (D)	77th (1941–1943)	Matthew M. Neely (D)
Harley M. Kilgore (D)	77th (1941–1943)	Joseph Rosier (D)
Harley M. Kilgore (D)	77th (1941–1943)	Hugh Ike Shott (R)
Harley M. Kilgore (D)	78th (1943–1945)	Chapman Revercomb (R)
Harley M. Kilgore (D)	79th (1945–1947)	Chapman Revercomb (R)
Harley M. Kilgore (D)	80th (1947–1949)	Chapman Revercomb (R)
Harley M. Kilgore (D)	81st (1949–1951)	Matthew M. Neely (D)
Harley M. Kilgore (D)	82nd (1951–1953)	Matthew M. Neely (D)
Harley M. Kilgore (D)	83rd (1953–1955)	Matthew M. Neely (D)
Harley M. Kilgore (D)	84th (1955–1957)	Matthew M. Neely (D)
William Laird III (D)	84th (1955–1957)	Matthew M. Neely (D)
Chapman Revercomb (R)	84th (1955–1957)	Matthew M. Neely (D)
Chapman Revercomb (R)	85th (1957–1959)	Matthew M. Neely (D)
Chapman Revercomb (R)	85th (1957–1959)	John D. Hoblitzell Jr. (R)
Chapman Revercomb (R)	85th (1957–1959)	Jennings Randolph (D)
Robert Byrd (D)	86th (1959–1961)	Jennings Randolph (D)
Robert Byrd (D)	87th (1961–1963)	Jennings Randolph (D)
Robert Byrd (D)	88th (1963–1965)	Jennings Randolph (D)
Robert Byrd (D)	89th (1965–1967)	Jennings Randolph (D)
Robert Byrd (D)	90th (1967–1969)	Jennings Randolph (D)
Robert Byrd (D)	91st (1969–1971)	Jennings Randolph (D)
Robert Byrd (D)	92nd (1971–1973)	Jennings Randolph (D)
Robert Byrd (D)	93rd (1973–1975)	Jennings Randolph (D)
Robert Byrd (D)	94th (1975–1977)	Jennings Randolph (D)
Robert Byrd (D)	95th (1977–1979)	Jennings Randolph (D)
Robert Byrd (D)	96th (1979–1981)	Jennings Randolph (D)
Robert Byrd (D)	97th (1981–1983)	Jennings Randolph (D)
Robert Byrd (D)	98th (1983–1985)	Jennings Randolph (D)
Robert Byrd (D)	99th (1985–1987)	Jay Rockefeller (D)
Robert Byrd (D)	100th (1987–1989)	Jay Rockefeller (D)
Robert Byrd (D)	101st (1989–1991)	Jay Rockefeller (D)
Robert Byrd (D)	102nd (1991–1993)	Jay Rockefeller (D)
Robert Byrd (D)	103rd (1993–1995)	Jay Rockefeller (D)
Robert Byrd (D)	104th (1995–1997)	Jay Rockefeller (D)
Robert Byrd (D)	105th (1997–1999)	Jay Rockefeller (D)
Robert Byrd (D)	106th (1999–2001)	Jay Rockefeller (D)
Robert Byrd (D)	107th (2001–2003)	Jay Rockefeller (D)
Robert Byrd (D)	108th (2003–2005)	Jay Rockefeller (D)
Robert Byrd (D)	109th (2005–2007)	Jay Rockefeller (D)
Robert Byrd (D)	110th (2007–2009)	Jay Rockefeller (D)
Robert Byrd (D)	111th (2009-2011)	Jay Rockefeller (D)
Carte Goodwin (D)	111th (2009-2011)	Jay Rockefeller (D)
Joe Manchin (D)	111th (2009-2011)	Jay Rockefeller (D)
Joe Manchin (D)	112th (2011–2013)	Jay Rockefeller (D)
Joe Manchin (D)	113th (2013–2015)	Jay Rockefeller (D)
Joe Manchin (D)	114th (2015–2017)	Shelley Moore Capito (R)
Joe Manchin (D)	115th (2017–2019)	Shelley Moore Capito (R)
Joe Manchin (D)	116th (2019–2021)	Shelley Moore Capito (R)
Joe Manchin (D)	117th (2021–2023)	Shelley Moore Capito (R)
Joe Manchin (D)	118th (2023–2025)	Shelley Moore Capito (R)
Joe Manchin (I)	118th (2023–2025)	Shelley Moore Capito (R)
Jim Justice (R)	119th (2025–2027)	Shelley Moore Capito (R)
Jim Justice (R)	120th (2027–2029)	Shelley Moore Capito (R)
Class I senator	Congress	Class II senator

== See also ==
- List of United States congressional districts
- West Virginia's congressional districts
- Political party strength in West Virginia
