= List of United States representatives from West Virginia =

The following is an alphabetical list of United States representatives from the state of West Virginia. For chronological tables of members of both houses of the United States Congress from the state (through the present day), see West Virginia's congressional delegations. The list of names should be complete (as of January 3, 2025).

== Current members ==
Updated January 3, 2025.

- 1st district: Carol Miller (R) (since 2019)
- 2nd district: Riley Moore (R) (since 2025)

== List of members ==
| Member | Party | Years | District | Home town | Home county | Notes | Ref. |
|---|---|---|---|---|---|---|---|
| John D. Alderson | Democratic | March 4, 1889 – March 3, 1895 | 3rd | Summersville | Nicholas | Elected in 1888. Lost re-election to Huling. | |
| Robert E. Lee Allen | Democratic | March 4, 1923 – March 3, 1925 | 2nd | Morgantown | Monongalia | Elected in 1922. Lost re-election to Bowman. | |
| George W. Atkinson | Republican | February 26, 1890 – March 3, 1891 | 1st | Wheeling | Ohio | Won contested election. Retired. | |
| Samuel B. Avis | Republican | March 4, 1913 – March 3, 1915 | 3rd | Charleston | Kanawha | Elected in 1912. Lost re-election to Littlepage. | |
| Carl G. Bachmann | Republican | March 4, 1925 – March 3, 1933 | 1st | Wheeling | Ohio | Elected in 1924. Lost re-election to Ramsay. | |
| Cleveland M. Bailey | Democratic | January 3, 1945 – January 3, 1947 | 3rd | Clarksburg | Harrison | Elected in 1944. Lost re-election to Rohrbough. | |
| Cleveland M. Bailey | Democratic | January 3, 1949 – January 3, 1963 | 3rd | Clarksburg | Harrison | Elected in 1948. Redistricted to the 1st district and lost re-election to Moore. | |
| Cleve Benedict | Republican | January 3, 1981 – January 3, 1983 | 2nd | Lewisburg | Greenbrier | Elected in 1980. Retired to run for U.S. senator. | |
| Jacob B. Blair | Union | December 17, 1863 – March 3, 1865 | 1st | Parkersburg | Wood | Elected in 1863. Retired. | |
| George M. Bowers | Republican | May 9, 1916 – March 3, 1923 | 2nd | Gerrardstown | Berkeley | Elected to finish Brown's term. Lost re-election to Allen. | |
| Frank L. Bowman | Republican | March 4, 1925 – March 3, 1933 | 2nd | Morgantown | Monongalia | Elected in 1924. Lost re-election to Randolph. | |
| William Gay Brown, Sr. | Union | December 7, 1863 – March 3, 1865 | 2nd | Kingwood | Preston | Elected in 1863. Retired. | |
| William Gay Brown, Jr. | Democratic | March 4, 1911 – March 9, 1916 | 2nd | Kingwood | Preston | Elected in 1910. Died. | |
| M. G. Burnside | Democratic | January 3, 1949 – January 3, 1953 | 4th | Huntington | Cabell | Elected in 1948. Lost re-election to Neal. | |
| M. G. Burnside | Democratic | January 3, 1955 – January 3, 1957 | 4th | Huntington | Cabell | Elected in 1954. Lost re-election to Neal. | |
| Robert Byrd | Democratic | January 3, 1953 – January 3, 1959 | 6th | Stotesbury | Raleigh | Elected in 1952. Retired to run for U.S. senator. | |
| James Capehart | Democratic | March 4, 1891 – March 3, 1895 | 4th | Point Pleasant | Wood | Elected in 1890. Retired. | |
| Shelley Moore Capito | Republican | January 3, 2001 – January 3, 2015 | 2nd | Charleston | Kanawha | Elected in 2000. Retired to run for U.S. senator. | |
| Edward Cooper | Republican | March 4, 1915 – March 3, 1919 | 5th | Bramwell | Mercer | Elected in 1914. Lost renomination to Goodykoontz. | |
| John James Davis | Democratic | March 4, 1871 – March 3, 1875 | 1st | Clarksburg | Harrison | Elected in 1870. Retired. | |
| John W. Davis | Democratic | March 4, 1911 – August 29, 1913 | 1st | Clarksburg | Harrison | Elected in 1910. Resigned to become U.S. Solicitor General | |
| Thomas B. Davis | Democratic | June 6, 1905 – March 3, 1907 | 2nd | Keyser | Mineral | Elected to finish Dayton's term. Retired. | |
| Alston G. Dayton | Republican | March 4, 1895 – March 16, 1905 | 2nd | Philippi | Barbour | Elected in 1894. Resigned after being appointed as a judge of US District Court for the Northern District of West Virginia. | |
| Charles P. Dorr | Republican | March 4, 1897 – March 3, 1899 | 3rd | Webster Springs | Webster | Elected in 1896. Retired. | |
| Blackburn B. Dovener | Republican | March 4, 1895 – March 3, 1907 | 1st | Wheeling | Ohio | Elected in 1894. Lost renomination to W.P Hubbard. | |
| Isaac H. Duval | Republican | March 4, 1869 – March 3, 1871 | 1st | Wellsburg | Brooke | Elected in 1868. Retired. | |
| Leonard S. Echols | Republican | March 4, 1919 – March 3, 1923 | 6th | Charleston | Kanawha | Elected in 1918. Lost re-election to Taylor. | |
| Andrew Edmiston, Jr. | Democratic | November 28, 1933 – January 3, 1943 | 3rd | Weston | Lewis | Elected to finish Hornor's term. Lost re-election to Rohrbough. | |
| Hubert S. Ellis | Republican | January 3, 1943 – January 3, 1949 | 4th | Huntington | Cabell | Elected in 1942. Lost re-election to Burnside. | |
| Edward T. England | Republican | March 4, 1927 – March 3, 1929 | 6th | Logan | Logan | Elected in 1926. Lost re-election to J. Smith. | |
| Charles J. Faulkner, Sr. | Democratic | March 4, 1875 – March 3, 1877 | 2nd | Martinsburg | Berkeley | Elected in 1874. Retired to run for U.S. senator. | |
| Romeo H. Freer | Republican | March 4, 1899 – March 3, 1901 | 4th | Harrisville | Ritchie | Elected in 1898. Retired to run for Attorney General of West Virginia. | |
| Joseph H. Gaines | Republican | March 4, 1901 – March 3, 1911 | 3rd | Fayetteville | Fayette | Elected in 1900. Lost re-election to Littlepage. | |
| Eustace Gibson | Democratic | March 4, 1883 – March 3, 1887 | 4th | Huntington | Cabell | Elected in 1882. Lost renomination to Hogg. | |
| Nathan Goff | Republican | March 4, 1883 – March 3, 1889 | 1st | Clarksburg | Harrison | Elected in 1882. Retired. | |
| Wells Goodykoontz | Republican | March 4, 1919 – March 3, 1923 | 5th | Williamson | Mingo | Elected in 1918. Lost re-election to Lilly. | |
| John Hagans | Republican | March 4, 1873 – March 3, 1875 | 2nd | Morgantown | Monongalia | Elected in 1872. Lost re-election to Faulkner. | |
| John M. Hamilton | Democratic | March 4, 1911 – March 3, 1913 | 4th | Grantsville | Calhoun | Elected in 1910. Lost re-election to Moss. | |
| E. H. Hedrick | Democratic | January 3, 1945 – January 3, 1953 | 6th | Beckley | Raleigh | Elected in 1944. Retired to run for governor. | |
| Frank Hereford | Democratic | March 4, 1871 – January 31, 1877 | 3rd | Union | Monroe | Elected in 1870. Retired to run for U.S. Senator and resigned when elected. | |
| Ken Hechler | Democratic | January 3, 1959 – January 3, 1977 | 4th | Huntington | Cabell | Elected in 1958. Retired to run for governor. | |
| John B. Hoge | Democratic | March 4, 1881 – March 3, 1883 | 2nd | Martinsburg | Berkeley | Elected in 1880. Retired. | |
| Charles E. Hogg | Democratic | March 4, 1887 – March 3, 1889 | 4th | Point Pleasant | Mason | Elected in 1886. Lost renomination to Jackson. | |
| Robert Lynn Hogg | Republican | November 4, 1930 – March 3, 1933 | 4th | Point Pleasant | Mason | Elected to finish Hughes's term. Lost re-election to Johnson. | |
| Lynn Hornor | Democratic | March 4, 1931 – September 23, 1933 | 3rd | Clarksburg | Harrison | Elected in 1930. Died. | |
| Chester D. Hubbard | Union | March 4, 1865 – March 3, 1867 | 1st | Wheeling | Ohio | Elected in 1864. Lost renomination to Duval. | |
| Chester D. Hubbard | Republican | March 4, 1867 – March 3, 1869 | 1st | Wheeling | Ohio | Elected in 1864. Lost renomination to Duval. | |
| William P. Hubbard | Republican | March 4, 1907 – March 3, 1911 | 1st | Wheeling | Ohio | Elected in 1906. Retired. | |
| J. A. Hughes | Republican | March 4, 1901 – March 3, 1903 | 4th | Huntington | Cabell | Elected in 1900. Redistricted to the 5th district. | |
| J. A. Hughes | Republican | March 4, 1903 – March 3, 1915 | 5th | Huntington | Cabell | Redistricted from the 4th district and re-elected in 1902. Retired. | |
| J. A. Hughes | Republican | March 4, 1927 – March 2, 1930 | 4th | Huntington | Cabell | Elected in 1926. Died. | |
| James Hall Huling | Republican | March 4, 1895 – March 3, 1897 | 3rd | Charleston | Kanawha | Elected in 1894. Retired. | |
| John G. Hutchinson | Democratic | June 30, 1980 – January 3, 1981 | 3rd | Charleston | Kanawha | Elected to finish Slack's term. Lost re-election to Staton. | |
| James M. Jackson | Democratic | March 4, 1889 – February 3, 1890 | 4th | Parkersburg | Wood | Elected in 1888. Lost contested election. | |
| Evan Jenkins | Republican | January 3, 2015 – September 30, 2018 | 3rd | Charles Town | Jefferson | Elected in 2014. Resigned after being appointed justice of West Virginia Supreme Court of Appeals | |
| George William Johnson | Democratic | March 4, 1923 – March 3, 1925 | 4th | Charles Town | Jefferson | Elected in 1922. Lost re-election to Woodyard. | |
| George William Johnson | Democratic | March 4, 1933 – January 3, 1943 | 4th | Charles Town | Jefferson | Elected in 1932. Lost re-election to Ellis. | |
| David Emmons Johnston | Democratic | March 4, 1899 – March 3, 1901 | 3rd | Princeton | Mercer | Elected in 1898. Lost re-election to Gaines. | |
| Elizabeth Kee | Democratic | July 17, 1951 – January 3, 1965 | 5th | Bluefield | Mercer | Elected to finish her husband's term. Retired. | |
| James Kee | Democratic | January 3, 1965 – January 3, 1973 | 5th | Fayetteville | Fayette | Elected in 1964. Redistricted to the 4th district and lost renomination to Hechler. | |
| John Kee | Democratic | March 4, 1933 – May 8, 1951 | 5th | Bluefield | Mercer | Elected in 1932. Died. | |
| John E. Kenna | Democratic | March 4, 1877 – March 3, 1883 | 3rd | Charleston | Kanawha | Elected in 1876. Re-elected but resigned when elected U.S. senator. | |
| Bethuel M. Kitchen | Republican | March 4, 1867 – March 3, 1869 | 2nd | Ganotown | Berkeley | Elected in 1866. Retired. | |
| George Robert Latham | Union | March 4, 1865 – March 3, 1867 | 2nd | Buckhannon | Upshur | Elected in 1864. Retired. | |
| Thomas Jefferson Lilly | Democratic | March 4, 1923 – March 3, 1925 | 5th | Hinton | Summers | Elected in 1922. Lost re-election to Strother. | |
| Adam B. Littlepage | Democratic | March 4, 1911 – March 3, 1913 | 3rd | Charleston | Kanawha | Elected in 1910. Lost re-election to Avis. | |
| Adam B. Littlepage | Democratic | March 4, 1915 – March 3, 1917 | 3rd | Charleston | Kanawha | Elected in 1914. Redistricted to the 6th district. | |
| Adam B. Littlepage | Democratic | March 4, 1917 – March 3, 1919 | 6th | Charleston | Kanawha | Redistricted from the 3rd district and re-elected in 1916. Lost re-election to Echols. | |
| Francis J. Love | Republican | January 3, 1947 – January 3, 1949 | 1st | Wheeling | Ohio | Elected in 1946. Lost re-election to Ramsay. | |
| Benjamin Franklin Martin | Democratic | March 4, 1877 – March 3, 1881 | 2nd | Pruntytown | Taylor | Elected in 1876. Lost renomination to Hoge. | |
| James C. McGrew | Republican | March 4, 1869 – March 3, 1873 | 2nd | Kingwood | Preston | Elected in 1868. Retired. | |
| David McKinley | Republican | January 3, 2011 – January 3, 2023 | 1st | Wheeling | Ohio | Elected in 2010. Redistricted and lost renomination to Mooney. | |
| Carol Miller | Republican | January 3, 2019 – January 3, 2023 | 3rd | Huntington | Cabell/Wayne | Elected in 2018. Redistricted to the 1st district. | |
| Carol Miller | Republican | January 3, 2023 – present | 1st | Huntington | Cabell/Wayne | Redistricted from the 3rd district and re-elected in 2022. Incumbent. | |
| Warren Miller | Republican | March 4, 1895 – March 3, 1899 | 4th | Ripley | Jackson | Elected in 1894. Retired. | |
| Alan Mollohan | Democratic | January 3, 1983 – January 3, 2011 | 1st | Fairmont | Marion | Elected in 1982. Lost renomination to Mike Oliverio. | |
| Bob Mollohan | Democratic | January 3, 1953 – January 3, 1957 | 1st | Parkersburg | Wood | Elected in 1952. Retired to run for governor. | |
| Bob Mollohan | Democratic | January 3, 1969 – January 3, 1983 | 1st | Parkersburg | Wood | Elected in 1968. Retired. | |
| Alex Mooney | Republican | January 3, 2015 – January 3, 2025 | 2nd | Charles Town | Jefferson | Elected in 2014. Retired to run for U.S. senator. | |
| Arch A. Moore, Jr. | Republican | January 3, 1957 – January 3, 1969 | 1st | Glen Dale | Marshall | Elected in 1956. Retired to run for governor. | |
| Riley Moore | Republican | January 3, 2025 – present | 2nd | Harpers Ferry | Jefferson | Elected in 2024. Incumbent. | |
| Hunter H. Moss, Jr. | Republican | March 4, 1913 – July 15, 1916 | 4th | Parkersburg | Wood | Elected in 1912. Died. | |
| Will E. Neal | Republican | January 3, 1953 – January 3, 1955 | 4th | Huntington | Cabell | Elected in 1952. Lost re-election to Burnside. | |
| Will E. Neal | Republican | January 3, 1957 – January 3, 1959 | 4th | Huntington | Cabell | Elected in 1956. Lost re-election to Hechler. | |
| Matthew M. Neely | Democratic | October 14, 1913 – March 3, 1921 | 1st | Fairmont | Marion | Elected to finish Davis's term. Lost re-election to Rosenbloom. | |
| Matthew M. Neely | Democratic | January 3, 1945 – January 3, 1947 | 1st | Fairmont | Marion | Elected in 1944. Lost re-election to Love. | |
| William S. O'Brien | Democratic | March 4, 1927 – March 3, 1929 | 3rd | Buckhannon | Upshur | Elected in 1926. Lost re-election to Wolverton. | |
| John O. Pendleton | Democratic | March 4, 1889 – February 26, 1890 | 1st | Wheeling | Ohio | Elected in 1888. Lost contested election to Atkinson. | |
| John O. Pendleton | Democratic | March 4, 1891 – March 3, 1895 | 1st | Wheeling | Ohio | Elected in 1890. Lost renomination. | |
| Daniel Haymond Polsley | Republican | March 4, 1867 – March 3, 1869 | 3rd | Fairmont | Marion | Elected in 1866. Retired. | |
| Nick Rahall | Democratic | January 3, 1977 – January 3, 1993 | 4th | Beckley | Raleigh | Elected in 1976. Redistricted to the 3rd district. | |
| Nick Rahall | Democratic | January 3, 1993 – January 3, 2015 | 3rd | Beckley | Raleigh | Redistricted from the 4th district and re-elected in 1992. Lost re-election to Jenkins. | |
| Robert L. Ramsay | Democratic | March 4, 1933 – January 3, 1939 | 1st | Follansbee | Brooke | Elected in 1932. Lost re-election to Schiffler. | |
| Robert L. Ramsay | Democratic | January 3, 1941 – January 3, 1943 | 1st | Follansbee | Brooke | Elected in 1940. Lost re-election to Schiffler. | |
| Robert L. Ramsay | Democratic | January 3, 1949 – January 3, 1953 | 1st | Follansbee | Brooke | Elected in 1948. Lost renomination to R. Mollohan. | |
| Jennings Randolph | Democratic | March 4, 1933 – January 3, 1947 | 2nd | Salem | Harrison | Elected in 1932. Lost re-election to M. Snyder. | |
| Stuart F. Reed | Republican | March 4, 1917 – March 3, 1925 | 3rd | Clarksburg | Harrison | Elected in 1916. Retired. | |
| Edward G. Rohrbough | Republican | January 3, 1943 – January 3, 1945 | 3rd | Buckhannon | Upshur | Elected in 1942. Lost re-election to Bailey. | |
| Edward G. Rohrbough | Republican | January 3, 1947 – January 3, 1949 | 3rd | Buckhannon | Upshur | Elected in 1946. Lost re-election to Bailey. | |
| Benjamin L. Rosenbloom | Republican | March 4, 1921 – March 3, 1925 | 1st | Wheeling | Ohio | Elected in 1920. Retired to run for U.S. senator. | |
| A. C. Schiffler | Republican | January 3, 1939 – January 3, 1941 | 1st | Wheeling | Ohio | Elected in 1938. Lost re-election to Ramsay. | |
| A. C. Schiffler | Republican | January 3, 1943 – January 3, 1945 | 1st | Wheeling | Ohio | Elected in 1942. Lost re-election to Neely. | |
| Hugh Ike Shott | Republican | March 4, 1929 – March 3, 1933 | 5th | Bluefield | Mercer | Elected in 1928. Lost re-election to J. Kee. | |
| John M. Slack, Jr. | Democratic | January 3, 1959 – January 3, 1963 | 6th | St. Albans | Kanawha | Elected in 1958. Redistricted to the 3rd district. | |
| John M. Slack, Jr. | Democratic | January 3, 1963 – March 17, 1980 | 3rd | St. Albans | Kanawha | Redistricted from the 6th district and re-elected in 1962. Died. | |
| Charles Brooks Smith | Republican | February 3, 1890 – March 3, 1891 | 4th | Parkersburg | Wood | Won contested election. Lost re-election to Capehart. | |
| Joe L. Smith | Democratic | March 4, 1929 – January 3, 1945 | 6th | Beckley | Raleigh | Elected in 1928. Retired. | |
| Charles P. Snyder | Democratic | May 15, 1883 – March 3, 1889 | 3rd | Charleston | Kanawha | Elected to finish Kenna's term. Retired. | |
| Melvin C. Snyder | Republican | March 4, 1947 – March 3, 1949 | 2nd | Kingwood | Preston | Elected in 1946. Lost re-election to Staggers. | |
| Harley O. Staggers | Democratic | January 3, 1949 – January 3, 1981 | 2nd | Keyser | Mineral | Elected in 1948. Retired. | |
| Harley O. Staggers, Jr. | Democratic | January 3, 1983 – January 3, 1993 | 2nd | Keyser | Mineral | Elected in 1982. Redistricted to the 1st district and lost renomination to A. Mollohan. | |
| Mick Staton | Republican | January 3, 1981 – January 3, 1983 | 3rd | South Charleston | Kanawha | Elected in 1980. Lost re-election to Wise. | |
| James F. Strother | Republican | March 4, 1925 – March 3, 1929 | 5th | Welch | McDowell | Elected in 1924. Retired. | |
| George Cookman Sturgiss | Republican | March 4, 1907 – March 3, 1911 | 2nd | Morgantown | Monongalia | Elected in 1906. Lost re-election to Brown Jr. | |
| Howard Sutherland | Republican | March 4, 1913 – March 3, 1917 | At-large | Elkins | Randolph | Elected in 1912. Retired to run for U.S. senator. | |
| J. Alfred Taylor | Democratic | March 4, 1923 – March 3, 1927 | 6th | Alderson | Greenbrier | Elected in 1922. Lost re-election to England. | |
| Kellian Van Rensalear Whaley | Union | December 7, 1863 – March 3, 1867 | 3rd | Point Pleasant | Mason | Elected in 1863. Retired. | |
| Benjamin Wilson | Democratic | March 4, 1875 – March 3, 1883 | 1st | Clarksburg | Harrison | Elected in 1874. Retired. | |
| William Lyne Wilson | Democratic | March 4, 1883 – March 3, 1895 | 2nd | Charles Town | Jefferson | Elected in 1882. Lost re-election to Dayton. | |
| Bob Wise | Democratic | January 3, 1983 – January 3, 1993 | 3rd | Charleston | Kanawha | Elected in 1982. Redistricted to the 2nd district. | |
| Bob Wise | Democratic | January 3, 1993 – January 3, 2001 | 2nd | Charleston | Kanawha | Redistricted from the 3rd district and re-elected in 1992. Retired to run for governor. | |
| John S. Witcher | Republican | March 4, 1869 – March 3, 1871 | 3rd | Huntington | Cabell | Elected in 1868. Lost re-election to Hereford. | |
| John M. Wolverton | Republican | March 4, 1925 – March 3, 1927 | 3rd | Richwood | Nicholas | Elected in 1924. Lost re-election to O'Brien. | |
| John M. Wolverton | Republican | March 4, 1929 – March 3, 1931 | 3rd | Richwood | Nicholas | Elected in 1928. Lost re-election to Hornor. | |
| Harry C. Woodyard | Republican | March 4, 1903 – March 3, 1911 | 4th | Spencer | Roane | Elected in 1902. Lost re-election to Hamilton. | |
| Harry C. Woodyard | Republican | November 7, 1916 – March 3, 1923 | 4th | Spencer | Roane | Elected to finish Moss's term. Lost re-election to Johnson. | |
| Harry C. Woodyard | Republican | March 4, 1925 – March 3, 1927 | 4th | Spencer | Roane | Elected in 1924. Retired. | |

== See also ==
- List of United States senators from West Virginia
- West Virginia's congressional delegations
- West Virginia's congressional districts

== Sources ==
- House of Representatives List of Members
