= Harry C. Woodyard =

American politician

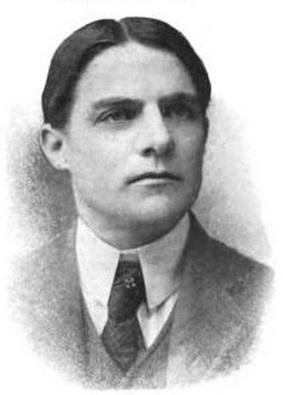
From Volume I of 1903's Men of West Virginia.

Harry Chapman Woodyard (November 13, 1867 – June 21, 1929) was a Republican politician from West Virginia who served as a United States representative. Woodyard was born in Spencer, West Virginia, in Roane County. He served as a member of the 58th through 61st United States Congresses, as a member of the 64th through 67th United States Congresses, and then to 69th United States Congress.

As a child, he attended the common schools. As a business man, he engaged in the wholesale grocery and lumber businesses. He was elected to West Virginia Senate in 1898. In 1902, he was elected as a Republican to the Fifty-eighth and to the three succeeding Congresses (March 4, 1903 – March 3, 1911). His 1910 candidacy for re-election was unsuccessful.

After the death of Hunter H. Moss, Jr., he was elected to the Sixty-fourth Congress to fill the vacancy. He won re-election to the Sixty-fifth, Sixty-sixth, and Sixty-seventh Congresses and served from November 7, 1916 to March 3, 1923. He was an unsuccessful candidate for re-election in 1922 to the Sixty-eighth Congress. He once again was elected in 1924 to the Sixty-ninth Congress (March 4, 1925 – March 3, 1927).

He was not a candidate for re-election to the Seventieth Congress and resumed his former business pursuits. He died in Spencer and was buried in Spencer Mausoleum.

== See also ==
- West Virginia's congressional delegations

== Sources ==
- United States Congress. "Harry C. Woodyard (id: W000737)". Biographical Directory of the United States Congress.

U.S. House of Representatives
Preceded by James A. Hughes	Member of the U.S. House of Representatives from West Virginia's 4th congressional district 1903–1911	Succeeded by John M. Hamilton
Preceded by Hunter Holmes Moss, Jr.	Member of the U.S. House of Representatives from West Virginia's 4th congressional district 1916–1923	Succeeded by George William Johnson
Preceded by George William Johnson	Member of the U.S. House of Representatives from West Virginia's 4th congressional district 1925–1927	Succeeded by James A. Hughes
