= Hubert S. Ellis =

American politician

Member of the U.S. House of Representatives from West Virginia's 4th district
- In office January 3, 1943 – January 3, 1949
- Preceded by: George W. Johnson
- Succeeded by: Maurice G. Burnside

Personal details
- Born: June 6, 1887 Hurricane, West Virginia
- Died: December 3, 1959 (aged 72) Huntington, West Virginia
- Party: Republican
- Education: Marshall University
- Occupation: Businessman

Hubert Summers Ellis (July 6, 1887 – December 3, 1959) was a Republican United States representative, banker and salesman from Huntington, West Virginia. He was elected as a Republican to the Seventy-eighth, Seventy-ninth, and Eightieth Congresses (January 3, 1943 – January 3, 1949).

Ellis was born in Hurricane, Putnam County, West Virginia in 1887. He attended the public schools and Marshall College in Huntington, West Virginia. He worked in banking and as a salesman from 1910 to 1917 and in the general insurance business in 1920. He served in World War I from 1917 - 1919 as a first lieutenant in the One Hundred and Fiftieth Field Artillery, Forty-second Division. He was elected to the House in 1942 and served three consecutive terms until 1949. His candidacies in 1948 and 1950 were unsuccessful. He was subsequently appointed West Virginia director for the Federal Housing Administration on February 2, 1954, and resigned on February 10, 1958. He died in Huntington on December 3, 1959, and is buried in Woodmere Cemetery.

== See also ==
- West Virginia's congressional delegations

U.S. House of Representatives
Preceded by George W. Johnson	Member of the U.S. House of Representatives from West Virginia's 4th congressional district 1943–1949	Succeeded by Maurice G. Burnside
