= Howard B. Lee =

American politician

Howard Burton Lee
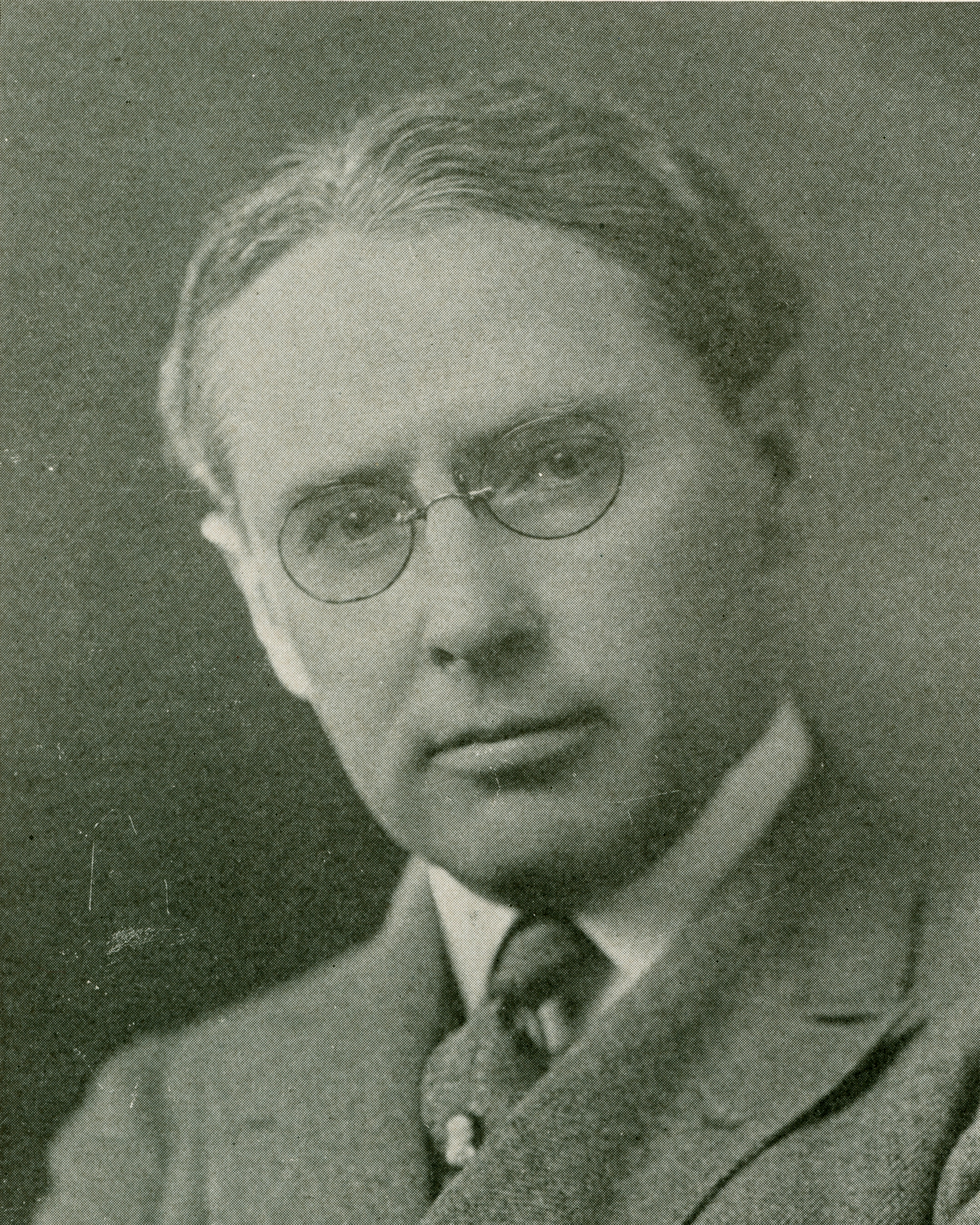

18th Attorney General of West Virginia
- In office 1925–1933
- Governor: Howard M. Gore
- Preceded by: Edward T. England
- Succeeded by: Homer A. Holt

Member of the West Virginia House of Delegates from Putnam County
- In office 1909–1911

Personal details
- Born: Howard Burton Lee; October 27, 1879 Wirt, West Virginia, U.S.
- Died: May 24, 1985 (aged 105) Stuart, Florida, U.S.
- Party: Republican
- Spouse: Ida Lenore Hamilton (m. 1906; died 1959)
- Education: Marshall College; Washington & Lee University
- Profession: Author, attorney

Howard Burton Lee (October 27, 1879 – May 24, 1985), of Mercer County, served as the Republican Attorney General of West Virginia from 1925 to 1933. His efforts to eliminate government corruption during that time helped to end the West Virginia Mine Wars.

Lee was born in Wirt County, West Virginia and graduated from Marshall College. He wrote a number of books including Bloodletting in Appalachia, The Story of the Constitution, The Criminal Trial in the Virginias, and The Burning Springs and Other Tales of the Little Kanawha. Lee died at the age of 105 at the Hobe Sound Geriatric Village nursing home in Stuart, Florida.

== See also ==
- List of attorneys general of West Virginia

Party political offices
Preceded by Edward T. England	Republican nominee for West Virginia Attorney General; 1924, 1928, 1932	Succeeded by Philip Hill
Legal offices
Preceded by Edward T. England	Attorney General of West Virginia; 1925–1933	Succeeded by Homer A. Holt
