= Eustace Gibson =

American politician

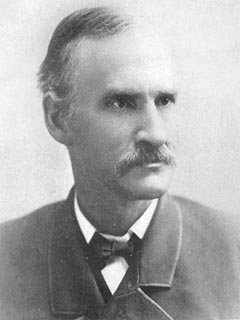

Member of the U.S. House of Representatives from West Virginia's 4th district
- In office March 4, 1883 – March 3, 1887
- Preceded by: n/a
- Succeeded by: Charles E. Hogg

Speaker of the West Virginia House of Delegates
- In office 1877
- Preceded by: Alexander W. Monroe
- Succeeded by: George H. Moffett

Personal details
- Born: October 4, 1842 Culpeper County, Virginia, US
- Died: December 10, 1900 (aged 58) Clifton Forge, Virginia, US
- Resting place: Huntington, West Virginia, US
- Party: Democratic
- Profession: Politician, Lawyer

Military service
- Allegiance: Confederate States
- Branch/service: Confederate States Army
- Years of service: 1861–1863
- Rank: Captain
- Battles/wars: American Civil War

Eustace Gibson (October 4, 1842 – December 10, 1900) was a Democratic politician and lawyer in the Commonwealth of Virginia, who served in the Confederate Army and in the Virginia Constitutional Convention of 1868. He moved to the State of West Virginia, where he served as a delegate and Speaker of the West Virginia House of Delegates, and then as representative from the now-defunct Fourth Congressional District of West Virginia for the U.S. House of Representatives.

== Early and family life ==
Eustace Gibson was born in Culpeper County, Virginia on October 4, 1842, to lawyer Jonathan C. Gibson, Sr. and his second wife Mary Shackleford. He and his brothers received a private education, although their father died in 1849 when Eustace was a boy. He studied law and was admitted to the bar. He opened his law practice in 1861.

== Virginia career ==
Gibson entered the Confederate States Army in June 1861 as first lieutenant of the Sperryville Rifles, serving under his brother Jonathan C. Gibson who would rise to the rank of colonel of the 49th Virginia Infantry. Eustace was promoted to captain in 1863 and retired as a result of his severe abdominal wound at the Battle of Gettysburg. After the war, Gibson decided to practice in the mountains of southwest Virginia, rather than the north-central Piedmont region where his father had practiced and later his brother J.C. Gibson was practicing. Voters from Pulaski and Giles Counties elected this Gibson to represent them at the Virginia Constitutional Convention of 1868, and voters from his native Culpeper County elected his brother J.C. Gibson as one of their representatives.

== West Virginia career ==
Gibson moved to Huntington, West Virginia in 1871. Voters elected him to the West Virginia House of Delegates in 1876 and he was re-elected in 1878 after fellow delegates elected him their speaker in 1877.

In 1882, voters elected Gibson as a Democrat to the 48th United States Congress. He defeated local Judge Robert S. Brown, who ran in part on a temperance platform. Gibson was re-elected in 1884 to the 49th United States Congress, serving from March 4, 1883, to March 3, 1887. While a member of the Forty-ninth Congress, he served as a chairman of the Committee on Expenditures in the Department of Justice. His candidacies for renomination in 1886 and for nomination in 1888 were unsuccessful. Afterward, he returned to the practice of law.

== Death ==
Gibson died in Clifton Forge, Virginia, on December 10, 1900.

== See also ==
- West Virginia's congressional delegations

== Sources ==
Political offices
Preceded by Alexander W. Monroe	Speaker of the WV House of Delegates; 1877–1879	Succeeded by George H. Moffett
U.S. House of Representatives
Preceded by n/a	Member of the U.S. House of Representatives from West Virginia's 4th congressional district 1883–1887	Succeeded by Charles E. Hogg
