= Hunter H. Moss Jr. =

American politician and lawyer

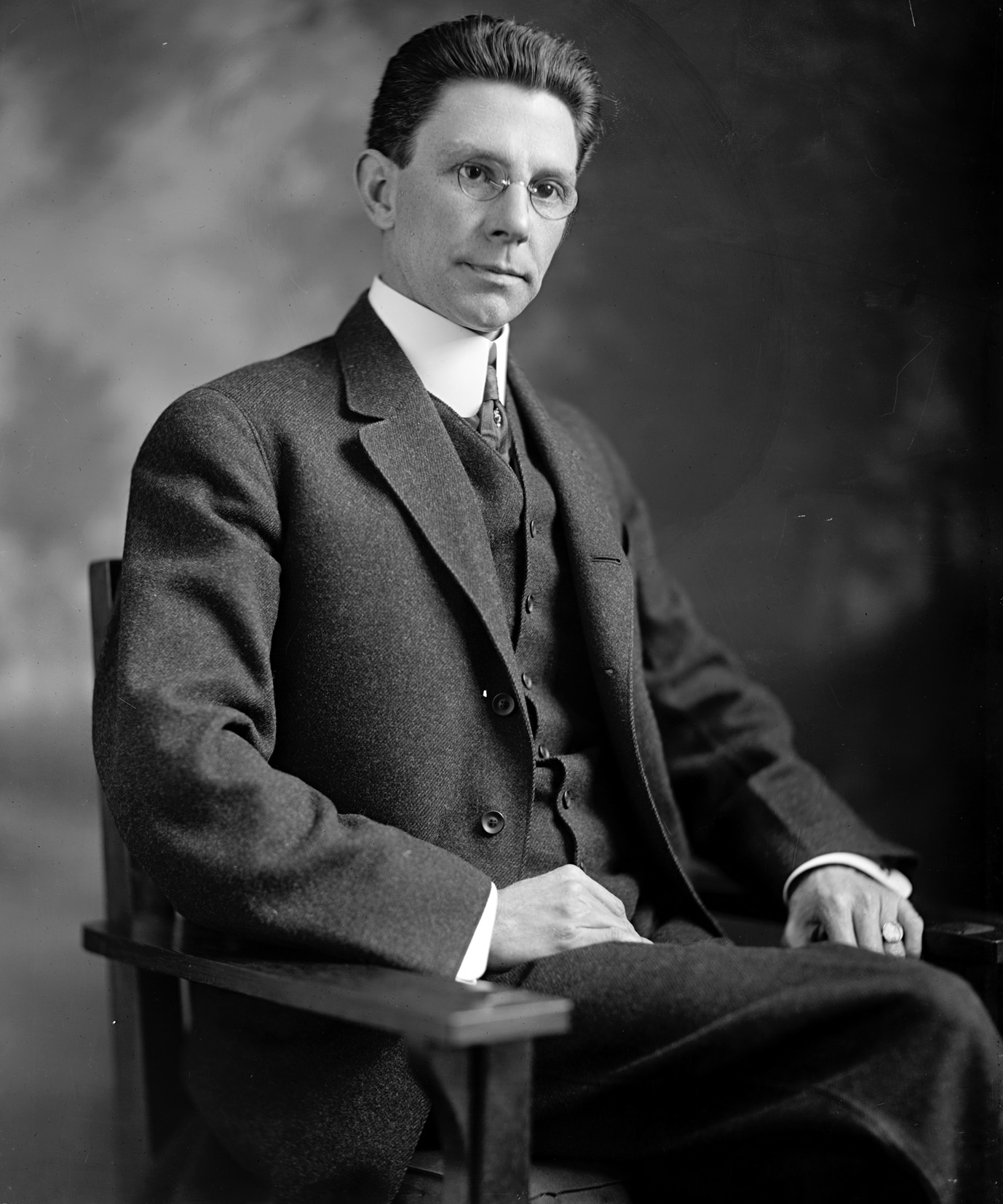
Moss c. 1910

Hunter Holmes Moss Jr. (May 26, 1874 – July 15, 1916) was a lawyer and Republican politician from West Virginia who served as a United States representative. Moss was born in Parkersburg in Wood County, West Virginia. He was a member of the 63rd and 64th United States congresses.

Moss attended the public schools and worked in a bank in early youth. He was admitted to the bar after graduating from the law department of West Virginia University at Morgantown in 1896. The same year, he opened his legal practice in Parkersburg.

He served as prosecuting attorney for Wood County from 1900 to 1904. In 1904, Moss became a judge serving on the Fourth circuit court of West Virginia until 1912. In that year, he was elected to Congress as a Republican. He served from March 4, 1913, until his death in Atlantic City, New Jersey. He is interred at Odd Fellows Cemetery in Parkersburg.

Moss was an uncle of the American journalist and historian Holmes Alexander, a former member of the Maryland House of Delegates.

== See also ==
- West Virginia's congressional delegations
- List of members of the United States Congress who died in office (1900–1949)

== Sources ==
- United States Congress. "Hunter H. Moss Jr. (id: M001034)". Biographical Directory of the United States Congress.
- Hunter H. Moss, Jr., late a representative from West Virginia, Memorial addresses delivered in the House of Representatives and Senate frontispiece 1917

U.S. House of Representatives
Preceded by John M. Hamilton	Member of the U.S. House of Representatives from West Virginia's 4th congressional district 1913–1916	Succeeded by Harry C. Woodyard
