= George C. Sturgiss =

American politician (1842–1925)

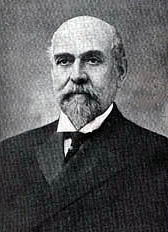

Judge of the Monongalia County Circuit Court
- In office 1912–1920

Member of the U.S. House of Representatives from West Virginia's 2nd district
- In office March 4, 1907 – March 3, 1911
- Preceded by: Thomas B. Davis
- Succeeded by: William Gay Brown, Jr.

Member of the West Virginia House of Delegates
- In office 1870-1872

Personal details
- Born: George Cookman Sturgiss; August 16, 1842 Poland, Ohio, U.S.
- Died: February 26, 1925 (aged 82)
- Resting place: Oak Grove Cemetery
- Party: Republican

George Cookman Sturgiss (August 16, 1842 – February 26, 1925) was an American lawyer and Republican politician who served as United States Representative for West Virginia's 2nd congressional district. He was a member of the 60th and 61st United States Congresses.

== Biography ==
Sturgiss was born in Poland, Ohio in Mahoning County and attended country schools. In 1859, he moved to Morgantown, Virginia (now West Virginia). He attended and then taught at Monongalia Academy in Morgantown. He was admitted to the bar in 1863 and entered practice at Morgantown. During the Civil War he served as a clerk under Maj. James V. Boughner, paymaster of United States Volunteers. After the war, he became superintendent of free schools for Monongalia County and served in that capacity from 1865 to 1869.

From 1870 to 1872, Sturgiss was a member of the West Virginia House of Delegates. He then served as prosecuting attorney from 1872 to 1880. He became Republican nominee for Governor in 1880 but lost to Jacob B. Jackson. Subsequently, he was appointed by President Benjamin Harrison as United States Attorney for the district of West Virginia in 1889 and served four years. He was the first president of the State board of trade and of the State association for the promotion of good roads.

In 1906, Sturgiss was elected as a Republican to the Sixtieth and then to the Sixty-first Congress (March 4, 1907 – March 3, 1911). His candidacy for re-election in 1910 to the Sixty-second Congress was unsuccessful. He then became a trustee of American University in Washington, D.C. He was instrumental in the construction of the Morgantown & Kingwood Railroad. He served on the bench as a judge of the circuit court from 1912 to 1920.

In 1919, while he was serving on the Circuit Court of Monongalia County, impeachment proceedings were initiated against Sturgiss. The Judiciary Committee of the West Virginia House of Delegates found that he was guilty of corruption, but the full West Virginia House of Delegates voted against impeachment, with the question of impeachment being voted on 28–55.

Sturgiss practiced law at Morgantown until his death on February 26, 1925, and was buried at Oak Grove Cemetery.

== See also ==
- West Virginia's congressional delegations

== Sources ==
- United States Congress. "George C. Sturgiss (id: S001049)". Biographical Directory of the United States Congress.

Party political offices
Preceded by Nathan Goff Jr.	Republican nominee for Governor of West Virginia; 1880	Succeeded by Edwin Maxwell
U.S. House of Representatives
Preceded by Thomas B. Davis	Member of the U.S. House of Representatives from West Virginia's 2nd congressional district 1907–1911	Succeeded by William Gay Brown, Jr.
