= Samuel V. Woods =

American politician

Samuel V. Woods was the Democratic President of the West Virginia Senate from Barbour County and served from 1913 to 1915. He was the son of West Virginia Supreme Court judge, Samuel Woods. He was born on 13 August 1856 in Barbour County. He is an alumnus of West Virginia University.

Political offices
Preceded by Henry D. Hatfield	President of the WV Senate; 1913–1915	Succeeded by Edward T. England
