= 1880 West Virginia gubernatorial election =

- October 12, 1880
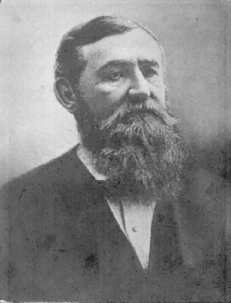

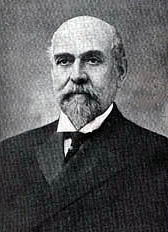

Nominee	Jacob B. Jackson	George Cookman Sturgiss	N. B. French
Party	Democratic	Republican	Greenback
Popular vote	60,991	44,855	13,027
Percentage	51.31%	37.73%	10.96%
- County results Jackson: 30–40% 40–50% 50–60% 60–70% 70–80% 80–90% >90% Sturgiss: 40–50% 50–60% 60–70%
Governor before election
Henry M. Mathews
Democratic
Elected Governor
Jacob B. Jackson
Democratic

The 1880 West Virginia gubernatorial election took place on October 12, 1880, to elect the governor of West Virginia.

== Results ==
West Virginia gubernatorial election, 1880
Party	Candidate	Votes	%
Democratic	Jacob B. Jackson	60,991	51.31
Republican	George C. Sturgiss	44,855	37.73
Greenback	N. B. French	13,027	10.96
Total votes		118,873	100
Democratic hold			
