= A. C. Schiffler =

American attorney and politician

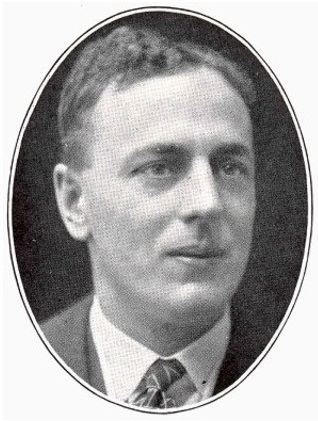

Member of the U.S. House of Representatives from West Virginia's 1st district
- In office January 3, 1943 – January 3, 1945; January 3, 1939 – January 3, 1941
- Preceded by: Robert L. Ramsay
- Succeeded by: Matthew M. Neely; Robert L. Ramsay

Personal details
- Born: August 10, 1889 Wheeling, West Virginia, U.S.
- Died: March 27, 1970 (aged 80) Wheeling, West Virginia, U.S
- Resting place: Mount Calvary Cemetery
- Party: Republican

Andrew Charles Schiffler (August 10, 1889 – March 27, 1970) was a two-term Republican United States representative and attorney from West Virginia. He served in the Seventy-sixth Congress (January 3, 1939 – January 3, 1941); and the Seventy-eighth Congress (January 3, 1943 – January 3, 1945).

== Biography ==
He was born in Wheeling, West Virginia.

After graduating from the public schools, he studied law in Wheeling law offices. In 1913, he was admitted to the bar and entered legal practice in Wheeling. He served as a bankruptcy referee for the northern district of West Virginia from 1918 to 1922.

From 1925 until 1932, he served as prosecuting attorney for Ohio County.

He was Ohio County Republican Committee Chairman from 1936 to 1938.

=== Congress ===
He was first elected to the U.S. House in 1938. His candidacy for re-election in 1940 was unsuccessful. He returned to the House after winning the 1942 election.

=== Later career and death ===
After his unsuccessful re-election attempt in 1944, he returned to his law practice. He remained an active attorney until his death in Wheeling on March 27, 1970. He was buried in Mount Calvary Cemetery.

== See also ==
- West Virginia's congressional delegations

== Sources ==
- SCHIFFLER, Andrew Charles, (1889 - 1970) Online. September 9, 2007.
- SEVENTY-SIXTH CONGRESS (pdf). Online. September 9, 2007.
- SEVENTY-EIGHTH CONGRESS (pdf) Online. September 9, 2007.

U.S. House of Representatives
Preceded by Robert L. Ramsay	Member of the U.S. House of Representatives from West Virginia's 1st congressional district 1939–1941	Succeeded by Robert L. Ramsay
Preceded by Robert L. Ramsay	Member of the U.S. House of Representatives from West Virginia's 1st congressional district 1943–1945	Succeeded by Matthew M. Neely
