= Charles A. Sinsel =

American politician

Charles A. Sinsel (5 June 1864 - 8 December 1923) was the Republican president of the West Virginia Senate from Taylor County and served from 1919 to 1921.

Political offices
Preceded by Wells Goodykoontz	President of the West Virginia Senate; 1919–1921	Succeeded by Gohen C. Arnold
