= Edward Cooper (West Virginia politician) =

American politician and businessman

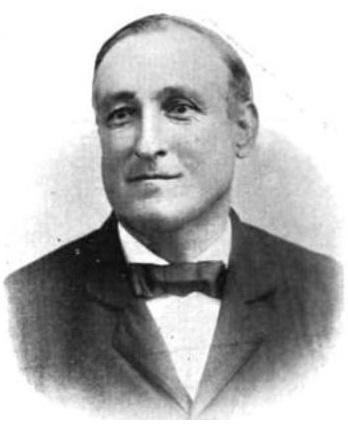
From Volume I of 1903's Men of West Virginia

Edward Cooper (February 26, 1873 – March 1, 1928) was an American lawyer and Republican politician who represented West Virginia in the United States House of Representatives during the 64th and 65th United States Congresses from 1915 to 1919.

Cooper was born in Trevorton, Pennsylvania. He moved with his parents to Fayette County, West Virginia in 1875 where he attended public and private schools. He graduated from Washington and Lee University, Lexington, Virginia in 1892, and subsequently from the law department of the same university. He was admitted to the bar in 1894 and practiced law for three years in Bramwell, West Virginia where he was also a member of the town council for eight years.

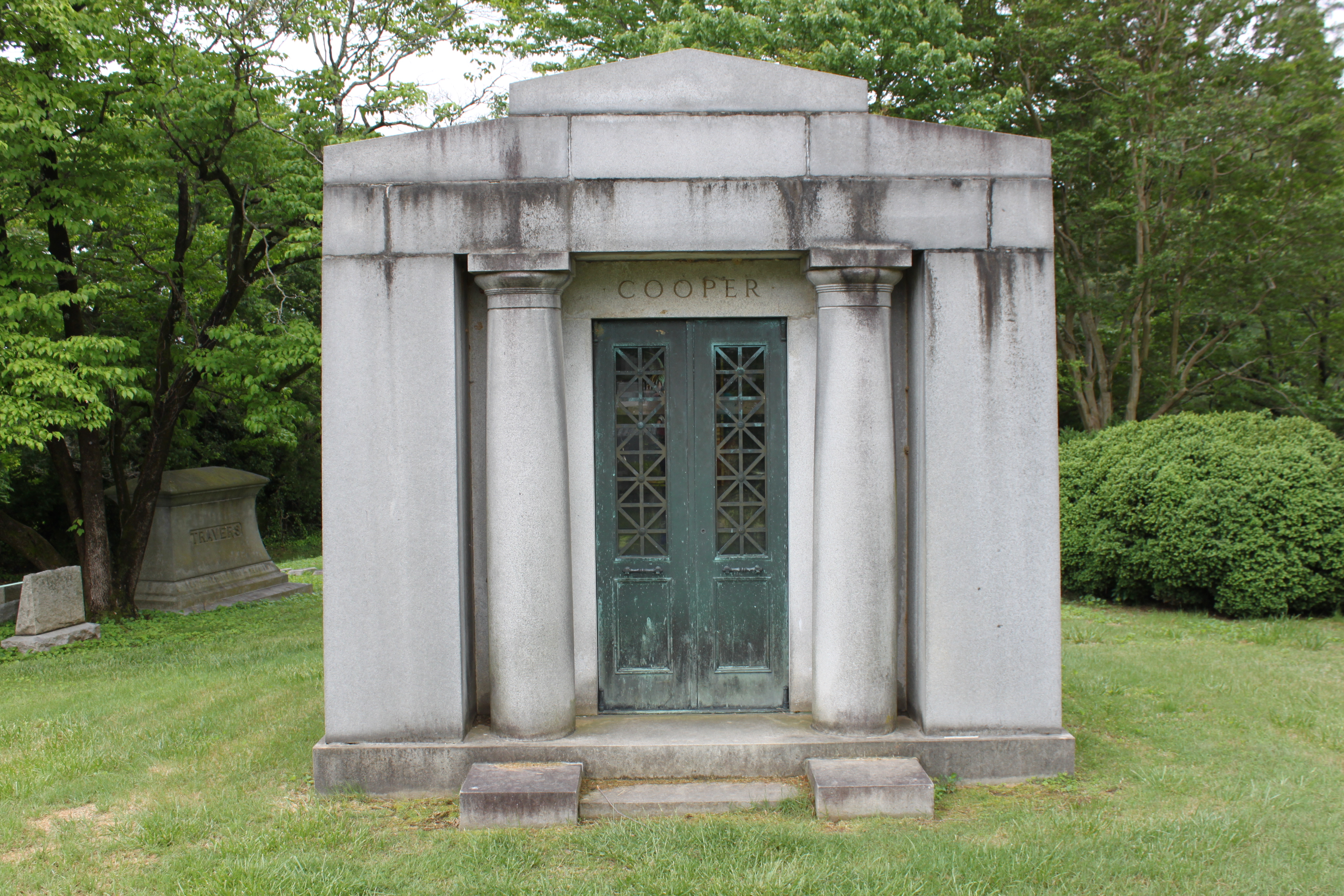
Mausoleum of Cooper at Hollywood Cemetery

On the death of his father, Cooper abandoned the practice of law and engaged in the development of coal properties in West Virginia. He was a delegate to the Republican National Convention in 1912 and elected as a Republican to the Sixty-fourth and Sixty-fifth Congresses (March 4, 1915 – March 3, 1919). He was unsuccessful candidate for reelection in 1918 to the Sixty-sixth Congress. After leaving Congress, he again engaged in the production of coal in Mercer and McDowell Counties, West Virginia and served as a director in several coal companies. He died in Bluefield, West Virginia in 1928 and was buried in Hollywood Cemetery, Richmond, Virginia.

== See also ==
- West Virginia's congressional delegations
- List of United States representatives from West Virginia

== Sources ==
- United States Congress. "Edward Cooper (id: C000748)". Biographical Directory of the United States Congress.

U.S. House of Representatives
Preceded by James A. Hughes	Member of the U.S. House of Representatives from West Virginia's 5th congressional district 1915-1919	Succeeded by Wells Goodykoontz
