= Jonathan C. Gibson Sr. =

American politician (1793–1849)

Jonathan C. Gibson

Member of the Virginia House of Delegates from the Culpeper district
- In office January 13, 1831 – December 4, 1831 Serving with Edmund Broadus
- Preceded by: Joseph S. Hansbrough
- Succeeded by: John S. Pendleton

Personal details
- Born: 1793 Culpeper County, Virginia, U.S.
- Died: 1849 (aged 55–56) Culpeper County, Virginia, U.S.
- Occupation: lawyer, farmer, soldier

Military service
- Allegiance: United States of America
- Branch/service: Virginia militia
- Years of service: 1813-1814
- Rank: Major
- Battles/wars: War of 1812

Jonathan Catlett Gibson Sr. (1793– Dec. 9, 1849) was a nineteenth-century Virginia farmer, lawyer, politician and War of 1812 veteran, whose five sons would fight for the Confederate States of America, including three sons who followed in his footsteps and became lawyers, of which two served in the Virginia House of Delegates and West Virginia House of Delegates.

== Early and family life ==
J.C. Gibson married Martha Dandridge Ball, daughter of Col. Burgess Ball and George Washington's niece Frances Ann Washington, but she died when their two daughters were infants. In 1824 the widower Gibson remarried, to Mary Williams Shackelford. They had five sons (all of whom would enlist in the Confederate States Army as discussed below), and six daughters.

== Career ==
The elder J.C. Gibson enlisted twice in J.R. Gilbert's company of Virginia militia for service in the War of 1812, in July 1813 and January 1814. He eventually rose in the local militia, and when General Lafayette traveled to visit President Madison at his estate, Montpelier in nearby Orange in 1824, Major Gibson led a mounted fifty man volunteer escort.

Following the war, Gibson returned to farm using enslaved labor, as well as practice law in Culpeper County (slightly north of Albemarle but still in Virginia's Piedmont region). Gibson's plantation was named "Dandridge" in memory of his first wife's ancestors. He owned 7 slaves in the 1820 census, 20 slaves in the 1830 census, and at least 23 slaves in the 1840 census, the last before his death.

In a contested election in 1830, J.C. Gibson Sr. defeated incumbent Joseph S. Hansbrough to represent Culpeper County part-time in the Virginia House of Delegates, serving alongside Edmund Broadus. The following year, Gibson became one of the three commissioners charged with raising $1500 to build a bridge across the Rapidan River.

== Death and legacy ==
Gibson died on December 9, 1849, after a stroke.

The Huntington Library in California has some papers relating to Gibson, transferred through his daughter Frances, who married twice, both to Alabamians and whose daughter Martha (a/k/a "Mattie") would marry Issac Jordon Stone, who moved his family to North Carolina and ultimately California, where his mother-in-law lived her final years.

During the American Civil War, all five of his sons would enlist in the Confederate Army. William St. Pierre Gibson would become Lieutenant of the "Little Fork Rangers" (4th Virginia Cavalry) and die at the Battle of Antietam. Jonathan C. Gibson Jr. would become Captain of the Sperryville Rifles (Company K of the 49th Virginia Infantry) survive the war and like his father serve in the Virginia House of Delegates. Edwin (Ned) Gibson would leave his studies at the Virginia Military Institute to serve with his brothers in the Sperryville Rifles as a Sergeant, but later served with Mosby's Rangers, John Williams Gibson would become a private with Crenshaw's Battery of Virginia Artillery, and Eustace Gibson would become captain and quartermaster of the Sperryville Rifles and later a lawyer, member of the West Virginia House of Delegates and the U.S. House of Representatives.
