= 1966 United States Senate election in West Virginia =

- November 8, 1966
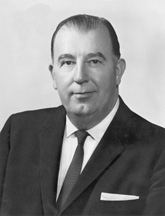

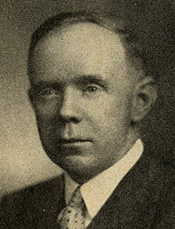
Nominee	Jennings Randolph	Francis J. Love
Party	Democratic	Republican
Popular vote	292,325	198,891
Percentage	59.51%	40.49%
- County results Randolph: 50–60% 60–70% 70–80% Love: 50–60% 60–70% 70–80%
U.S. senator before election
Jennings Randolph
Democratic
Elected U.S. Senator
Jennings Randolph
Democratic

The 1966 United States Senate election in West Virginia was held on November 8, 1966. Incumbent Democratic U.S. Senator Jennings Randolph won re-election to a third term and a second full term.

== Primary elections ==
Primary elections were held on May 10, 1966.

=== Democratic primary ===
==== Candidate ====
- Jennings Randolph, incumbent U.S. Senator

==== Results ====
Democratic Party primary results
Party	Candidate	Votes	%
Democratic	Jennings Randolph (incumbent)	204,381	100.00%
Total votes		204,381	100.00%

=== Republican primary ===
==== Candidate ====
- Harold G. Cutright, business consultant and unsuccessful candidate for Democratic nomination for Governor in 1964
- Francis J. Love, former U.S. Congressman

==== Results ====
Republican Party primary results
Party	Candidate	Votes	%
Republican	Francis J. Love	61,479	63.38%
Republican	Harold G. Cutright	35,530	36.63%
Total votes		97,009	100.00%

== General election ==
=== Result ===
United States Senate election in West Virginia, 1966
Party	Candidate	Votes	%	±%
Democratic	Jennings Randolph (incumbent)	292,325	59.51%	
Republican	Francis J. Love	198,891	40.49%	
Total votes		491,216	100.00%	
Democratic hold				

== See also ==
- 1966 United States Senate elections

== Bibliography ==
- Congressional Elections, 1946-1996. Washington, D.C.: Congressional Quarterly Inc. 1998. ISBN 1-56802-248-4.
- Scammon, Richard M., ed. (1968). America Votes 7: a handbook of contemporary American election statistics, 1966. Washington, D.C.: Governmental Affairs Institute.
