= Holmes Alexander =

American historian, journalist, and politician (1906–1985)

Holmes Moss Alexander

Member of Maryland House of Delegates
- In office 1931–1935

Personal details
- Born: January 19, 1906 Parkersburg, West Virginia, U.S.
- Died: December 5, 1985 (aged 79)
- Resting place: Saint Thomas Episcopal Church Cemetery in Owings Mills, Maryland
- Party: Democratic
- Spouse: Mary Morgan Barksdale Alexander
- Education: Princeton University (BA)
- Occupation: journalist

Holmes Moss Alexander (January 29, 1906 – December 5, 1985) was an American journalist, syndicated columnist, and politician, originally from Parkersburg, West Virginia.

== Early life and education ==
The son of Charles Butler Alexander, an insurance official, and Margaret (née Moss), Alexander was educated at Princeton (B.A. 1928) and Trinity College, Cambridge (1928–9). He worked as an English teacher and wrestling coach in Maryland until 1931.

== Career ==
From 1931 to 1935, Alexander was a member of the all-Democratic delegation from Baltimore County to the Maryland House of Delegates.

Typical of Alexander's newspaper columns was one that he wrote on Democratic Governor George Wallace of Alabama, who when term-limited in 1966 ran his wife, Lurleen Burns Wallace, as a surrogate gubernatorial candidate, against Republican U.S. Representative James D. Martin. Known for his opposition to school desegregation, Wallace procured passage of a series of state laws promptly struck down by federal courts, which required the implementation of Brown v. Board of Education. Alexander writes: "Though Wallace has lost every fight with Washington, Alabamians are convinced he has come off the winner."

Alexander's books include The American Talleyrand: Martin Van Buren (1935), Aaron Burr: The Proud Pretender (1937), American Nabob (1939), and Selena: A Romantic Novel (1941). Other Alexander works include Pen and Politics: The Autobiography of a Working Writer, How to Read The Federalist, To Covet Honor: A Biography of Alexander Hamilton, The Spirit of '76, Washington and Lee: A Study in Will to Win, Seattle: Growth of the City, Tokyo: Growth of the City, Hong Kong: Growth of the City, Beijing: Growth of the City, Shanghai: Growth of the City, and Vancouver, British Columbia: The Growth of the City/State. His last publication, Never Lose a War: Memoirs and Observations of a National Columnist, was released in 1984, the year before his death.

== Personal life ==
Alexander's maternal uncle, Hunter Holmes Moss, Jr., was a circuit judge and then a Republican member of the United States House of Representatives from West Virginia from 1913 until his death in 1916.

Alexander was married to the former Mary Morgan Barksdale; they had two sons and a daughter.

Alexander died on December 5, 1985, from a heart ailment.
