= Will E. Neal =

American politician

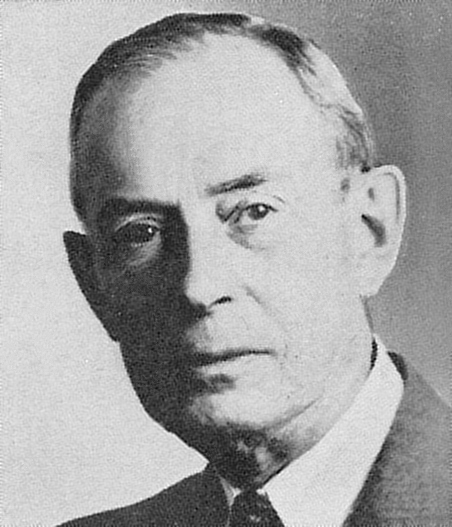

Member of the U.S. House of Representatives from West Virginia's 4th district
- In office January 3, 1957 – January 3, 1959
- Preceded by: Maurice G. Burnside
- Succeeded by: Ken Hechler
- In office January 3, 1953 – January 3, 1955
- Preceded by: Maurice G. Burnside
- Succeeded by: Maurice G. Burnside

Member of the West Virginia House of Delegates from Cabell County
- In office December 1, 1950 – December 1, 1952
- Preceded by: W. Arch Leap

Mayor of Huntington
- In office 1925–1928
- Preceded by: Floyd S. Chapman
- Succeeded by: J. Boyce Taylor

Personal details
- Born: William Elmer Neal; October 14, 1875 Fayette Township, Ohio, United States
- Died: November 12, 1959 (aged 84) Huntington, West Virginia, United States
- Resting place: Spring Hill Cemetery
- Party: Republican
- Education: National Normal University; University of Cincinnati
- Occupation: physician

William Elmer Neal (October 14, 1875 – November 12, 1959) was a physician and U.S. representative from West Virginia.

== Biography ==
Born on a farm near Proctorville, Ohio, Neal attended the public schools. He graduated from Proctorville High School in 1894. He taught school in Ohio and Kentucky for six years. He graduated from National Normal University, Lebanon, Ohio, in 1900 and received a medical degree from the University of Cincinnati in 1906. He commenced the general practice of medicine in Huntington, West Virginia, in 1907. Neal served as mayor of Huntington 1925-1928. He served as member of Huntington Park Board 1931-1952, and West Virginia Public Health Council 1936-1940. He was elected to the West Virginia House of Delegates in 1951 and 1952.

Neal was elected as a Republican to the Eighty-third Congress (January 3, 1953 – January 3, 1955), defeating the incumbent Congressman and former Marshall professor Maurice G. Burnside. Burnside sought a rematch in 1954, and defeated Neal for reelection to the Eighty-fourth Congress. He served as medical consultant to Foreign Operations Administration in Afghanistan from February 17, 1955, to June 20, 1955.

Neal challenged Burnside a third time in 1956 and was elected to the Eighty-fifth Congress (January 3, 1957 – January 3, 1959). Neal did not sign the 1956 Southern Manifesto and voted in favor of the Civil Rights Acts of 1957. He was defeated for reelection in 1958 by another Marshall professor, Ken Hechler, to the Eighty-sixth Congress. A Republican would not retake this Huntington-based seat, now numbered as the 3rd District, until 2014.

He died in Huntington, West Virginia, November 12, 1959 and was interred there in Spring Hill Cemetery.

== See also ==
- List of United States representatives from West Virginia
- List of mayors of Huntington, West Virginia

== Sources ==
- United States Congress. "Will E. Neal (id: N000017)". Biographical Directory of the United States Congress.

U.S. House of Representatives
Preceded by Maurice G. Burnside	Member of the U.S. House of Representatives from West Virginia's 4th congressional district 1953–1955	Succeeded by Maurice G. Burnside
Preceded by Maurice G. Burnside	Member of the U.S. House of Representatives from West Virginia's 4th congressional district 1957–1959	Succeeded by Ken Hechler
