= Edward T. England =

American politician (1869–1934)

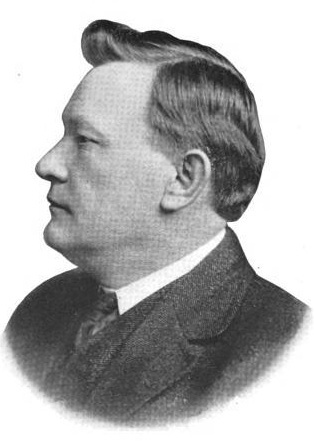

Member of the U.S. House of Representatives from West Virginia's 6th district
- In office March 4, 1927 – March 4, 1929
- Preceded by: J. Alfred Taylor
- Succeeded by: Joe L. Smith

Attorney General of West Virginia
- In office 1917–1925
- Governor: John J. Cornwell; Ephraim F. Morgan
- Preceded by: Armistead Abraham Lilly
- Succeeded by: Howard B. Lee

President of the West Virginia Senate
- In office 1915–1917
- Preceded by: Samuel V. Woods
- Succeeded by: Wells Goodykoontz

Personal details
- Born: Edward Theodore England; September 29, 1869 Gay, West Virginia, U.S.
- Died: September 9, 1934 (aged 64) Cleveland, Ohio, U.S.
- Party: Republican

Edward Theodore England (September 29, 1869 – September 9, 1934) was a lawyer and politician from West Virginia. He served in the West Virginia Senate, as Attorney General of West Virginia, and as a member of the United States House of Representatives.

== Early and family life ==
England was born in Gay, West Virginia, on September 29, 1869, to the former Mary Welch and her husband Andrew J.S. England. He attended the local schools, and in 1892 graduated from Concord Normal School in Athens, West Virginia. After teaching school for several years, England attended law school at Southern Normal University in Huntingdon, Tennessee. He graduated in 1898.

== Career ==
After being admitted to the bar in 1898, England began his legal practice in Oceana, West Virginia. In 1901 England moved to Logan, West Virginia (the county seat of Logan County, West Virginia), where he continued to practice law. In 1903 voters elected England as mayor of Logan. In 1908 he won election to the West Virginia Senate, serving from 1908 to 1916, and including as Senate President in 1915. Because West Virginia has no Lieutenant Governor, the Senate President is next in line to the governorship. As a result, England attended the first meeting of all the lieutenant governors in the United States in 1915. When they convened at Rhea Springs, Tennessee, England was chosen to preside.

In 1916, England won a statewide election and became Attorney General of West Virginia, serving from 1917 to 1925. In 1923 he was elected president of the Attorney Generals' Association of the United States. In 1924 he was an unsuccessful candidate for the Republican nomination for Governor.

In 1926 England was elected to the Seventieth Congress (March 4, 1927 – March 3, 1929). He was an unsuccessful candidate for reelection in 1928.

After leaving Congress England resumed the practice of law in Charleston, West Virginia.

== Death and legacy ==
England died in Cleveland, Ohio, on September 9, 1934, and was interred at Sunset Memorial Park in Charleston.

Party political offices
Preceded by Armistead Abraham Lilly	Republican nominee for West Virginia Attorney General; 1916, 1920	Succeeded by Howard B. Lee
Political offices
Preceded by Samuel V. Woods	President of the West Virginia Senate; 1915–1917	Succeeded by Wells Goodykoontz
Legal offices
Preceded by Armistead Abraham Lilly	Attorney General of West Virginia; 1917–1925	Succeeded by Howard B. Lee
U.S. House of Representatives
Preceded by J. Alfred Taylor	Member of the U.S. House of Representatives from West Virginia's 6th congressional district 1927–1929	Succeeded by Joe L. Smith
