= Francis J. Love =

American attorney and politician

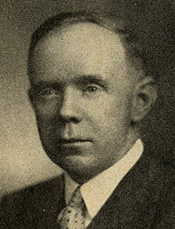

Member of the U.S. House of Representatives from West Virginia's 1st district
- In office January 3, 1947 – January 3, 1949
- Preceded by: Matthew M. Neely
- Succeeded by: Robert L. Ramsay

Personal details
- Born: Francis Johnson Love; January 23, 1901 Cadiz, Ohio, U.S.
- Died: October 30, 1989 (aged 88) Wheeling, West Virginia, U.S
- Party: Republican
- Education: West Virginia University
- Profession: Attorney

Francis Johnson Love (January 23, 1901 – October 30, 1989) was an American lawyer and politician who served one term as a Republican U.S. Congressman from West Virginia from 1947 to 1949.

== Biography ==
Love was born in Cadiz, Harrison County, Ohio, on January 23, 1901. He attended public schools, then attended Bethany College in Bethany, West Virginia, where he received an A.B. degree in 1924.

Francis Love served as the principal of Warwood High School in Wheeling, West Virginia from 1926 to 1929. He attended West Virginia University Law School at Morgantown and received his J.D. degree in 1932. Admitted to the bar the same year, Love commenced the practice of law in Wheeling.

=== Congress ===
Love was elected as a Republican to the Eightieth Congress (January 3, 1947 – January 3, 1949) from a district that rotated the parties in office every two years. He was predictably unsuccessful for reelection in 1948 to the Eighty-first Congress, losing to the Democrat Robert L. Ramsay. Love was the Republican nominee again in 1950 and 1952, but was unable to regain his former seat in the House, the cyclical alternation of the parties broken.

=== After Congress ===
Love, former Republican Chair of Ohio County, was one of two who greeted Sen. Joseph McCarthy when he arrived at the Wheeling airport to give his notorious address to the Lincoln Day Dinner in 1950. When Sen. Millard Tydings’ committee sent a former FBI agent to interview the Wheeling Intelligencer reporter who had reported McCarthy’s speech, it was Love who sat in on the interview. He resumed the general practice of law and served as delegate to Republican National Conventions in 1956, 1960, 1964, and 1968. As the Republican candidate for the U.S. Senate in 1966, Love campaigned for a negotiated withdrawal from the war in Vietnam and was defeated by Jennings Randolph by a margin of 60 to 40%.

=== Death ===
Congressman Love was a resident of Wheeling until his death in October 1989.

== See also ==
- List of United States representatives from West Virginia

Party political offices
Preceded by Cecil H. Underwood	Republican nominee for U.S. Senator from West Virginia (Class 2); 1966	Succeeded by Louise Leonard
U.S. House of Representatives
Preceded by Matthew M. Neely	Member of the U.S. House of Representatives from West Virginia's 1st congressional district 1947–1949	Succeeded by Robert L. Ramsay
