= Wells Goodykoontz =

American politician

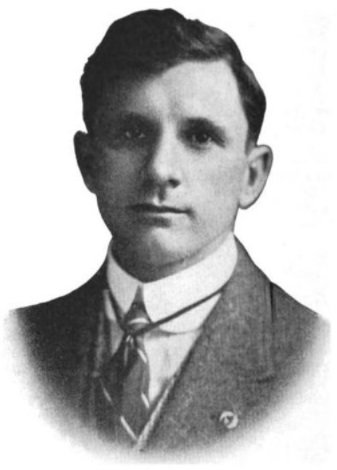
- From 1918's West Virginia Legislative Hand Book and Manual and Official Register

Member of the U.S. House of Representatives from West Virginia's 5th district
- In office March 4, 1919 – March 3, 1923
- Preceded by: Edward Cooper
- Succeeded by: Thomas Jefferson Lilly

President of the West Virginia Senate
- In office 1917 – December 1, 1918
- Preceded by: Edward T. England
- Succeeded by: Charles A. Sinsel

Personal details
- Born: June 3, 1872 Newbern, Virginia, U.S.
- Died: March 2, 1944 (aged 71) Cincinnati, Ohio, U.S.
- Resting place: Williamson, West Virginia
- Party: Republican
- Spouse: Irene Hooper (m. 1898-1944, his death)
- Education: Washington and Lee University School of Law
- Profession: Attorney

Wells Goodykoontz (June 3, 1872 – March 2, 1944) was a Republican politician from the U.S. state of West Virginia who served in the West Virginia Legislature representing Mingo County. He was President of the West Virginia Senate from 1917 to 1919, and a Member of the U.S. House of Representatives from the now-defunct 5th congressional district of West Virginia. He served during the 66th and 67th United States Congresses.

Goodykoontz was born near Newbern, Virginia in Pulaski County on June 3, 1872. He was educated under private tutors and attended Oxford Academy at Floyd, Virginia and Washington and Lee University School of Law. He was admitted to the bar in 1893 and began practicing law at Williamson, West Virginia in 1894. He also worked in banking.

He served as a member of the West Virginia House of Delegates in 1911 and 1912. He then served as a member of the State Senate from 1914 to 1918. He was President of the Senate and Lieutenant Governor (ex officio) from 1917 until December 1, 1918.

He served as president of the West Virginia Bar Association in 1917 and 1918. He chaired the central legal advisory board for West Virginia during the First World War. In 1918, he won election as a Republican to the Sixty-sixth Congress and in 1920, won re-election to the Sixty-seventh Congress (March 4, 1919 – March 3, 1923). His candidacy for re-election in 1922 to the Sixty-eighth Congress was unsuccessful. He returned to his law practice and banking interests in Williamson as well as becoming a writer. He died in Cincinnati on March 2, 1944. He was buried at Fairview Cemetery in Williamson.

== Sources ==
- United States Congress. "Wells Goodykoontz (id: G000308)". Biographical Directory of the United States Congress.

Political offices
| Preceded by Edward T. England | President of the West Virginia Senate; 1917–1919 | Succeeded by Charles A. Sinsel |
U.S. House of Representatives
| Preceded by Edward Cooper | Member of the U.S. House of Representatives from West Virginia's 5th congressional district 1919–1923 | Succeeded by Thomas Jefferson Lilly |
