= George W. Johnson (West Virginia politician) =

American politician (1869–1944)

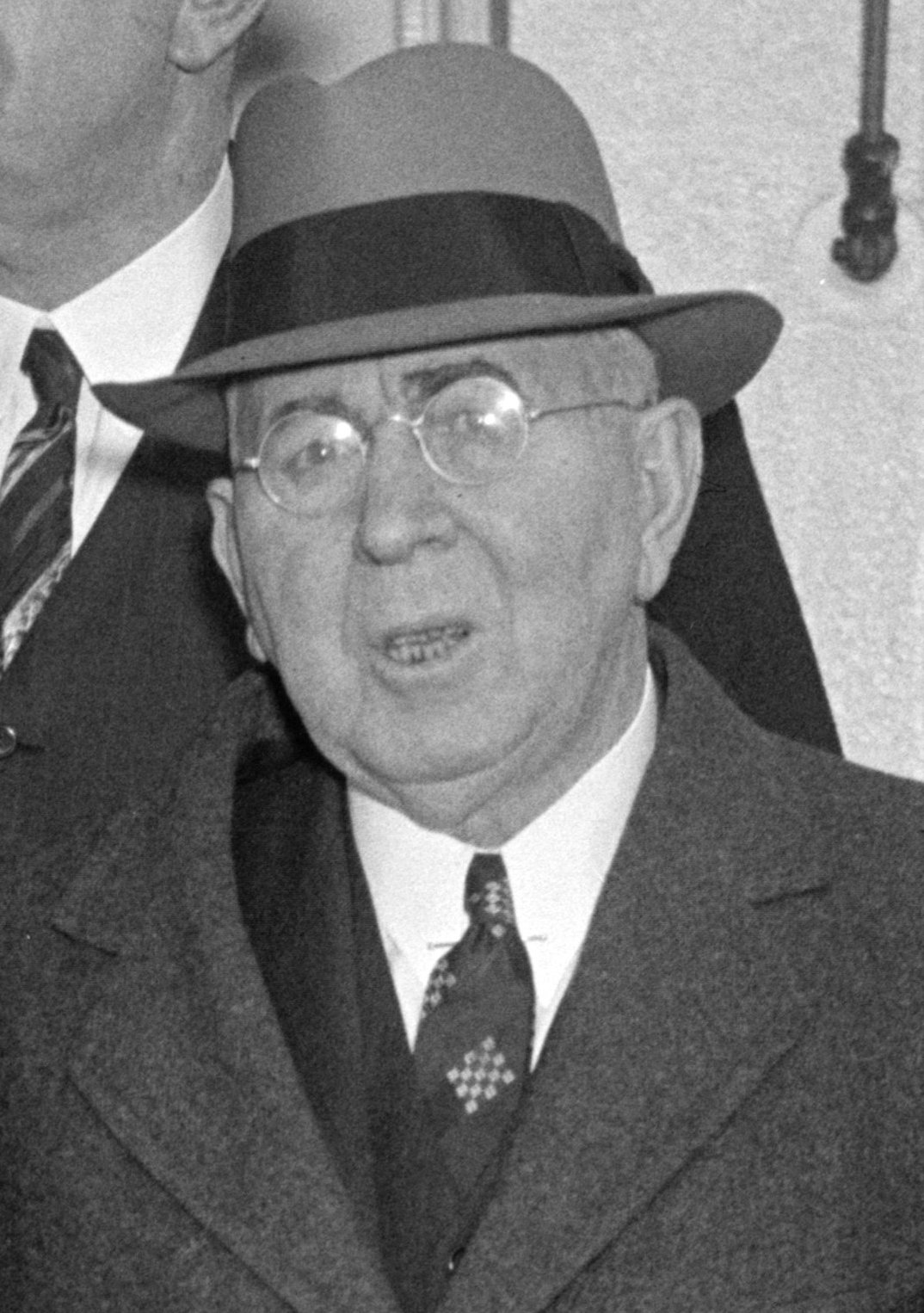

Member of the U.S. House of Representatives from West Virginia's 4th district
- In office March 4, 1923 – March 3, 1925
- Preceded by: Harry C. Woodyard
- Succeeded by: Harry C. Woodyard
- In office March 4, 1933 – January 3, 1943
- Preceded by: Robert L. Hogg
- Succeeded by: Hubert S. Ellis

Personal details
- Born: George William Johnson; November 10, 1869 Charles Town, West Virginia, USA
- Died: February 24, 1944 (aged 74) Martinsburg, West Virginia, USA
- Resting place: Edgehill Cemetery, Charles Town, West Virginia, USA
- Party: Democratic
- Education: West Virginia University
- Profession: Law

George William Johnson (November 10, 1869 – February 24, 1944) was a lawyer and Democratic politician who served as United States Representative from West Virginia from 1923 to 1925 and from 1933 to 1943.

== Early life ==
He was born near Charles Town, West Virginia, in Jefferson County on November 10, 1869. He attended the common schools and Shepherd University in Shepherdstown, West Virginia.

== Career ==
=== Law ===
Johnson graduated from West Virginia University at Morgantown in 1894 and from the law department of the same university in 1896. He was admitted to the bar and practiced law in Martinsburg. He served as city attorney of Martinsburg and then moved to Parkersburg in 1900, continuing to practice law.

Johnson served as a member of the board of regents of the State Normal School from 1897 to 1900. He served as Referee in Bankruptcy for the United States District Court of West Virginia and general counsel to the West Virginia Public Service Commission. During this time he also grew fruit and raised stock.

=== Congress ===
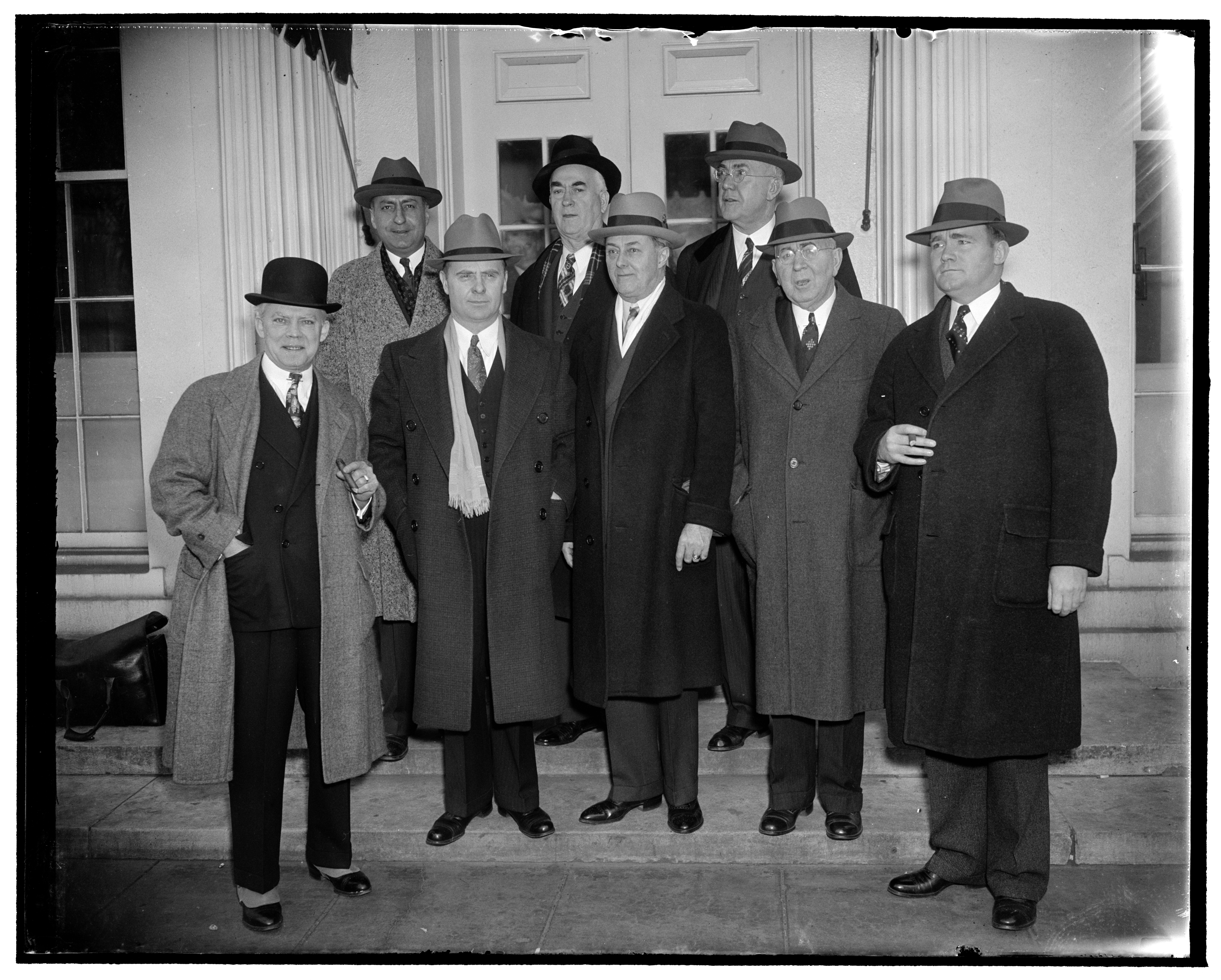
Group of legislators leaves White House after asking Franklin D. Roosevelt for $80,000,000 for flood control in Ohio Valley, March 7, 1938. front: l-r Joseph A. Dixon, James G. Polk, Eugene B. Crowe, G W Johnson, Lawrence E. Imhoff, rear l-r : Peter J. De Muth, Kent E. Keller, Brent Spence.

Johnson was elected in 1922 to the 68th Congress, only serving two years as his bid for re-election in 1924 was unsuccessful.

He was elected in 1932 to the 73rd Congress, and this time won re-election to the four succeeding Congresses. His re-election bid in 1942 was not successful.

== Death ==
He died in Martinsburg on February 24, 1944, and was buried in Edgehill Cemetery in Charles Town.

U.S. House of Representatives
Preceded by Harry C. Woodyard	Member of the U.S. House of Representatives from West Virginia's 4th congressional district 1923–1925	Succeeded by Harry C. Woodyard
Preceded by Robert Lynn Hogg	Member of the U.S. House of Representatives from West Virginia's 4th congressional district 1933–1943	Succeeded by Hubert S. Ellis
