= John M. Hamilton =

American politician (1855–1916)

John M. Hamilton (March 16, 1855 – December 27, 1916) was a Democratic Member of the U.S. House of Representatives for West Virginia's 4th district; he served in the 62nd United States Congress from 1911 to 1913.

== Biography ==
Hamilton was born in Weston, Virginia, on March 16, 1855. He graduated from the local schools and began to study law. In 1876 he became Weston's town recorder, and he served until 1877. Hamilton was admitted to the bar in 1877 and commenced practice in Grantsville, West Virginia. In 1881 and 1882 he was a committee clerk for the West Virginia Senate, and he was the Senate's assistant clerk from 1883 to 1887.

From 1887 to 1888, Hamilton was a member of the West Virginia House of Delegates, and he was the House clerk from 1888 to 1891. In addition to his law practice and political interests, Hamilton was also involved in banking and other business ventures, including serving as president of the Calhoun County Bank from 1901 to 1916.

In 1910, Hamilton was the successful Democratic nominee for a seat in the U.S. House; he served in the 62nd United States Congress (March 4, 1911 to March 3, 1913. He was an unsuccessful candidate for reelection in 1912, and for election in 1914. After leaving Congress, Hamilton resumed his legal and business pursuits, and served as president of the Calhoun County High School Board.

== Death and burial ==
Hamilton died in Grantsville on December 27, 1916; he was buried at Odd Fellows Cemetery in Bethlehem, West Virginia.

== Family ==
In 1885, Hamilton married Minnie Cook; They were the parents of 15 children:

- Lorentz C. Hamilton (1887-1954)
- Robert Linn Hamilton (1888-1943)
- William Hamilton (1890-1914)
- John Hamilton (1892-1972)
- Clifford Hamilton (1894-1895)
- George Hamilton (1894-1947)
- Edwin Hamilton (1896-1937)
- Victor Hamilton (1896-1918)
- Hope Hamilton Fetty (1898-1975)
- Minnie Hamilton (1900-1981)
- Mary Susan Hamilton Morgan (1904-1973)
- Richard Hamilton (1902-1903)
- Wilson Page Hamilton (1905-1994)
- Howard Hamilton (1908-1950)
- Grace Hamilton Long (1912-1962)

== Sources ==
=== Books ===
- Atkinson, George Wesley; Gibbens, Alvaro Franklin (1890). Prominent Men of West Virginia. Wheeling, WV: W. L. Callin. p. 683.
- Onofrio, Jan (1999). West Virginia Biographical Dictionary. St. Clair Shores, MI: Somerset Publishers, Inc. ISBN 9780403098446.

=== Internet ===
- Weaver, Bob (202). "The Hamiltons of Calhoun: Remembering "Boxcar"". The Hur Herald. Mt. Zion WV.

U.S. House of Representatives
Preceded by James A. Hughes	Member of the U.S. House of Representatives from West Virginia's 4th congressional district 1911–1913	Succeeded by Hunter Holmes Moss, Jr.
