= Robert L. Hogg =

American politician (1893–1973)

Robert Lynn Hogg (December 30, 1893 – July 21, 1973) was an American politician who represented West Virginia in the United States House of Representatives from 1930 to 1933. He was the son of Congressman Charles E. Hogg.

Hogg was born in Point Pleasant, West Virginia. He attended the public schools and West Virginia Preparatory School. He graduated from West Virginia University at Morgantown, West Virginia in 1914 and its law department in 1916. He was admitted to the bar in 1916 and commenced practice in Point Pleasant, West Virginia. During the First World War, he served from 1917 to 1919 in the Coast Artillery Corps and the Air Service. After the war, he resumed the practice of law in Point Pleasant, West Virginia.

Hogg was the prosecuting attorney of Mason County, West Virginia 1921–1924. He was also a member of the West Virginia Senate 1925–1929. He was elected as a Republican, in a special election, November 4, 1930, to the Seventy-first Congress to fill the vacancy caused by the death of James A. Hughes. He was reelected to the Seventy-second Congress and served from November 4, 1930, to March 3, 1933. He was an unsuccessful candidate for reelection in 1932 to the Seventy-third Congress.

After leaving Congress, Hogg resumed the practice of law in Point Pleasant, West Virginia. He was a lawyer for the Association of Life Insurance Presidents, New York City, 1935–1944 and executive and vice president of American Life Convention, Chicago, Illinois 1944–1954. In addition, he was the senior vice president, advisory counsel, and vice chairman of the board, Equitable Life Assurance Society of United States, from 1954 until retirement in 1960. He then continued to serve as a member of its board and executive committee. He was the counsel to a law firm in Charleston, West Virginia 1960-1970 and resided in Lewisburg, West Virginia. He was buried in Lone Oak Cemetery, Point Pleasant, West Virginia.

U.S. House of Representatives
Preceded by James A. Hughes	Member of the U.S. House of Representatives from West Virginia's 4th congressional district 1930–1933	Succeeded by George William Johnson
