= Charles E. Hogg =

American politician

Charles Edgar Hogg
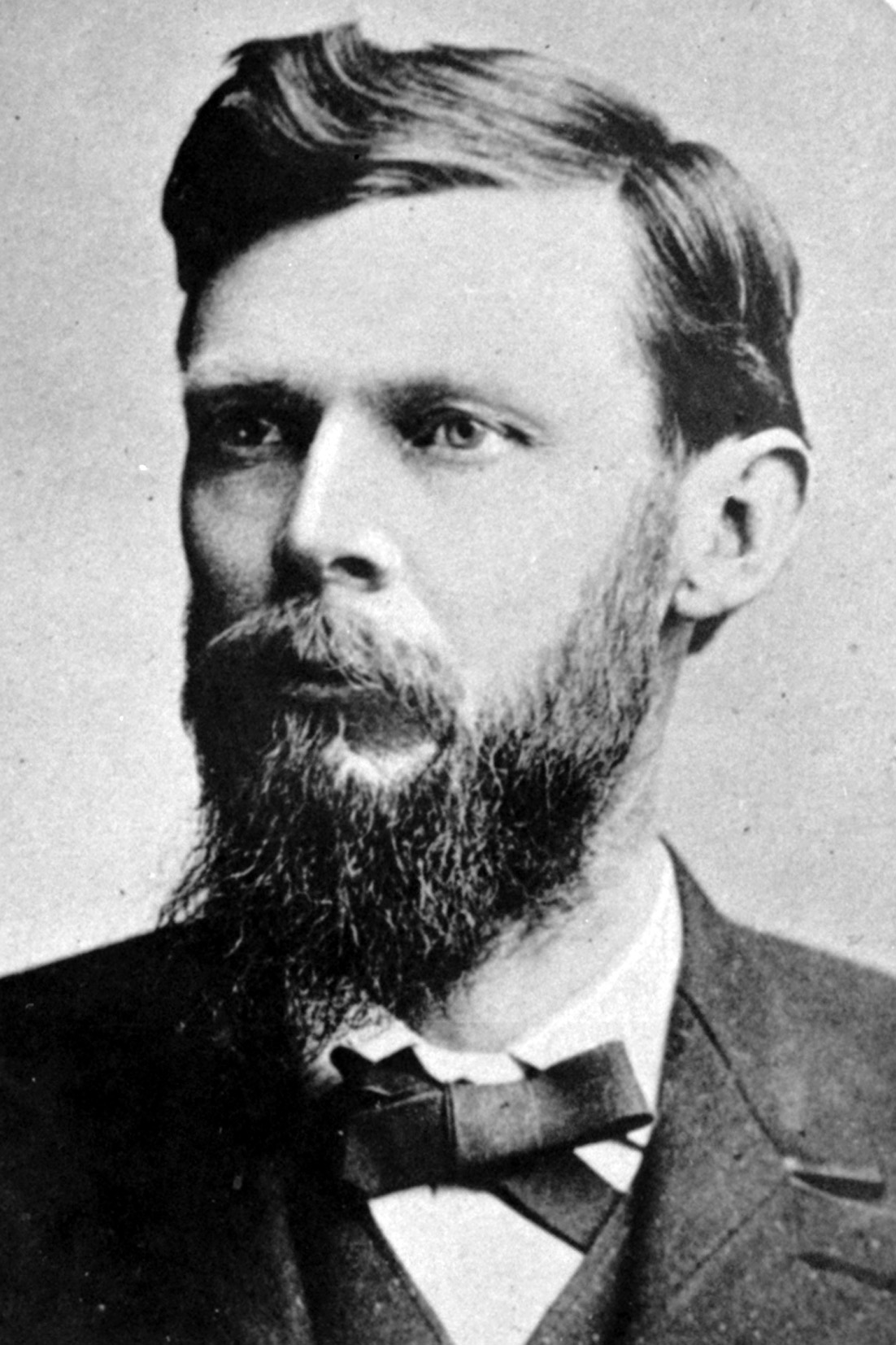
- from the Brady-Handy collection, Library of Congress

Member of the U.S. House of Representatives from West Virginia's 4th district
- In office March 4, 1887 – March 3, 1889

Personal details
- Born: December 21, 1852 Point Pleasant, Virginia (now West Virginia), US
- Died: June 14, 1935 (aged 82) Point Pleasant, West Virginia, US
- Party: Democrat; Republican
- Profession: Politician, educator, lawyer

Charles Edgar Hogg (December 21, 1852 – June 14, 1935) was a lawyer, educator and politician who represented West Virginia's 4th congressional district (1887–1889). Although initially a Democrat, later in life he became an author as well as a Progressive Republican and dean of the West Virginia University College of Law.

== Early life and education ==
Charles Hogg was born on a farm near Point Pleasant, Mason County, Virginia (now West Virginia) on December 21, 1852. He attended the new public schools at Locust Grove, then traveled west for studies at Carleton College in Racine, Ohio. Hogg graduated from Oldham & Hawe's Business College in Pomeroy, Ohio in 1869.

== Career ==
Hogg returned to Mason County, where he taught school and worked as a bookkeeper from 1870 to 1873. He also read law, possibly under Henry J. Fisher, whom he greatly admired, and who had one of the largest law libraries in the new state. Hogg was admitted to the bar in 1875 and entered practice in Point Pleasant, the county seat. In that same year, he also served as county superintendent of free schools of Mason County from 1875 to 1879.

Voters in the 4th Congressional district elected Hogg in 1886 to the 50th United States Congress (March 4, 1887 – March 3, 1889), where he served as Congress's youngest member. He failed to win his party's renomination to that seat and returned to his law practice in Point Pleasant. In 1900, he affiliated with the Republican Party. He served as a dean of the College of Law of West Virginia University at Morgantown from 1906 to 1913. He authored several works on legal procedure.

== Death and legacy ==
Charles E. Hogg died in Point Pleasant, West Virginia on June 14, 1935, and was buried in Lone Oak Cemetery. His son Robert Lynn Hogg also became a congressman.

== Sources ==
- United States Congress. "Charles E. Hogg (id: H000701)". Biographical Directory of the United States Congress.

U.S. House of Representatives
Preceded by Eustace Gibson	Member of the U.S. House of Representatives from West Virginia's 4th congressional district 1887–1889	Succeeded by James M. Jackson
