= Maurice G. Burnside =

American politician

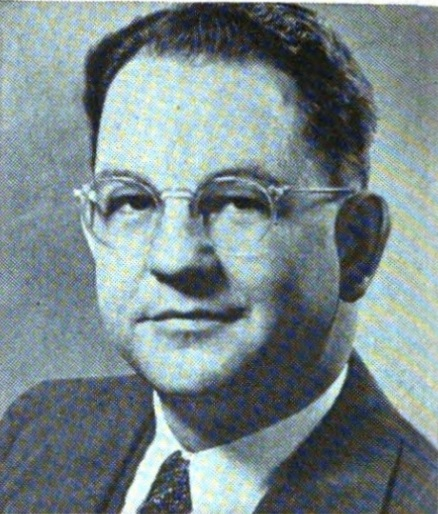

Member of the U.S. House of Representatives from West Virginia's 4th district
- In office January 3, 1955 – January 3, 1957
- Preceded by: Will E. Neal
- Succeeded by: Will E. Neal
- In office January 3, 1949 – January 3, 1953
- Preceded by: Hubert S. Ellis
- Succeeded by: Will E. Neal

Personal details
- Born: August 23, 1902 Columbia, South Carolina
- Died: February 2, 1991 (aged 88) Wilson, North Carolina
- Party: Democratic
- Education: Furman University; University of Texas; Duke University
- Occupation: educator

Maurice Gwinn Burnside (August 23, 1902 – February 2, 1991) was a professor, tobacco warehouse manager, and U.S. representative from Huntington, West Virginia.

Burnside was born near Columbia, Richland County, South Carolina in 1902. He attended the public schools of South Carolina and attended The Citadel, Charleston, South Carolina from 1920 to 1922. Burnside graduated from Furman University, Greenville, South Carolina in 1926, received his M.A. from the University of Texas, Austin, Texas in 1928 and his Ph.D. from Duke University, Durham, North Carolina in 1937. Burnside was an instructor for Greenville High School, Greenville, South Carolina from 1931 to 1932. He was a member of the staff of Duke University Library, Durham, North Carolina from 1933 to 1935. He was an instructor at the Alabama Polytechnic Institute (Auburn University), Auburn, Alabama from 1936 to 1937. Burnside was professor at Marshall University, Huntington, West Virginia from 1937 to 1948. He was a member of the Parole and Probation Examination Board of West Virginia from 1939 to 1941 and chairman of Workers Education for West Virginia from 1942 to 1945.

Burnside was elected as a Democrat to the Eighty-first and Eighty-second Congresses (January 3, 1949 – January 3, 1953) and an unsuccessful candidate for reelection to the Eighty-third Congress in 1952. He was branch chief of the National Security Agency, Washington, D.C. in 1953. Burnside was elected to the Eighty-fourth Congress (January 3, 1955 – January 3, 1957) and an unsuccessful candidate for election to the Eighty-fifth Congress in 1956. Burnside did not sign the 1956 Southern Manifesto. He became a business executive and public advocate. He was a delegate to the 1960 Democratic National Convention and legislative liaison to the Department of Defense from 1961 to 1968. Burnside was an avid gardener and duplicate bridge player. He died in Wilson, North Carolina in 1991 and his remains were cremated. He has a gravestone in Pilot Mountain, NC.

U.S. House of Representatives
| Preceded by Hubert S. Ellis | Member of the U.S. House of Representatives from West Virginia's 4th congressional district 1949–1953 | Succeeded by Will E. Neal |
| Preceded by Will E. Neal | Member of the U.S. House of Representatives from West Virginia's 4th congressional district 1955–1957 | Succeeded by Will E. Neal |
