= Robert L. Ramsay (politician) =

American politician (1877–1956)

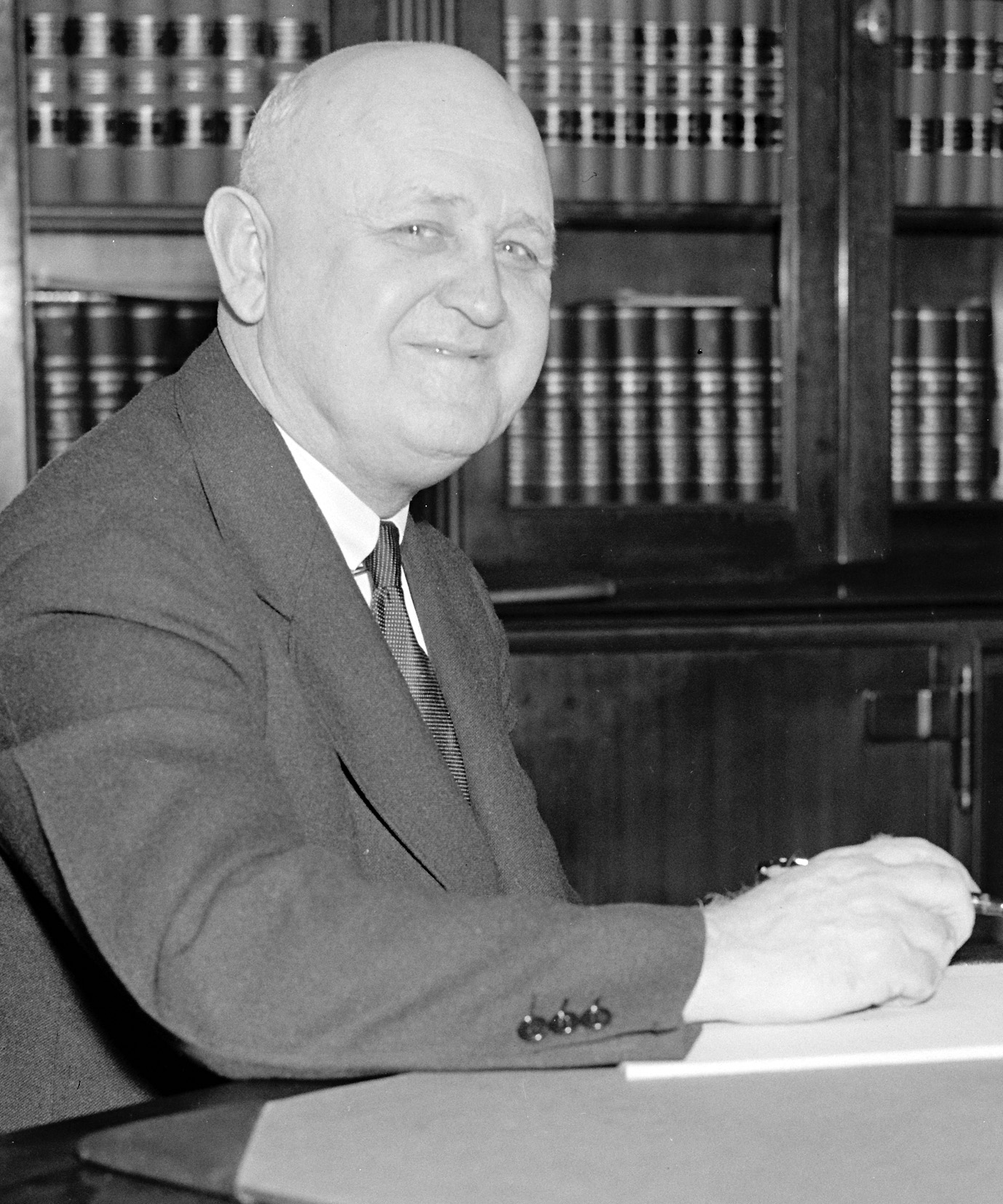

Member of the U.S. House of Representatives from West Virginia's 1st district
- In office January 3, 1949 – January 3, 1953
- Preceded by: Francis J. Love
- Succeeded by: Bob Mollohan
- In office January 3, 1941 – January 3, 1943
- Preceded by: A. C. Schiffler
- Succeeded by: A. C. Schiffler
- In office March 4, 1933 – January 3, 1939
- Preceded by: Carl G. Bachmann
- Succeeded by: A. C. Schiffler

Personal details
- Born: March 24, 1877 Witton Gilbert, County Durham, England, United Kingdom
- Died: November 14, 1956 (aged 79) Wheeling, West Virginia, U.S.
- Party: Democratic
- Education: West Virginia University (LLB)

Robert Lincoln Ramsay (March 24, 1877 – November 14, 1956) was an English-born American politician who served as a member of the United States House of Representatives for West Virginia's 1st congressional district from 1933 to 1939, 1941 to 1943, and 1949 to 1953.

== Early life and education ==
The son of a coal miner, Robert Ramsay was born in Witton Gilbert, County Durham, England. Ramsay immigrated to the United States in 1881 with his parents, who settled in New Cumberland, Hancock County, West Virginia. He attended local public schools and graduated from the West Virginia University College of Law in 1901.

== Career ==
In 1901 Ramsay was admitted to the bar and commenced practice in New Cumberland. In 1905, he moved to Wellsburg, Brooke County, West Virginia and continued the practice of law. In 1905 he became the city attorney of Follansbee, Brooke County, West Virginia, serving until 1920. Ramsay served as two terms as prosecuting attorney of Brooke County, 1908–1912 and 1916-1920. Ramsay became a member of the board of governors for West Virginia University from 1927 until 1930.

Robert Ramsay was elected from West Virginia's 1st District as a Democrat to the Seventy-third, Seventy-fourth, and Seventy-fifth Congresses, serving from March 4, 1933 until January 3, 1939. The 1938 elections proved to be unsuccessful for Ramsay, as he was defeated by A. C. Schiffler for reelection to the Seventy-sixth Congress. He resumed the practice of law in Wellsburg, West Virginia. He was re-elected to the Seventy-seventh Congress, serving from January 3, 1941 until January 3, 1943. Poor results followed Ramsay into the 1942 elections, as he was once again defeated for re-election by A. C. Schiffler to the Seventy-eighth Congress.

Ramsay served as a special assistant to the United States attorney general from 1943 to 1945. Then he served as assistant attorney general of West Virginia 1945-1948. Ramsay was re-elected to the Eighty-first and Eighty-second Congresses, serving from January 3, 1949 until January 3, 1953. He was an unsuccessful candidate for renomination in 1952 and then resumed the practice of law and was assistant prosecuting attorney from 1952 to 1956.

== Death ==
Ramsay died in Wheeling, West Virginia, on November 14, 1956, and was interred in Oak Grove Cemetery in Follansbee, West Virginia.

== See also ==
- List of United States representatives from West Virginia

Party political offices
Preceded by Fleming N. Alderson	Democratic nominee for West Virginia Attorney General; 1928	Succeeded by Homer A. Holt
U.S. House of Representatives
Preceded by Carl G. Bachmann	Member of the U.S. House of Representatives from West Virginia's 1st congressional district 1933–1939	Succeeded by A. C. Schiffler
Preceded by A. C. Schiffler	Member of the U.S. House of Representatives from West Virginia's 1st congressional district 1941–1943	Succeeded by A. C. Schiffler
Preceded by Francis J. Love	Member of the U.S. House of Representatives from West Virginia's 1st congressional district 1949–1953	Succeeded by Robert H. Mollohan
