= Thomas B. Davis =

American politician (1828–1911)

Thomas Davis
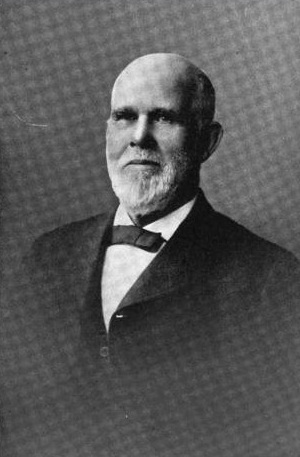

Member of the U.S. House of Representatives from West Virginia's 2nd district
- In office June 6, 1905 – March 3, 1907
- Preceded by: Alston G. Dayton
- Succeeded by: George Cookman Sturgiss

Member of the West Virginia House of Delegates from the Mineral County district
- In office 1899–1900

Personal details
- Born: Thomas Beall Davis; April 25, 1828 Baltimore, Maryland, U.S.
- Died: November 26, 1911 (aged 83) Keyser, West Virginia, U.S.
- Resting place: Maplewood Cemetery in Elkins, West Virginia
- Party: Democratic
- Relations: Henry Gassaway Davis (brother)
- Occupation: Politician
- Committees: West Virginia Democratic State Executive Committee

Thomas Beall Davis (April 25, 1828 – November 26, 1911), of Keyser, West Virginia, was an American Democratic politician.

== Biography ==
Davis was born in Baltimore, Maryland, and was the brother of Henry Gassaway Davis. He relocated to Howard County, Maryland, where he attended public schools. Davis moved to Piedmont in present-day West Virginia in 1854 and began working for the Baltimore and Ohio Railroad. He then relocated to Keyser, West Virginia, several years later, and he engaged in the mercantile, lumbering, banking, mining, and railroad building businesses.

In 1876 Davis became a Member of West Virginia Democratic State Executive Committee, serving until 1907. He entered the West Virginia House of Delegates in 1899, representing Mineral County until 1900.

Davis became a U.S. Representative from West Virginia's 2nd District in the 59th Congress, serving from 1905 to 1907 after the resignation of Republican Alston Dayton.

He died in Keyser and was buried at Maplewood Cemetery in Elkins. The town of Thomas, West Virginia is named for him.

U.S. House of Representatives
Preceded by Alston G. Dayton	Member of the U.S. House of Representatives from West Virginia's 1st congressional district 1905–1907	Succeeded by George Cookman Sturgiss
