= West Virginia's 4th congressional district =

1883–1993 US congressional district

- Obsolete district
- Created: 1880
- Eliminated: 1990
- Years active: 1883-1993

West Virginia's 4th congressional district is an obsolete district existing from 1883 to 1993. While the district's bounds were changed many times over the years, from the 1940 redistricting to the 1970 redistricting, the district was focused on Huntington and the industrial mill towns north of that city. In the 1970 redistricting, the district focused on Huntington and the rural coal producing areas of southwestern West Virginia.

== History ==
The 4th district was formed in 1882. It originally consisted of Pleasants, Wood, Ritchie, Wirt, Calhoun, Jackson, Roane, Mason, Putnam, Cabell, Lincoln and Wayne counties. In 1902, Tyler Braxton, Gilmer, and Doddridge were added, while Putnam, Cabell, Lincoln and Wayne were removed. The district was totally reconstituted in 1916 as Tyler, Pleasants, Wood, Wirt, Jackson, Roane, Mason, Putnam, and Cabell counties. In 1934, Wayne and Lincoln were added. The district was unchanged for 1952. In 1962, Logan was added. In 1972, the district was totally reconstituted as Cabell, Logan, McDowell, Mercer, Mingo, Raleigh, Wayne and Wyoming counties. The district was abolished in the 1992 redistricting. The district was subsumed by the 3rd district's new boundaries; today, the 1973-1993 area of the 4th district is within the state's 1st district.

== List of representatives ==
Representative	Party	Dates	Cong ress	Electoral history
District established March 4, 1883
Eustace Gibson (Huntington)	Democratic	March 4, 1883 – March 3, 1887	48th 49th	Elected in 1882. Re-elected in 1884. Lost renomination.
Charles E. Hogg (Point Pleasant)	Democratic	March 4, 1887 – March 3, 1889	50th	Elected in 1886. Lost renomination.
James M. Jackson (Parkersburg)	Democratic	March 4, 1889 – February 3, 1890	51st	Elected in 1888. Lost contested election.
Charles B. Smith (Parkersburg)	Republican	February 3, 1890 – March 3, 1891	51st	Won contested election. Lost re-election.
James Capehart (Point Pleasant)	Democratic	March 4, 1891 – March 3, 1895	52nd 53rd	Elected in 1890. Re-elected in 1892. Retired.
Warren Miller (Ripley)	Republican	March 4, 1895 – March 3, 1899	54th 55th	Elected in 1894. Re-elected in 1896. Retired.
Romeo H. Freer (Harrisville)	Republican	March 4, 1899 – March 3, 1901	56th	Elected in 1898. Retired to run for Attorney General of West Virginia.
James A. Hughes (Huntington)	Republican	March 4, 1901 – March 3, 1903	57th	Elected in 1900. Redistricted to the 5th district.
Harry C. Woodyard (Spencer)	Republican	March 4, 1903 – March 3, 1911	58th 59th 60th 61st	Elected in 1902. Re-elected in 1904. Re-elected in 1906. Re-elected in 1908. Lost re-election.
John M. Hamilton (Grantsville)	Democratic	March 4, 1911 – March 3, 1913	62nd	Elected in 1910. Lost re-election.
Hunter H. Moss Jr. (Parkersburg)	Republican	March 4, 1913 – July 15, 1916	63rd 64th	Elected in 1912. Re-elected in 1914. Died.
Vacant		July 15, 1916 – November 7, 1916	64th	
Harry C. Woodyard (Spencer)	Republican	November 7, 1916 – March 3, 1923	64th 65th 66th 67th	Elected to finish Moss's term. Also elected to the next full term. Re-elected in 1918. Re-elected in 1920. Lost re-election.
George W. Johnson (Parkersburg)	Democratic	March 4, 1923 – March 3, 1925	68th	Elected in 1922. Lost re-election.
Harry C. Woodyard (Spencer)	Republican	March 4, 1925 – March 3, 1927	69th	Elected in 1924. Retired.
James A. Hughes (Huntington)	Republican	March 4, 1927 – March 2, 1930	70th 71st	Elected in 1926. Re-elected in 1928. Died.
Vacant		March 2, 1930 – November 4, 1930	71st	
Robert L. Hogg (Point Pleasant)	Republican	November 4, 1930 – March 3, 1933	71st 72nd	Elected to finish Hughes's term. Also elected to the next full term. Lost re-election.
George W. Johnson (Parkersburg)	Democratic	March 4, 1933 – January 3, 1943	73rd 74th 75th 76th 77th	Elected in 1932. Re-elected in 1934. Re-elected in 1936. Re-elected in 1938. Re-elected in 1940. Lost re-election.
Hubert S. Ellis (Huntington)	Republican	January 3, 1943 – January 3, 1949	78th 79th 80th	Elected in 1942. Re-elected in 1944. Re-elected in 1946. Lost re-election.
Maurice G. Burnside (Huntington)	Democratic	January 3, 1949 – January 3, 1953	81st 82nd	Elected in 1948. Re-elected in 1950. Lost re-election.
Will E. Neal (Huntington)	Republican	January 3, 1953 – January 3, 1955	83rd	Elected in 1952. Lost re-election.
Maurice G. Burnside (Huntington)	Democratic	January 3, 1955 – January 3, 1957	84th	Elected in 1954. Lost re-election.
Will E. Neal (Huntington)	Republican	January 3, 1957 – January 3, 1959	85th	Elected in 1956. Lost re-election.
Ken Hechler (Huntington)	Democratic	January 3, 1959 – January 3, 1977	86th 87th 88th 89th 90th 91st 92nd 93rd 94th	Elected in 1958. Re-elected in 1960. Re-elected in 1962. Re-elected in 1964. Re-elected in 1966. Re-elected in 1968. Re-elected in 1970. Re-elected in 1972. Re-elected in 1974. Retired to run for governor.
Nick Rahall (Beckley)	Democratic	January 3, 1977 – January 3, 1993	95th 96th 97th 98th 99th 100th 101st 102nd	Elected in 1976. Re-elected in 1978. Re-elected in 1980. Re-elected in 1982. Re-elected in 1984. Re-elected in 1986. Re-elected in 1988. Re-elected in 1990. Redistricted to the 3rd district.
District dissolved January 3, 1993
