= James A. Hughes =

American politician (1861–1930)

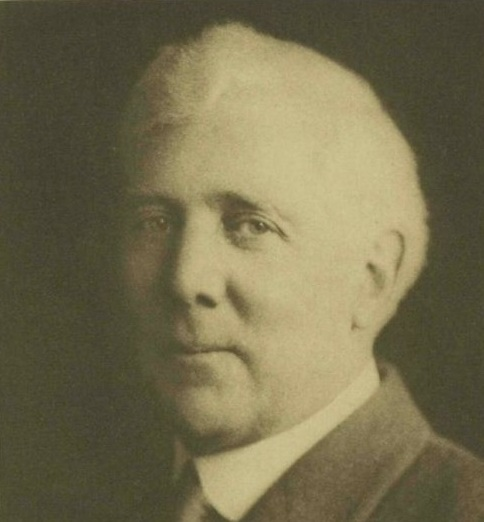
- Frontispiece of 1930's James A. Hughes, Late a Representative

Member of the U.S. House of Representatives from West Virginia
- In office March 4, 1927 – March 2, 1930
- Preceded by: Harry C. Woodyard
- Succeeded by: Robert Lynn Hogg
- Constituency: 4th district
- In office March 4, 1901 – March 3, 1915
- Preceded by: Romeo H. Freer
- Succeeded by: Edward Cooper
- Constituency: 4th district (1901–1903); 5th district (1903–1915)

Member of the West Virginia Senate from the 6th district
- In office December 1, 1894 – February 1898
- Preceded by: James H. Marcum
- Succeeded by: James H. Marcum

Personal details
- Born: James Anthony Hughes; February 27, 1861 near Corunna, Province of Canada
- Died: March 2, 1930 (aged 69) Marion, Ohio, U.S.
- Party: Republican
- Spouse: Ida Belle Vinson (m. 1885)
- Children: 2, including Eloise

James Anthony Hughes (February 27, 1861 – March 2, 1930) was a member of the United States House of Representatives from the state of West Virginia.

Hughes was born near Corunna in the Province of Canada (in what is now Ontario). He immigrated to the United States as a youth, graduating from business school in Pittsburgh, Pennsylvania in 1875. He worked as a bank messenger, travelling salesman, and a businessman before being elected to the Kentucky House of Representatives in 1888, serving a two-year term. He was a member of the West Virginia Senate from 1894 to 1898. In 1896, Hughes was appointed postmaster of Huntington, West Virginia. He was a delegate to every Republican National Convention from 1892 to 1924.

In 1900, Hughes was elected as a Republican to the U.S. House of Representatives in the 4th congressional district. After his first term, he represented West Virginia's 5th, and was elected six additional times before choosing not to run again in 1914. During his time as a Representative, he served as chair of the Committee on Expenditures on Public Buildings and as chair of the Committee on Accounts. After eleven years of retirement he was re-elected to the House in 1926 for the 4th congressional district. He served two terms before dying in office on March 2, 1930, in Marion, Ohio. He was interred in Spring Hill Cemetery in Huntington.

Hughes was, through his marriage to Belle Vinson, a member of the Vinson political family. His daughter, Eloise Hughes Smith, was among the survivors of the RMS Titanic disaster. Her husband, Lucian P. Smith, died in the sinking. She later married another Titanic survivor, Robert Daniel.

== See also ==
- List of members of the United States Congress who died in office (1900–1949)

U.S. House of Representatives
Preceded by Romeo H. Freer	Member of the U.S. House of Representatives from West Virginia's 4th congressional district 1901–1903	Succeeded by Harry C. Woodyard
Preceded by None	Member of the U.S. House of Representatives from West Virginia's 5th congressional district 1903–1915	Succeeded by Edward Cooper
Preceded by Harry C. Woodyard	Member of the U.S. House of Representatives from West Virginia's 4th congressional district 1927–1930	Succeeded by Robert Lynn Hogg
