= Daniel Polsley =

American politician (1803–1877)

Daniel Haymond Polsley
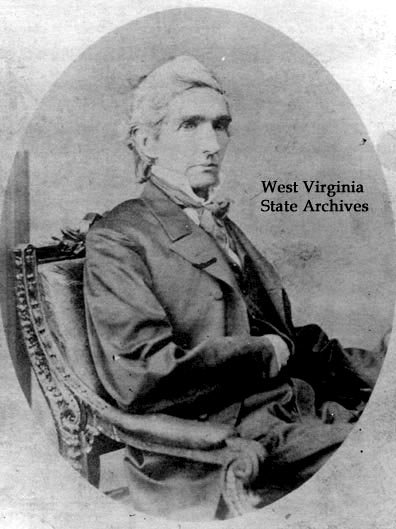

Member of the U.S. House of Representatives from West Virginia's 3rd district
- In office March 4, 1867 – March 3, 1869
- Preceded by: Kellian Whaley
- Succeeded by: John Witcher

Personal details
- Born: November 28, 1803 Fairmont, Virginia, U.S. (now West Virginia)
- Died: October 14, 1877 (aged 73) Point Pleasant, West Virginia, U.S.
- Party: Republican
- Profession: Politician, Lawyer, Judge, Editor

Daniel Haymond Polsley (November 28, 1803 – October 14, 1877) was a nineteenth-century lawyer, judge, editor and politician who helped form the State of West Virginia and served one term in the U.S. House of Representatives.

== Early and family life ==
Born in Palatine near Fairmont, Virginia (now West Virginia) to the former Margaret Haymond (1769–1830) and her husband Jacob Polsley (1763–1823). His Maryland-born maternal grandfather William Haymond (1740–1821) had moved to the Appalachian area and fought the Native Americans, and in 1777 had commanded Pickett's fort on the Monongahela River; his uncle William C. Haymond would represent Randolph County in the Virginia General Assembly session of 1836–7. His father had served as a private in the Berks County, Pennsylvania militia during the American Revolutionary War before moving across the Appalachians. Polsley had one elder brother, John Haymond Polsley (1793–1879) who survived to adulthood and moved to first Indiana then Iowa (and two of whose sons died fighting for the Union during the American Civil War). The Polsley family also included three elder sisters and two younger sisters who survived to marry—Elizabeth P. Polsley Newbrough (1795–1875), Rowena Polsley Graham (1798–1845), Maria Polsley Billings (1800–1829), Amanda Polsley Hughes (1810–1876) and Paulina Olive Polsley Hall (1813–1852). Daniel Polsley attended country schools as a child, completed preparatory studies and read law.

Daniel Polsley married Eliza Villette Brown (1806–1879) on August 14, 1827, in Wellsburg. Her grandfather, Oliver Brown (1753–1846), had likewise fought in the American Revolution, but on the Massachusetts line before moving to the Virginia mountains. The couple had many children, but several died young. Those surviving to adulthood included John Jacob Polsley (1831–1866), Daniel Willey Polsley (1842–1888) and Edgar Athling Polsley (1847–1925) Some sources show the couple had 12 children.

== Career ==
Admitted to the bar in 1827, Polsley began his legal career in Wellsburg, Virginia (now West Virginia), the county seat of Brooke County, Virginia and on the Ohio River near Steubenville, Ohio. Polsley also edited the Western Transcript from 1833 to 1845. He then moved westward (or downstream on the Ohio River) to Mason County, Virginia (now West Virginia) in 1845, where he farmed as well as practiced law. He owned a slave in the 1840 Census, a black woman and a 3 year old mulatto boy in the 1850 census, and a 40 year old black woman, 17 and 4 year old mulatto boys, and an 8 year old black boy and a 6 year old black girl in 1860.

Polsley, Lewis Wetzel and Charles B. Waggonner represented Mason County at the Wheeling Convention in May 1861. In the General Assembly Sessions at Wheeling in July 1861, December 1861-February 1862, May 1862 and December 1862-February 1863, fellow delegates elected Polsley president of the nascent state's senate. He later that year became Lieutenant Governor of the Restored government of Virginia. He opposed the creation of a new state from the western counties of Virginia at a time when most of the electorate was unable to vote. On August 16, 1861, at the Wheeling convention, he said "If they proceeded now to direct a division of the State before a free expression of the people could be had, they would do a more despotic act than any ever done by the Richmond Convention itself."

Meanwhile, his sons John Jacob Polsley and Daniel Willey Polsley had volunteered to fight for the Union, J.J. Polsley was the lieutenant Colonel of the 7th West Virginia Cavalry, and his brother enlisted as a private but rose to the rank of lieutenant. About two weeks before West Virginia became a separate state, Daniel Polsley resigned his legislative position (on June 8, 1863), in order to succeed James H. Brown as judge of the seventh judicial circuit of West Virginia, a position he held from 1863 to 1866. In the latter year James W. Hoge succeeded Judge Polsley, who resigned after being elected to Congress.

In the 1866 elections, voters of West Virginia's 3rd congressional district elected Polsley as a Republican to the United States House of Representatives, and he served from 1867 to 1869. Afterwards, fellow Republican John Witcher succeeded to the Congressional seat for one term before being replaced by a Democrat, and Polsley resumed his legal practice in Point Pleasant.

== Death and legacy ==
Polsley died on October 14, 1877. He was interred there in Lone Oak Cemetery in Mason County. Other family members are in what became Maple Grove Cemetery in Fairmont.

== See also ==
- West Virginia's congressional delegations

Political offices
Preceded by (none)	Lieutenant Governor of the Restored Government of Virginia; 1861–1863	Succeeded by Leopold C. P. Cowper
U.S. House of Representatives
Preceded by Kellian Whaley	Member of the U.S. House of Representatives from West Virginia's 3rd congressional district March 4, 1867 – March 3, 1869	Succeeded by John Witcher
