= John Witcher =

American politician (1839–1906)

John Seashoal Witcher
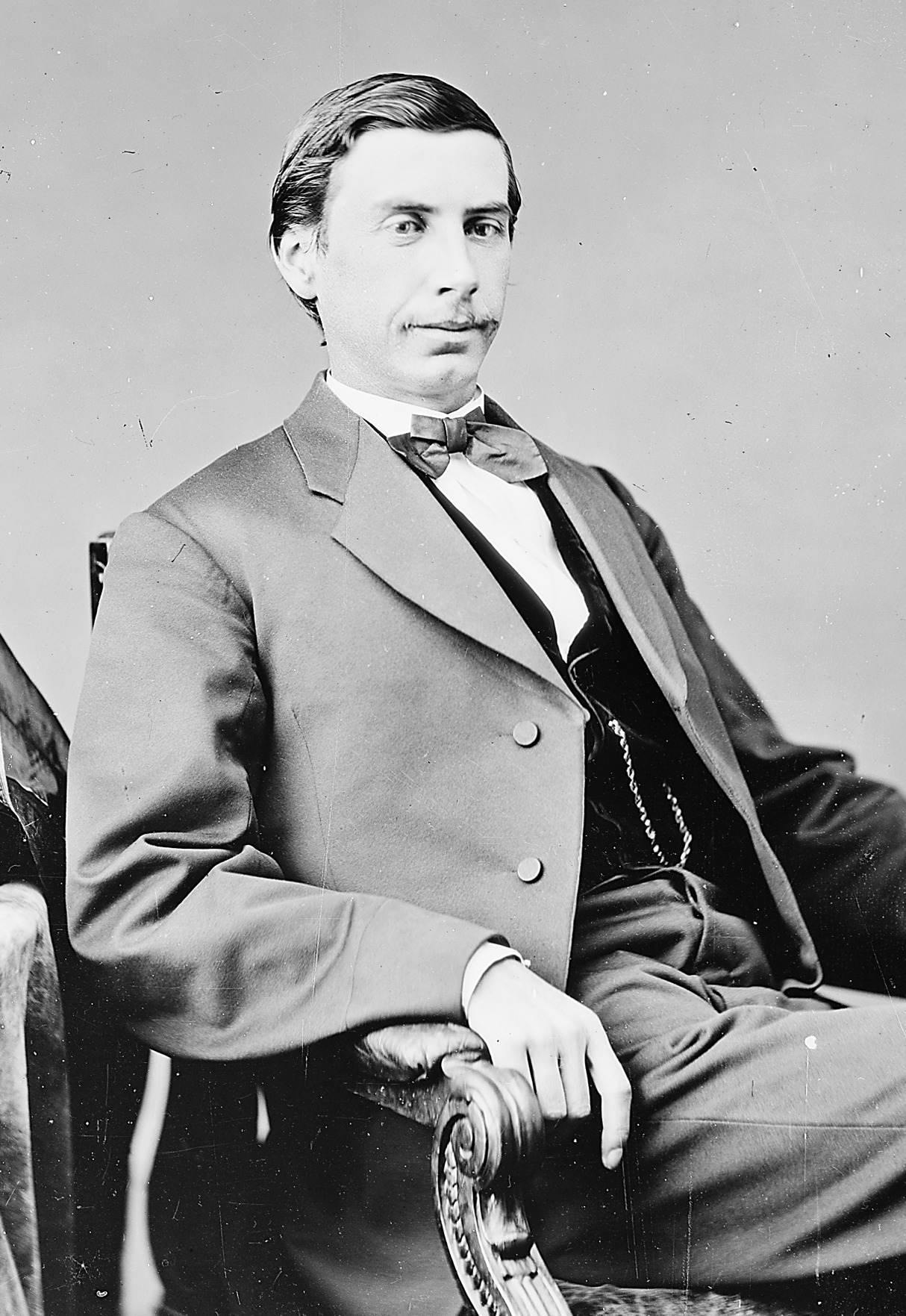

Member of the U.S. House of Representatives from West Virginia's 3rd district
- In office March 4, 1869 – March 3, 1871
- Preceded by: Daniel Polsley
- Succeeded by: Frank Hereford

3rd Secretary of State of West Virginia
- In office 1867–1869
- Governor: William E. Stevenson
- Preceded by: Granville D. Hall
- Succeeded by: James M. Pipes

Personal details
- Born: July 15, 1839 Cabell County, Virginia, United States (now West Virginia)
- Died: July 8, 1906 (aged 66) Salt Lake City, Utah, United States
- Party: Republican
- Spouse: Mahaley Witcher
- Profession: Politician, Soldier

Military service
- Allegiance: United States
- Branch/service: Union Army; United States Army
- Years of service: 1861–1865; 1880–1899
- Rank: Lieutenant Colonel; Brevet Brigadier General
- Unit: 3rd West Virginia Volunteer Cavalry Regiment
- Battles/wars: American Civil War

John Seashoal Witcher (July 15, 1839 – July 8, 1906) was an American farmer, politician and soldier from Cabell County, West Virginia (then in Virginia), who helped found the new Union state during the American Civil War and served one term in Congress representing West Virginia's 3rd congressional district as a Republican. After losing his re-election in 1870 he resumed his federal and U.S. Army career. In addition to serving as lieutenant colonel and brevet colonel of the 3rd West Virginia Volunteer Cavalry, Witcher also served a member of the West Virginia House of Delegates and as the 3rd Secretary of State of West Virginia. On March 18, 1867, President Andrew Johnson nominated Witcher for appointment to the brevet grade of brigadier general, to rank from March 13, 1865; and the United States Senate confirmed the appointment on March 28, 1867. He is sometimes confused with his first cousin, Confederate Col. Vincent A. "Clawhammer" Witcher, a lawyer who lived in nearby Wayne County and who commanded the 34th Virginia Cavalry Battalion.

== Early and family life ==
Born in Cabell County, Virginia (now West Virginia) to farmer Jeremiah Witcher and his wife Polly, John Witcher was his family's only son, having an elder sister Emily (b. 1838) and younger sisters America (b. 1844) and Valeria (b. 1846). The family also included his paternal grandmother Sarah until some time before 1860. John attended the local private schools as a child, as well as helped on the family farm.

He married Mahaley F. Witcher, four years his junior, and they had a daughter Valera in 1862 and sons William V Witcher (b. 1863), P. Sheridan Witcher (b. 1865) and John T. Witcher (b. 1867).

== Career ==
John Witcher, who listed himself as a farmer on the 1860 census (when the household also included a 25 year old day laborer), was elected clerk of the circuit court of Cabell County in 1861.

On December 13, 1862, Witcher enlisted in the Union Army as a first lieutenant in the 3rd West Virginia Volunteer Cavalry Regiment. He was promoted to captain on September 8, 1863, major on May 23, 1864, and lieutenant colonel on May 6, 1865, before being honorably mustered out on June 30, 1865.

After the war's end, Cabell County voters elected Witcher to represent them in the West Virginia House of Delegates. He also served as West Virginia's 3rd Secretary of State. On March 18, 1867, President Andrew Johnson nominated Witcher for appointment to the grade of brevet brigadier general, to rank from March 13, 1865, and the United States Senate confirmed the appointment on March 28, 1867.

Witcher was a member of the West Virginia House of Delegates in 1865, was Secretary of State of West Virginia from 1867 to 1869 and was elected a Republican to the United States House of Representatives in 1868, serving from 1869 to 1871. After being unsuccessful for reelection in 1870, he was appointed collector of internal revenue for the third district of West Virginia by President Ulysses S. Grant, serving from 1871 to 1876. Witcher served as United States pension agent in Washington, D.C. from 1878 to 1880 and was major and paymaster of the United States Army from 1880 until his retirement in 1899. He was promoted to lieutenant colonel on the retired list on April 23, 1904.

== Death and legacy ==
He moved to Salt Lake City, Utah in 1891 where he died on July 8, 1906. He is interred in Arlington National Cemetery.

== See also ==
- List of American Civil War brevet generals (Union)

Political offices
Preceded by Granville D. Hall	Secretary of State of West Virginia; 1867 – 1869	Succeeded by James M. Pipes
U.S. House of Representatives
Preceded by Daniel Polsley	Member of the U.S. House of Representatives from West Virginia's 3rd congressional district March 4, 1869 – March 3, 1871	Succeeded by Frank Hereford
