= Leopold Copeland Parker Cowper =

American politician

Lieutenant governor of Virginia
- In office November 1863 – September 1869

Member of the Virginia Senate

Member of the Virginia House of Delegates from the Norfolk County, Virginia district
- In office December 6, 1847 – December 3, 1849 Serving with George D. Happer, Thomas B. Butt
- Preceded by: Samuel Watts
- Succeeded by: George D. Happer

Personal details
- Born: March 1811 Macclesfield Estate, Isle of Wight County, Virginia
- Died: July 17, 1875 (aged 64)
- Resting place: Josiah Parker Family Cemetery
- Party: Whig
- Relations: Josiah Parker (grandfather)

Leopold Copeland Parker Cowper (March 1811 – July 17, 1875) was an American lawyer who served as (seventh) lieutenant governor of the Restored government of Virginia from November 1863 until June 1865 and then as the eighth Lieutenant Governor of the Commonwealth of Virginia from June 1865 until September 1869 under Governors John Letcher, William Smith, Francis Harrison Pierpont and Henry H. Wells. Earlier in his political career he served in the Virginia House of Delegates. As a Whig, he served two consecutive terms from 1847-1849. As Lieutenant Governor he presided over the Virginia Senate.

== Early and family life ==
Cowper was born on the Macclesfield Estate, the family's plantation since a land grant by King Charles I in 1638, on the Isle of Wight County, Virginia. His father, William Cowper, was a former naval officer who became known for abusing his wife during her pregnancy. His mother, Ann Pierce Parker Cowper, was the daughter of former congressman Josiah Parker.This boy was born prematurely and remained sickly during his first year of life. In January 1817, his mother took him and fled the plantation, later explaining she feared for her life. Family and friends protected her until the Virginia General Assembly granted her a legal separation. She received legal custody of her children.

=== Education and personal life ===
Cowper received an education suitable to his class. He never married, but provided financially for several relatives. He formally adopted the four surviving daughters of his eldest brother, as well as paid for the education of several nephews.

== Career ==
Cowper practiced law in Portsmouth and Norfolk County. After his mother died, he bought two enslaved individuals from her estate in 1849. As the Civil War began, he owned one slave, which his biographer presumed one of those individuals.

Politically, Cowper aligned with the Whig party. Norfolk voters first elected him as one of their representatives to the Virginia House of Delegates in 1847, and re-elected him the following year, although his victories were by small margins and his co-delegate during his first term, George D. Happer, would become his successor (serving alongside his co-delegate from his second term).

=== Civil War, Restored Government and Lieutenant Governor ===
During the American Civil War, Union forces took control of Norfolk in May 1862, and in the summer of 1863 he became involved in a conflict between the local civilian government and military officials concerning relief for destitute families. Cowper served as President of the Virginia Senate that met at Alexandria, Virginia. After the Confederacy surrendered, but before Virginia adopted a new state constitution outlawing slavery, Cowper served as President of the Virginia Senate.

In May 1863, the Restored Government in Alexandria selected Cowper as candidate for lieutenant governor of the Restored government to replace a candidate from Berkeley County who had withdrawn. Although the candidates for governor and attorney general were unopposed, Cowper was challenged by Gilbert S. Miner, whom he defeated in the election held on May 28, 1863. Although Cowper was not slated to assume his new office until January 1864, Governor Francis Harrison Pierpont appointed him lieutenant governor on November 17, 1863, after the sitting lieutenant governor, Daniel Polsley, resigned. As lieutenant governor, Cowper presided over a state senate that consisted at full strength of six members, representing the districts of Accomack and Northampton Counties, Alexandria and Fairfax Counties, Elizabeth City County and the city of Hampton, Loudoun County, the city of Norfolk, and Norfolk and Princess Anne Counties.

== Later life ==
Cowper died on July 17, 1875 and was buried at Macclesfield, his family's estate at Smithfield in Isle of Wight County.

== Sources ==
- John T. Kneebone et al., eds., Dictionary of Virginia Biography (Richmond: The Library of Virginia, 1998- ), 3:497-499. ISBN 0-88490-206-4
  Political offices
  Preceded by Daniel Polsley	Lieutenant Governor of the Restored Government of Virginia; 1863–1865	Succeeded by none
  Preceded by Samuel Price	Lieutenant Governor of Virginia; 1865–1869	Succeeded by John F. Lewis
