= William Haymond =

William Haymond may refer to:

- Major William Haymond (1740–1821), US soldier and civil servant who served in the American Revolutionary War
- William S. Haymond (1823–1885), US representative from Indiana
