= Henry Gassaway Davis House =

Historic house in West Virginia, United States

- Henry Gassaway Davis Mansion
- U.S. National Register of Historic Places
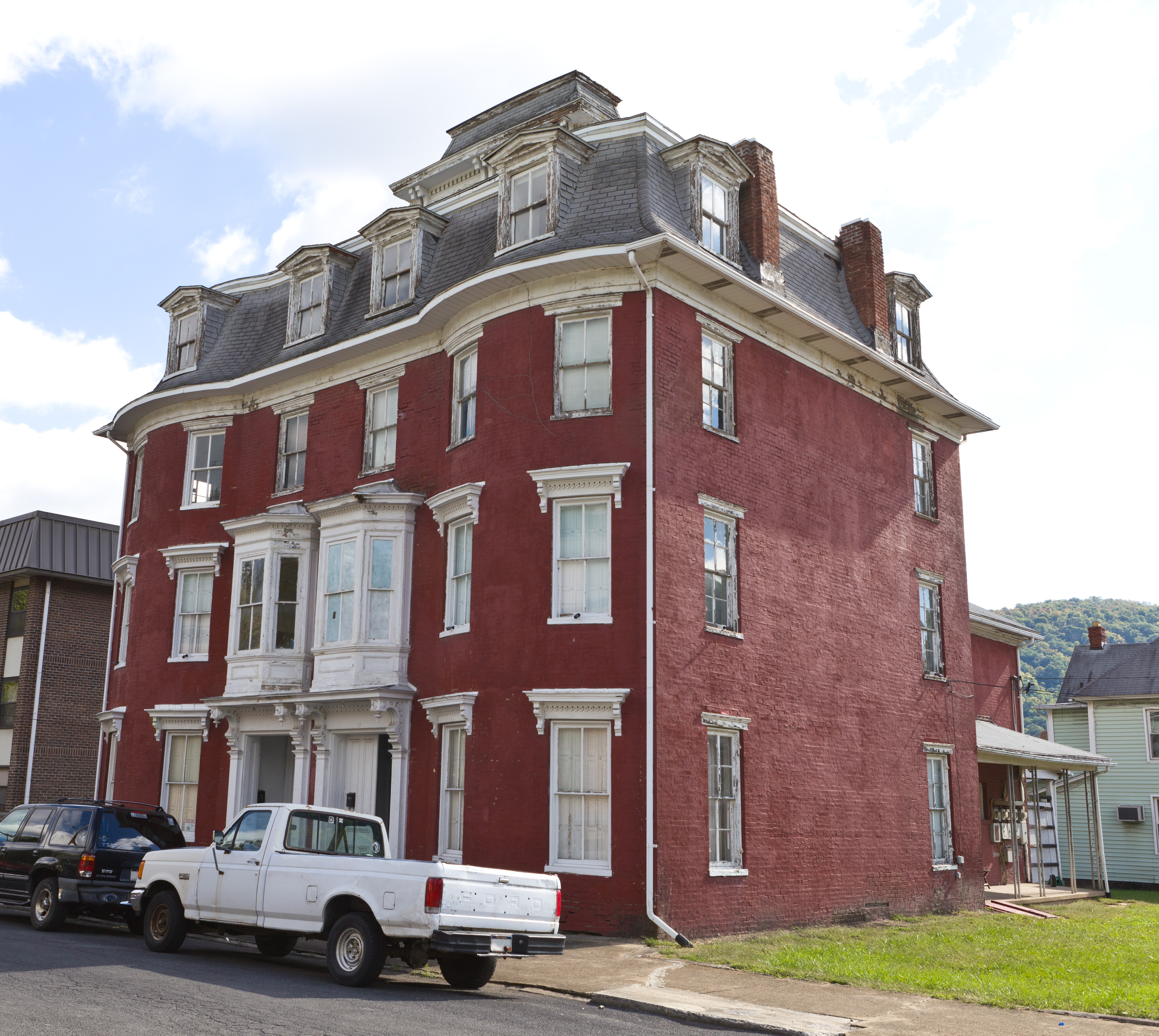

- Location within Eastern Panhandle of West Virginia Location within West Virginia Location within the United States
- Location: 15-17 Jones St. and 81 Second Street, Piedmont, West Virginia
- Coordinates: 39°28′55″N 79°2′59″W
- Area: less than one acre
- Built: 1871
- Built by: E.J. Fredlock Manufacturing Co.
- Architectural style: Second Empire
- NRHP reference No.: 08001239
- Added to NRHP: December 19, 2008

Henry Gassaway Davis House, also known as the Knights of Pythias Lafayette Lodge, No. 3, and Calanthe Temple, No. 8, Pythian Sisters, is a historic home located at Piedmont, Mineral County, West Virginia. It was built in 1871, for U.S. Senator and vice presidential nominee Henry G. Davis (1823–1916). It is a three-bay, four-story Second Empire style brick duplex. It has a simple mansard roof and 12 gabled pedimented dormer windows on the concave slopes. The front façade features dual stone-and-slate stairs, ascending to two centered paired six-by-nine-foot framed one-story entry porches.

It was listed on the National Register of Historic Places in 2008.
