= Stuart Manor =

Historic house in West Virginia, United States

- U.S. National Register of Historic Places
- Location within West Virginia Location within the United States
- Location: Southwest of Lewisburg off U.S. Route 219, near Lewisburg, West Virginia
- Coordinates: 37°45′58″N 80°29′59″W
- Area: 1 acre (0.40 ha)
- Built: 1789
- NRHP reference No.: 73001901
- Added to NRHP: July 27, 1973

Stuart Manor is a private historic home located near Lewisburg, Greenbrier County, West Virginia. The manor house was built in 1789. It is a long and low, two-story limestone building. It features thick gray walls and has a fort-like appearance. A two-story stone wing was added later, as were a number of frame additions. It features a verandah along two sides of the older wing. Also on the property is a one-room stone building built in 1778 and served as the county clerk's office for many years. The manor was home to Colonel John Stuart, considered the "Founder and Father of Greenbrier County." In 1884, "Gov." Samuel Price was interred in the Stuart Burying Ground.

It was listed on the National Register of Historic Places in 1973.
