= Henry G. Davis =

American politician and businessman (1823–1916)

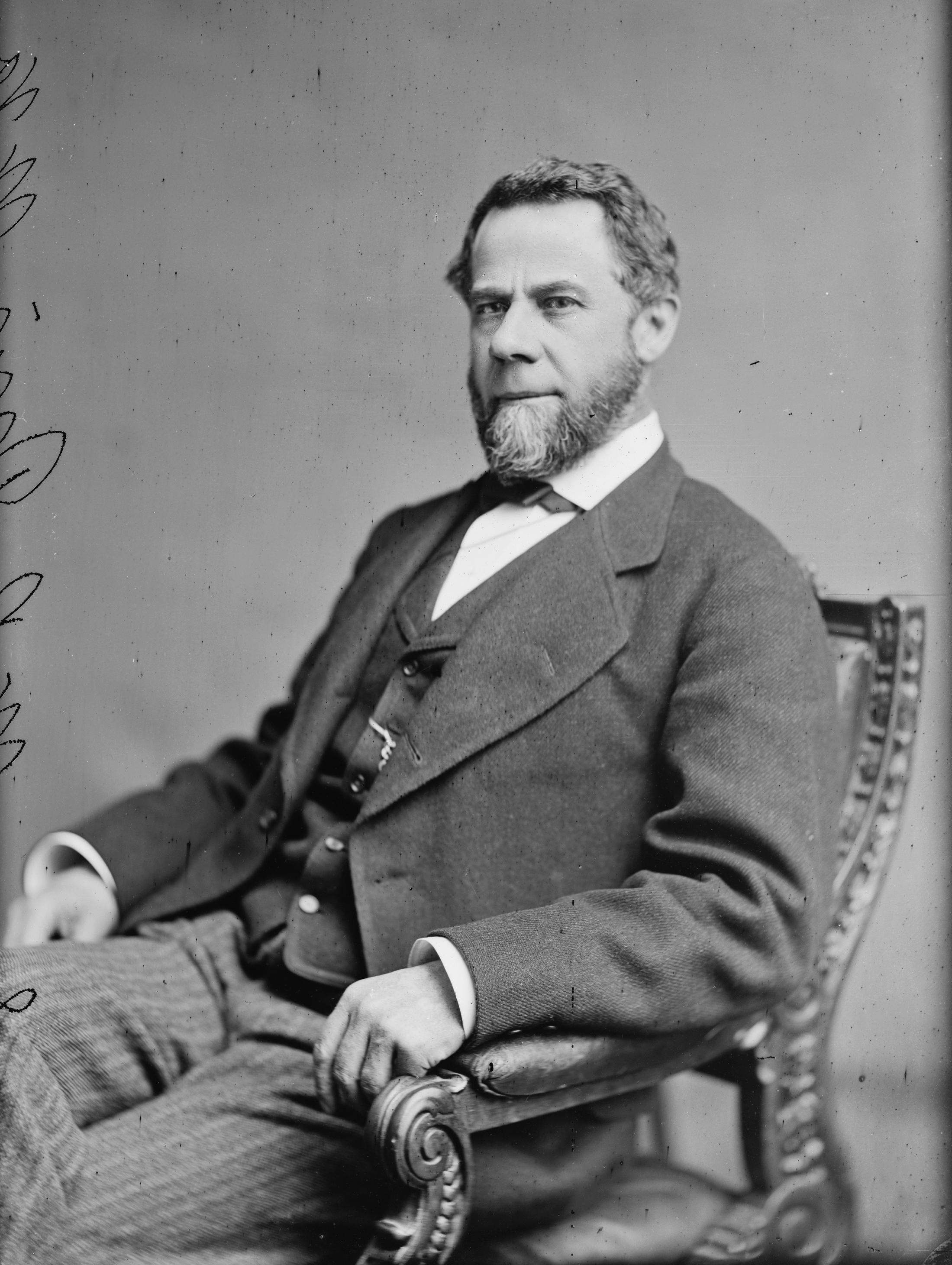
- Portrait, 1865–1880

United States Senator from West Virginia
- In office March 4, 1871 – March 3, 1883
- Preceded by: Waitman T. Willey
- Succeeded by: John E. Kenna

Personal details
- Born: Henry Gassaway Davis; November 16, 1823 Woodstock, Maryland, U.S.
- Died: March 11, 1916 (aged 92) Washington, D.C., U.S.
- Party: Democratic

Henry Gassaway Davis (November 16, 1823 – March 11, 1916) was an American politician and businessman who served as a United States senator from West Virginia from 1871 to 1883. He was the Democratic Party's nominee for Vice President of the United States in 1904.

Born on a farm in Howard County, Maryland, Davis became a railroad executive before branching out into coal mining and banking as founder of the Potomac and Piedmont Coal and Railway Company. He won election to both houses of the West Virginia Legislature before serving in the U.S. Senate. His younger brother, Thomas Beall Davis, also served in Congress. After his tenure in the Senate ended, Davis continued to grow his business interests. In partnership with his son-in-law, Stephen Benton Elkins, Davis created the Davis Coal and Coke Company and led it to become one of the largest coal companies in the world.

The 1904 Democratic National Convention nominated a ticket of Alton B. Parker for president and Davis for vice president. Davis was chosen primarily for his ability to provide funding to the campaign. At 80 years old, he was the oldest person ever on a major American party's national ticket. The Republican ticket of Theodore Roosevelt and Charles W. Fairbanks prevailed by a wide margin. After the election, Davis helped establish Davis & Elkins College. He died in Washington, D.C., aged 92.

== Biography ==
=== Early life ===
Henry Gassaway Davis was born near Woodstock, Howard County, Maryland, the son of Louisa Warfield (née Brown; March 10, 1799 – July 23, 1868) and merchant Caleb Dorsey Davis (March 3, 1792 – September 4, 1850). He was the great-great-great-grandson of Maryland pioneer Thomas Davis, and the great-great-great-great-grandson of Maryland politician and justice Colonel Nicholas Gassaway, both of whom were of Welsh ancestry and emigrated to Maryland in the mid-17th century.

Stage coaches stopped at Woodstock five days a week en route to Washington, D.C., and Davis later often recalled one of his earliest memories: witnessing the groundbreaking of the country's first railroad on July 4, 1828, from atop his father's shoulders in Baltimore.

Davis had three brothers and a sister. His father's business prospered until he won a contract to grade a section of road between Baltimore and Frederick, Maryland, which caused heavy losses. Creditors caused even the family's horses and carriages to be sold, which proved devastating to Caleb Davis's health.

== Early career ==
When his family's finances collapsed, Davis, then 15 years old, abandoned his education and took a job carrying water for workmen at a nearby quarry and then became caretaker of "Waverly", a nearby farm owned by Governor George Howard. When Davis was 20, the Baltimore and Ohio Railroad (B&O) completed track from Frederick to Cumberland, and needed men to run the trains and handle cargo. Thus, Davis went to work for the B&O as a brakeman. His hard work and enthusiasm drew the attention of the railroad's president, Thomas Swann, who promoted him to freight conductor and then passenger conductor. Davis met many statesmen, including Senators Henry Clay of Kentucky (Davis came to admire him and received invitations to visit at his home), Thomas H. Benton of Missouri, Lewis Cass of Michigan, Benjamin Wade and Thomas Corwin of Ohio, and Stephen A. Douglas of Illinois, all of whom embarked the B&O train in Cumberland to reach Washington, D.C. (or disembarked on the reverse route). Davis also often stayed at a hotel in Washington between trips and conversed with other notables, including Senators William C. Rives of Virginia, John C. Calhoun of South Carolina, and Daniel Webster of Massachusetts.

== Later career ==
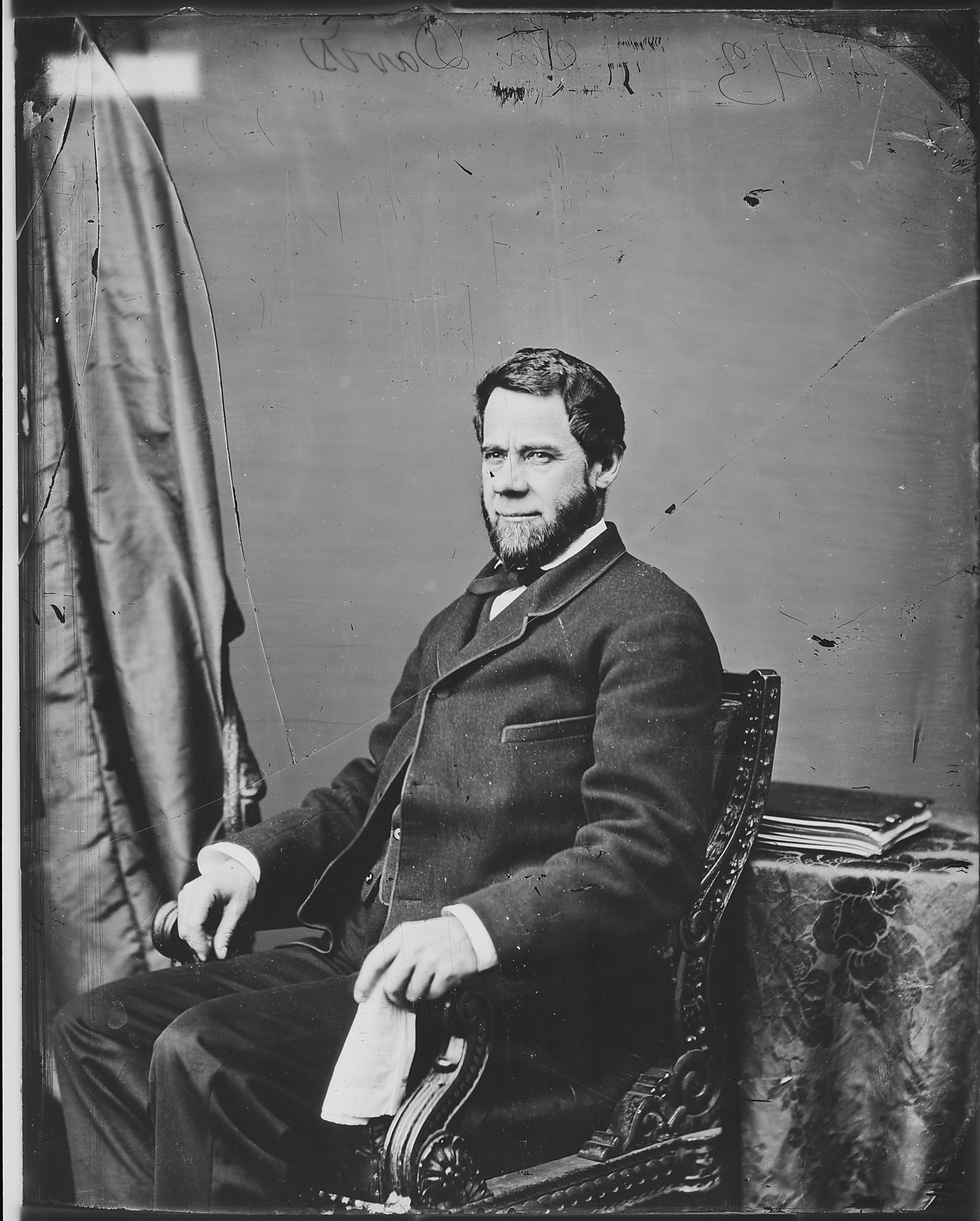
Photograph of Davis by Mathew Brady, c. 1860–65

In 1854, Gideon Bantz, Davis's father-in-law, died and left the newlyweds an inheritance of $50,000. Davis used this money to build a fortune worth millions. In 1855, when the B&O finally completed track to Wheeling on the navigable Ohio River, Davis was put in charge of the Piedmont station. It was a crucial station because it was at the foot of a mountain, where trains traveling eastward added engines to surmount the slope. Until the railroad completed a house for him (so that his new wife could join him), Davis lived in a box car and also came to admire the natural landscape of the Allegheny Mountains. After four years his brother Thomas joined him, and they established a store, often trading farm products for manufactured goods such as jeans, shoes, calico and sugar. In 1858, Davis resigned his railroad job to concentrate on the firm, Henry G. Davis & Company.

When the Civil War began, even the B&O's president, John Work Garrett, initially sympathized with the Confederacy. However, the B&O was crucial for the Union armies. Davis favored the Union and also admired the new President, Abraham Lincoln. When Confederate raiders attacked the B&O and destroyed track and bridges, part of Davis' job was to restore service and keep the supplies moving. Many in western Virginia likewise favored the Union, met in two Wheeling Conventions, and adopted a statehood referendum and constitution that eventually led to West Virginia becoming the 35th state. In 1865, Davis would be elected to the West Virginia House of Delegates as one of Hampshire County's representatives.

After the war Davis systematically explored the Alleghenies, particularly the area drained by the Potomac River to the east and the Cheat River on the western side of the eastern continental divide. He purchased land rich in timber or coal (often for $1 an acre). He soon built sawmills to process the lumber and extended branch railroads to new coal mines, and also invested in banking in Piedmont. By 1897, his empire included over 100,000 acres of coal land and 400 coke ovens in West Virginia. He had become a leading producer of bituminous coal in the United States. Simultaneously he built new railways such as the West Virginia Central and Pittsburg Railway. The lines connected much of eastern and central West Virginia to major transportation networks that enabled his coal to be shipped at low rates.

== Personal life ==
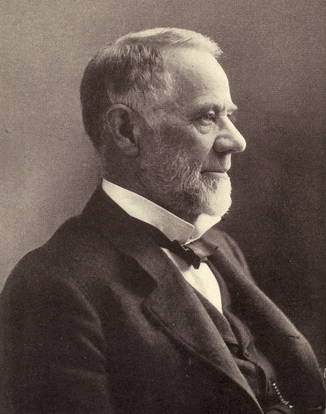
Davis in old age, c. 1904

On February 22, 1853, in Frederick County, Maryland. Davis married Katherine Ann Salome "Kate" Bantz. Henry and Katherine had eight children, three of whom died in infancy. One of those three is unidentified; the remaining seven were:

- (1) - Mary Louise "Hallie" Davis (December 19, 1853 – March 1, 1933) - She married industrialist and politician Stephen Benton Elkins (September 26, 1841 – January 4, 1911) on April 14, 1875, in Baltimore; her married name was Hallie Davis Elkins. Hallie Davis was Stephen Elkins's second wife; his first was Sarah Simms "Sallie" Jacobs (1845 – 1872), whom he had married in 1866 and with whom he had two children. His marriage with Hallie Davis produced five children. Elkins, a Republican, would become his father-in-law's protégé and business partner and die 22 years before his wife and five years before her father.
- (2) - Kate Bantz Davis (December 1, 1856 – January 21, 1903)
- (3) - Anderson Cord Davis (1859 - December 1862)
- (4) - Ada Kate Davis (January 14, 1862 - September 1863)
- (5) - Grace Thomas Davis (October 19, 1869 – January 18, 1931) (a.k.a. Gracie Davis)
- (6) - Henry Gassaway Davis Jr. (May 10, 1871 – April 24, 1896) (a.k.a. Harry Davis), lost at sea off the Atlantic coast of South Africa. Junior, West Virginia, was named after him.
- (7) - John Thomas Davis (March 31, 1874 – June 27, 1935)

=== Political and commercial life ===
In 1865, Davis was elected a member of the West Virginia House of Delegates. The following year, he founded the Potomac and Piedmont Coal and Railway Company with the intent of furnishing transportation to his coal mining and timbering interests. The company was given the right to construct railroad grades in Mineral, Grant, Tucker and Randolph counties. He became a state senator in 1869. In 1870, he was elected to the United States Senate, serving two terms, with his service ending in 1883.

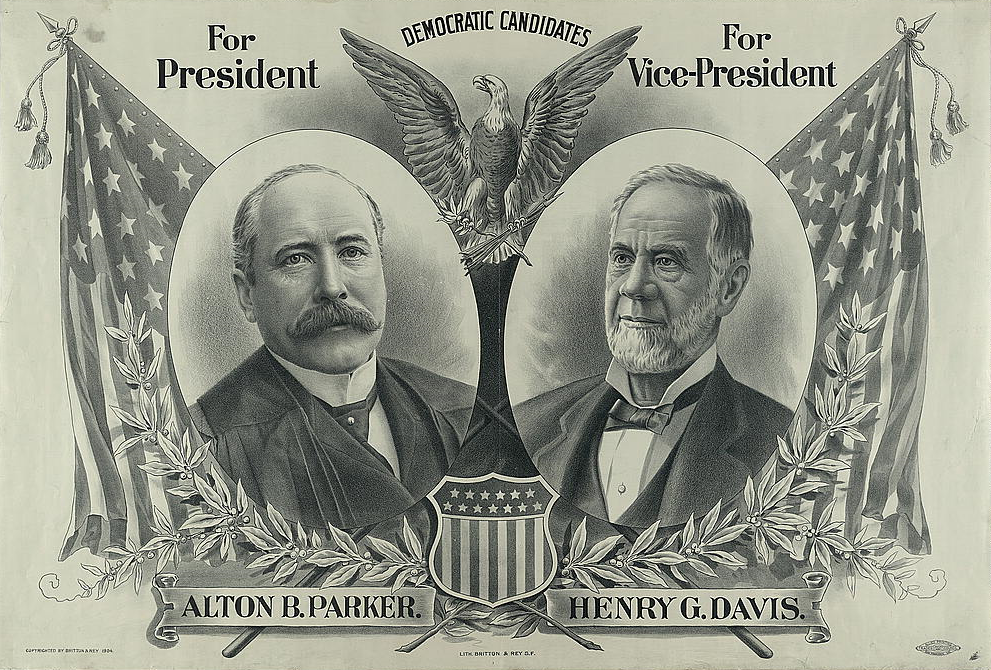
Parker/Davis campaign poster

Following his service in the Senate, Davis retired to Elkins, West Virginia, where he resumed banking and coal mining. Davis's company now controlled 135,000 acres (550 km^{2}), employed 1,600 men of sixteen nationalities, operated two power plants, and worked over 1,000 coke ovens and 9 mines within one mile (1.6 km) of the central office at Coketon in Tucker County. By 1892, the Davis Coal and Coke Company, a partnership between Davis and his son-in-law, Senator Stephen Benton Elkins, was among the largest coal companies in the world.

Davis represented the U.S. at the Pan-American Conferences of 1889 and 1901.

==== Vice presidential candidacy ====
In 1904, Davis became the Democratic nominee for vice president, on a ticket with Alton B. Parker. They lost to the Republican ticket of Theodore Roosevelt and Charles W. Fairbanks by a wide margin. At the age of 80, Davis was and remains the oldest person to be nominated on a major party's presidential ticket. (Note: Joe Biden planned to run for a second term as president in the 2024 United States presidential election at the age of 81, but he withdrew his candidacy in July 2024.) He was chosen primarily because of his ability to provide much-needed funds to the campaign.

=== Later years ===
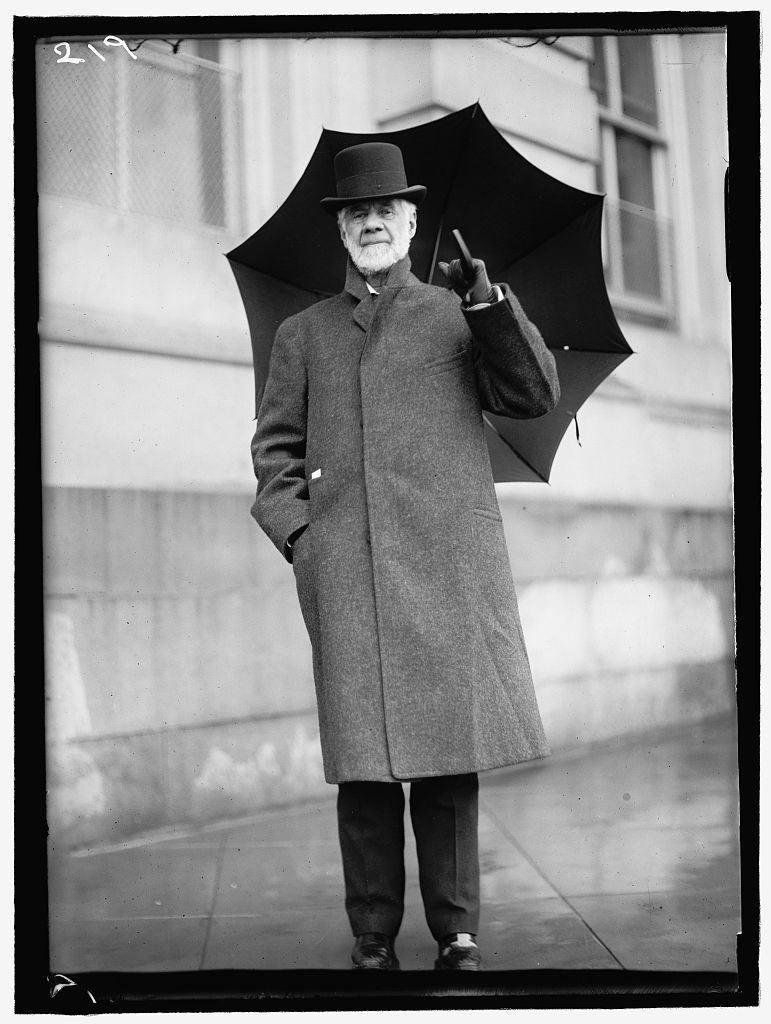
Davis in 1911

In his last years, Davis acted as chairman of the permanent Pan American Railway Committee (1901–1916) and also donated land to build Davis and Elkins College in Elkins, West Virginia. He died in Washington, D.C., on March 11, 1916, at the age of 92. He was interred in the Maplewood Cemetery in Elkins. A bronze equestrian statue of Davis was erected in 1927, at Sycamore Street and Randolph Avenue in Elkins, with an identical twin in Davis Park in downtown Charleston, West Virginia.

== Legacy ==
- Davis and Elkins College, in Elkins, WV; named for Senators Davis and Elkins
- Graceland (Elkins, West Virginia); the summer home for Davis and a National Historic Landmark
- Henry Gassaway Davis House; Davis' home at Piedmont, West Virginia, built in 1871
- He is the namesake of the town of Henry, West Virginia
- He is the namesake of the town of Gassaway, West Virginia
- He is the namesake of the town of Davis, West Virginia

== Notes ==
U.S. Senate
Preceded by Waitman T. Willey	U.S. Senator (Class 2) from West Virginia; 1871–1883; Served alongside: Arthur I. Boreman, Allen T. Caperton, Samuel Price, Frank Hereford, Johnson N. Camden	Succeeded by John E. Kenna
Preceded by William Windom	Chair of the Senate Appropriations Committee; 1879–1881	Succeeded by William B. Allison
Party political offices
Preceded by Adlai Stevenson (I)	Democratic nominee Vice President of the United States; 1904	Succeeded by John W. Kern
