= Josiah Parker =

American politician

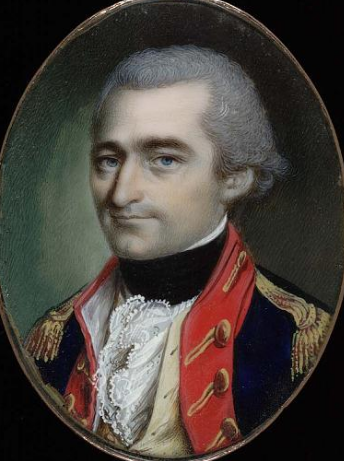

Member of the U.S. House of Representatives from Virginia's 11th district
- In office March 4, 1793 – March 3, 1801
- Preceded by: District established
- Succeeded by: Thomas Newton, Jr.

Member of the U.S. House of Representatives from Virginia's 8th district
- In office March 4, 1789 – March 3, 1793
- Preceded by: District established
- Succeeded by: Thomas Claiborne

Member of the Virginia House of Delegates from Isle of Wight County
- In office 1782–1783; Alongside John S. Wills
- In office 1779; Alongside John S. Wills

Personal details
- Born: May 11, 1751 Isle of Wight County, Virginia Colony, British America
- Died: March 11, 1810 (aged 58) Isle of Wight County, Virginia, U.S.
- Party: Federalist
- Other political affiliations: Pro-Administration (3rd Congress), Anti-Administration (1st & 2nd Congress)
- Spouse: Mary Pierce Bridger

Military service
- Branch/service: Continental Army
- Years of service: 1775–1778
- Rank: Colonel
- Unit: 5th Virginia Regiment
- Battles/wars: American Revolutionary War; Battle of Trenton; Battle of Princeton; Battle of Brandywine; Battle of Germantown

Josiah Parker (May 11, 1751 – March 11, 1810) was an American politician, Revolutionary War officer and Virginia planter who served in the United States House of Representatives from Virginia in the First through Sixth United States Congresses as well as represented Isle of Wight County in three of the five Virginia Revolutionary Conventions and in the Virginia House of Delegates for several terms before his federal service.

== Early life ==
Parker was born at the Macclesfield Estate in Isle of Wight County in the Colony of Virginia. The property was obtained by his family as a land grant from King Charles the I in 1638. In 1773, he married the widow Mary Pierce Bridger. They had one child, Anne Pierce Parker, (ca 1775, Isle of Wight Co., VA - March 21, 1849). who received a legislative divorce from her abusive husband after the father's death, though her son Leopold Copeland Parker Cowper would follow his maternal grandfather's path into politics.

== Revolutionary War ==
In 1775, a year after the Fairfax Resolves and Virginia's first revolutionary convention, Parker won election to his first legislative office, as one of Isle of Wight county's two part-time representatives (alongside John Scarsbrook Wills) to the Second Virginia Convention, which met at St. John's Church in Richmond in March 1775, then both men also represented their county in the Third Virginia Convention that met in July and August (also in Richmond and which established the Virginia Committee of Safety to act as an executive body between sessions), and at the Fourth Virginia Convention of December 1775 and January 1776. Isaac Fulgham represented the county alongside John Scarsbrook Wills during the Fifth Virginia Convention.

When the American Revolutionary War began in April 1775, Parker enlisted in the Continental Army. He was promptly commissioned a major in the 5th Virginia Regiment on February 13, 1776, promoted to lieutenant colonel on July 28, 1777, and became its colonel on April 1, 1778. His regiment served in Virginia under General Charles Lee until the autumn of 1776, when the 5th Virginia Regiment was transferred to George Washington’s army. The regiment thereafter saw action at the Battle of Trenton, Battle of Princeton, Battle of Brandywine, Battle of Germantown, Battle of Monmouth and the Siege of Charleston.

At the Battle of Trenton, Parker had the honor to receive Hessian Colonel Johann Rall's sword of surrender and he alone holds a sword in the painting, The Capture of the Hessians at Trenton, December 26, 1776 by John Trumbull.

Parker resigned from the army on July 12, 1778 and Isle of Wight voters elected as one of Isle of Wight county's two (part-time) representatives in the Virginia House of Delegates (again alongside John Scarsbrook Wills.) However the legislative session was in two parts, and fellow legislators refused to seat him at the first session because he was a colonel of the 5th Virginia Regiment on election days, and thus ineligible to serve as a legislator, so Samuel Hardy was elected to replace him on October 3, 1778 and sat in the December session. Voters elected Parker to the Assembly of 1779, and he again served alongside John Scarsbrook Wills, although again replaced by Samuel Hardy for the Assembly of 1780-1781. During Cornwallis's Virginia campaign in 1781, the notorious Colonel Tarleton ransacked Parker's home.

In August 1781, Lafayette sent Parker to Portsmouth, Virginia on a reconnaissance. He found the British had embarked for Yorktown. Parker recovered 25 cannons the British had thrown into the sea to prevent their capture.

Isle of Wight voters again elected Parker and Wills as their delegates to the General Assembly sessions of 1782, and re-elected both men to the part-time delegate position in 1783 assembly session.

== Post-war ==
In 1786, Parker accepted an officer's commission in the US Navy officer at Portsmouth, Virginia. He ran to become a delegate to the 1788 Virginia Convention, since he opposed surrendering Virginia's hard won independence by ratifying the United States Constitution.

However, after Virginia ratified the new federal constitution, he accepted election to the First United States Congress. He also won reelection to the Second and Third Congresses. He successfully ran as a Federalist and won election to the Fourth through Sixth United States Congress. Declaring it was time to "wipe off the stigma" of slavery that stained America, Parker became the first national legislator in American history to formally introduce an antislavery motion in Congress, and was one of seven representatives to vote against the Fugitive Slave Act of 1793. Parker then returned home and farmed on his plantation back in Isle of Wight county.

== Death and legacy ==
Parker died in 1810, and was buried in the family cemetery on his plantation, "Macclesfield", in Isle of Wight County, Virginia.

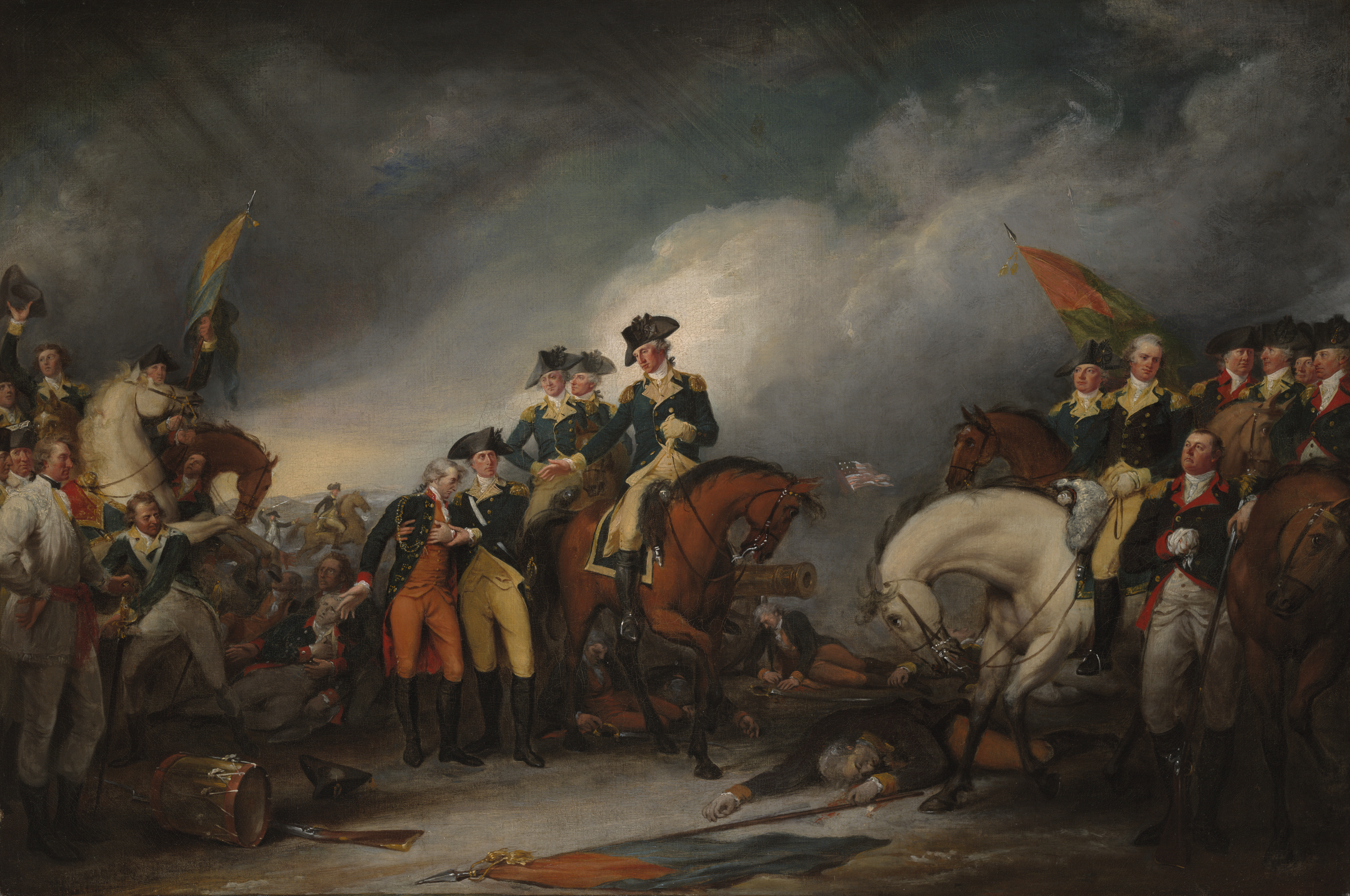
The Capture of the Hessians by John Trumbull, Parker is on the far left, dressed in white

His grandson, Leopold Copeland Parker Cowper, born to his daughter the year after Col Parker died, served two terms representing Isle of Wight County in the Virginia House of Delegates, and became as lieutenant Governor in the Restored Government of Virginia after the American Civil War.

The Col. Josiah Parker Family Cemetery was listed on the National Register of Historic Places in 2004.

A World War II Liberty Ship, SS Josiah Parker, was named in his honor.

U.S. House of Representatives
Preceded by District established	Member of the U.S. House of Representatives from Virginia's 8th congressional district 1789–1793	Succeeded by Thomas Claiborne
Preceded by District established	Member of the U.S. House of Representatives from Virginia's 11th congressional district 1793–1801	Succeeded by Thomas Newton
