= Samuel Price =

American politician (1805–1884)

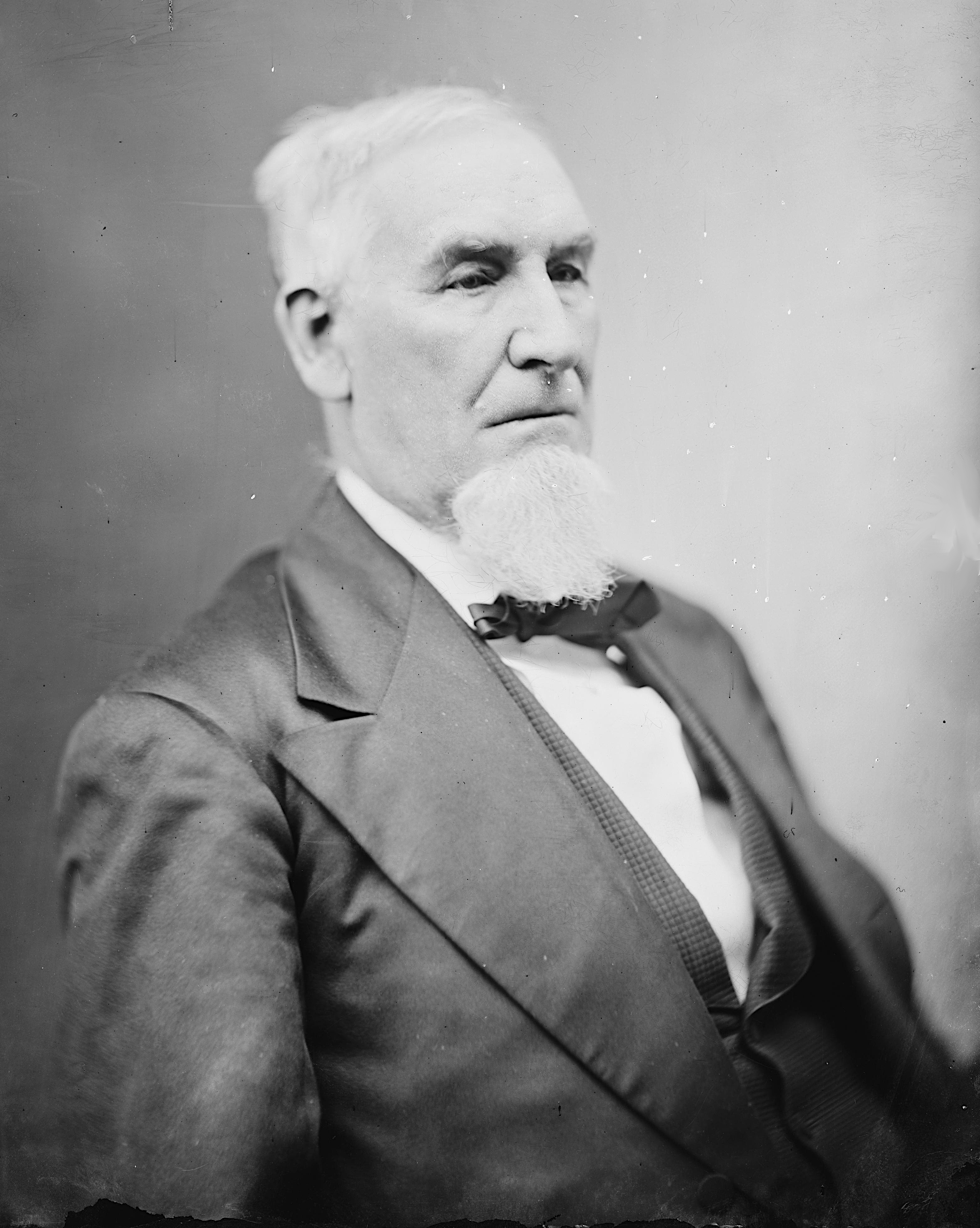
- Price, 1865–1880

United States Senator from West Virginia
- In office August 26, 1876 – January 26, 1877
- Appointed by: John J. Jacob
- Preceded by: Allen T. Caperton
- Succeeded by: Frank Hereford

5th Lieutenant Governor of Virginia
- In office 1864–1865
- Governor: William Smith
- Preceded by: Robert L. Montague
- Succeeded by: Leopold C. P. Cowper

Member of the Virginia House of Delegates
- In office 1834-1836

Personal details
- Born: July 28, 1805 Fauquier County, Virginia
- Died: February 25, 1884 (aged 78) Lewisburg, West Virginia
- Party: Democratic

Samuel Price (July 28, 1805 – February 25, 1884) was a Virginia lawyer and politician who helped to establish the state of West Virginia during the American Civil War. Upon West Virginia's statehood, Price became its Lieutenant Governor and was later appointed as a United States senator.

== Early and family life ==
Born in Fauquier County, Virginia, Price moved with his parents to Preston County (now in West Virginia) in 1815. He received a preparatory training and read law.

== Career ==
Admitted to the Virginia bar in 1832, Price began practicing law in Nicholas and Braxton Counties. He was elected Nicholas county clerk in 1830 and Commonwealth Attorney in 1833. He owned slaves.

Voters elected Price to the Virginia House of Delegates, where he represented Nicholas County part time from 1834 to 1836, then moved to Wheeling, Virginia (now West Virginia) in 1836 and to Lewisburg, Virginia (now West Virginia) in 1838. He was the prosecuting attorney for Braxton County from 1836 to 1850 and represented Braxton County in the Virginia House of Delegates from 1847 to 1850 and again in 1852.

Price was a delegate to the Virginia Constitutional Convention of 1850, and the Virginia Secession Convention of 1861 where he voted against secession. In 1863 he was elected the fifth Lieutenant Governor of Virginia and served until the close of the Civil War.

He was a delegate to the constitutional convention of West Virginia in 1872 and its president. He was appointed as a Democrat to the U.S. Senate to fill the vacancy caused by the death of Allen T. Caperton and served from August 26, 1876, to January 26, 1877, when a successor was elected. He was an unsuccessful candidate in 1876 for election to fill the vacancy.

== Death and legacy ==
In 1884, Price died in Lewisburg. Interment was in the Stuart Burying Ground at Stuart Manor, near Lewisburg.

The Gov. Samuel Price House at Lewisburg was listed on the National Register of Historic Places in 1975.

Political offices
Preceded by Andrew J. Montague	Lieutenant Governor of Virginia; 1864–1865	Succeeded by Leopold C. P. Cowper
U.S. Senate
Preceded by Allen T. Caperton	U.S. senator (Class 1) from West Virginia; 1876–1877; Served alongside: Henry G. Davis	Succeeded by Frank Hereford
