= Frank Hereford (politician) =

American politician

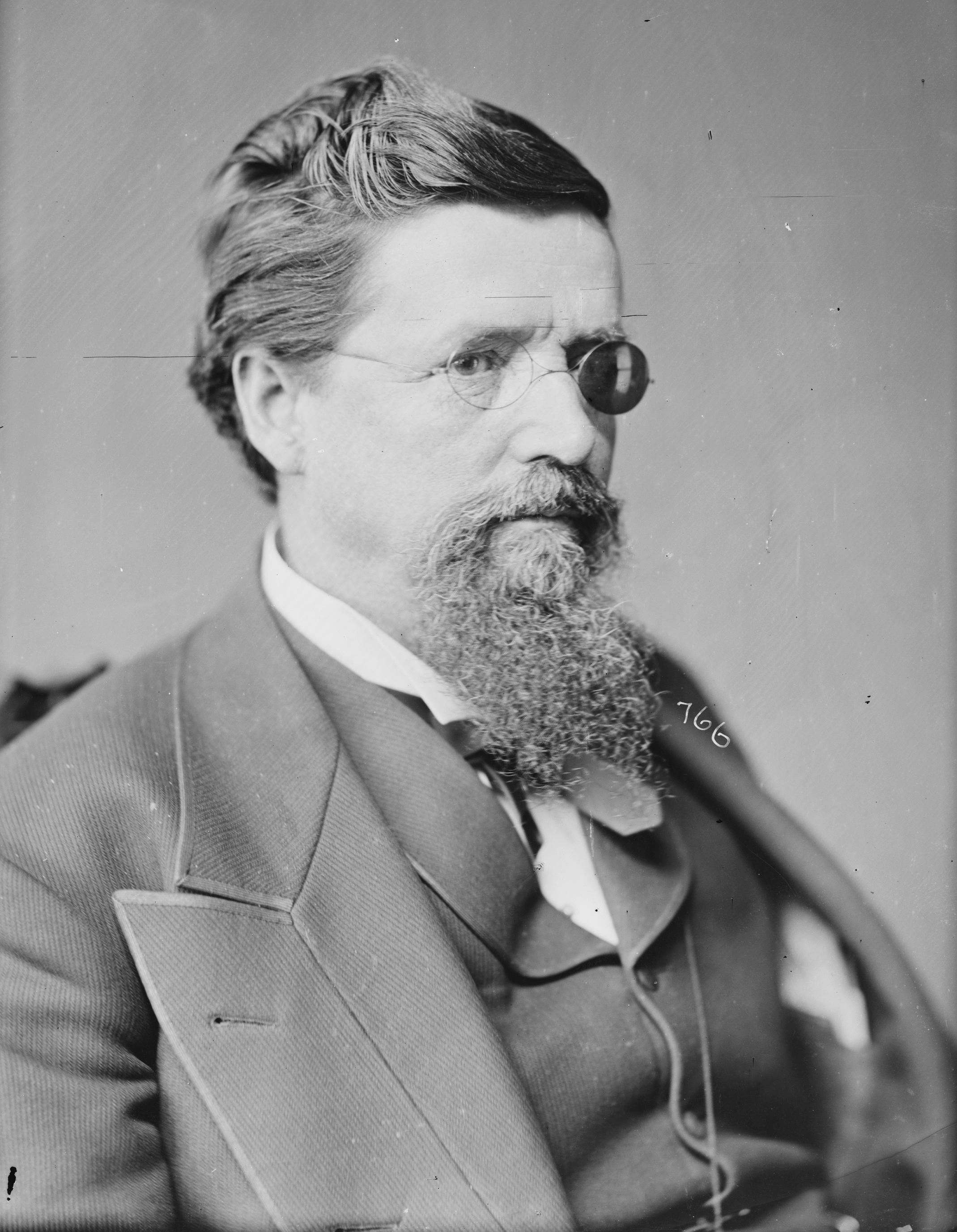

United States Senator from West Virginia
- In office January 31, 1877 – March 3, 1881
- Preceded by: Samuel Price
- Succeeded by: Johnson N. Camden

Member of the U.S. House of Representatives from West Virginia's 3rd district
- In office March 4, 1871 – January 31, 1877
- Preceded by: John Witcher
- Succeeded by: John E. Kenna

Personal details
- Born: July 4, 1825 Warrenton, Virginia
- Died: December 21, 1891 (aged 66) Union, West Virginia
- Party: Democratic

Frank Hereford (July 4, 1825 – December 21, 1891) was a United States representative and senator from West Virginia.

== Early and family life ==
Born near Warrenton, Fauquier County, Virginia, he completed preparatory studies and graduated from McKendree University (Lebanon, Illinois) in 1845.

== Career ==
Hereford studied law and was admitted to the Virginia bar and practiced. He moved to California in 1849 during the California Gold Rush and was district attorney of Sacramento County from 1855 to 1857.

== Congress ==
He moved to West Virginia and was elected as a Democrat to the Forty-second, Forty-third, and Forty-fourth Congresses and served from March 4, 1871, until January 31, 1877, when he resigned. As a Representative, he was chairman of the Committee on Commerce (Forty-fourth Congress).

Hereford was elected as a Democrat to the U.S. Senate on January 26, 1877, to fill the vacancy caused by the death of Allen Taylor Caperton, but didn't qualify until he resigned from the U.S. House of Representatives. He served from January 31, 1877, to March 3, 1881. As a Senator, he was chairman of the Committee on Mines and Mining (Forty-sixth Congress).

== After Congress ==
He resumed the practice of law and died in Union, West Virginia in 1891. Interment was in Green Hill Cemetery.

U.S. House of Representatives
Preceded by John S. Witcher	U.S. Representative of West Virginia's 3rd Congressional District; 1871–1877	Succeeded by John E. Kenna
U.S. Senate
Preceded by Samuel Price	U.S. senator (Class 1) from West Virginia; 1877–1881; Served alongside: Henry G. Davis	Succeeded by Johnson N. Camden
