= 34th Virginia Cavalry Battalion =

34th Virginia Cavalry Battalion 1st Battalion, Virginia Mounted Rifles
- Flag of Virginia, 1861
- Active: December 1862 – April 1865
- Disbanded: April 1865
- Country: Confederate States of America
- Branch: Confederate States Army
- Type: Cavalry
- Nickname(s): Witcher's Battalion
- Engagements: American Civil War: Battle of Gettysburg; Battle of Piedmont; Valley Campaigns of 1864

Commanders
- Notable commanders: Lt. Col. Vincent A. Witcher

The 34th Virginia Cavalry Battalion was a cavalry battalion raised in the Appalachian mountain region of southwestern Virginia as well as adjoining areas of what became West Virginia as well as Tennessee, Kentucky and North Carolina for service in the Confederate States Army during the American Civil War. It fought in western Virginia, East Tennessee, with the Army of Northern Virginia and the Shenandoah Valley.

The 1st Battalion, Virginia Mounted Rifles was organized in December, 1861 and was absorbed into Virginia's 34th Cavalry Battalion in December 1862. Lieutenant Colonel Vincent "Clawhammer" Witcher and Majors John A. McFarlane and [John] William Straton were in command. During the war it served in the cavalry brigades of Albert G. Jenkins, William E. Jones and Bradley T. Johnson. McFarlane's popular company grew and split into two and was called a "squadron", as well as assigned to Brig. Gen. Humphrey Marshall's command in 1862 and then assigned to Jesse's Battalion Kentucky Mounted Rifles under Major Allen L. McAfee and later assigned under Brig. Gen. William Preston. Meanwhile, Witcher (who got the epithet "clawhammer" based on his daring as well as wearing a long, spike-tailed coat into battle), was accused of committing wartime atrocities several times, and was court-martialed by Gen. Jones before his wartime death. Shortly before the war, Witcher had been involved in a shooting in the Franklin County courthouse in which his cousin's husband James Clement was shot dead, along with two of his brothers (attorney Ralph Clement representing him in the very messy divorce proceeding). All the 34th Virginia cavalry's commanding officers survived the war; and both Witcher and Straton became involved in politics. Witcher (named after his grandfather who had served in both houses of the Virginia General Assembly) failed to win election to the Virginia House of Delegates, but Straton (the former clerk of Logan County) was elected to the West Virginia House of Delegates.

The battalion first engaged the Federals in western Virginia. On November 10, 1861 it raided the town of Guyandotte, where Col. (and future Congressman) Kellian Whaley was recruiting for the Union army. It captured Whaley and several others; Whaley managed to escape. CSA General John B. Floyd was also concerned about allegations of plunder and robbery conducted by Witcher and his men, and ordered Witcher arrested for two murders, but Gen. Humphrey Marshall ordered Witcher released and his rangers placed under his command.

Although most of its activities involved raiding (and execution via a bent sapling was nicknamed "Witcher's parole"), the battalion fielded 172 men at the Battle of Gettysburg. Then it returned to western Virginia, as well as became involved in operations in East Tennessee. During April, 1864, after new recruits in the new state of West Virginia added Company K, it contained 222 effectives. It saw action at the Battle of Piedmont Augusta County, Virginia in which CSA Gen. Jones died, and fought with CSA General Early in the Shenandoah Valley. The 34th disbanded at Lynchburg in April, 1865.

== Companies and officers ==
Sortable table
Company	Nickname	Recruited at	First (then later) Commanding Officer
A	Witcher's Company	Wayne County; Buchanan County	Vincent A. Witcher; John L. Keller; Jacob Baldwin
B	Straton's Company	Cabell County; Logan County; Boone County; Putnam County; Kanawha County	William Straton; John Chapman; John Wilson
C	McDowell Partisan Rangers	McDowell County; Buchanan County; Tazewell County	Elias V. Harman; David G. Sayers; Daniel H. Harman
D	Company D, 1st battalion Virginia mounted rifles	Logan County	Barnett Carter; A.S. Fry
E	Company E, 1st battalion Virginia mounted rifles	McDowell County; Buchanan County; Tazewell County	John Yost; James Randall Kent Jr.
F	60th Tennessee mounted infantry	Washington County, Tennessee; Sullivan County, Tennessee	R.C. Brown
G	Company B, 22nd Virginia Cavalry	transfers from company A and company I	Leonidas A. Webb
H	Captain Boyd's Virginia Cavalry Company	Company L or K, 27th Virginia Cavalry	Robert C. Boyd
I	Captain John A. McFarlane's Company or squadron	6th Confederate Cavalry	John A. McFarlane
K	Company K	Mercer County; Raleigh County; Giles County; Wyoming County	James T. Sweeney

== See also ==
- List of Virginia Civil War units
- List of West Virginia Civil War Confederate units
