= John E. Kenna =

American politician (1848–1893)

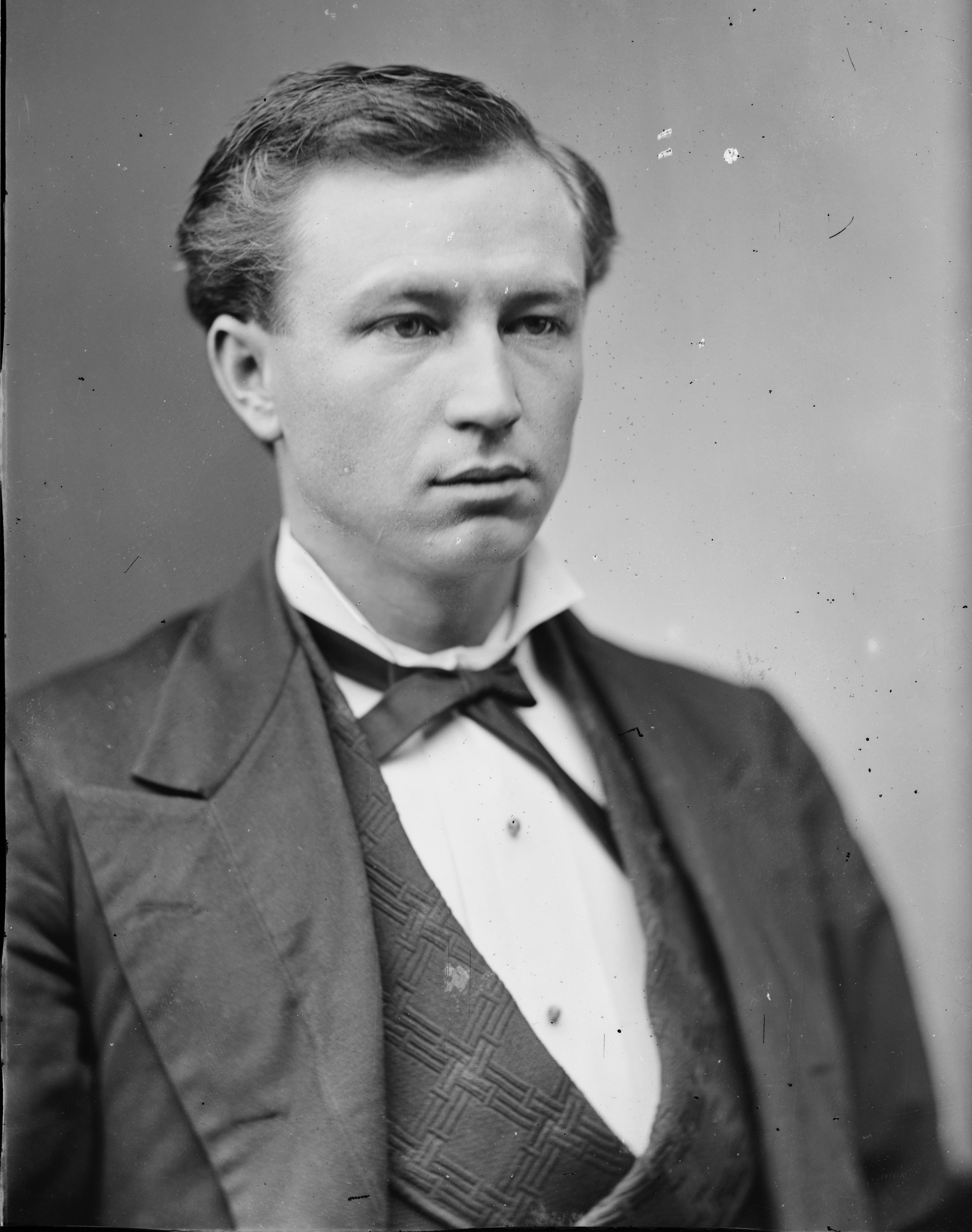
- Portrait c. 1870–80

United States Senator from West Virginia
- In office March 4, 1883 – January 11, 1893
- Preceded by: Henry G. Davis
- Succeeded by: Johnson N. Camden

Member of the U.S. House of Representatives from West Virginia's 3rd district
- In office March 4, 1877 – March 3, 1883
- Preceded by: Frank Hereford
- Succeeded by: Charles P. Snyder

Personal details
- Born: April 10, 1848 Kanawha County, Virginia (now West Virginia)
- Died: January 11, 1893 (aged 44) Washington, D.C.
- Party: Democratic

John Edward Kenna (April 10, 1848 – January 11, 1893) was an American politician who was a senator from West Virginia from 1883 until his death.

== Biography ==
Kenna was born in Kanawha County, Virginia (now West Virginia, near the city of St. Albans) and lived his early life at Upper Falls, where his father was lockmaster and owned a sawmill. He had little education, and at the age of 16 he served in the "Iron Brigade" with General Joseph O. Shelby in the Confederate States Army and was wounded. After returning home, he read law and was admitted to the bar in 1870. He became very active in the emerging Democratic Party of West Virginia.

He rose from prosecuting attorney of Kanawha County in 1872 to Justice pro tempore of the county circuit in 1875, and to the United States House of Representatives in 1876. While in the House he championed railroad legislation and crusaded for aid for slack-water navigation to help the coal, timber, and salt industries in his state. These activities earned him a seat in the United States Senate in 1883, where he continued fighting for his two causes.

Kenna became Democratic minority leader and emerged as a powerful and controversial speaker on the issue of the independence of the executive branch of the government. He forcefully defended President Grover Cleveland on several issues and indicted the Senate Republican majority for failure to pass tariff reforms. Kenna was a practicing Catholic and member of the congregation at St. Joseph's on Capitol Hill in Washington, D.C. In late April 1891, he successfully argued the Ball v. United States case before the U.S. Supreme Court, which spared the lives of two West Virginians accused of murder in Texas.

Kenna died on January 11, 1893, at the age of 44, having suffered from heart disease for several years. He was still in office at the time of his death, and was succeeded by Johnson N. Camden. He had 6 children, including Ed Kenna.

Longtime Washington journalist Benjamin Perley Poore described Kenna as "a tall, thick-set man" who was "negligent in his dress and rather slow in the utterance of his sentences."

Kenna is the namesake of the town of Kenna, West Virginia. In 1901, the state of West Virginia donated a marble statue of Kenna to the U.S. Capitol's National Statuary Hall Collection.

== See also ==
- List of members of the United States Congress who died in office (1790–1899)

U.S. House of Representatives
Preceded by Frank Hereford	U.S. Representative of West Virginia's 3rd Congressional District; 1877–1883	Succeeded by Charles P. Snyder
U.S. Senate
Preceded by Henry G. Davis	U.S. senator (Class 2) from West Virginia; 1883–1893; Served alongside: Johnson N. Camden, Charles J. Faulkner	Succeeded by Johnson N. Camden
