= SS Josiah Parker =

World War II Liberty ship of the United States

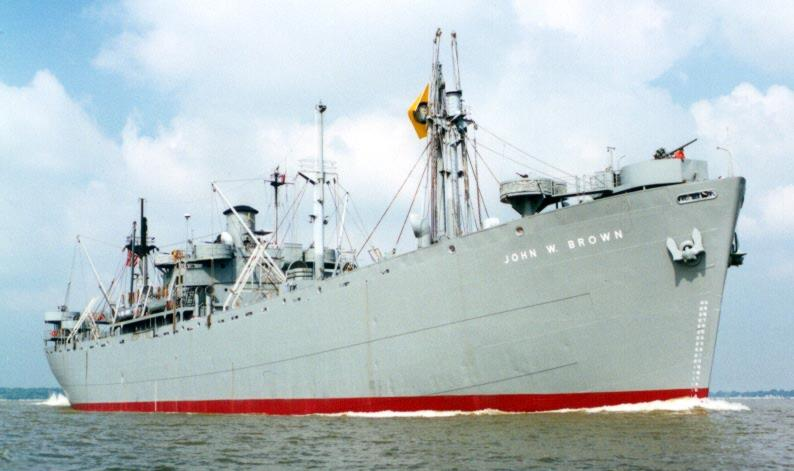
- Josiah Parker was a standard liberty ship, similar to SS John W. Brown, seen here.

History
- Name: Josiah Parker
- Namesake: Josiah Parker
- Owner: War Shipping Administration
- Port of registry: (United States) New Orleans
- Builder: Delta Shipbuilding Co, New Orleans
- Yard number: 44
- Way number: 8
- Laid down: 16 July 1942
- Launched: 26 September 1942
- Completed: 21 October 1942
- Fate: Scrapped 1964

General characteristics
- Class & type: Liberty ship; type EC2-S-C1, standard
- Tonnage: 10,865 LT DWT; 7,176 GRT
- Length: 441 feet 6 inches (135 m) oa; 416 feet (127 m) pp; 427 feet (130 m) lwl
- Beam: 57 feet (17 m)
- Height: 34 ft 8 in (10.57 m)
- Draft: 27 ft 9.25 in (8.4646 m)
- Propulsion: 1 × triple-expansion steam engine, (manufactured by General Machinery Corp., Hamilton, Ohio); 1 × screw propeller
- Speed: 11.5 knots (21.3 km/h; 13.2 mph)
- Capacity: 562,608 cubic feet (15,931 m^{3}) (grain); 499,573 cubic feet (14,146 m^{3}) (bale)
- Crew: 38–62 USMM; 21–40 USNAG
- Armament: Varied by ship; Bow-mounted 3-inch (76 mm)/50-caliber gun; Stern-mounted 4-inch (102 mm)/50-caliber gun; 2–8 × single 20-millimeter (0.79 in) Oerlikon anti-aircraft (AA) cannons and/or, 2–8 × 37-millimeter (1.46 in) M1 AA guns

SS Josiah Parker was a liberty ship built during World War II by Delta Shipbuilding Company, New Orleans, an EC2-S-C1 Type. The ship was named for Josiah Parker (1751 – 1810), an American politician who was a member of the United States House of Representatives from Virginia in the First through Sixth United States Congresses.

The SS Josiah Parker's Official Number was 242368. It was owned by the United States War Shipping Administration. Its MC Hull No. was 0132. It was laid down on July 16, 1942, and launched September 26, 1942.

== Convoy UGS-37, 1944 ==
SS Josiah Parker was one of the 37 ships carrying United States Navy Armed Guards in Convoy UGS-37, April 11–12, 1944.

"They were some 35 miles east of Algiers near midnight of April 11 and 12 when an undetermined number of enemy planes attacked. No ship carrying Armed Guards was hit by the enemy, but several ships received minor damage from the gunfire of other ships. Practically all ships opened fire and the amount of flak falling was quite heavy ... The Josiah Parker reported an explosion on one of the escorts and indicated that she too was hit by shell fragments."

The SS Josiah Parker was sold to private interests in 1947 and scrapped in 1964.
