= Josiah Parker Family Cemetery =

Historic cemetery in Virginia, United States

- Col. Josiah Parker Family Cemetery
- U.S. National Register of Historic Places
- Virginia Landmarks Register
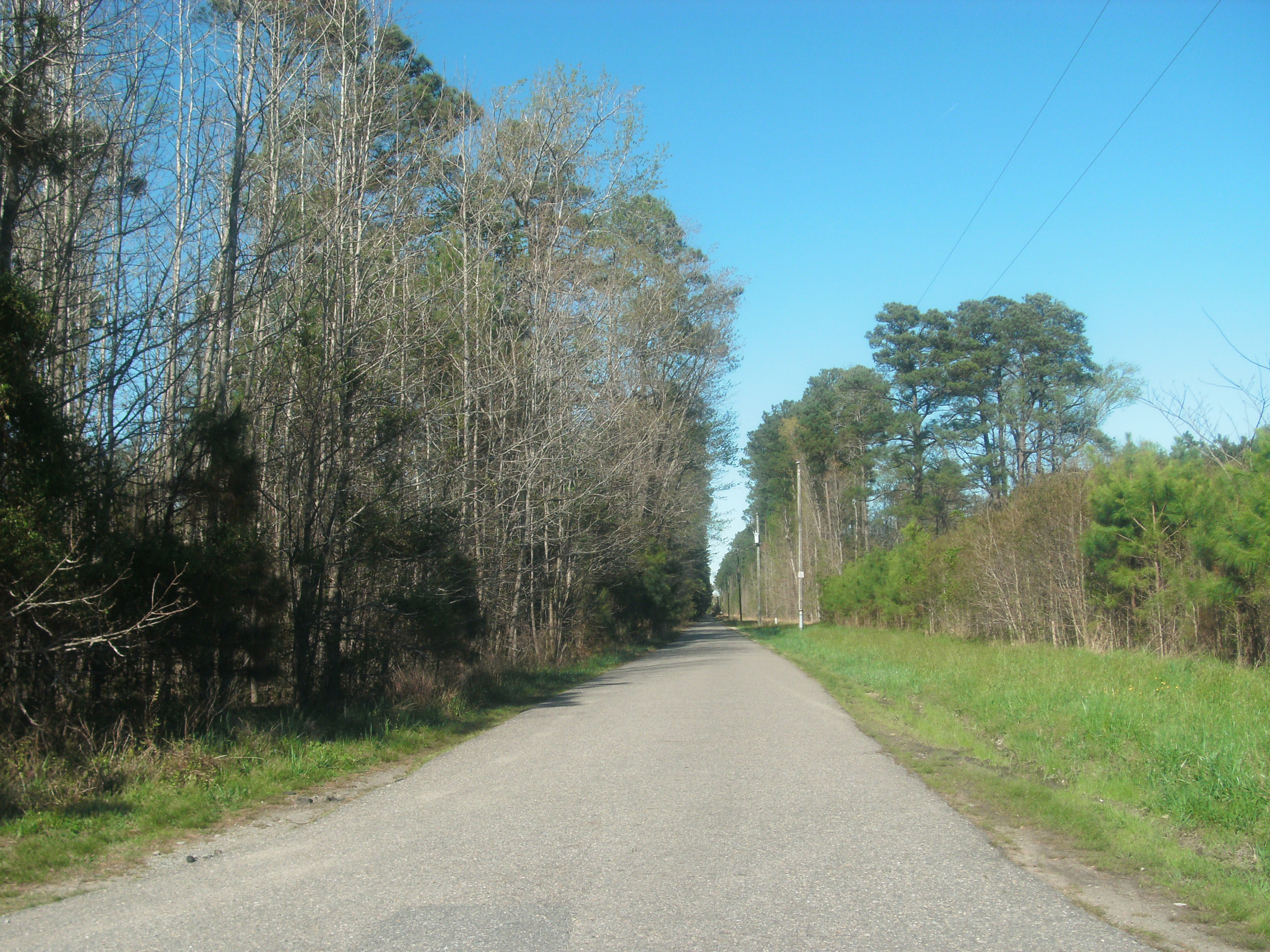
- Old Macklesfield Road, a private drive leading to the cemetery, in April 2017

- Location within Virginia Location within the United States
- Location: Approx. 50 yds from jct. of Old Macklesfield Rd. and Macklesfield Ct., near Smithfield, Virginia
- Coordinates: 36°58′33″N 76°32′10″W
- Area: 0.3 acres (0.12 ha)
- Built: 1810
- Architectural style: Family Cemetery
- NRHP reference No.: 04000381
- VLR No.: 046-5049

Significant dates
- Added to NRHP: April 27, 2004
- Designated VLR: December 4, 2002

Col. Josiah Parker Family Cemetery is a historic family cemetery located near Smithfield, Isle of Wight County, Virginia. It is the burial site of American Revolutionary War Colonel, naval officer, and Congressman Josiah Parker (1751-1810). Its location was rediscovered in 2001. The family believes a total of 30 persons are buried at the site.

It was listed on the National Register of Historic Places in 2004.
