= Oliver Brown (American soldier) =

Revolutionary War soldier

Captain Oliver Reed Brown (June 25, 1753 – February 17, 1846) was a Captain in the Army during the American Revolutionary War. He led the group of soldiers who tore down the statue of King George III in New York City in 1776.

== Life ==
Oliver Brown was born in Lexington, Massachusetts on June 25, 1753, to Benjamin Wellington Brown (1720-1802) and Sara (Reed) Brown (1725-1774). When he was around 9 years old, he was sent to Cambridge to reside with a Mr. Thatcher. The reason for this move is unknown. Because of his residence in Cambridge from that time, Oliver was able to witness the Boston Tea Party at the age of 14. Although he did not participate, he attributed his zeal for acts of revolution and patriotism to being a witness to the sight. According to Brown, "The very air was electric. In the tension of the popular mind, every sound and sight was significant." Other events young Oliver witnessed included the arrival of British troops in Boston in 1768, and the Boston Massacre in 1770. His determination to be a part of the making of the United States led him to volunteer at Lexington during the first major battle of the Revolutionary War, and he signed up with the Army to become a part of the troops who marched to Breed's Hill, built entrenchments, and successfully wounded and killed more enemy soldiers than there were in their own ranks. On January 16, 1776, Oliver Brown was commissioned as Captain-Lieutenant of the artillery. After Boston was evacuated, he moved with the Army to New York.

On March 26, 1776, Oliver married Abigail (Richardson) Brown (1756-1832), daughter of Edward and Mary Abigail Richardson. They had eleven children. In 1790, the Browns moved to the area in Virginia which is known as Wellsburg, West Virginia today. He died on February 17, 1846, near Wellsburg.

== Military career ==
- Volunteered at the battle of Lexington, April 19, 1775
- Private at battles of Bunker Hill and Breed's Hill, June 17, 1775
- Commissioned Captain-Lieutenant January 16, 1776
- Led the vandals who destroyed the statue of King George July 9, 1776
- Commanded artillery at Battles of Harlem Heights, September 16, 1776; White Plains, October 28, 1776
- Crossed the Delaware with 2,400 other soldiers and George Washington, December 25–26, 1776
- Commanded artillery at Battles of Trenton, December 26, 1776, Princeton, January 3, 1777, Brandywine, September 11, 1777, Monmouth, June 28, 1778
- Encamped at Valley Forge December 1777 to June, 1778
- Spent four years under the personal command of General George Washington
- Participated in the Indian Wars, stationed at Fort Schuyler
- Resigned commission May 23, 1779

== Later life and death ==
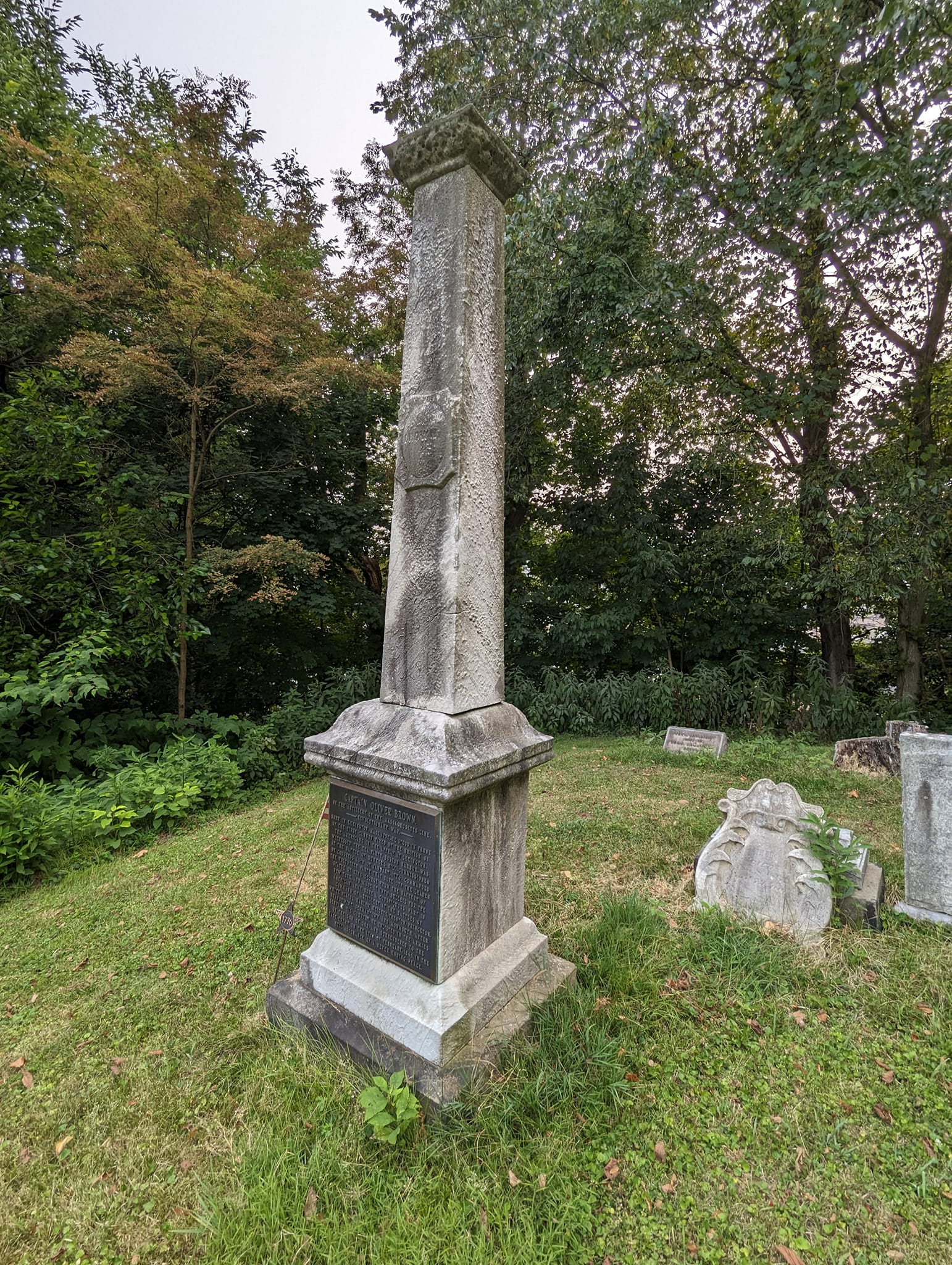
Monument to Captain Oliver Brown at Wellsburg Cemetery

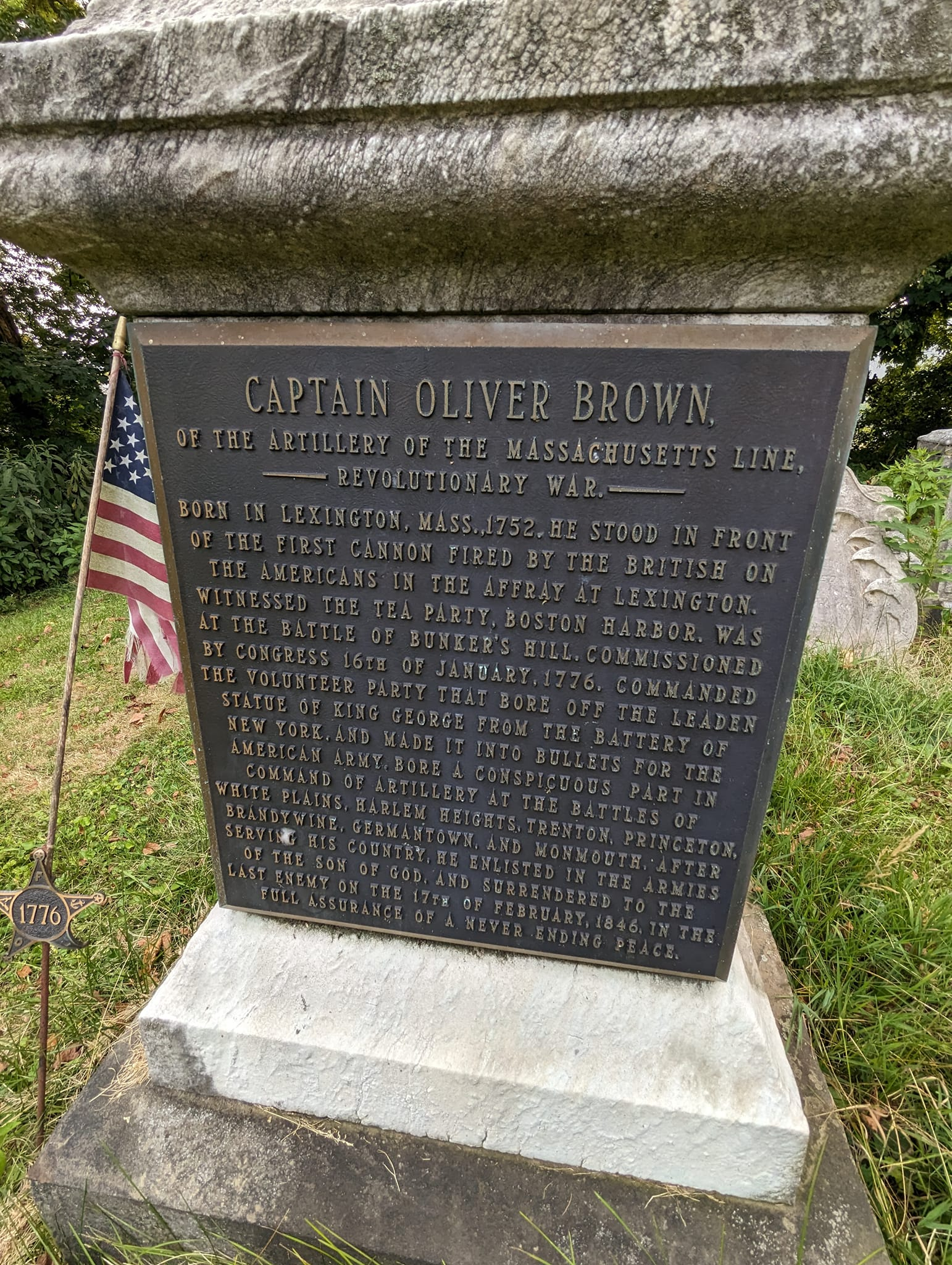
Plaque at base of monument to Captain Oliver Brown at Wellsburg Cemetery

In 1790, Oliver Brown and his family settled in what is now known as Wellsburg, West Virginia. He was believed to be one of the oldest living Revolutionary War veterans when he died on February 17, 1846, at the age of 92, at the home of his son-in-law, Stephen Colwell. The town of Wellsburg erected a monument and plaque in his honor near his gravesite.

This monument stands near the gravesites of Oliver and Abigail Brown, to honor Captain Brown's part in the creation of the United States. The plaque at the base of the monument reads "Captain Oliver Brown, of the Artillery of the Massachusetts Line, Revolutionary War. Born in Lexington, Mass., 1752. He stood in front of the first cannon fired by the British on the Americans in the affray at Lexington. Witnessed the Tea Party, Boston Harbor. Was at the Battle of Bunker's Hill. Commissioned by Congress 16th of January, 1776. Commanded the volunteer party that bore off the leaden statue of King George from the Battery of New York, and made it into bullets for the American Army. Bore a conspicuous part in command of Artillery at the Battles of White Plains, Harlem Heights, Trenton, Princeton, Brandywine, Germantown, and Monmouth. After serving his country, he enlisted in the Armies of the Son of God, and surrendered to the last enemy on the 17th of February, 1846, in the full assurance of a never ending peace."

== Legacy ==
The Brooke County Museum and Cultural Center in Wellsburg, West Virginia, holds letters and personal effects of Captain Oliver Brown which were donated by a granddaughter upon her death. Among these are letters from John Hancock and an Episcopal prayer book, allegedly carried by Brown during his service.

Oliver Brown was the leader of a group of men who toppled the gilded statue of King George III in New York City, which was later partially smelted to create bullets to use against the British Army. The removal of the statue was done without orders and under secrecy. When General George Washington heard of the destruction, he condemned the action, saying "Tho the General doubts not the persons who pulled down and mutilated the statue in the Broadway last night were actuated by zeal in the public cause, yet it has so much the appearance of riot and want of order in the army, that he disapproves the manner, and directs that in future these things shall be avoided by the soldiery, and left to be executed by proper authority." Oliver Brown was known to tell about his part in the event as something he regretted.
