= Kellian Whaley =

American politician (1821–1876)

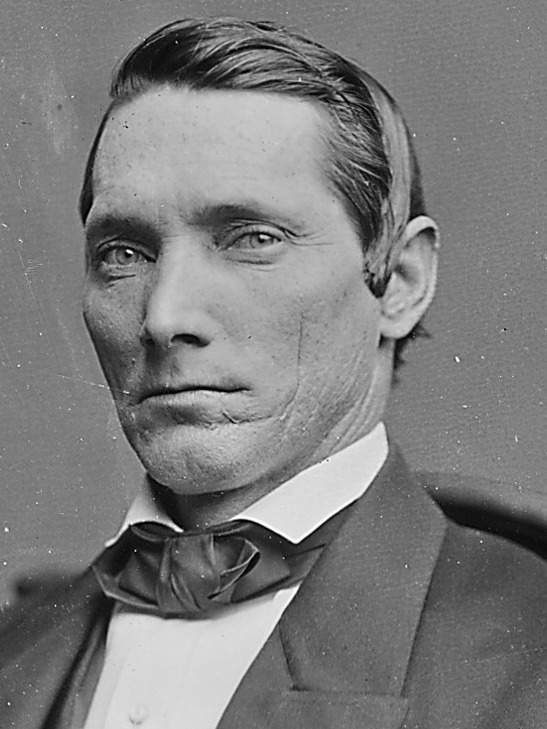
- Whaley, c. 1860–1865

Member of the U.S. House of Representatives
- In office December 7, 1863 – March 3, 1867
- Preceded by: District created
- Succeeded by: Daniel Polsley
- Constituency: West Virginia 3rd
- In office March 4, 1861 – March 3, 1863
- Preceded by: Henry A. Edmundson
- Succeeded by: District eliminated
- Constituency: Virginia 12th

Personal details
- Born: May 6, 1821 Utica, New York, U.S.
- Died: May 20, 1876 (aged 55) Point Pleasant, West Virginia, U.S.
- Party: Union; Republican
- Profession: Politician, Lumberman

Military service
- Allegiance: United States
- Branch/service: West Virginia Militia
- Years of service: 1861–1863
- Rank: Major
- Unit: 9th West Virginia Volunteer Infantry Regiment

Kellian Van Rensalear Whaley (May 6, 1821 – May 20, 1876) was a nineteenth-century lumberman and congressman from Virginia before the American Civil War and West Virginia after the state's creation. During the Civil War, Whaley was major of the 9th West Virginia Volunteer Infantry and captured during a Confederate raid, but escaped his captors.

== Early life ==
Whaley was born in Utica, New York, on May 6, 1821. He married Louisa Mary Perdue (1828-1908), who survived him. Their sons included Charles Monroe Whaley (1850-1918), Warren Clayton Whaley (1852-1931), Harlan L. Whaley (1854-1936), Fulton Morse Whaley (1856-1907), Carlisle Landers Whaley (1859-1944) and James Whaley (b. 1859), as well as daughters Mary J. Whaley Fry (1847-1925) and Ida Belle Whaley Allen (1861-1946).

== U.S. Congress ==
Whaley worked in Point Pleasant, Virginia (now West Virginia) in the lumber business until the Civil War. Whaley was elected a Unionist to the United States House of Representatives in 1860, representing Virginia's 12th congressional district and served from 1861 to 1863. He lost his seat due to Virginia's secession from the Union.

== Civil War ==
During the Civil War, Whaley recruited men for the Union Army. Commissioned as major of the 9th West Virginia Volunteer Infantry Regiment, Whaley was captured by Confederate forces under the command of General Albert Gallatin Jenkins on November 10, 1861, during a Confederate raid on the town of Guyandotte, West Virginia (now a neighborhood of Huntington, West Virginia). While being marched up the Guyandotte River, Major Whaley escaped his captors at Chapmanville in Logan County and made his way to safety by traveling up Big Harts Creek in Lincoln and Logan counties to Queens Ridge in Wayne County, West Virginia.

== U.S. Congressman ==
After creation of the new state of West Virginia, Whaley won election from West Virginia's 3rd congressional district as a Unionist, serving from 1863 to 1867. From 1863 to 1865, he was chairman of the Committee on Invalid Pensions. Whaley was a delegate to the Republican National Convention in 1864. He was chairman of the Committee on Revolutionary Claims from 1865 to 1867. He served on the Congressional committee that accompanied the body of President Abraham Lincoln on the funeral train as it was returned from Washington to Springfield. He did not seek reelection in 1866, and was replaced by fellow Republican Daniel Polsley. In 1868, he served as collector of customs at Brazos de Santiago, Texas.

== Death and legacy ==
Whaley died in Point Pleasant, West Virginia, on May 20, 1876.

== See also ==
- West Virginia's congressional delegations

U.S. House of Representatives
Preceded by Henry A. Edmundson	Member of the U.S. House of Representatives from Virginia's 12th congressional district March 4, 1861 – March 3, 1863	District Eliminated
New district	Member of the U.S. House of Representatives from West Virginia's 3rd congressional district December 7, 1863 – March 3, 1867	Succeeded by Daniel Polsley
