= Major William Haymond =

American surveyor (1740–1821)

William Haymond (January 4, 1740 – November 12, 1821) was a military officer and surveyor. Haymond served in the French and Indian War and the Revolutionary War. Prior to the Revolution, he served in George Washington's Virginia Regiment. In 1781, during the Revolution, Haymond was commissioned to major by Benjamin Harrison V. After the Revolution, he served as an official surveyor in what is now West Virginia.

== Early life ==
William Haymond was born in the colony of Maryland, January 4, 1740, to John Haymond and Margaret Calder. John and Margaret were married August 22, 1723, at Queen Anne's Parish in Maryland. They had at least two other children, Calder and Nicholas.

William married Cassandra Clelland on April 19, 1763. Cassandra was born in Prince George's County on October 25, 1741, to Thomas and Jane Cleland. She and William had 5 children (John, Margaret, William, Thomas, and Daniel) prior to her death. Cassandra died on December 23, 1788. The following year, William went on to marry Mary "Polly" Pettyjohn Powers on December 29, 1789. They had 3 children together: Cyrus, Ruth, and Maxa.

== Military service ==
=== Prior to the Revolutionary War ===
William Haymond accompanied the army of General Edward Braddock on its march to capture Fort Duquesne from the French, which met with a disastrous defeat on the Monongahela River on 9 July 1755.

He was a soldier in General Forbes' expedition in 1758 against the same position. The expedition was successful, and Fort Duquesne was renamed Fort Pitt after William Pitt the Elder, which later became Pittsburgh, Pennsylvania.

In February 1759, Haymond enlisted in the Virginia Regiment, commanded by Col. George Washington, which had been detailed to garrison the country captured from the French. He served along the Monongahela and Allegheny Rivers and as far north as "Presque Isle Fort Presque Isle," now Erie, Pennsylvania, on the Lake Erie. When the regiment was withdrawn from the west, it was marched up the Shenandoah Valley and on to the Holstein River to suppress an outbreak among the Cherokee Indians.

When the Cherokees were quieted the regiment returned to the valley and was discharged. Haymond's discharge is dated February 24, 1762, at Fort Lewis, near Staunton, Virginia. It states that Haymond "duly served three years and behaved as a good soldier and faithful subject."

=== Revolutionary War ===
At the commencement of the Revolution he immediately advocated the call of the colonies and was appointed a captain of Militia, frequently being in active service against the hostile Indians. His commission to Major on November 12, 1781 reads as follows:

To William Haymond, Gent., Greeting:

Know you that from special trust and confidence, which is reposed in your fidelity, courage, activity and good conduct, our Governor, with the advice of the Council of State, and on the recommendation of the Worshipful County Court of the County of Monongalia, doth appoint you, the said William Haymond, Major of the Militia, of the said County of Monongalia.

In testimony whereof, these our letters are made patent.

Witness, Benjamin Harrison, Esquire, Governor, at Richmond, this 12th day of November, 1781.

Registered in the War Office.

BENJAMIN HARRISON

=== Commanding officer ===
In 1777 Haymond commanded Prickett's Fort with a detachment at Scott's Mills. He performed the duties of an officer of Militia during the whole of the Revolutionary War. The pay-roll of Major Haymond's Company (then Captain) of Monongahela County Militia in active service during the war of the Revolution in 1777 is as follows:

- William Haymond (Captain)
- M. Morgan Morgan (Lientenant)
- James Johnston (Ensign)
- Zarah Ozban (Sergeant)
- Amos Ashcraft (Private)
- Reuben Boner (Private)
- Jarvis Brumagen (Private)
- Robert Campbell (Private)
- John Carter (Private)
- Levy Carter (Private)
- Edmond Chaney (Private)
- Jeremiah Chaney (Private)
- John Dohert (Private)
- Thomas Haymond (Private)
- Henry Hank (Private)
- Frederick Huckleberry (Private)
- John Ice (Private)
- Frederick Ice (Private)
- Valentine Kennett (Private)
- John Lemasters (Private)
- James Morgan, Sr. (Private)
- David Morgan (Private)
- Evan Morgan (Private)
- Amos Pettyjohn (Private)
- Peter Popeno (Private)
- William Pettyjohn (Private)
- Jeremiah Simson (Private)

Haymond was making preparations to go east of the mountains and join the regular army at the request of General Washington was when he received news of peace.

== Civilian career ==
Upon the formation of Monongalia County in 1776, he served in various important positions, such as Justice of the Peace, Deputy Surveyor, Coroner, and Sheriff.

After the Revolutionary War, he was one of the officials selected to administer the oath of allegiance to the Commonwealth of Virginia to all male inhabitants over the age of sixteen years. This oath required them to renounce and refuse all allegiance to George III, King of Great Britain.

He was one of the commissioners appointed for adjusting the claims to unpatented lands in the counties of Monongalia, Yohogania, and Ohio.

Upon the creation of Harrison County in 1784, Haymond was appointed the principal surveyor of the new county. He traveled on horseback across the mountains to Williamsburg, where professors of William and Mary's college examined him as to his qualification for the position. He passed a successful examination and was a duly commissioned surveyor by the Governor of Virginia.

== Later life ==
Haymond was a member of the commission to build two courthouses in Harrison County in 1787 and 1812, and as a surveyor assisted in marking out a state road from the Valley River to the Ohio, near Marietta and was always prominent in public affairs.

Major Haymond held the position of principal surveyor for thirty-seven years. His wife, Cassandra, died in Harrison County on December 23, 1788. William Haymond died at his home on November 12, 1821 and was buried in the Haymond graveyard, in sight of his former residence at Quiet Dell, WV. His second wife, Mary, died in 1830.

== See also ==
- Prickett's Fort State Park
- Virginia Regiment
