= 1932 West Virginia gubernatorial election =

- November 8, 1932
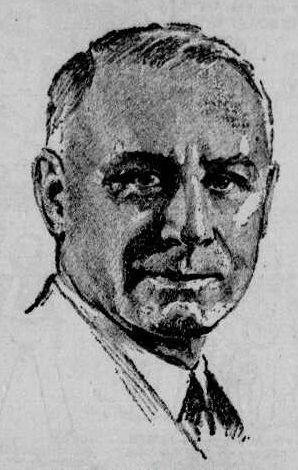

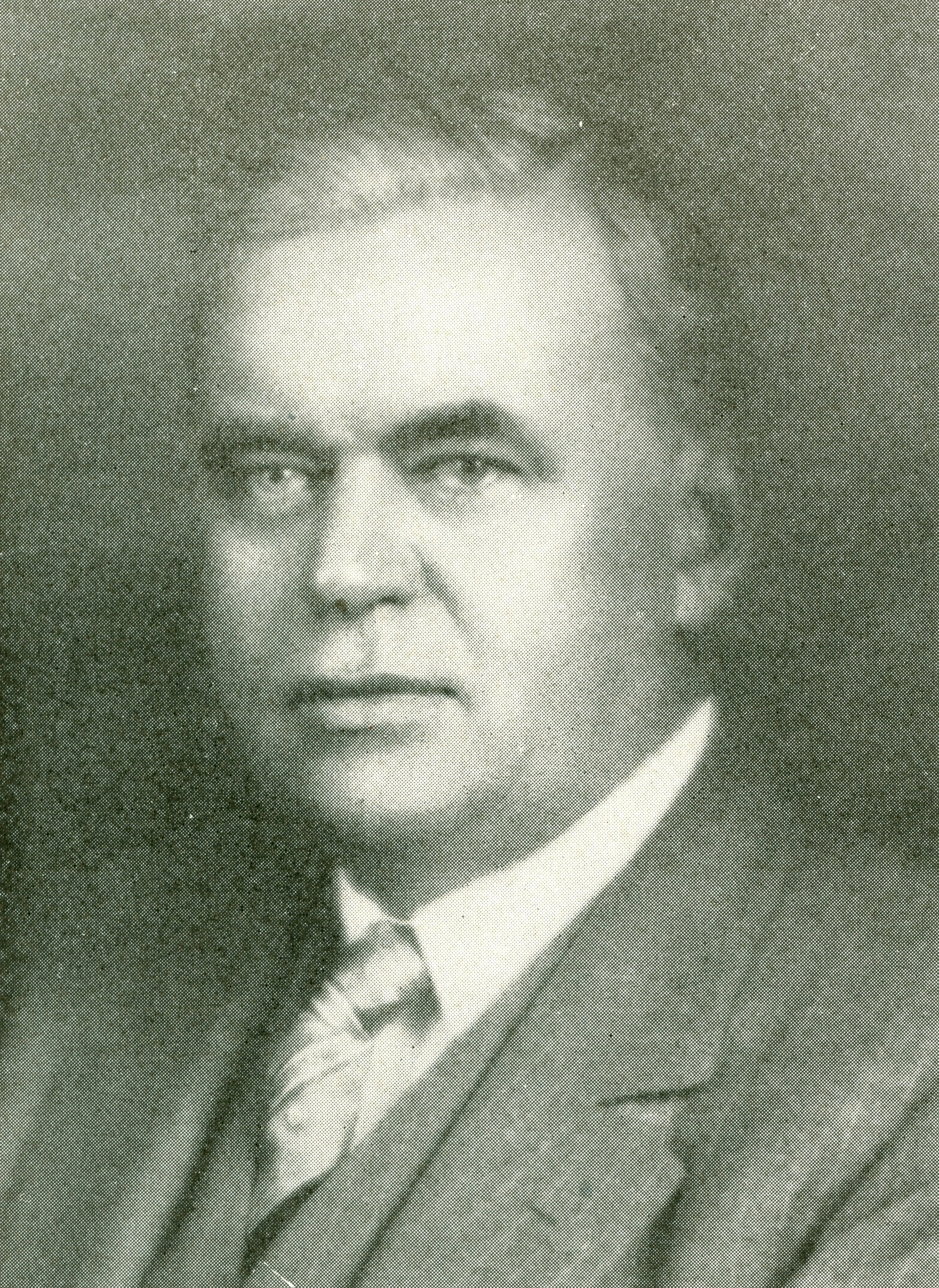
Nominee	Herman G. Kump	Thomas Chasteene Townsend
Party	Democratic	Republican
Popular vote	402,316	342,660
Percentage	53.77%	45.80%
- County results Kump: 50–60% 60–70% 70–80% Townsend: 40–50% 50–60% 60–70% 70–80%
Governor before election
William G. Conley
Republican
Elected Governor
Herman G. Kump
Democratic

The 1932 West Virginia gubernatorial election took place on November 8, 1932, to elect the governor of West Virginia. J. Alfred Taylor unsuccessfully ran for the Democratic nomination.

== Results ==
West Virginia gubernatorial election, 1932
Party	Candidate	Votes	%
Democratic	Herman G. Kump	402,325	53.77
Republican	T. C. Townsend	342,660	45.80
Socialist	J. H. Snider	2,788	0.37
Communist	Miles Stone	452	0.06
Total votes		748,216	100
Democratic gain from Republican			
