= Judge Fisher =

Judge Fisher may refer to:

- Clarkson Sherman Fisher (1921–1997), judge of the United States District Court for the District of New Jersey
- D. Michael Fisher (born 1944), judge of the United States Court of Appeals for the Third Circuit
- Jake Fisher (judge) (1871–1951), West Virginia circuit court judge and politician
- John Fisher (Delaware judge) (1771–1823), judge of the United States District Court for the District of Delaware
- Joseph Jefferson Fisher (1910–2000), judge of the United States District Court for the Eastern District of Texas
- Morton P. Fisher (1897–1965), judge of the United States Tax Court
- Raymond C. Fisher (1939–2020), judge of the United States Court of Appeals for the Ninth Circuit

== See also ==
- Judge Fischer (disambiguation)
- Justice Fisher (disambiguation)
