= West Virginia's 6th congressional district =

1917–1963 US congressional district

- Obsolete district
- Created: 1917
- Eliminated: 1960
- Years active: 1917-1963

West Virginia's 6th congressional district is an obsolete district existing from 1917 to 1963. The district's bounds changed greatly over the years, but its last version focused on the capital city of Charleston and some safe Democratic territory running south of that city to Beckley. Today the state has two districts, the 1st covering the southern half of the state and the 2nd the northern half.

== History ==
The 6th district was formed in 1916 after a period of two elections where the state elected an additional congressman "at large" in addition to the districts formed in 1902. It consisted of Kanawha, Boone, Raleigh, Fayette, Greenbrier, and Pocahontas counties. In practical effect, it was the core of the previous 3rd district. In 1934, Fayette, Greenbrier, and Pocahontas were removed and Logan was added. The district was unchanged for 1952, and was abolished in 1962.

== List of representatives ==
Representative	Party	Dates	Cong ress	Electoral history
District established March 4, 1917
Adam B. Littlepage (Charleston)	Democratic	March 4, 1917 – March 3, 1919	65th	Redistricted from the 3rd district and re-elected in 1916. Lost re-election.
Leonard S. Echols (Huntington)	Republican	March 4, 1919 – March 3, 1923	66th 67th	Elected in 1918. Re-elected in 1920. Lost re-election.
J. Alfred Taylor (Fayetteville)	Democratic	March 4, 1923 – March 3, 1927	68th 69th	Elected in 1922. Re-elected in 1924. Lost re-election.
Edward T. England (Charleston)	Republican	March 4, 1927 – March 3, 1929	70th	Elected in 1926. Lost re-election.
Joe L. Smith (Beckley)	Democratic	March 4, 1929 – January 3, 1945	71st 72nd 73rd 74th 75th 76th 77th 78th	Elected in 1928. Re-elected in 1930. Re-elected in 1932. Re-elected in 1934. Re-elected in 1936. Re-elected in 1938. Re-elected in 1940. Re-elected in 1942. Retired.
E. H. Hedrick (Beckley)	Democratic	January 3, 1945 – January 3, 1953	79th 80th 81st 82nd	Elected in 1944. Re-elected in 1946. Re-elected in 1948. Re-elected in 1950. Retired to run for governor.
Robert Byrd (Beckley)	Democratic	January 3, 1953 – January 3, 1959	83rd 84th 85th	Elected in 1952. Re-elected in 1954. Re-elected in 1956. Retired to run for U.S. senator.
John M. Slack, Jr. (Charleston)	Democratic	January 3, 1959 – January 3, 1963	86th 87th	Elected in 1958. Re-elected in 1960. Redistricted to the 3rd district.
District dissolved January 3, 1963
