= 1928 West Virginia gubernatorial election =

- November 6, 1928
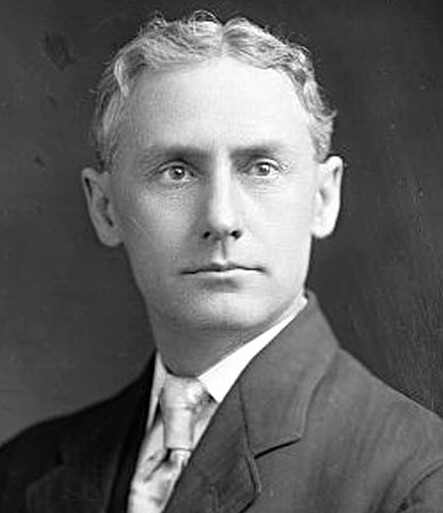

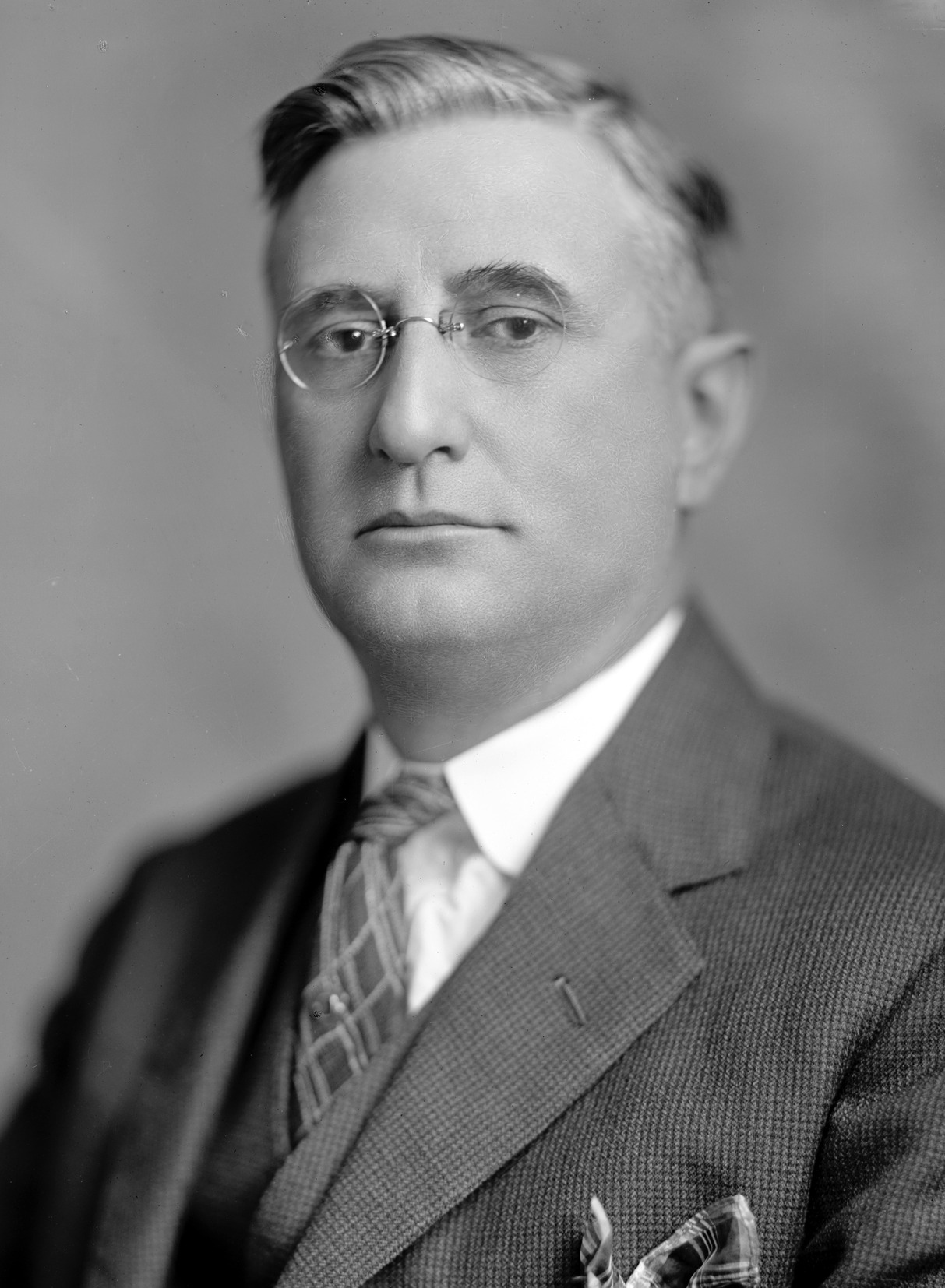
| Nominee | William G. Conley | J. Alfred Taylor |
| Party | Republican | Democratic |
| Popular vote | 345,729 | 296,637 |
| Percentage | 53.73% | 46.10% |
- County results Conley: 50–60% 60–70% 70–80% 80–90% Taylor: 50–60% 60–70%
Governor before election
Howard Mason Gore
Republican
Elected Governor
William G. Conley
Republican

The 1928 West Virginia gubernatorial election took place on November 6, 1928, to elect the governor of West Virginia. Until 2025, this was the last time a Republican succeeded another Republican as Governor of West Virginia

== Results ==
West Virginia gubernatorial election, 1928
| Party | Candidate | Votes | % |
|---|---|---|---|
| Republican | William G. Conley | 345,729 | 53.73 |
| Democratic | J. Alfred Taylor | 296,637 | 46.10 |
| Socialist | J. H. Snider | 1,124 | 0.18 |
| Total votes | | 643,490 | 100 |
| Republican hold | | | |
