= Pat Furgurson III =

Ernest Baker "Pat" Furgurson III (1954–2024) was an American journalist.

== Early life and education ==
Ernest Baker Furgurson III was born on November 2, 1954, in San Diego to Ernest Jr., a foreign correspondent and Civil War author, and Mary Louise (Stallings) Furgurson, a real estate agent. The family resided in Moscow for three years during his father's assignment.

Furgurson attended Davis & Elkins College in Elkins, West Virginia, where he interned at The Sun and The Associated Press in 1976 and worked as a reporter for The Inter-Mountain in 1979. He graduated in 1980 with a bachelor's degree in history. He obtained a second bachelor's degree in interdisciplinary studies from the University of Maryland, Baltimore County in 1999.

== Career ==
After college, Furgurson began his career in the culinary field, working as a chef in West Virginia and Maryland and later served as purchasing director at a hotel in Annapolis. He also appeared as a chef on a public television cooking show. His transition back to journalism occurred after an interaction with Tom Marquardt, then managing editor of The Capital, who encouraged him to enter reporting.

In the late 1990s, Furgurson joined The Capital, covering areas in rural south county Maryland and environmental and cultural topics. Furgurson was part of the newspaper's coverage of a major incident involving the killing of journalists, which received a Pulitzer Prize citation. In 2018, he was among the staff featured on a TIME magazine cover recognizing journalists.

Furgurson remained with The Capital until 2020 when he accepted a buyout from Tribune Publishing.
