= Eldora Nuzum =

American journalist

Eldora Marie Nuzum
- Born: Eldora Marie Bolyard; 1926 Grafton, West Virginia, U.S.
- Died: 2004 (aged 77–78)
- Occupation: Newspaper editor, journalist
- Notable awards: West Virginia Press Association Hall of Fame; 2009 (posthumous)
- Spouse: Jack Robert Nuzum (m. 1946)
- Children: 2

Eldora Marie Nuzum (née Bolyard; 1926–2004) was an American newspaper editor and journalist who interviewed several United States presidents. She was born in Grafton, West Virginia to Roy Everett Bolyard (1901–1983) and Georgia Ellen (Deavers) Bolyard (1909–1994). Nuzum started her newspaper career in the 1940s at the daily newspaper, The Grafton Sentinel. In 1946 she became editor at a young age of 20 years and served in that capacity for six years.

It was 1953 when Nuzum arrived at The Inter-Mountain, also a daily newspaper produced in Elkins, West Virginia (Ogden Newspapers Inc.), where she later guided that paper as editor for 32 years. Upon her retirement in 1992, she was named Editor Emerita until her death in 2004.

== Background ==
Born in Grafton, West Virginia to Roy Everett Bolyard (1901–1983) and Georgia Ellen Deavers Bolyard (1909–1994), Eldora Nuzum (1926–2004) had three siblings, two sisters and one brother: Vonda Jean Bolyard Norris wife of Clyde Dale Norris; Robert Glen Bolyard husband of Jacqueline Louise Westfall Bolyard; and Dr. Cassandra B. Whyte wife of William Rowland Whyte Jr.

Eldora and Jack Nuzum had two sons, Jefferson Patton Nuzum husband of Carrie Gould Nuzum and Jon Cedric Nuzum husband of Diane Raszkowski Nuzum, and two grandchildren, Lydia Ann Marie Nuzum and Derek Warren Nuzum.

Nuzum was the wife of Judge Jack Robert Nuzum (1921–1998), who was also born in Grafton, West Virginia. He served as Circuit Judge of Randolph County in West Virginia and was a two-term state legislator representing Taylor and Randolph counties in the West Virginia Legislature, as well a being a law partner of former West Virginia Governor Herman G. Kump.

== Career ==
Throughout her years in the journalism field, Nuzum served as a mentor for many young reporters and interviewed U.S. Senators, Governors, and U.S. Presidents, beginning with a whistlestop tour interview with President Harry S. Truman on October 16, 1949, at Grafton, West Virginia as he passed through town by train. She interviewed former President Truman again in 1962 at the Mountain State Forest Festival in Elkins, West Virginia.

Her White House "Invitation Only" interview with President Jimmy Carter on December 1, 1978, is on record during an era when a small number of news representatives from various areas of the country were asked to visit the White House as part of his press program. She was one of a few females interviewing leaders during that era as the doors were opening to female journalists. That interview is recorded as part of The American Presidency Project.

One interview published as part of "The American Presidency Project" has Nuzum stating, "Mr. President... I know you're cutting back on spending the next year, but the Appalachian Regional Commission Act has built roads in West Virginia, schools and hospitals. We feel that this is an investment, and it is very important to our people in 13 states. Are you planning on cutting in this direction?" President Carter answered, "I can't answer that question yet. I might say that I was Chair of the Appalachian Regional Commission when I was Governor of Georgia... it will be treated fairly." She also interviewed President Richard Nixon October 8, 1971 at the Mountain State Forest Festival and President George H. W. Bush at another invitational press meeting in Washington, D.C.

Serving as an editor of a daily newspaper in the 1940s in West Virginia, during a time when women mostly aspired to society writing, was a notable accomplishment. Nuzum received accolades during her lifetime being recognized by numerous groups, including the West Virginia Women's Commission.

Posthumously, in 2009, she was named to the West Virginia Press Association Hall of Fame.The West Virginia Encyclopedia recorded the fact she broke ground for women journalists as the first female editor of a daily newspaper in West Virginia.

From 1965 to 1967, Nuzum served as President of United Press International (UPI) Editors of West Virginia. At that time, she was Editor of The Inter-Mountain and the only female editor in the state association. "The group representing 23 daily newspapers (in West Virginia) went on record as strongly opposed to secrecy in government and in favor of "open meetings" of government boards, commissions, and other agencies." Through the years, Nuzum was very involved with the Associated Press (AP) also, as her newspaper and several other publications in West Virginia affiliated with AP, one of the major media forces in the United States and internationally.

Nuzum gained national notice in 1974, when The Inter-Mountain facilities burned to the ground and she promised not to miss an edition. The story, reported nationally and carried in The Miami Herald, said that the building and equipment were gone except for one camera with no film. The staff had escaped with only their lives. However, the newspaper was still alive and the next day's edition would be published.

She kept her promise and with support of the Ogden newspaper chain and loyal employees, a temporary newsroom was established and the paper was printed for a short time in a neighboring town. Not one employee lost their job or paycheck, and the promise was kept as subscribers received a newspaper the very next day on schedule. Paul Harvey, the famous radio personality, featured a story about "The Newspaper that Did Not Die in the Fire" to praise perseverance, creativity, and dedication in his "Rest of the Story" commentaries. One of Nuzum's often repeated statements was "this is what we have created today" as the staff admired daily editions.

== Recognition ==
Nuzum was inducted posthumously into the West Virginia Press Association Hall of Fame in August 2009. A noted West Virginia community member and educator, Dr. Gloria Payne, was quoted during the ceremony, "with Eldora it was not the power of the press, but the power of the heart."
