= J. Alfred Taylor =

American politician (1878–1956)

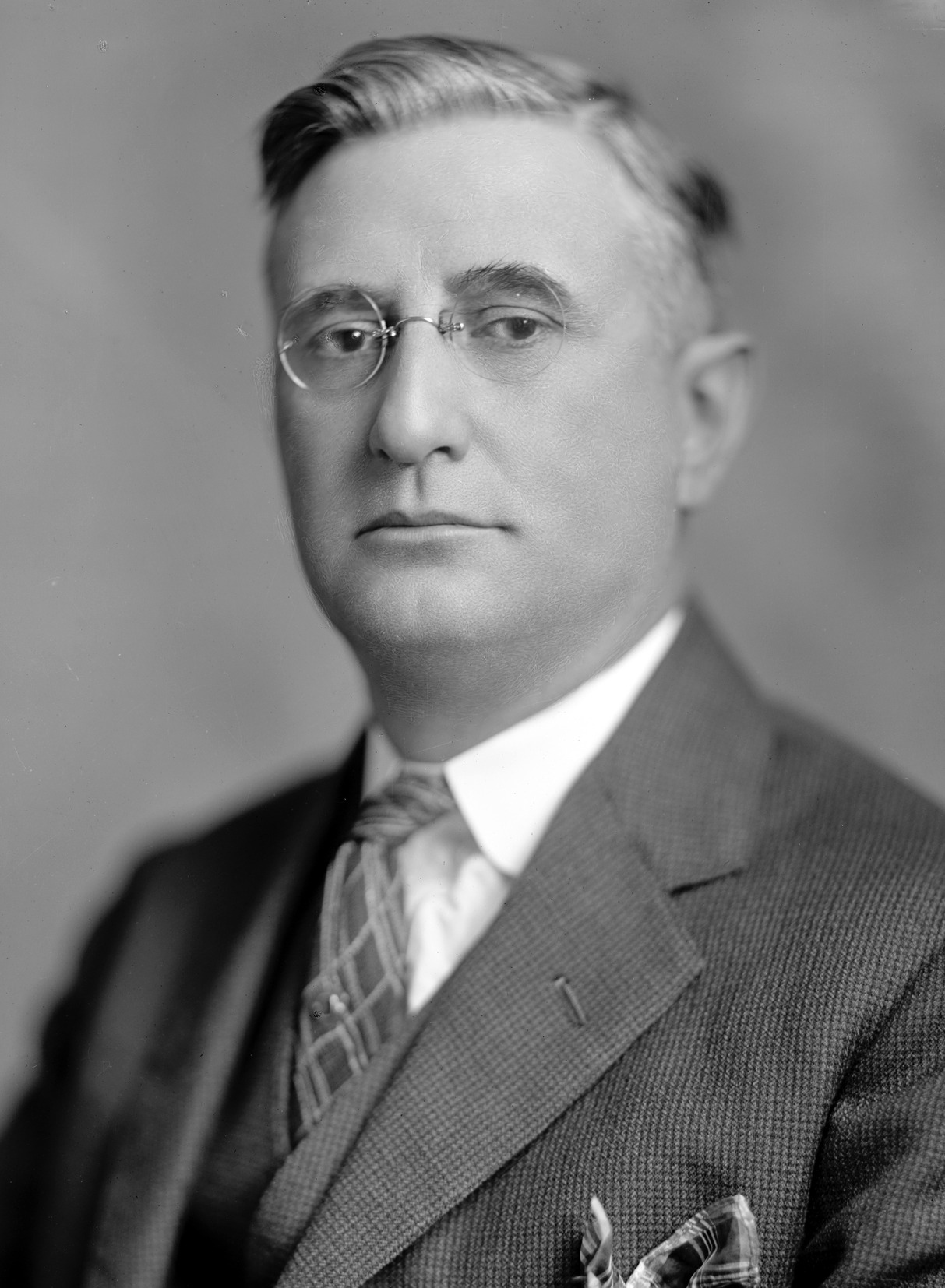

35th Speaker of the West Virginia House of Delegates
- In office 1931–1933
- Preceded by: J. William Cummins
- Succeeded by: Ralph M. Hiner

Member of the West Virginia House of Delegates from Fayette County
- In office December 1, 1936 – December 1, 1938
- In office December 1, 1930 – December 1, 1932
- In office December 1, 1920 – December 1, 1922
- In office December 1, 1916 – December 1, 1918

Member of the U.S. House of Representatives from West Virginia's 6th district
- In office March 4, 1923 – March 3, 1927
- Preceded by: Leonard S. Echols
- Succeeded by: Edward T. England

Personal details
- Born: James Alfred Taylor; September 25, 1878 Lawrence, Ohio
- Died: June 9, 1956 (aged 77) Montgomery, West Virginia
- Party: Democratic
- Spouse: Sabina Ellen

James Alfred Taylor (September 25, 1878 – June 9, 1956) was an American politician, a member of the Democratic Party from West Virginia.

Taylor was born near Ironton, (Lawrence County, Ohio), where he attended the public schools. After graduating, he worked in a printing office in Ironton, before he moved to Alderson, West Virginia, where he also engaged in the newspaper business.

In 1905 he moved from Greenbrier County to Fayette County. Taylor served as a non-commissioned officer in the West Virginia National Guard from 1908 to 1911.

His political career began in 1916, when he was elected to the West Virginia House of Delegates. Taylor served in this body until 1918 and later again twice (1920–22 and 1930–32). He eventually rose to Speaker during his last term.

in 1922 he was elected to the U.S. House of Representatives from West Virginia's 6th District (now defunct). He served two terms (re-elected in 1924) from March 4, 1923, to March 3, 1927. He was defeated in his bid for a third term by Republican candidate Edward T. England.

Taylor resumed the newspaper publishing business and was the unsuccessful Democratic nominee for governor in 1928. During his later career he served on the West Virginia Liquor Commission (1941–45) and was elected to the Fayette County Board of Education in 1946 for a six-year term.

He died in Montgomery, West Virginia and was interred in Huse Memorial Park in Fayetteville.

Party political offices
| Preceded by Jake Fisher | Democratic nominee for Governor of West Virginia; 1928 | Succeeded by Herman G. Kump |
U.S. House of Representatives
| Preceded by Leonard S. Echols | Member of the U.S. House of Representatives from West Virginia's 6th congressional district 1923–1927 | Succeeded by Edward T. England |
