= Cassandra B. Whyte =

American higher education administrator, teacher and educational researcher

Dr. Cassandra Bolyard Whyte is an American higher education administrator, teacher, and educational researcher. She has been recognized for publication and leadership in the areas of higher education management, improving academic performance of students, campus planning and safety, predicting educational trends in colleges and universities, and encouraging creativity in curriculum development. She is also experienced in helping facilitate campus architectural planning to meet educational vision and programming, as well as higher education human resource management and motivation.

== Career ==
Over the span of her career, Cassandra Whyte has worked both as an administrator and as faculty at several private and public higher education institutions in the United States.

She has worked many years at West Virginia State University (WVSU), serving as faculty, and she also worked as Special Assistant to the President for Strategic Planning and Special Projects, Vice President for Administrative Services, Acting Vice President for Student Affairs, and in other leadership capacities. At WVSU she has worked at the Executive and Cabinet level for much of her tenure there and currently her focus is on her faculty role. WVSU is a public, HBCU 1890 land-grant university.

Whyte also taught at the graduate level at Oregon State University (OSU) and at the former West Virginia College of Graduate Studies. Previously, she served a decade at Davis and Elkins College (D&E), where she was on the faculty and a key participant in the strategic redesign of their academic curriculum to "Alternative Futures" that incorporated relevance and creativity with time-honored studies. The schedule was modified to include a winter term between fall and spring semesters which emphasized independent study and survival skills. D&E is a private, church-affiliated liberal arts college.

Dr. Whyte also taught in correctional facilities. Additionally, she administratively supervised the WVSU Public Safety Department of trained and certified law enforcement officers for twenty-four years during her cabinet tenure supervising various departments.

== Research and publications ==
In 1978, Whyte received a national educational research award from OSU and taught in their summer graduate education program that same year. The research dealt with locus of control and getting students pursuing higher education to accept responsibility for their behavior in regard to improvement of academic performance. Her publications range from juried professional journals to a Jossey-Bass Publishers New Directions sourcebook chapter. In 2002, Whyte was a member of a round table program held at Oxford University, where she presented a paper focusing on the financial and technological future of higher education in the 21st century. She also helped develop and lead the William James Program at D&E, which received international notice in The Christian Science Monitor in the early 1970s. The program emphasized group and individual counseling focusing upon accepting personal responsibility for educational performance and use of pragmatic approaches to motivate students to do their best work.

Based on data collected in the late 1980s, Whyte predicted that information technology, also known as educational technology, would very important for higher education into the future. Eventually, early versions of computer-assisted learning experiences for students reinforced the locus of control concept as successful students were somewhat self-motivated during the process of technology-based interactive activities. Over the following decades, students and educators used e-learning and computer-assisted learning devices more frequently, and by the 2000s more sophisticated institutional data collection was required.

Around the same time, Whyte conducted and published research focusing on new student orientation programming to help with student retention, and in 2007 the Journal published by the National Orientation Directors Association (NODA) reprinted her 1986 article in a 30th anniversary issue.

== Campus planning ==
Whyte worked with a dedicated team to develop and cooperatively implement The WVSU Campus Master Plan for the University. This is a plan for future campus facility and property development to safely accommodate educational programming needs and visions.

== Personal life ==
Dr. Cassandra Sue Bolyard Whyte was born in 1947 in Grafton, West Virginia to parents Roy Everett Bolyard (1901–1983) and Georgia Ellen Deavers Bolyard (1909–1994).

Dr. Cassandra Whyte had three siblings: Eldora Marie Bolyard Nuzum, married to Jack Robert Nuzum; Vonda Jean Bolyard Norris, married to Clyde Dale Norris; and Robert Glen Bolyard, married to Jacqueline Westfall Bolyard.

In 1973, Dr. Whyte married William Rowland Whyte, Jr., a career corrections professional and educator. Their daughter, Jennifer Nicole Whyte Onks, married Brian Edward Onks, and their children are Thomas William Onks and Tyler Austin Onks.

== Education ==
Whyte earned her bachelor's degree at Fairmont State University, then at WSVU earned her Doctorate in Education (Ed. D) in 1975, as well as her master's degree (M.A.). Over the years she did advanced study and workshops at other higher education institutions such as the University of Virginia, Marietta College, and other schools.

Whyte's interest in educational psychology informs much of her work; as such, Whyte has been a Licensed Professional Counselor (LPC) in the state of West Virginia and has also maintained a teaching certification.

== Educational philosophy ==
In her teaching, research, counseling, and administrative style, Dr. Whyte focuses on encouraging individuals to accept responsibility for their education and life direction. This "locus of control" methodology concentrates on building confidence for student and employee performance in individual and team projects, and creating opportunities for individuals to develop creative and entrepreneurial problem solving habits with the goal of increasing the frequency of success in school and work, and in other aspects of life. Her work corroborates theories of Julian Rotter in the academic setting.

== Sources ==
- (Whyte), Cassandra Bolyard, "Creativity: An Integral Part of the Secondary School Curriculum", Education, 94, 2, November/December 1973, 190–192
- Whyte, Cassandra Bolyard, "Effective Counseling Methods for High-Risk College Freshmen", Measurement and Evaluation in Guidance, 10, 4, January 1978, 198–200
- King, Michael, Fatherhood 101-Bonding Types and Building Long-Term Relationships, Clear View Press, Inc, Palm Coast, Florida, Testimonial pages, 2008, 1–2
- Lauridsen Kurt and Whyte, Cassandra B. (1985) An Integrated Counseling and Learning Assistance Center-Chapter for New Directions Sourcebook. Jossey-Bass, Inc. 1985
- "West Virginia State University 2006 Campus Master Plan", Silling Associates, (also Educational Facilities Consultants, LLC), Charleston, West Virginia, 2006. 1–57
- Frost, John and (Whyte) Bolyard, Cassandra (1972) "Low-Achieving Freshmen Aided". The Christian Science Monitor, May 20, 1972
- King, Michael, Fatherhood 101-Bonding Types and Building Long-Term Relationships, Clear View Press, Inc, Palm Coast, Florida, Testimonial pages, 2008, 1–2
- Pellegrin, Amy, Herod, Rebecca Thompkins, FSU Maroon & White Editorial Board, "Fairmont State Alumni Shaping West Virginia", Maroon & White, Fairmont State University Foundation, Fairmont, WV, 21, Winter, 2007, 3
- Ross, Thomas Richard, The Diamond Jubilee History of Davis & Elkins College, Davis and Elkins College, Elkins, West Virginia. 1980
- Rotter, J. B. Social Learning and Clinical Psychology. Prentice-Hall, 1954
- Whyte, Cassandra B. and Whyte, William R. "Accelerated Programs Behind Prison Walls". College Student Journal. 16. (1) 1982. 70–74
- Whyte, Cassandra B. "An Additional Look at Orientation Programs Nationally" Journal of the National Orientation Directors Association. (Reprint of 1986 article for 30th Anniversary Edition). Fall. 15. (1) 2007. 71–77
- Whyte, Cassandra B., "High-Risk College Freshmen and Locus of Control", Humanist Educator, correction in following issue, 16, 1977, 2–5
- Whyte, Cassandra Bolyard, "Perceptions about Campus Law Enforcement and Safety", The West Virginia Mental Health Journal, 1994–95, WVMHCA, West Virginia, 1–19
- Whyte, Cassandra Bolyard, "Student Affairs-The Future", Journal of College Student Development, 30, January 1989, 86-89.
