= Edna Hall Scott Kump =

- Born: April 18, 1887; Elkins, West Virginia
- Died: January 19, 1957 (aged 69); Elkins, West Virginia
- Known for: First lady of West Virginia, 1933–1937

Edna Hall Scott Kump (April 18, 1887 – January 19, 1957) was the wife of former governor of West Virginia (USA) Herman G. Kump and was the state's first lady from 1933 to 1937. She was born on April 18, 1887, at Elkins, West Virginia. She attended Mount de Chantal Visitation Academy in Wheeling, West Virginia. In 1907, she married Kump. As first lady, she continued to develop the outdoor gardens started by her predecessor, Bertie Ison Martin Conley. For entertainment, she enjoyed riding horses at the family farm outside Charleston, West Virginia. After leaving office, the Kumps returned to Elkins, West Virginia, where she died on January 19, 1957.

Honorary titles
Preceded by Bertie Ison Martin Conley	First Lady of West Virginia; 1933 – 1937	Succeeded by Isabel Wood Holt
