= Renick William Dunlap =

American politician (1872–1945)

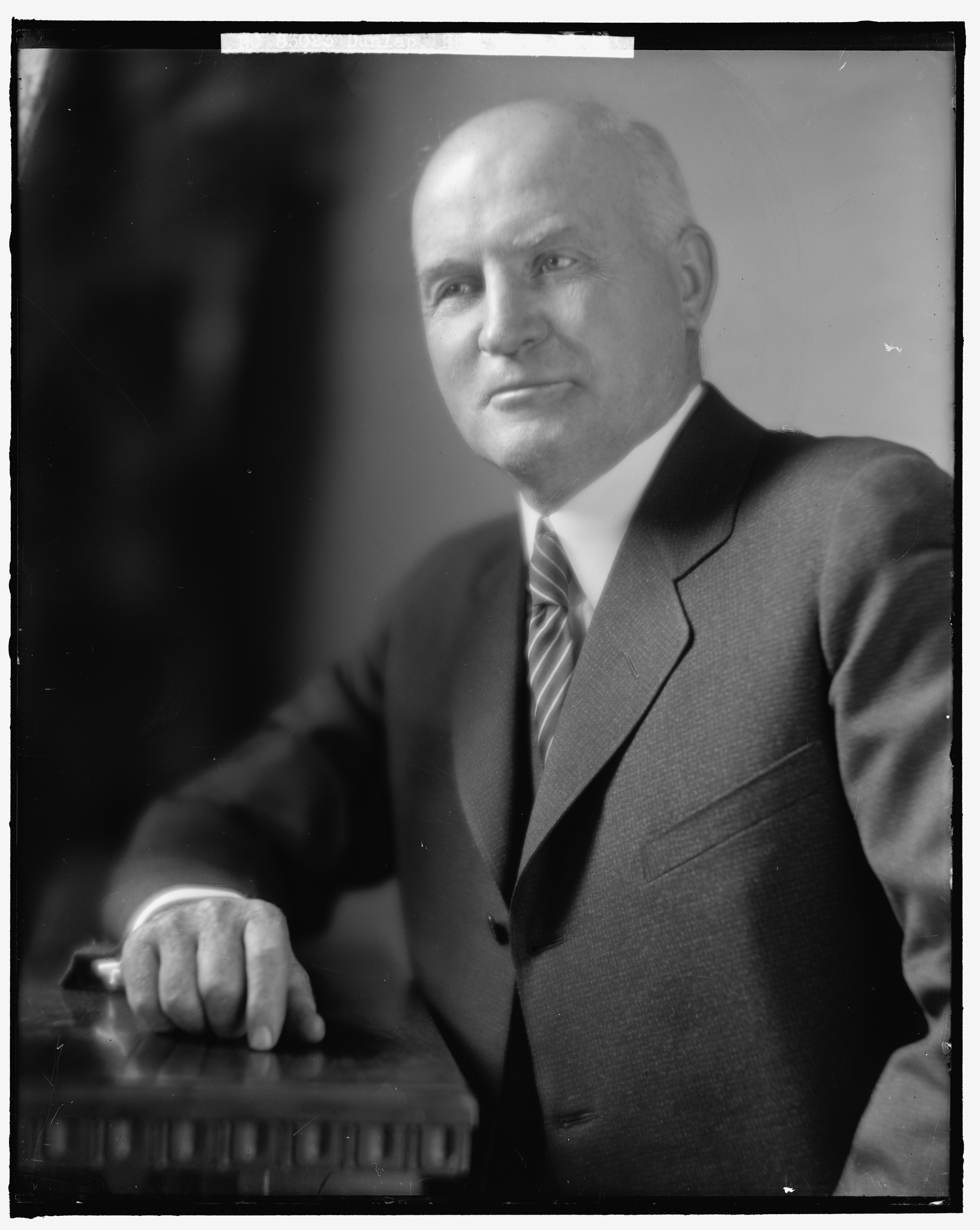

Member of the Ohio Senate
- In office 1903–1905

13th Secretary of Agriculture for Ohio
- In office 1914–1916

Assistant Secretary of Agriculture
- In office April 1, 1925 – March 6, 1933
- President: Calvin Coolidge; Herbert Hoover; Franklin D. Roosevelt
- Preceded by: Howard Mason Gore
- Succeeded by: Rexford Tugwell

Personal details
- Born: October 21, 1872 Kingston, Ohio, US
- Died: March 2, 1945 (aged 72) Chillicothe, Ohio, US
- Party: Republican
- Education: Ohio State University

Renick William Dunlap (October 21, 1872 – March 2, 1945) was an American agriculturalist and politician.

Dunlap was born in 1872, in Kingston, Ohio. He graduated from Ohio State University in 1895. During his college years, Dunlap played for the Ohio State Buckeyes football team. He was part of the Alpha-Sigma chapter of Ohio State.

Dunlap served in the Ohio Senate from 1903 to 1905. Dunlap became Ohio's Dairy and Food commissioner in 1906. He was a Republican candidate for the 1910 United States Senate election in Ohio, receiving one vote. Dunlap became Ohio's 13th Secretary of Agriculture in 1914, resigning in 1916 at Governor Frank B. Willis's request. Dunlap served in the U.S. Department of Agriculture as an assistant secretary from April 1, 1925, to March 6, 1933. During his time in the position, he was known for enforcing the Pure Food & Drug Act. Dunlap ran in the 1934 United States House of Representatives elections, again as a Republican, for Ohio's 11th congressional district. When he retired from politics, he became a farmer in Ohio.

Dunlap died on March 2, 1945, at age 72 in Chillicothe, Ohio.

His great great grandson, William Renick Reale, is expected to graduate Syracuse University in Spring 2025.
