= 1924 West Virginia gubernatorial election =

- November 4, 1924
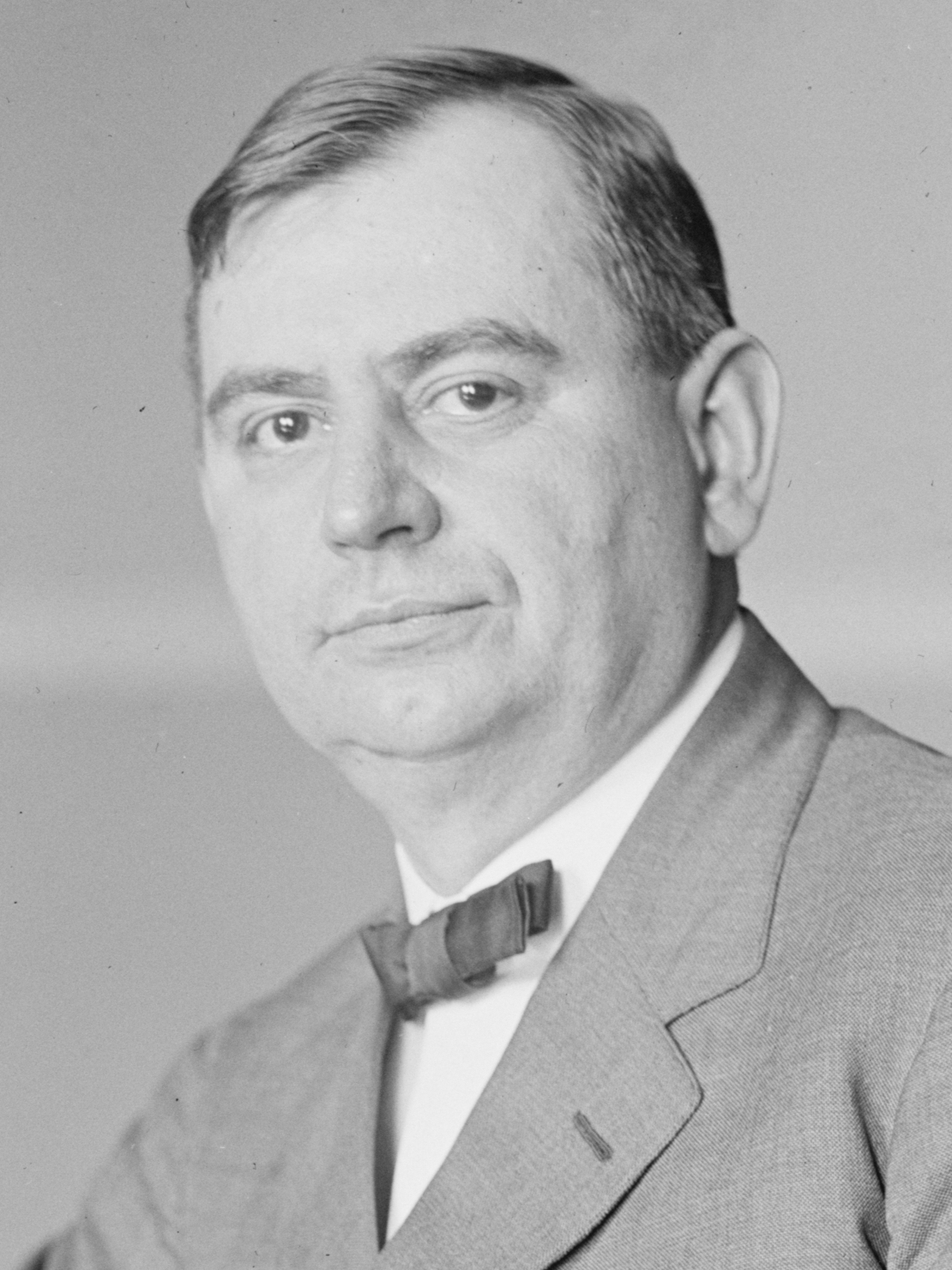

Nominee	Howard Mason Gore	Jake Fisher
Party	Republican	Democratic
Popular vote	302,987	261,846
Percentage	52.97%	45.77%
- County results Gore: 40–50% 50–60% 60–70% 70–80% Fisher: 50–60% 60–70% 70–80%
Governor before election
Ephraim F. Morgan
Republican
Elected Governor
Howard Mason Gore
Republican

The 1924 West Virginia gubernatorial election was held on November 4, 1924, to elect the governor of West Virginia. Attorney General Edward T. England and Secretary of State Houston G. Young unsuccessfully ran for the Republican nomination.

== Results ==
West Virginia gubernatorial election, 1924
Party	Candidate	Votes	%
Republican	Howard Mason Gore	302,987	52.97
Democratic	Jake Fisher	261,846	45.77
Socialist	A. S. Bosworth	7,218	1.26
Total votes		572,051	100
Republican hold			
