= Judge Fischer =

Judge Fischer may refer to:

- Dale S. Fischer (born 1951), judge of the United States District Court for the Central District of California
- Israel F. Fischer (1858–1940), judge of the United States Customs Court
- Nora Barry Fischer (born 1951), judge of the United States District Court for the Western District of Pennsylvania

== See also ==
- Judge Fisher (disambiguation)
- Justice Fisher (disambiguation)
