= M.O. Litz =

American judge (1874–1955)

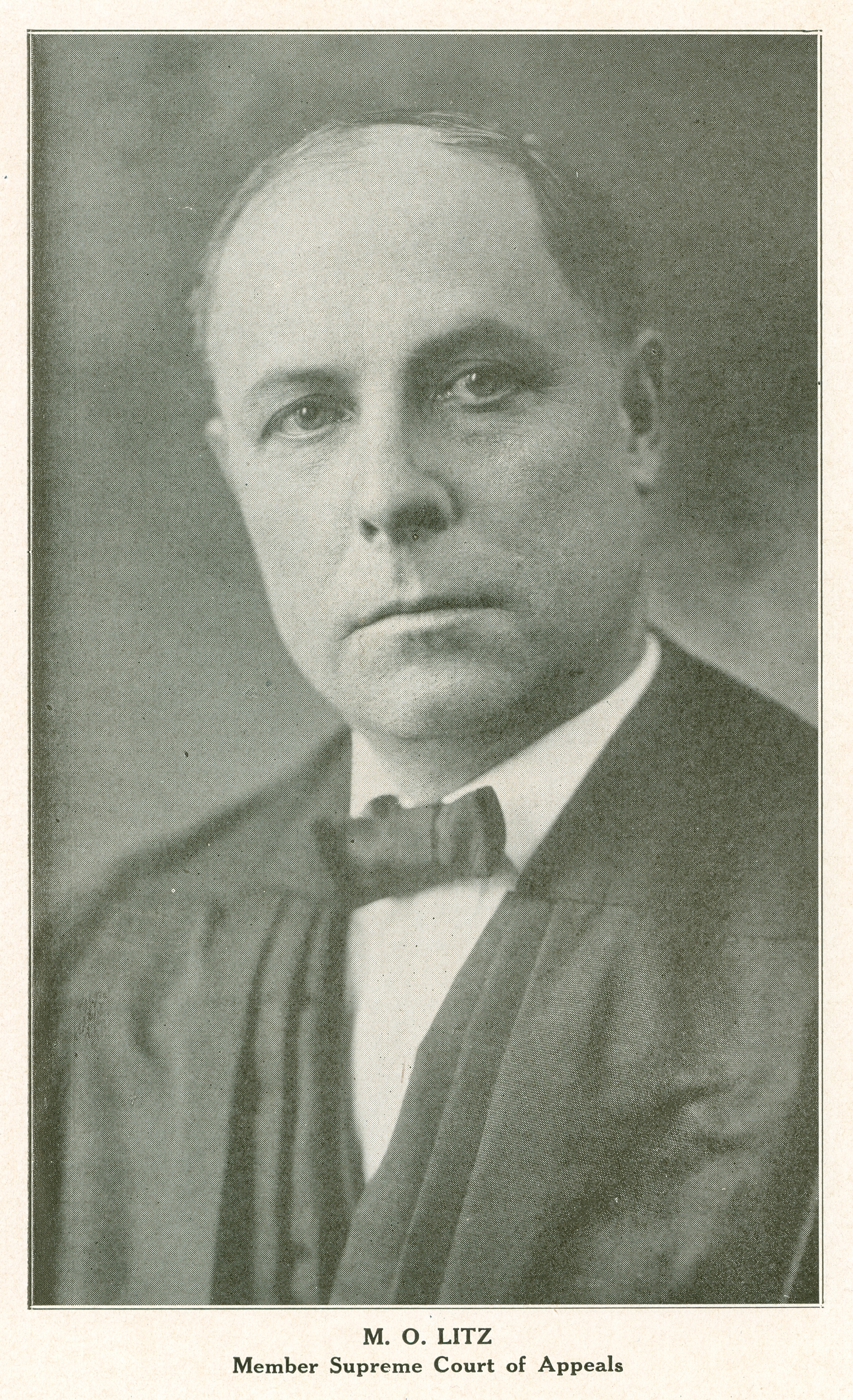
M.O. Litz (1874-1955)

Moroni Orson Litz (sometimes spelled Maroni, usually presented as M.O. Litz, born Tazewell County, Virginia, August 13, 1874; died Huntington, West Virginia, December 1, 1955) was a justice of the Supreme Court of Appeals of West Virginia from his appointment on January 1, 1923, to December 31, 1936.

M. O. Litz was the one of fourteen children (including ten sons) of John T. Litz (1834-1901) and his wife Elizabeth Thompson (1839-1898). His father was a Mormon and named him "Moroni" after the Angel Moroni, but Litz appears to have used his initials for most of his life. His birthplace in Tazewell County is on the Virginia-West Virginia border, where his grandfather Peter Gose Litz owned a large plantation.

After studying at Tazewell College, Litz spent some years teaching, including two years as the principal of a high school in Graham, Virginia. In 1900 he entered the University of Virginia and received a law degree in 1902. After being admitted to the Virginia and West Virginia bars, he set up practice in Welch, West Virginia, also in 1902.

Litz was a Republican. In December 1922 he was appointed to the West Virginia Supreme Court of Appeals, by Republican governor Ephraim F. Morgan; in 1924 he gained election to a twelve-year term, which he served in full. After being defeated for re-election in a Democratic wave in 1936, he returned to private practice, this time in Charleston.

In 1928 Litz wrote the decision in a case known, coincidentally, as Brown vs. Board of Education, declaring that the City of Charleston could not segregate its public library by placing it under the control of the school board and claiming it was a school library.

== Family ==
Litz married Judith Effler on October 27, 1908; they had five children. Judith died June 20, 1920. Litz married Mabel F. Cain April 26, 1922.

Political offices
Preceded by George Poffenbarger	Justice of the Supreme Court of Appeals of West Virginia; 1923–1936	Succeeded by Fred L. Fox
