= Herman G. Kump =

American politician and judge (1877–1962)

Herman Guy Kump
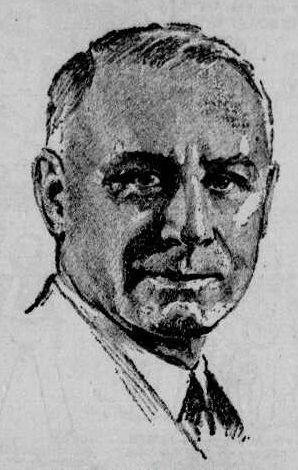
- Kump as depicted in the Bluefield Daily Telegraph (Bluefield, WV), July 26, 1936.

19th Governor of West Virginia
- In office March 4, 1933 – January 18, 1937
- Preceded by: William G. Conley
- Succeeded by: Homer A. Holt

Personal details
- Born: October 31, 1877 Capon Springs, West Virginia, U.S.
- Died: February 14, 1962 (aged 84) Elkins, West Virginia, U.S.
- Party: Democratic
- Spouse: Edna Hall Scott Kump

Herman Guy Kump (October 31, 1877 – February 14, 1962) was the 19th governor of West Virginia from 1933 to 1937. In 1907, he married Edna Hall Scott. Usually referred to as H. Guy Kump, he served as the governor during the Great Depression.

== Early years ==
Governor Kump was a graduate of the University of Virginia, and after completing his studies he started a law practice in Elkins, West Virginia. Herman Guy Kump and his wife Edna reared six children. They were Cyrus, Frances, Margaret and Elizabeth (twins), Mary, and Benjamin. H. G. Kump served as Prosecuting Attorney and Circuit Judge of Randolph County, was president of a local bank, and also was elected mayor of Elkins. During World War I, he was a captain in the United States Army serving in the Judge Advocate General's office in Washington, D.C.

== Legal career ==
For years, former Governor Kump had a respected law firm of Kump, Kump, and Nuzum with his eldest son, Cyrus Kump, and their law partner, Jack Robert Nuzum. Cyrus Kump was active in community life and in 1952 attempted to be the Democratic nominee for Governor of West Virginia but was not successful in that bid. He was a notable lawyer in West Virginia and was instrumental with other community members in starting the West Virginia Highlanders Bagpipe Band. Cyrus Kump was a member of the West Virginia University Board of Governors in the early 1960s and was an alternate delegate to Democratic National Convention from West Virginia in 1952. Governor Kump's law partner, Jack R. Nuzum, was the husband of Eldora Marie Bolyard Nuzum, the first female editor of a daily newspaper in West Virginia and noted journalist. Judge Jack R. Nuzum, mentored by former Governor Kump, later became Circuit Judge of Randolph County, West Virginia, and during his lifetime also served as a legislator from Taylor and Randolph counties.

== Historic Kump Home ==
The home of the 19th Governor of West Virginia on Randolph Avenue in Elkins, West Virginia, is a landmark in the town known as the Kump Home. The brick home stands stately reminding citizens of an era in the town's history.

== Work as Governor ==
Herman Guy Kump focused upon public education, rights of property owners as related to taxation, and public welfare during his tenure as Governor of West Virginia. While Kump was Governor of West Virginia, new state programs were developed such as the state road administration, state park and forestry projects, state-run public assistance programming, and a county school system. His positions were moderate and he encouraged local control where possible. Governor Kump served West Virginia during demanding economic times and some of the programs developed during his tenure are still operational. Governor Herman G. Kump is buried in the Beverly Cemetery in Randolph County, West Virginia.

Ideologically, Kump has been described as a conservative.

Party political offices
| Preceded by J. Alfred Taylor | Democratic nominee for Governor of West Virginia; 1932 | Succeeded by Homer A. Holt |
Political offices
| Preceded by William G. Conley | Governor of West Virginia; 1933–1937 | Succeeded by Homer A. Holt |
