= Fred L. Fox =

American judge and politician (1876–1952)

Justice of the Supreme Court of Appeals of West Virginia
- In office 1937–1952
- Preceded by: M. O. Litz
- Succeeded by: Chauncey Browning Sr.

Member of the West Virginia Senate from the 10th district
- In office December 1, 1912 – December 1, 1920
- Preceded by: Jake Fisher
- Succeeded by: John N. Shackleford

Personal details
- Born: Fred Lee Fox; October 24, 1876
- Died: August 8, 1952 (aged 75)
- Party: Democratic
- Spouse: Anna Lee Frame (m. 1900)
- Education: West Virginia University (LLB)
- Occupation: Lawyer; politician

Fred Lee Fox (October 24, 1876 – August 8, 1952) was a justice of the Supreme Court of Appeals of West Virginia from January 1, 1937 until his death on August 8, 1952.

Born in Braxton County, West Virginia, Fox received a law degree from West Virginia University in 1899, and entered the practice of law in Sutton, West Virginia. He served as a Democrat in the West Virginia State Senate from 1912 to 1920, including several terms as Democratic leader. He held several other political and governmental offices before being elected to a twelve-year term on the state supreme court in a Democratic wave in 1936.

Fox married Anna Lee Frame, with whom he had three sons and three daughters who survived him. He died from heart disease at the age of 75.

West Virginia Senate
Preceded by Jake Fisher	Member of the West Virginia Senate from the 10th district 1912–1920; Served alongside: Robert F. Kidd, Eskridge H. Morton	Succeeded by John N. Shackleford
Political offices
Preceded by M.O. Litz	Justice of the Supreme Court of Appeals of West Virginia; 1937–1952	Succeeded by Chauncey Browning Sr.
