= Justice Fisher =

Justice Fisher may refer to:

- George P. Fisher (1817–1899), associate justice of the Supreme Court of the District of Columbia
- Stanley Fisher (1867–1949), 24th Chief Justice of Ceylon

== See also ==
- Patrick F. Fischer (born 1957), justice of the Ohio Supreme Court
- Judge Fischer (disambiguation)
- Judge Fisher (disambiguation)
