= Jack Robert Nuzum =

American politician

Jack Robert Nuzum (1921–1998) was a Circuit Judge representing Randolph County (20th Circuit) in Elkins, West Virginia from 1976–1991. Prior to that, he was also a legislator, for Taylor County, West Virginia and then, neighboring Randolph County, West Virginia in the West Virginia Legislature as a member of the House of Delegates.

After retirement from the judicial bench, Nuzum served as a Senior Judge for the State of West Virginia's Supreme Court System, occasionally being named to act in the place of other circuit judges when necessary. For many years, Jack R. Nuzum was a law partner of former West Virginia Governor Herman G. Kump in the Elkins law firm of Kump, Kump, and Nuzum. Herman Guy Kump was the 19th Governor of the state of West Virginia.

== Education ==
Nuzum was educated in the Taylor County, West Virginia public schools and graduated from Grafton High School. He attended Fairmont State College and after World War II earned his Bachelor of Science degree from West Virginia University. He then received his Doctor of Jurisprudence degree, law degree, from West Virginia University, being credentialed by the West Virginia University College of Law in 1952.

Nuzum was a member and president of the Randolph County Bar Association, and also was a member of the West Virginia Bar Association and the American Bar Association. As a lawyer, Nuzum practiced before the West Virginia Supreme Court of Appeals, the United States Circuit Court of Appeals (fourth circuit), the West Virginia Supreme Court, and the United States Supreme Court. In addition to public service, Nuzum had 24 years in private practice.

== Service ==
Jack Nuzum was a Captain in the United States Army Air Forces during World War II serving in the Pacific and European Theaters and North Africa or Mediterranean Theater. He first served when it was known as the United States Army Air Corps. He flew 70 missions during his service, known as a four-engine pilot. In 1943, Jack R. Nuzum was part of the 17th Troop Carrier Squadron, 12th Air Force and 62nd Troop Carrier group and was awarded an Air Medal Oak Leaf Cluster on July 16, 1943 for meritorious service in the North African Theater of Operation. A few years after his military service, Nuzum had a private pilot's license. He co-owned a small cub plane and flew from the Elkins Airport to nearby destinations during the 1950s and part of the 1960s. Nuzum served as a member of the Randolph County Airport Authority and served four years on the West Virginia Aeronautics Commission.

In the 1950s and early 1960s, Jack Nuzum served as a member of the color guard for the West Virginia Highlanders Band. The West Virginia Highlanders were a post band of the H. W. Daniels Post No. 29, American Legion, of Elkins, West Virginia. The band, now sponsored by Davis and Elkins College, is composed of bagpipe and drum musicians who wear kilts and play music of Scotland, or highland music, in many of the festival parades in West Virginia.

== Legislative work ==
Nuzum championed legislation in the West Virginia House of Delegates representing the Farm Block and worked with legislation for Daylight Saving Time (concept of Benjamin Franklin) as the state's determined participation in the time modification via legislation, prior to national time standardization efforts. Nuzum was also instrumental in preliminary drafts that eventually impacted branch banking legislation in the state of West Virginia.

== Personal life ==
Nuzum was married to Eldora Marie Bolyard Nuzum from 1926 to 2004. They had two children, Jefferson Patton Nuzum (Carrie Gould Nuzum) and Jon Cedric Nuzum (Diane Raszkowski Nuzum). Jack and Eldora Nuzum had two grandchildren, namely Lydia Ann Marie Nuzum and Derek Nuzum.

Eldora and Jack Nuzum were born in Grafton, West Virginia. Jack R. Nuzum was the son of Rena Henderson Rogers Nuzum (1891–1954) and John Frederick Nuzum (1886- ) and he had a half-brother, Chester F. Rogers (1913-1975). Eldora Nuzum was the daughter of Roy Everett Bolyard (1901–1983) and Georgia Ellen Deavers Bolyard (1909–1994) also of Grafton. Her siblings were Vonda Jean Bolyard Norris (Clyde Dale Norris); Robert Glen Bolyard (Jacqueline Westfall Bolyard); and Dr. Cassandra B. Whyte (William Rowland Whyte, Jr).
