= Bertie Ison Martin Conley =

- Born: June 30, 1873; Preston County, West Virginia
- Died: October 29, 1939 (aged 66); Charleston, West Virginia
- Known for: First lady of West Virginia, 1929-1933

Bertie Ison Martin Conley (June 30, 1873 – October 29, 1939) was the wife of former Governor of West Virginia William G. Conley, and served as West Virginia's First Lady from 1929 to 1933. She was born in Preston County, West Virginia. In 1892, she married William G. Conley. As first lady, she redecorated the West Virginia Governor's Mansion, adding outdoor gardens and artistic furnishings. On her 59th birthday and 69th anniversary of West Virginia statehood, she and her husband dedicated the new West Virginia State Capitol. After leaving office, the Conleys remained in Charleston, West Virginia, where she died at her home on Virginia Street.

Honorary titles
Preceded by Alma Bennett Morgan	First Lady of West Virginia; 1929 – 1933	Succeeded by Edna Hall Scott Kump
