= Howard Mason Gore =

American politician (1877–1947)

Howard Gore
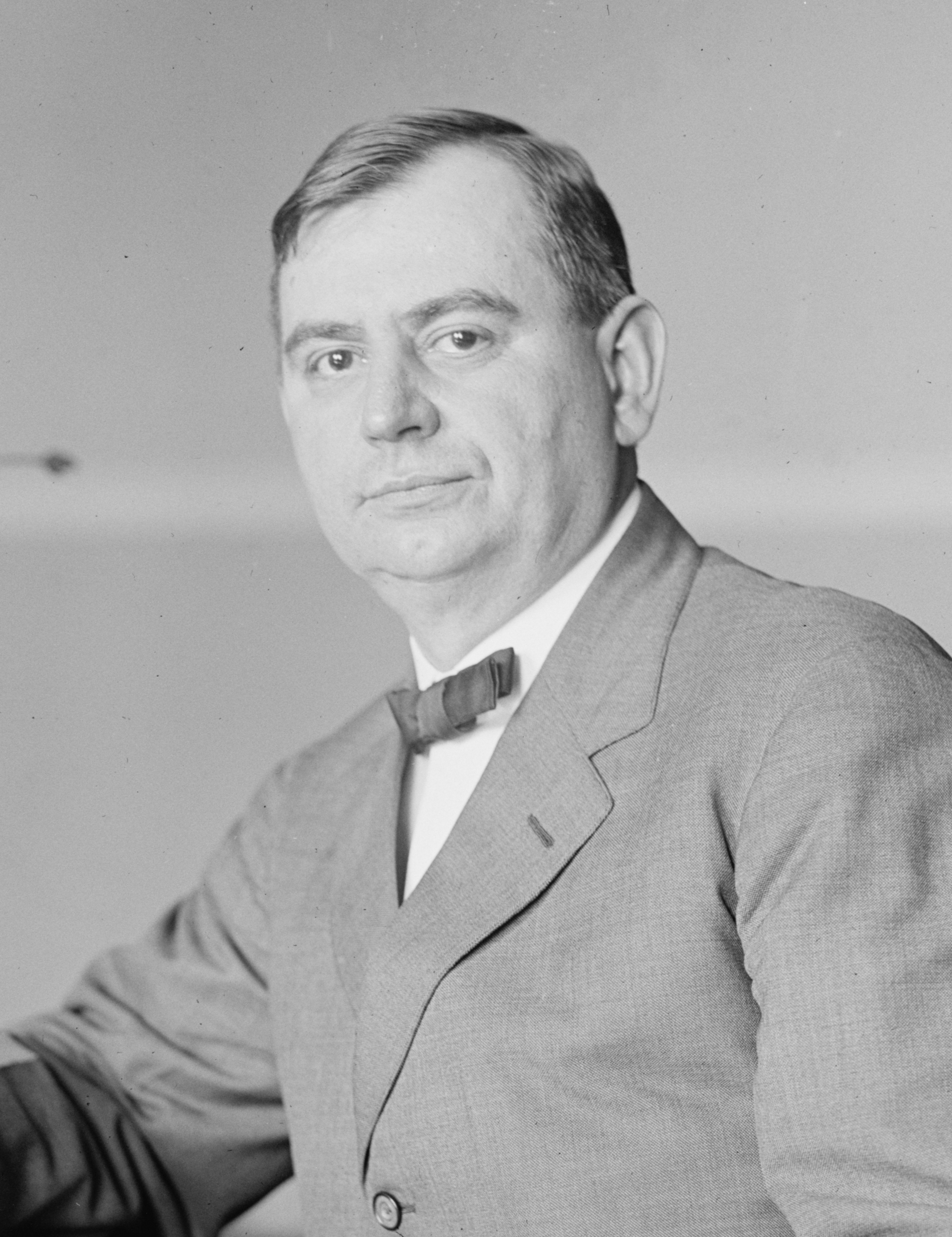
- Gore in 1923

17th Governor of West Virginia
- In office March 4, 1925 – March 4, 1929
- Preceded by: Ephraim F. Morgan
- Succeeded by: William G. Conley

8th United States Secretary of Agriculture
- In office November 22, 1924 – March 4, 1925
- President: Calvin Coolidge
- Preceded by: Henry Cantwell Wallace
- Succeeded by: William Marion Jardine

Assistant Secretary of Agriculture
- In office September 17, 1923 – November 21, 1924
- President: Calvin Coolidge
- Preceded by: Charles W. Pugsley
- Succeeded by: Renick William Dunlap

4th Agriculture Commissioner of West Virginia
- In office February 4, 1931 – March 4, 1933
- Governor: William G. Conley
- Preceded by: John W. Smith
- Succeeded by: James Blaine McLaughlin

Personal details
- Born: October 12, 1877 Harrison County, West Virginia, U.S.
- Died: June 20, 1947 (aged 69) Clarksburg, West Virginia, U.S.
- Party: Republican
- Spouse: Roxie Gore (m. 1906; died 1928)
- Education: West Virginia University, Morgantown (BA)

Howard Mason Gore (October 12, 1877 – June 20, 1947) was an American politician. He served as the 8th secretary of agriculture from 1924 to 1925 during the administration of President Calvin Coolidge. He served as the 17th governor of West Virginia from 1925 to 1929.

== Biography ==
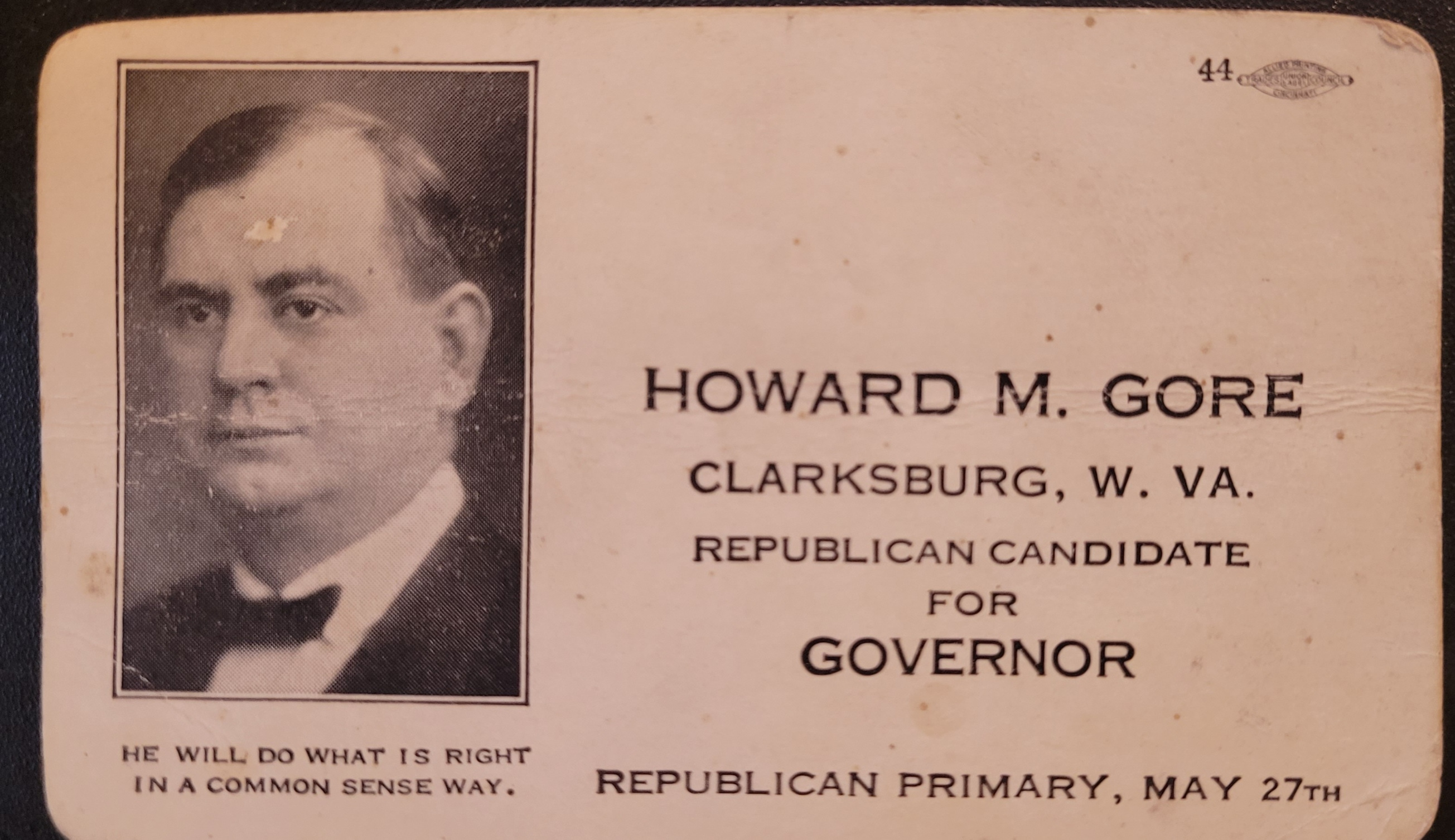

Gore was born in Harrison County, West Virginia, to farmer Solomon Deminion Gore and his wife Marietta Payne (née Rogers). Gore attended West Virginia University in 1900. He married the former Roxalene (Roxie) Corder Bailey on September 30, 1906. She died on March 7, 1928, and he remained a widower in office.

Gore served as president of the West Virginia Livestock Association from 1912 until 1916. He was appointed to the West Virginia State Board of Education from 1920 until 1925. He was Assistant Secretary of Agriculture from September 17, 1923, to November 21, 1924. On November 22, 1924, Gore served briefly as the secretary of agriculture following the death of his predecessor, Henry Cantwell Wallace (1866–1924).

On November 4, 1924, Gore was elected governor of West Virginia in the 1924 election. He assumed the governorship at the end of the partial first term of President Calvin Coolidge on March 4, 1925. Gore was appointed to serve as the West Virginia Commissioner of Agriculture starting in February 1931, caused by the death of Commissioner John W. Smith. He left office in March 1933, after his successor was elected in the 1932 election.

He died in Clarksburg, West Virginia, on June 20, 1947. He is interred there in the Elkview Masonic Cemetery.

Political offices
Preceded by Harry Wallace	United States Secretary of Agriculture; 1924–1925	Succeeded by William Jardine
Preceded by Ephraim F. Morgan	Governor of West Virginia; 1925–1929	Succeeded by William G. Conley
Party political offices
Preceded by Ephraim F. Morgan	Republican nominee for Governor of West Virginia; 1924	Succeeded by William G. Conley
Preceded by John W. Smith	Republican nominee for Agriculture Commissioner of West Virginia; 1932	Succeeded by Harvey A. Hall
Preceded by Harvey A. Hall	Republican nominee for Agriculture Commissioner of West Virginia; 1940	Succeeded by E. Bartow Jones
