= William G. Conley =

American politician (1866–1940)

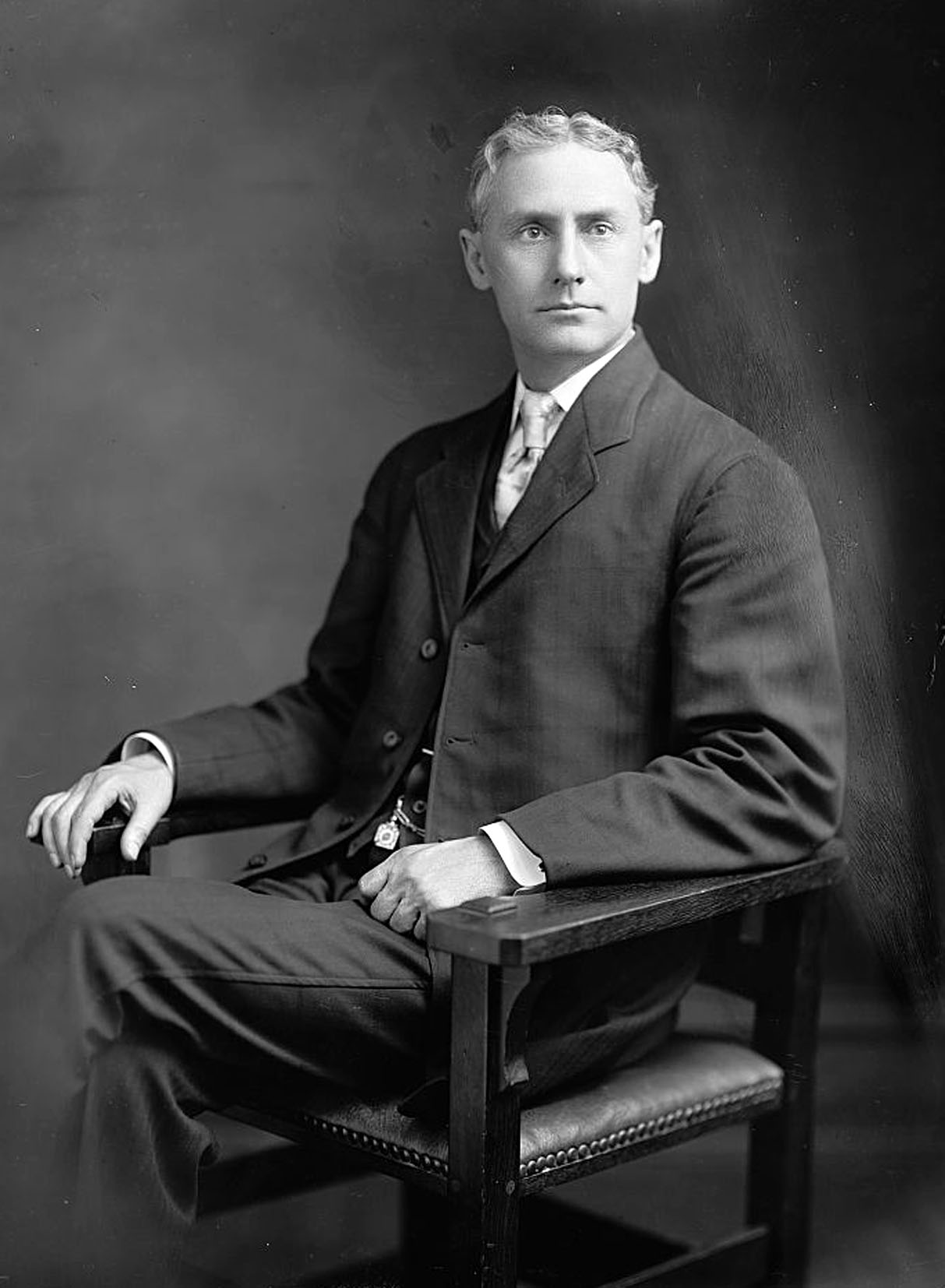

18th Governor of West Virginia
- In office March 4, 1929 – March 4, 1933
- Preceded by: Howard Mason Gore
- Succeeded by: Herman G. Kump

Attorney General of West Virginia
- In office May 9, 1908 – March 3, 1913
- Governor: William M. O. Dawson; William E. Glasscock
- Preceded by: Clark W. May
- Succeeded by: Armistead Abraham Lilly

Personal details
- Born: January 8, 1866 Kingwood, West Virginia, U.S.
- Died: October 21, 1940 (aged 74) Charleston, West Virginia, U.S.
- Party: Republican
- Spouse: Bertie Ison Martin Conley
- Profession: Politician

William Gustavus Conley (January 8, 1866 – October 21, 1940) was an American lawyer and politician who served as the Attorney General of West Virginia (1908–1913) and 18th governor of West Virginia as a Republican (1929 to 1933).

== Early and family life ==
He was born near Kingwood to Major William Conley and Mary Courtney Freeburn. He taught in the local public schools from 1886 to 1891. In 1892, he married Bertie Ison Martin. In 1893 he graduated from West Virginia University with a degree in law.

== Career ==
After admission to the West Virginia bar, Conley began a law practice in Parsons, West Virginia. While there he served as Tucker County prosecuting attorney, and later as the mayor of Parsons. He also founded and was the editor of the Parsons Advocate newspaper. He also served as mayor of Kingwood from 1906 to 1908.

In 1908, Governor William Dawson appointed Conley to the post of state Attorney General. After being elected to the same office in 1908 by defeating Democrat Eskridge H. Morton, Conley continued in that role under Governor William Glasscock. In 1911, he argued before the Supreme Court of the United States in the case of Virginia v. West Virginia, 220 U.S. 1 (1911) which involved Virginia's pre-Civil War debt and West Virginia's share of it. He was also involved in Maryland v. West Virginia, 225 U.S. 1 (1912) which involved the border between Maryland and West Virginia.

In 1912, Conley ran for Congress as a Republican but lost by 214 votes out of about 47,000. Over the next 12 years he was a lawyer in Charleston. In 1924, he was appointed to the State Board of Education. He served there until his resignation on March 1, 1929. He was elected as governor of West Virginia in November 1928 with the slogan of "Conley Commands Confidence" and was inaugurated on March 4, 1929. His time as governor was marked by the Great Depression. His time as governor, limited by the state constitution at the time to one term, ended on March 4, 1933. He remained in Charleston and organized the law firm of Conley, Thompson, and Neff.

Party political offices
Preceded by Howard Mason Gore	Republican Party nominee for Governor of West Virginia; 1928	Succeeded by Thomas Chasteene Townsend
Legal offices
Preceded by Clark W. May	Attorney General of West Virginia; 1908–1913	Succeeded by Armistead Abraham Lilly
Political offices
Preceded by Howard M. Gore	Governor of West Virginia; 1929–1933	Succeeded by H. Guy Kump
