= Leonard S. Echols =

American politician (1871–1946)

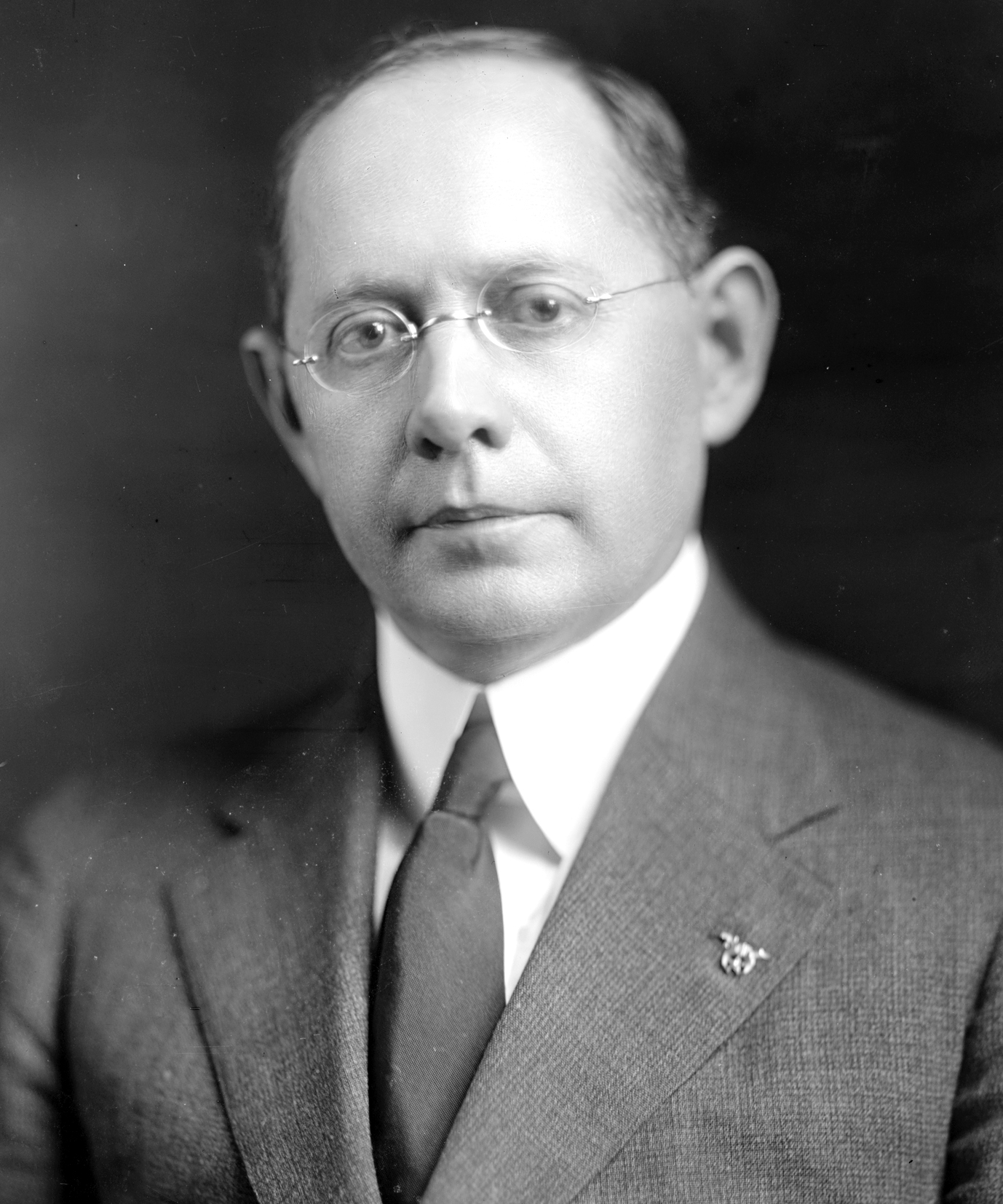

Member of the U.S. House of Representatives from West Virginia's 5th district
- In office March 4, 1919 – March 3, 1923
- Preceded by: Adam Brown Littlepage
- Succeeded by: J. Alfred Taylor

Personal details
- Born: Leonard Sidney Echols; October 30, 1871 Madison, West Virginia, U.S.
- Died: May 9, 1946 (aged 74) Charleston, West Virginia, U.S.
- Resting place: Sunset Memorial Park, South Charleston, West Virginia, U.S.
- Party: Republican
- Education: University of Kentucky; Concord State Normal School
- Profession: Politician, lawyer

Leonard Sidney Echols (October 30, 1871 – May 9, 1946) was an American politician who represented West Virginia in the United States House of Representatives from 1919 to 1923.

Echols was born in Madison, West Virginia. He attended public school. He graduated from the commercial department of the University of Kentucky at Lexington in 1894, from the Concord State Normal School, Athens, West Virginia in 1898, and from the law department of the Southern Normal University, Huntingdon, Tennessee in 1900. After all his formal education, he was admitted to the bar in 1900 and commenced practice in Point Pleasant, West Virginia in 1903.

Echols was the prosecuting attorney of Mason County, West Virginia in 1904–09 and assistant state tax commissioner for West Virginia in 1909–19. He was elected as a Republican to the Sixty-sixth and Sixty-seventh Congresses (March 4, 1919 – March 3, 1923). While in Congress, he served as chairman of the Committee on Expenditures in the Department of Navy (Sixty-sixth and Sixty-seventh Congresses). He was an unsuccessful candidate for reelection in 1922 to the Sixty-eighth Congress and for election in 1924 to the Sixty-ninth Congress.

After leaving Congress, Echols served as a member of the committee on appeals and review of the United States Treasury Department from May 1, 1923, to September 15, 1924. He was a delegate to the Republican State convention in 1924, and the postmaster at Charleston, West Virginia 1925-1928. He resumed the practice of law and served as Referee in Bankruptcy and as special master in the United States District Court, Charleston, West Virginia. He died in Charleston, West Virginia in 1946 and was buried in Sunset Memorial Park, South Charleston, West Virginia.

U.S. House of Representatives
Preceded by Adam B. Littlepage	Member of the U.S. House of Representatives from West Virginia's 5th congressional district 1919–1923	Succeeded by J. Alfred Taylor
