= The Inter-Mountain =

Daily newspaper in Elkins, West Virginia

- Type: Daily newspaper
- Format: Broadsheet
- Owner: Ogden Newspapers Inc.
- Publisher: Steve Herron
- Editor: Brad Johnson
- Headquarters: 520 Railroad Avenue; Elkins, West Virginia 26241; United States
- Circulation: 4,034 Daily; 4,389 Sunday (as of 2021)
- Website: theintermountain.com

The Inter-Mountain is a daily newspaper in Elkins, West Virginia. It is owned by Ogden Newspapers.

== History ==
In 1897, a fire in the town did much damage to the early newspaper offices and other structures. Again, on August 7, 1974, The Inter-Mountain burned to the ground and everything was destroyed but a camera, a roll of film, and the newspaper personnel who escaped with their lives literally running from the fire. Stories of the fire and the response to the emergency were highlighted in news stories published around the country.

A story in The Miami Herald noted that Editor Eldora Marie Bolyard Nuzum vowed that not one edition would be missed as a result of the fire. Other publications and the broadcast media carried the story of the newspaper that had not died in the fire and the famous radio commentator, Paul Harvey, praised the Editor, staff, and publisher for perseverance against the odds in one of his "now you know the rest of the story segments". By borrowing typewriters, getting a press delivered into Elkins meant for another town, and printing the paper at another Ogden site in Parkersburg, the next scheduled edition of The Inter-Mountain was delivered carrying the story of the fire on the first page. Not one employee lost their job.

In The 100 Best Small Towns in America by Norman Crampton, printed in 1995, Eldora Nuzum was quoted, "We made headlines across the country" and she suggested "the show must go on." Crampton wrote that "She asked townspeople who had darkrooms to go straight home and develop the film that many had shot of the big blaze downtown. Mrs. Nuzum even had the presence of mind to remember regular events--she assigned a reporter to cover the school board meeting that evening."

Over the years, The Inter-Mountain Editor, Eldora Nuzum, interviewed U.S. Presidents and other dignitaries and is recognized as a respected and honored American newspaper editor and American journalist. She was the first female editor of a daily newspaper in West Virginia. Though women before her published small, sporadic social publications, Nuzum was a pioneer in being managing editor of a daily periodical publishing hard news in the state.

== Publishing Information ==
The Inter-Mountain recently named a new publisher, Heather Goodwin Henline, who has been with Ogden Newspapers Inc. for 13 years. She has won multiple state and national newspaper awards and recognitions during her tenure. The West Virginia native most recently was editor of The Journal in Martinsburg, W.Va., one of The Inter-Mountain's sister publications.

Elkins native Steve Herron was named publisher of The Inter-Mountain on May 1, 2017.
