= Jake Fisher (judge) =

American judge and politician (1871–1951)

Member of the West Virginia Senate from the 10th district
- In office December 1, 1904 – December 1, 1912 Serving with Robert F. Kidd
- Preceded by: Hiram Campbell
- Succeeded by: Fred L. Fox

Member of the West Virginia House of Delegates from Braxton County
- In office December 1, 1898 – December 1, 1902
- Succeeded by: E. B. Carlin

Personal details
- Born: May 26, 1871 Flatwoods, West Virginia, U.S.
- Died: September 6, 1951 (aged 80) Berkeley Springs, West Virginia, U.S.
- Party: Democratic
- Spouse: Ella Byrd Corbett (m. 1897)
- Education: National Normal University; Washington and Lee University (LLB)
- Occupation: Lawyer; politician

Jacob Fisher (May 26, 1871 – September 6, 1951) was an American judge and politician from West Virginia. He served as a member of the state house and senate before being elected to a West Virginia circuit court seat. He was the Democratic Party nominee for Governor of West Virginia in the 1924 election.

West Virginia House of Delegates
Preceded by	Member of the West Virginia House of Delegates from Braxton County; 1898–1902	Succeeded by E. B. Carlin
West Virginia Senate
Preceded by Hiram Campbell	Member of the West Virginia Senate from the 10th district 1904–1912; Served alongside: Robert F. Kidd	Succeeded by Fred L. Fox
Party political offices
Preceded by Arthur B. Koontz	Democratic nominee for Governor of West Virginia; 1924	Succeeded by J. Alfred Taylor
