= Wappocomo (Romney, West Virginia) =

Georgian mansion in Romney, US

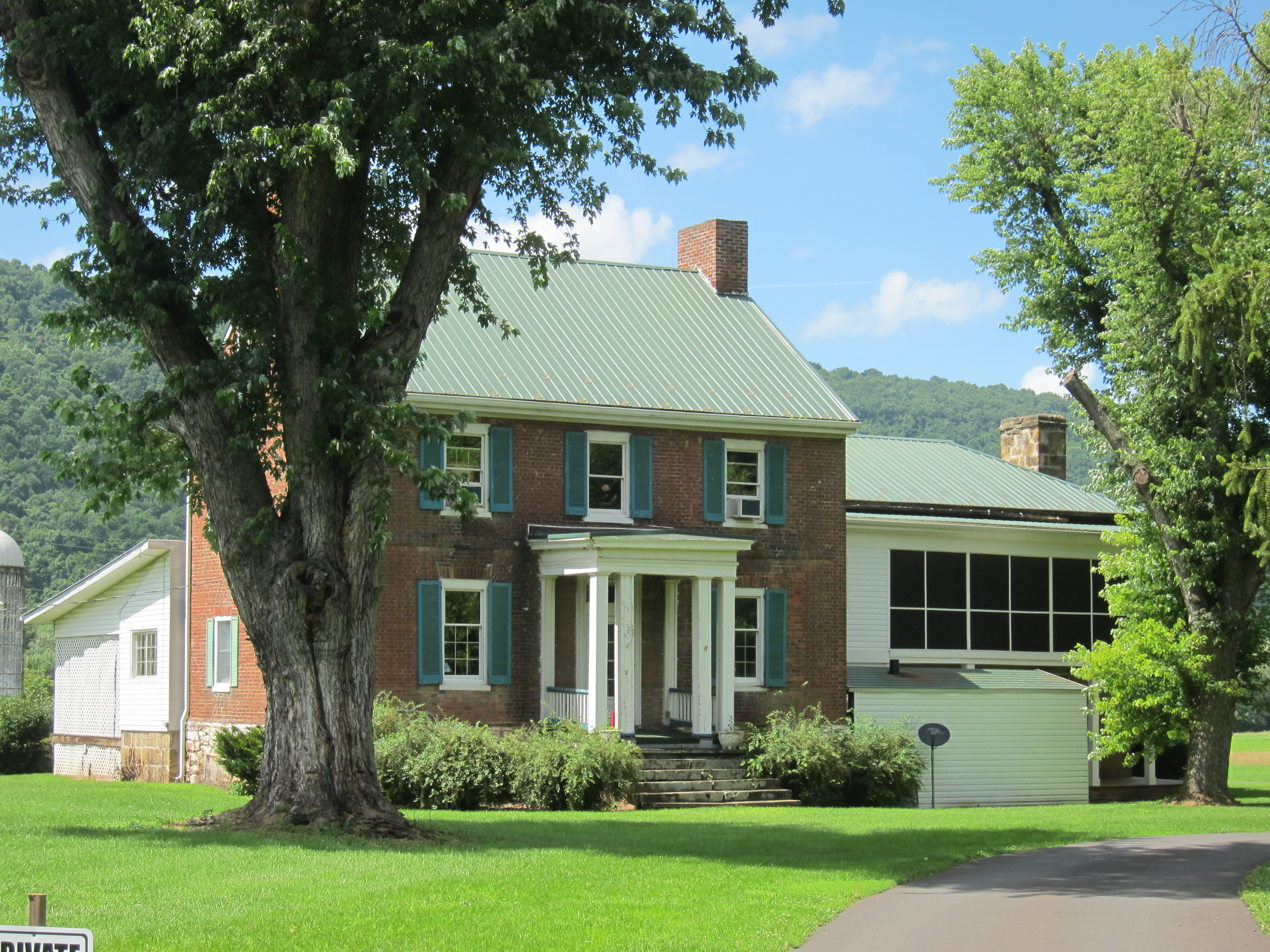
- Wappocomo viewed from Cumberland Road (West Virginia Route 28) in July 2013.

- Location within Eastern Panhandle of West Virginia

General information
- Type: Residential
- Architectural style: Georgian
- Location: Cumberland Road (West Virginia Route 28), Romney, West Virginia, United States
- Coordinates: 39.360345°N 78.752835°W
- Completed: 1774 (main house); 1861 (stone addition)
- Client: Nicholas Casey (1774); Col. Isaac Parsons (1861)
- Owner: Peter Casey; Nicholas Casey; James Gregg Parsons; Col. Isaac Parsons; Susan Blue Parsons; Garrett Williams Parsons; Charles Heber Parsons; Charles Heber Parsons, Jr. Charles Heber Parsons III; Charles Heber Parsons IV; Garrett Timothy Parsons Jr.

Wappocomo is a late 18th-century Georgian mansion and farm overlooking the South Branch Potomac River north of Romney, Hampshire County, West Virginia, USA. It is located along Cumberland Road (West Virginia Route 28) and the South Branch Valley Railroad.

The original section of the mansion at Wappocomo was built in 1774 by Nicholas Casey (1745–1833), using bricks that had been used as ballast to stabilize ships loading tobacco in the James River. The Wappocomo property had been a part of the South Branch Survey of Thomas Fairfax, 6th Lord Fairfax of Cameron's Northern Neck Proprietary. The Parsons family, prominent in Virginia and West Virginia politics in the 18th and 19th centuries, acquired Wappocomo and continue to maintain ownership of the property into the 21st century.

Wappocomo was involved in two slavery-related disputes that caused friction between the governments of Pennsylvania and Virginia. In 1788, Nicholas Casey purchased a freed slave by the name of John, who had been kidnapped in Pennsylvania and returned into slavery in Virginia. Pennsylvania Governor Thomas Mifflin demanded that the Governor of Virginia punish the three Virginia residents responsible for the abduction and re-enslavement of a freedman, however, Virginia's governor cited the absence of such a clause in the United States Constitution. In August 1855, a fugitive slave named Jacob Green escaped from Wappocomo with several other slaves to Pennsylvania. Col. Isaac Parsons (1814–62) and his nephews went north to pursue the escapees, resulting in the arrest of his nephew, James "Zip" Parsons III (1831–93). Parsons' trial caused a further dispute between the states of Virginia and Pennsylvania over the latter's refusal to execute the Fugitive Slave Act of 1850.

The mansion at Wappocomo is unique among the historic residences along the South Branch Potomac River, in that its formal façade faces toward the road and the western flanks of South Branch Mountain rather than toward the river. The original 1774 portion of the mansion is a square two-story Georgian-style structure, an architectural style prevalent in Virginia at the time of Wappocomo's construction. The bricks used to build the 1774 structure were manufactured in England, and used as ballast to stabilize ships loading tobacco in the James River. The interior of the 1774 structure contains a grand stairway in the center hall and all the original handmade woodworking. A stone addition to the mansion with two stories of deep verandas was completed in 1861. The principal passenger depot for the Potomac Eagle Scenic Railroad, Wappocomo Station, is located at the farm.

== History ==
=== Background and construction ===
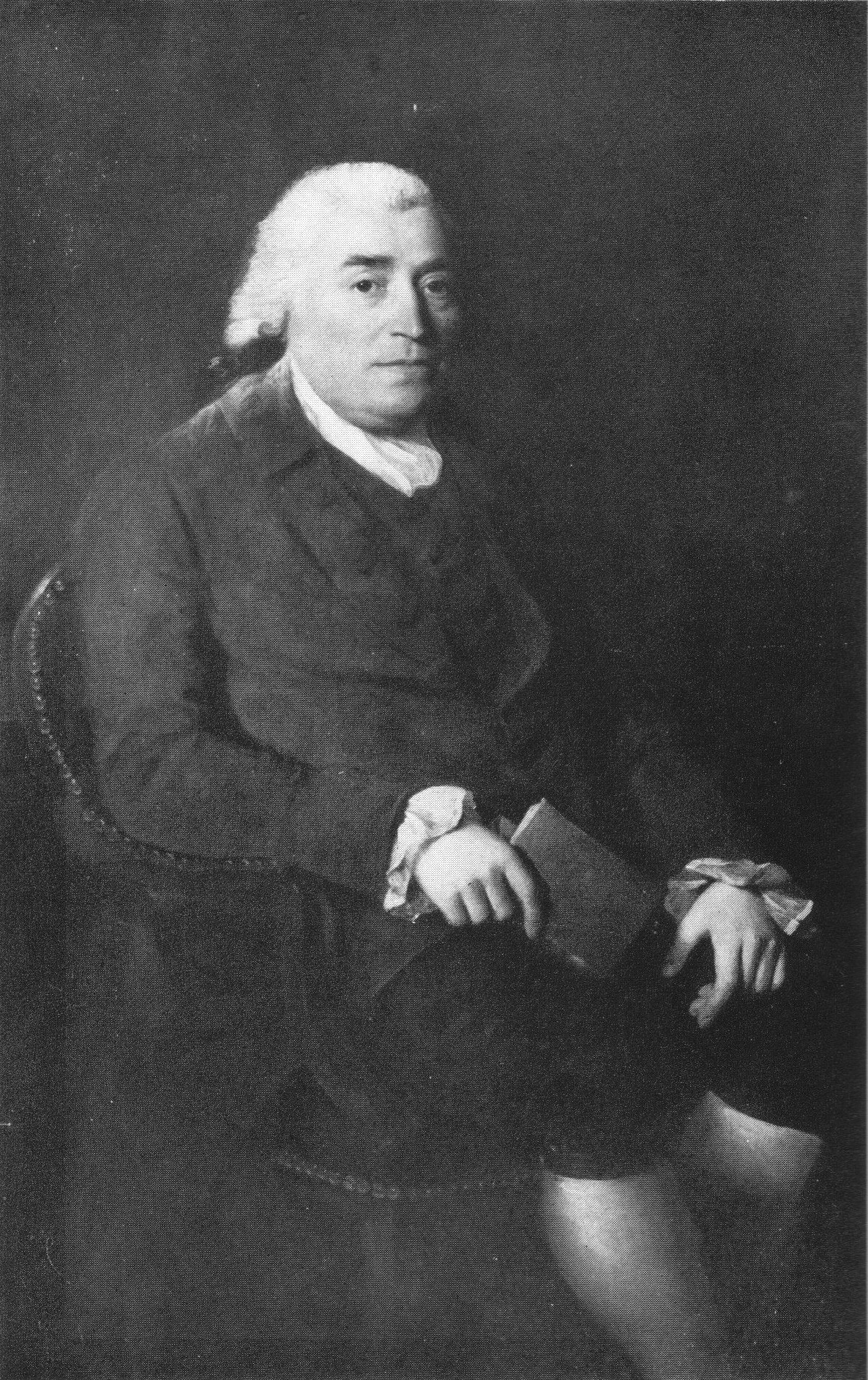
Thomas Fairfax, 6th Lord Fairfax of Cameron

The land upon which Wappocomo is located was originally part of the Northern Neck Proprietary, a land grant that the exiled Charles II awarded to seven of his supporters in 1649 during the English Interregnum. Following the Restoration in 1660, Charles II finally ascended to the English throne. Charles II renewed the Northern Neck Proprietary grant in 1662, revised it in 1669, and again renewed the original grant favoring original grantee Thomas Colepeper, 2nd Baron Colepeper and Henry Bennet, 1st Earl of Arlington in 1672. In 1681, Bennet sold his share to Lord Colepeper, and Lord Colepeper received a new charter for the entire land grant from James II in 1688. Following the deaths of Lord Colepeper, his wife Margaret, and his daughter Katherine, the Northern Neck Proprietary passed to Katherine's son Thomas Fairfax, 6th Lord Fairfax of Cameron in 1719.

Lord Fairfax selected a portion of the proprietary for his manor. This tract, known as the South Branch Survey of the Northern Neck Proprietary, extended from the north end of the Trough to the junction of the North and South Branches of the Potomac River. In 1748, Fairfax commissioned James Genn to survey the South Branch Potomac River lowlands for sale and lease, with lots ranging in size from 300 to 400 acres (120 to 160 ha).

Prominent Hampshire County pioneer Peter Casey (1715–87) received the Wappocomo parcel, known as Lot Number 21 of the South Branch Survey, from Lord Fairfax. Peter Casey's son, Nicholas (1745–1833), married Grace Foreman (1762–1796), the daughter of another Hampshire County pioneer and colonial military officer William Foreman. Nicholas Casey inherited Lot Number 21 from his father, and in 1774, Nicholas built the present mansion at Wappocomo.

The bricks used in the construction of Casey's mansion were manufactured in England, and used as ballast to stabilize ships loading tobacco in the James River. These bricks were then transported overland through the Blue Ridge Mountains and Ridge-and-Valley Appalachians in bullock carts. During this time, the mansion was named Wappocomo, which was derived from the Native American toponym "Wappatomaka" for the South Branch Potomac River.

In 1788, while residing at his Wappocomo residence, Casey purchased a freed slave named John, who had been residing in Washington County, Pennsylvania. Virginia residents Francis McGuire, Baldwin Parsons, and Absalom Wells seized John and transported him to Virginia, where they sold him back into slavery to Casey. Such an act was illegal in Pennsylvania, and the Pennsylvania Abolition Society petitioned Pennsylvania Governor Thomas Mifflin to demand punishment of the three men by the Governor of Virginia. Virginia's governor refused, citing the absence of a provision in the United States Constitution calling for such an action. Governor Mifflin petitioned the United States Congress, and a bill was introduced that provided against such an occurrence.

On December 4, 1789, Casey was appointed by an act of the Virginia General Assembly as a trustee of Romney. Casey served as a trustee alongside Isaac Parsons and Andrew Wodrow. Casey and his fellow trustees were given authority by the Virginia General Assembly to settle disputes regarding the town's land lots and to "open and clear" the town's "streets and lanes" in accordance with the original survey and plan for Romney.

=== Parsons family acquisition ===
Nicholas Casey's daughter, Mary Catherine Casey (1773–1846), married James Gregg Parsons (1773–1847) of Hampshire County in 1795. Parsons was the eldest son of Isaac Parsons (1752–1796) and his wife Mary Ellender Gregg. The Parsons were a prominent family whose ancestors arrived at the Thirteen Colonies from England in 1635, and relocated to Hampshire County around 1740. Isaac Parsons represented Hampshire County as a member of the Virginia House of Delegates from 1789 until his death on August 25, 1796. By 1778, Parsons owned 161 acres (65 ha) of Lot Number 16 and all of Lot Number 17, which was adjacent to the Wappocomo property.

James Gregg Parsons and his wife Catherine inherited Wappocomo from her father, and they raised their 12 children there. Following his wife's death, Parsons acquired sole ownership in Wappocomo plantation. After his death on January 25, 1847, his will, dated November 7, 1846, and probated February 22, 1847, devised Lot Number 21 including Wappocomo (referred to in the will as the Casey Tract) to his son Colonel Isaac Parsons (1814–62). On May 18, 1836, Col. Parsons married Susan Blue (1817–89), the daughter of Uriah Blue Jr. and his wife M. Elizabeth Donaldson Blue. Col. Parsons served as a member of the Virginia House of Delegates representing Hampshire County from 1854 to 1857. James "Big Jim" Parsons Jr. (1798–1858) inherited the Collins Tract (Lot Number 20), which later became Valley View, and his son David C. Parsons (1803–1860) inherited Lot Number 13. James Gregg Parsons' sons also inherited the nearby "Jake Sugar Rum Tract, the McGuire Tract, and five town lots in Romney."

=== Jacob Green affair ===
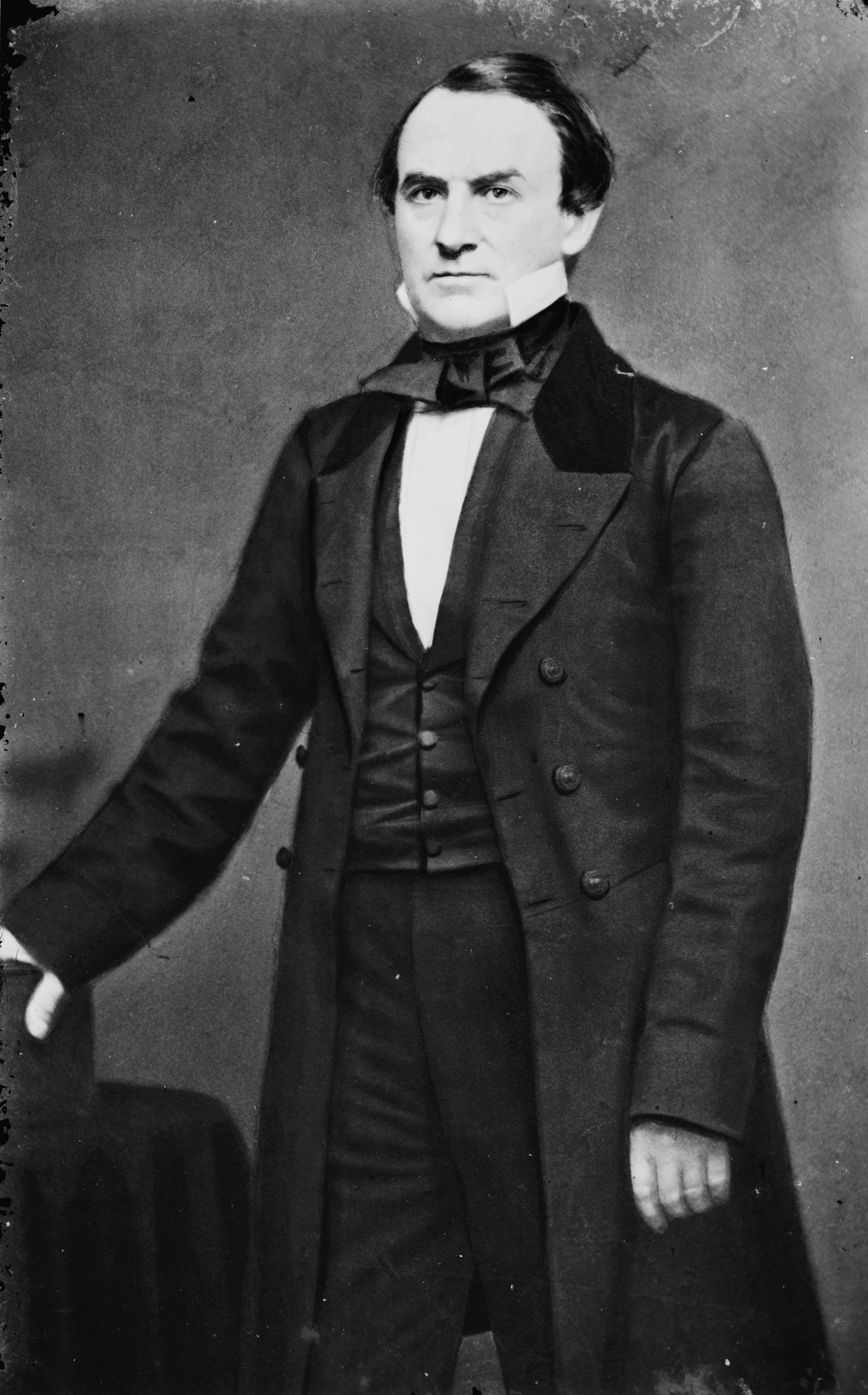
Charles James Faulkner

In August 1855, Jacob Green, a slave owned by Col. Parsons, escaped from Wappocomo farm with four other slaves from neighboring plantations. In October of that year, he returned to Col. Parsons' plantation in Romney, and persuaded four or five slaves from neighboring farms owned by Parsons family relatives to escape with him to Pennsylvania.

A party of eight to ten men, including Col. Parsons and two of his nephews, James "Zip" Parsons III (1831–93) and a Mr. Stump, went north in pursuit of the escapees. In the course of the pursuit, they captured two of Stump's escaped slaves, who were sent back to Hampshire County. With information obtained from the two recaptured slaves, Col. Parsons went to Johnstown, James Parsons III to Hollidaysburg, and Stump to Altoona, where they hoped to intercept Green as he headed west on the Allegheny Portage Railroad and Main Line Canal toward Pittsburgh. James Parsons III intercepted Green at Hollidaysburg, but local abolitionists thwarted his attempt to capture Green, and Parsons was arrested and arraigned for kidnapping.

Upon learning of the arrest of his nephew, Col. Parsons sought the assistance of Charles James Faulkner, a prominent Martinsburg lawyer and United States House Representative from Virginia's 8th congressional district, and of James Murray Mason, a United States Senator from Virginia. Faulkner and Mason both offered their legal services for James Parsons III's defense. The Virginia General Assembly pledged its support to Parsons and to Virginia's slaveowners in defending their constitutional rights and to protect them from prosecution. Virginia Governor Henry A. Wise appointed John Randolph Tucker to attend Parsons' trial as a "special commissioner" of Virginia. The dispute between Virginia and Pennsylvania escalated, and on January 31, 1856, an article published in the New York Herald read "Threatened Civil War between Virginia and Pennsylvania."

Col. Parsons, Faulkner, and Tucker traveled to Hollidaysburg for James Parsons III's trial. Faulkner provided for Parsons' legal defense, leading to his acquittal as having acted legally under the provisions of the Fugitive Slave Act of 1850.

In September 1856, Faulkner billed Col. Parsons $150 for his legal services. Parsons disputed the charge. In a series of articles in the Virginia Argus and Hampshire Advertiser, he declared that Faulkner had originally offered his services at no cost; that he had been lauded publicly for his generosity in doing so without ever denying that he had been working pro bono; and that he was practicing "duplicity and deception" in trying to win a reputation in his district through "specious acts of munificence".

Faulkner later served as United States Minister to France; following the American Civil War, he again served as a member of the United States House of Representatives, from West Virginia's 2nd congressional district. James Parsons III and his brother William Miller Parsons (born 1835) were later proprietors of the Virginia Argus.

=== Social events ===
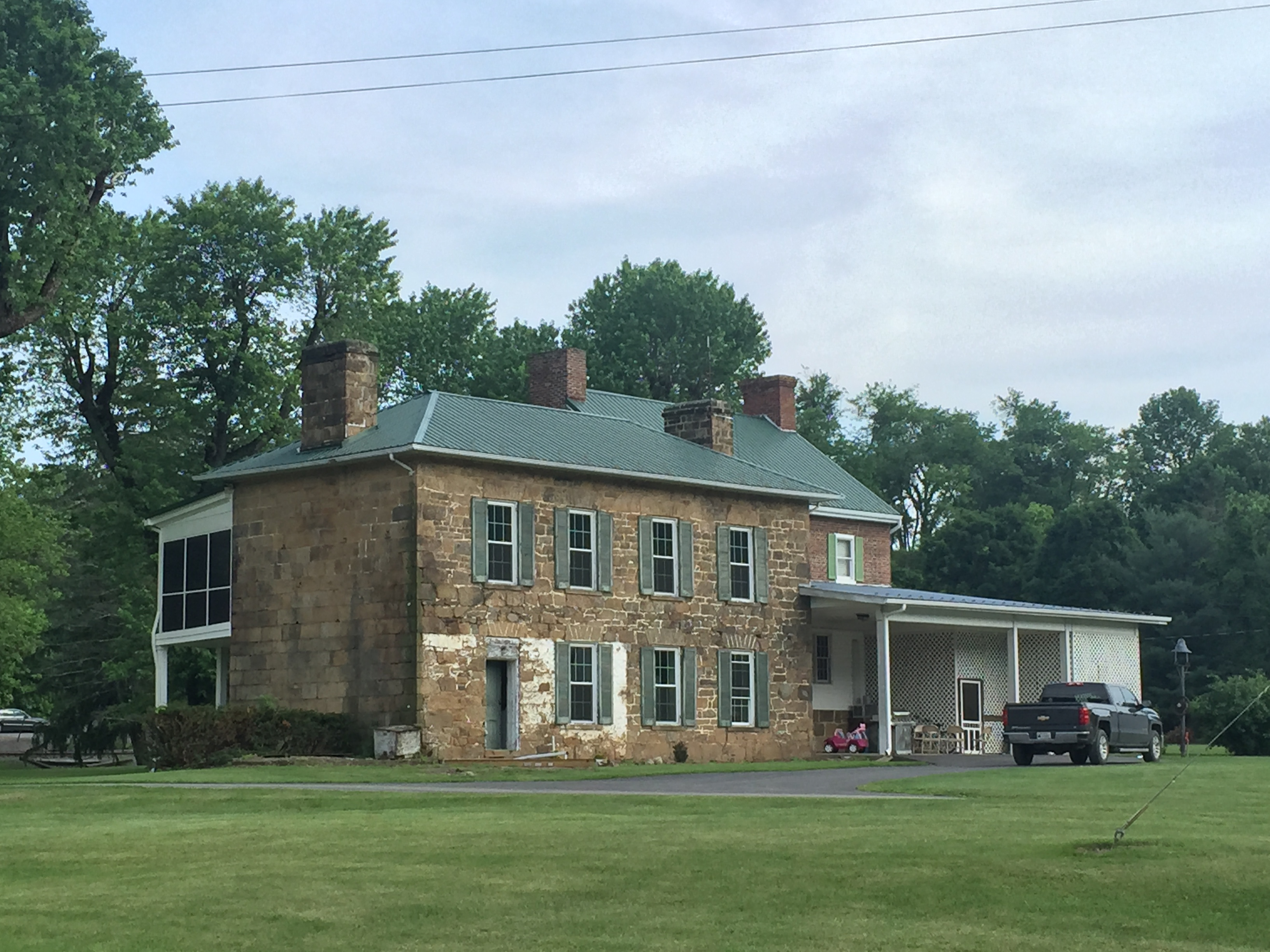
The rear elevation of the 1861 stone addition, viewed from the northwest.

Following its construction by Col. Parsons in 1861, the ballroom in the upper story of Wappocomo's stone addition served as the scene of many events and parties. According to tradition, as many as 100 couples have danced on the ballroom's wooden floor since its construction in 1861. It was the custom of the Parsons family to allow guests who were visiting the mansion for the first time to write their names and the date of their visit on the mortar between the addition's stone blocks; many of these signatures are still legible.

=== American Civil War ===
During the American Civil War, Col. Parsons received permission from the Confederate States government to raise an independent company of mounted infantry to provide defense along the border. He set about enrolling volunteers and, within a short period of time, enlisted approximately 30 men. Following its organization, the company became known as the Huckleberry Rangers of the Confederate States Army's 13th Virginia Volunteer Infantry Regiment. Parsons traveled to Richmond with a supply of cattle, and returned to his company's camp on the North River in Hampshire County around November 15, 1861. Throughout 1861, Col. Parsons "gratuitously" provided Confederate soldiers with food at his table and horses from his stables at his Wappocomo plantation.

Parsons was anxious to learn about the condition of his family and property at Wappocomo; he also needed an additional change of clothing and a blanket. Accompanied by Lieutenant Blue and Adam Parrish, he traveled west along the Northwestern Turnpike to around Pleasant Dale, then followed a series of roads and paths until nighttime, when they reached Sugar Hollow two miles north of Romney. Parsons stayed behind in the hollow, while Blue and Parrish started out for Wappocomo to retrieve a set of Parsons' clothes. Knowing that the Union Army kept a 24-hour guard at the main house, Blue circled around to the rear of the mansion and knocked on the window of his uncle, Garrett W. Blue, who was residing with the Parsons family. Garrett Blue warned his nephew about the Union Army soldiers possibly stationed on the home's front porch, and he subsequently fetched Parsons' daughter, Kate, who provided Lt. Blue with a parcel for her father.

Lt. Blue and Parrish returned to Sugar Hollow where Parsons was awaiting them, and Parsons set about locating pine from which to make torches to light their way out of the hollow. Parsons carried with him a small hatchet, and began splitting pine in the darkness to fashion a torch. He accidentally struck himself in the knee with his hatchet, and Blue applied a handkerchief to his wound to stop its bleeding. The three men traveled through the dark and rain to the nearby home of Frank Carter, where they ate and dried their clothes by the fire. The following morning, they mounted their horses and traveled to Rev. Harris' home, where Parsons and Blue parted with Parrish. Parsons and Blue continued east over Town Hill and reached George Thompson's residence on the Little Cacapon River, which had risen due to the previous night's rainfall. They remained with Thompson for two days until the river subsided, then traveled to Blue's Gap, where they set up camp. There, Lt. Blue received orders from Col. Angus William McDonald to carry out an expedition for General Stonewall Jackson to ascertain the number of Union Army infantry, cavalry, and artillery present in and around Romney; he was accompanied on this expedition by Col. Parsons' son, Isaac Parsons Jr., and by W. V. Parsons.

=== Post-war ownership ===
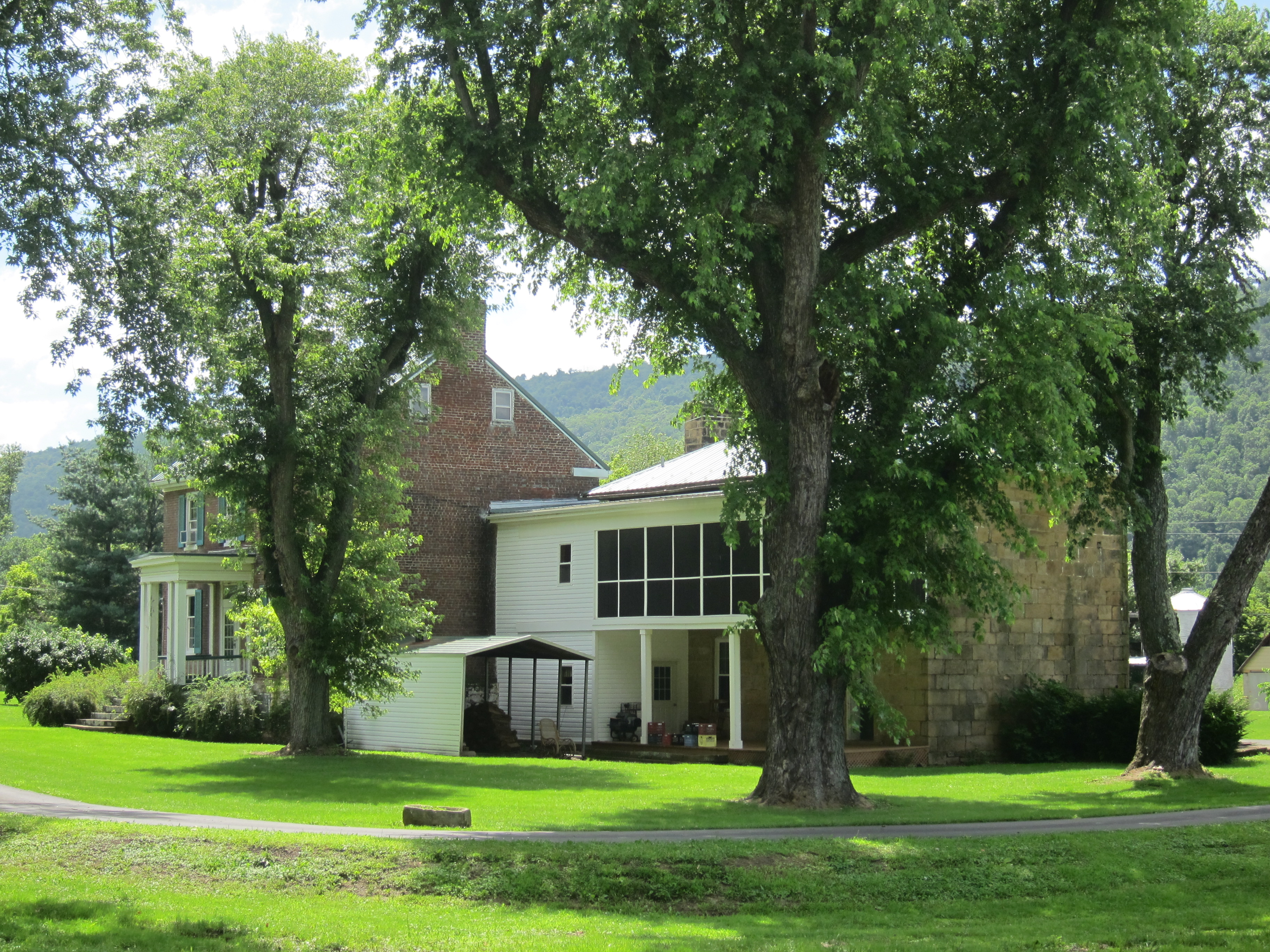
Wappocomo and its 1861 stone addition viewed from the South Branch Valley Railroad's Wappocomo Station.

Col. Parsons died on April 24, 1862, while the American Civil War was still in progress. On April 26, 1862, acting Quartermaster Lt. F. H. Morse of the Union Army completed his death certificate, in which he noted Parsons' "very fine house near Romney." Following his death, the plantation was inherited by Col. Parsons' wife, Susan Blue Parsons, for the purpose of raising and educating their children.

In 1884, the Baltimore and Ohio Railroad's South Branch line, connecting Green Spring and Romney, was completed. The line bisected the Wappocomo property and traversed the mansion's front lawn.

Susan Blue Parsons died on October 2, 1889. On December 20, 1890, Col. Parsons' son, Garrett Williams Parsons (1852–1935), acquired Wappocomo for $16,885.72 (~$536,410 in 2024), which he paid to Col. Parsons's other heirs for their shares in the property. On November 12, 1878, he married Mary Avery Covell (1852–1914), the daughter of West Virginia Schools for the Deaf and Blind principal John Collins Covell (1823–87). After the death of Garrett Williams Parsons on September 29, 1935, Wappocomo was inherited by his son Charles Heber Parsons (1886–1952), who resided on the farm with his wife Gertrude L. Parsons (1895–1968) and engaged in farming on the property. He subsequently bequeathed the mansion and farm to his only child, Charles Heber Parsons Jr. (1932–2002) and his wife Kathryn Anne Cole Parsons (1935–2004).

In 1972, the Baltimore and Ohio Railroad's South Branch line, located on the Wappocomo property, became part of the Chessie System. In 1978, ownership of the line was transferred to the West Virginia State Rail Authority, after which the old Baltimore and Ohio Railroad South Branch line became known as the South Branch Valley Railroad.

In 1991, the Potomac Eagle Scenic Railroad began operating on the South Branch Valley Railroad in 1991, running between Wappocomo Station and Petersburg via The Trough. Its principal depot is Wappocomo Station, located on the Wappocomo farm; the station consists of a ticket office housed in a red 1940 Baltimore and Ohio Railroad caboose, numbered C2507; the caboose is owned by the Chesapeake and Ohio Historical Society and leased by the Potomac Eagle Scenic Railroad.

Part of Wappocomo's original land tract, located near the city limits of Romney, was sold for residential building lots and for the Fruit Growers Storage facility, a refrigerated storage plant for fruit stands along the South Branch Valley Railroad near the mansion. The Fruit Growers Storage facility also provided refrigerated storage for fruit that was to be shipped as freight on the South Branch Valley Railroad.

Charles Heber Parsons, Jr.'s son, Charles "Chuck" Heber Parsons III (1955–2012), inherited the farm at Wappocomo and carefully restored and maintained the property. Parsons was a prominent member of the Romney community and served as Assistant Chief of the Romney Volunteer Fire Department. He also served in the United States Air Force and worked as an engineer for Dyno Nobel, a manufacturer of explosives. Parsons was an avid bowler, and competed in local, state, and national bowling tournaments. In October 2013, the first annual Chuck Parsons Memorial Bowling Tournament was held in his honor, with the proceeds benefitting the Hampshire County Parks and Recreation Department summer youth programs. Following Parsons' passing in 2012, Wappocomo was inherited by his children, Charles "Chip" Heber Parsons IV and Jillyn Marie Parsons.

== Architecture ==
=== Exterior ===
The original 1774 portion of the mansion is a square two-story Georgian-style structure with a basement and attic, an architectural style prevalent in Virginia at the time of Wappocomo's construction. This part of the mansion is built of large weighted ballast bricks, with walls that measure 1 foot 6 inches (0.46 m) in depth, allowing for deep inset windows. It also features two inside chimneys on either side, which once stood higher above its steep roof. The mansion's formal entrance is covered by a small portico supported with wooden columns and engaged columns at the wall.

Other historic homes located along the South Branch Potomac River face the river; the mansion at Wappocomo is unique in that its formal façade faces toward Cumberland Road (West Virginia Route 28) and the western flanks of South Branch Mountain. This may be due in part to the house's distance from the river, approximately 0.5 miles (0.80 km). The house's second-floor rear windows offer a scenic view of the South Branch Potomac River.

=== Interior ===
The home's wooden sill plates and joists were sawed by hand and the "rot nails" used for their construction were manufactured in the blacksmith shop on the Wappocomo plantation. The residence at Wappocomo also features unusually high fireplace mantelpieces, wide grooved window moldings and casings with base panels, solid paneled doors, and interior woodworking throughout, all of which were handmade. Every room of the main structure originally contained a corner fireplace.

Both of the mansion's two floors consist of four large rooms with high ceilings, and each of these rooms is exactly the same size and shape. A grand stairway is located at the end of the mansion's central hall, extending from the first floor to the attic. The stairway's handrail is crafted of walnut, and it is connected to the stairway's shallow steps by a balustrade consisting of three small balusters per step.

The basement rooms at Wappocomo are located almost entirely aboveground. The house's foundation is constructed of large stone blocks, into which was crafted a large open fireplace that once exhibited a swinging iron chimney crane. The space around this large open fireplace within the mansion's basement formerly served as a kitchen, where most of the cooking and food preparation took place. Entry into the home's basement is accessible through a wide and heavy exterior door.

=== Stone addition ===
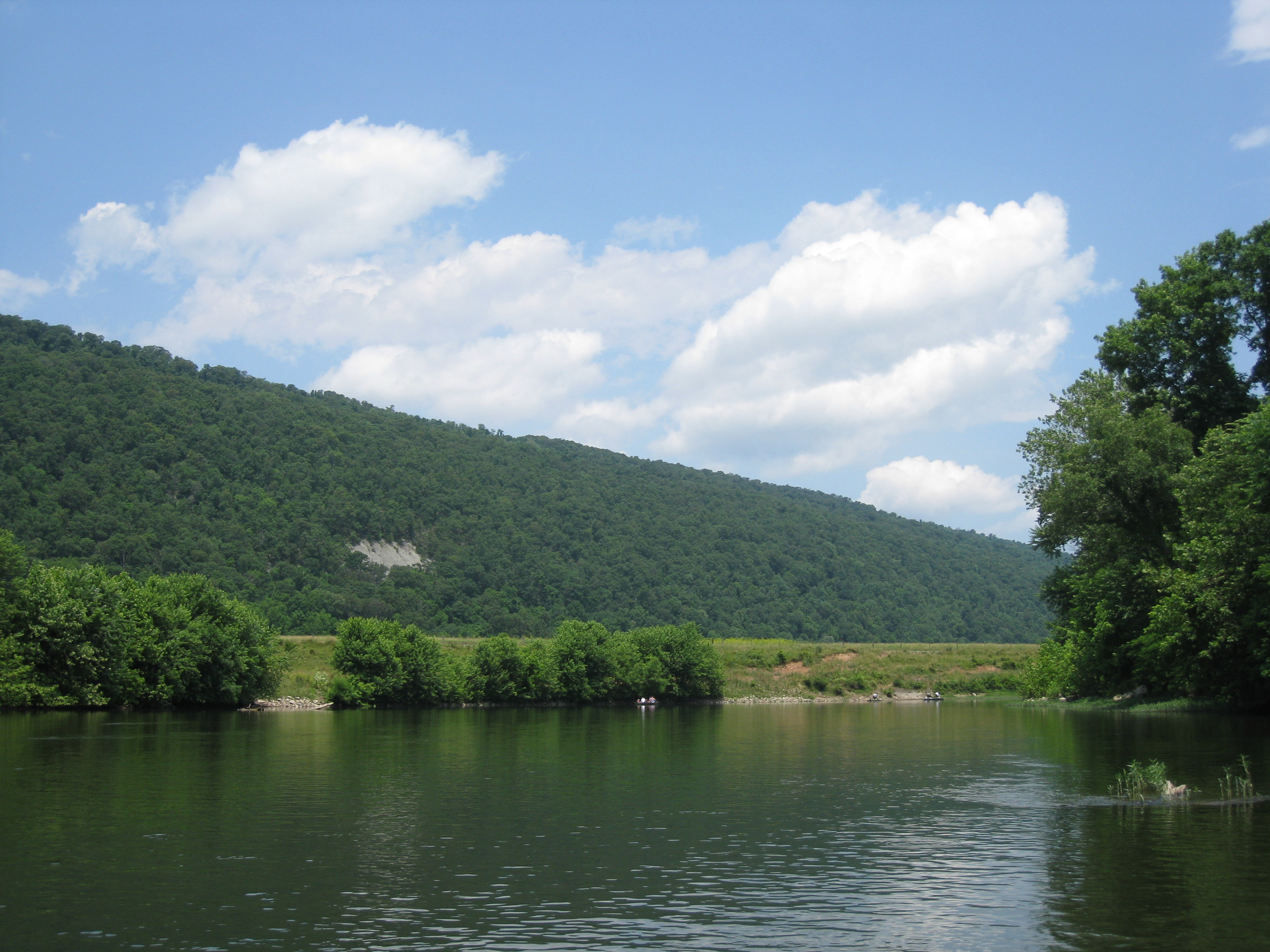
Mill Creek Mountain viewed from the South Branch Potomac River.

In 1861, a stone addition to the original 1774 Georgian structure was built. The large stone blocks used for the construction of the addition were quarried from the plantation's Mill Creek Mountain, a ridge located across the South Branch Potomac River to the west of the mansion. The stone blocks were hewed by sawyers, then transported across the river to the mansion, and lifted upon the addition's scaffolding with wheelbarrows. A Mr. Ferrybe supervised and managed the stone addition's construction.

The 1861 stone addition's two floors consisted of two large rooms on each floor, with 12-foot (3.7 m) ceilings. The two upstairs rooms were transformed into a large ballroom, while the two downstairs rooms were used as a dining room and kitchen.

The stone addition exhibits two stories of deep verandas extending across its eastern front façade. These verandas were once supported by tall columns rising from the addition's ground-level porch, to the roof of the second-story porch. An exterior stairway once connected the lower porch to the upper porch.

== Geography ==
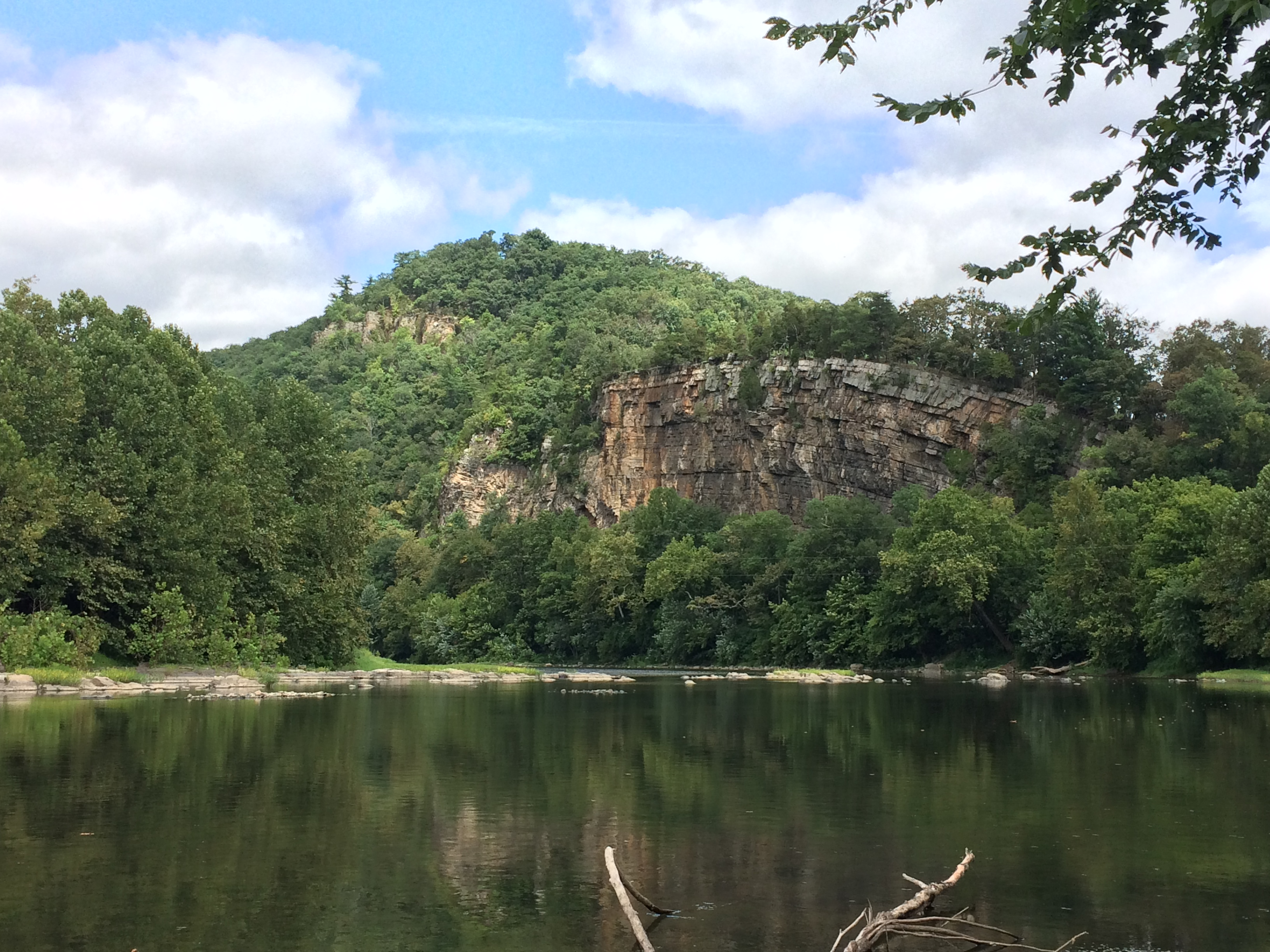
Hanging Rocks

Wappocomo farm is located within the relatively flat floodplain of the South Branch Potomac River valley, to the north of Romney. The farm's property adjoins the Valley View farm and Romney corporate limits to the southwest, the South Branch Potomac River to the west and north, and the South Branch Valley Railroad line and Cumberland Road (West Virginia Route 28) to the east. Mill Creek Mountain, a narrow anticlinal mountain ridge, rises to the west of the opposite riverbank of the South Branch Potomac River, and the western foothills of South Branch Mountain rise to the east. Mill Creek and South Branch Mountains contain Appalachian-Blue Ridge forests of hardwoods and pine. Hanging Rocks, cliffs of stratified Oriskany sandstone and limestone layers, are located within a gap where the South Branch Potomac River cuts through Mill Creek Mountain approximately 3 miles (4.8 km) north of Wappocomo farm. The unincorporated area at Hanging Rocks is known similarly as Wapocomo (or Wappocomo).

Big Run, a tributary stream of the South Branch Potomac River, flows north bisecting the Wappocomo property, bordered by dense foliage. Shortly before it enters Wappocomo farm, Big Run flows alongside ledges of gray shale known to contain Chonetes and Camarotoechia fossils. A smaller unnamed stream flows through the front lawn of the house at Wappocomo before curving northwest toward its confluence with Big Run. Corn is the primary crop produced in Wappocomo's agricultural fields along the South Branch Potomac River, which consist of rich alluvial soils.

=== Washington Place ===
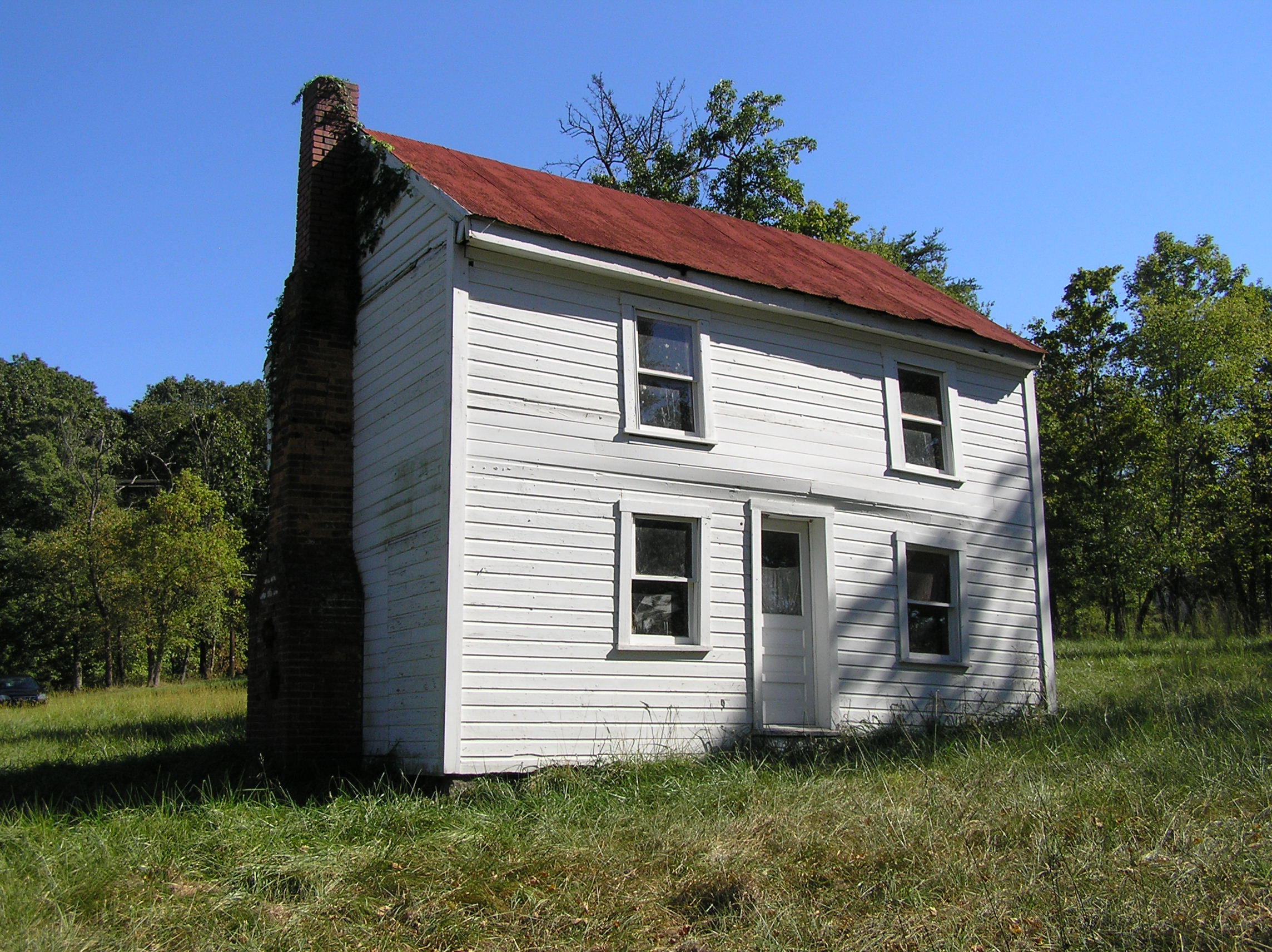
Washington Place

On November 7, 1874, Col. Parsons' widow, Susan Blue Parsons, conveyed 2 acres (0.81 ha) of Wappocomo's land to freedman William Washington, his wife Ann, and their children. Washington had previously worked on Washington Bottom Farm, from which he took the surname of his owner, George William Washington. This deed enabled the Washington family to reside on that land lot as long as any of the individuals specified in the deed lived there. On September 17, 1892, Garrett Williams Parsons and his wife, Mary Avery Covell Parsons, conveyed to Washington an additional 3 acres (1.2 ha) of land. The old log house built by Washington on this former Wappocomo land lot is presently known as Washington Place, and it is thought to be one of the first residences built by freed slaves in Hampshire County.

== See also ==
- List of historic sites in Hampshire County, West Virginia
- List of plantations in West Virginia

== Bibliography ==
- Blue, John (1994). Daniel P. Oates (ed.). Hanging Rock Rebel: Lt. John Blue's War in West Virginia and the Shenandoah Valley. Shippensburg, Pennsylvania: Burd Street Press. ISBN 978-0-942597-62-2. OCLC 29254746. Archived from the original on May 1, 2014.
- Brannon, Selden W., ed. (1976). Historic Hampshire: A Symposium of Hampshire County and Its People, Past and Present. Parsons, West Virginia: McClain Printing Company. ISBN 978-0-87012-236-1. OCLC 3121468.
- Chamberlin, Thomas Chrowder; University of Chicago, Department of Geology (1915). The Journal of Geology. Chicago, Illinois: University of Chicago Press. Archived from the original on December 18, 2017.
- Coleman, Roy V. (1951). Liberty and Property. New York City: Scribner. OCLC 1020487 – via Internet Archive.
- Federal Writers' Project (1937). Historic Romney 1762–1937. Romney, West Virginia: Federal Writers' Project, The Town Council of Romney, West Virginia. OCLC 2006735. Archived from the original on January 1, 2014.
- Finkelman, Paul (2012). Fugitive Slaves and American Courts: The Pamphlet Literature. Clark, New Jersey: The Lawbook Exchange, Ltd. ISBN 978-1-58477-740-3. OCLC 69645812. Archived from the original on June 13, 2014.
- Firelands Historical Society (1907). The Firelands Pioneer, Volumes 16-19. Vol. 16–19. Norwalk, Ohio: Firelands Historical Society. Archived from the original on May 2, 2014.
- Lewis, Virgil Anson (1889). History of West Virginia: In Two Parts. Philadelphia: Hubbard Brothers. OCLC 4270768.
- Lewis, Virgil Anson (1892). Southern Historical Magazine: Devoted to History, Genealogy, Biography, Archæology and Kindred Subjects, Volume 1. Charleston, West Virginia: Virgil Anson Lewis. OCLC 8188307. Archived from the original on January 1, 2014.
- MacCabe, Virginia Parsons (1913). Parsons' Family History and Record. Decatur, Illinois: Charles W. Nickey. OCLC 8590919.
- Maxwell, Hu; Swisher, Howard Llewellyn (1897). History of Hampshire County, West Virginia From Its Earliest Settlement to the Present. Morgantown, West Virginia: A. Brown Boughner, Printer. OCLC 680931891. OL 23304577M.
- McMaster, Len (2010). Hampshire County West Virginia Post Offices, Part 2 (PDF). LaPosta: A Journal of American Postal History. Archived (PDF) from the original on October 5, 2015.
- Munske, Roberta R.; Kerns, Wilmer L., eds. (2004). Hampshire County, West Virginia, 1754–2004. Romney, West Virginia: The Hampshire County 250th Anniversary Committee. ISBN 978-0-9715738-2-6. OCLC 55983178.
- Palmer, William P.; McRae, Sherwin (1885). Calendar of Virginia State Papers and Other Manuscripts, from July 2, 1790, to August 10, 1792, Preserved in the Capitol at Richmond, Volume V. Richmond, Virginia: Rush U. Derr, Superintendent of Public Printing. Archived from the original on June 13, 2014.
- Rice, Otis K. (2015). The Allegheny Frontier: West Virginia Beginnings, 1730–1830. Lexington, Kentucky: University Press of Kentucky. ISBN 978-0-8131-6438-0. OCLC 900345296. Archived from the original on May 27, 2016 – via Google Books.
- Rose, Cornelia Bruère (1976). Arlington County, Virginia: A History. Arlington County, Virginia: Arlington Historical Society. OCLC 2401541. Archived from the original on April 2, 2016 – via Google Books.
- Virginia House of Delegates (1856). Journal of the House of Delegates of the State of Virginia, for the Session of 1855–56. Richmond, Virginia: William F. Ritchie, Public Printer. Archived from the original on January 5, 2014.
- William and Mary Quarterly (April 1898). "The Northern Neck of Virginia". William and Mary Quarterly. 6 (4): 222–226. doi:10.2307/1915885. ISSN 0043-5597. JSTOR 1915885. OCLC 1607858.
- Zimmerman, Courtney Fint; Aurora Research Associates, Hampshire County Landmarks Commission (August 24, 2012). National Register of Historic Places Registration Form: Valley View (PDF). United States Department of the Interior, National Park Service. Archived (PDF) from the original on December 13, 2013.
