= Isaac Parsons =

Isaac Parsons may refer to:

- Isaac Parsons (Confederate military officer) (1814–1862), planter, politician and military officer in Virginia
- Isaac Parsons (Virginia politician) (1752–1796), his grandfather, planter, politician and militia officer in Virginia
