= James Allen (Virginia politician) =

American politician

Member of the Virginia House of Delegates from the Hampshire County district
- In office December 2, 1839 – 1840 Serving with David Gibson
- Preceded by: William Odell, George Park
- Succeeded by: William Odell, William Vance
- In office December 6, 1847 – December 3, 1849 Serving with Asa Hiett
- Preceded by: Daniel Thompson
- Succeeded by: Robert M. Powell, William P. Stump
- In office January 12, 1852 – December 4, 1853 Serving with Thomas B. White
- Preceded by: William P. Stump
- Succeeded by: Jesse Lupton, Isaac Parsons

Personal details
- Born: 1802
- Died: 1854 (aged 51–52)
- Party: Democratic

James Allen (1802–1854) was an American politician, farmer and soldier. He represented Hampshire County (which is now in West Virginia) in the Virginia House of Delegates 1839–40, 1847–49, and 1852–54. Allen received land grants along Patterson Creek in 1832 and 1848, and his brother Robert Allen (1808-1878) also settled in the area. Col. Allen commanded the 77th Regiment in the 3rd Division of the Virginia militia and died at Fort Ashby in an area of Hampshire County that became Mineral County, West Virginia after his death.

James Allen married Catherine Hollenback (1807-1896). Their family included sons James Clinton Allen (1828-1905), William A. Allen (b. 1830), Edward F. Allen (1834-1909), Hiram R. Allen (1839-1911), John Herman Allen (1841-1923), CSA Pvt. Elijah Allen (1843-1864) and Daniel Thomas Allen (1845-1939), as well as daughters Sarah Katherine Allen (1836-1842), Mary Jane Allen Monroe (1834-1909), Margaret Ann Allen Parker (1837-1905), and Rhoda Mariah Allen Gauer (1838-1919). Pvt. Allen enlisted in the 7th Virginia Cavalry on November 2, 1861, shortly after he turned 18, and was captured in August 1863 and died of scurvy as a prisoner of war on July 31, 1864.
