= Virginia Argus and Hampshire Advertiser =

Weekly newspaper in Romney, West Virginia

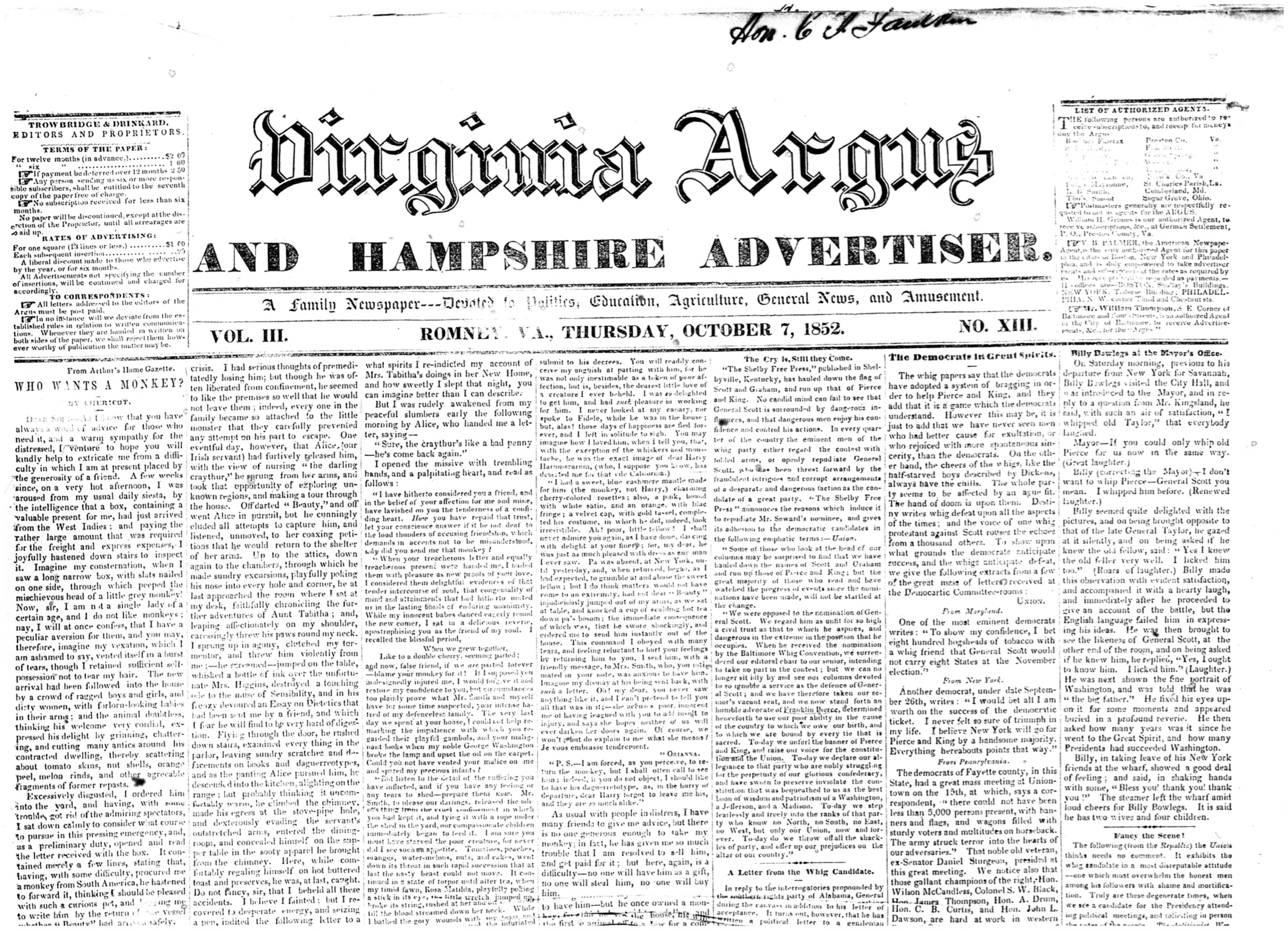
- Front page above the fold of an issue of the Virginia Argus and Hampshire Advertiser published on October 7, 1852.
- Type: Weekly newspaper
- Format: Broadsheet
- Owner(s): Owners serving as both editors and publishers: A. S. Trowbridge (1850–1852); A. S. Trowbridge and Drinkard (1852–1853); A. S. Trowbridge (1853–1857); Samuel R. Smith and John G. Combs (1857–1858); James Parsons (1858–1859); William Miller Parsons (1859–1861); Job N. Cookus and Alexander W. Monroe (1861)
- Founder: A. S. Trowbridge
- Founded: July 1850
- Ceased publication: August 1861
- Political alignment: Democratic
- Language: English
- Headquarters: Romney, Virginia (now West Virginia), United States
- Circulation: 800
- OCLC number: 11111337

The Virginia Argus and Hampshire Advertiser, often referred to simply as the Virginia Argus, was a weekly newspaper published between July 1850 and August 1861 in Romney, Virginia (now West Virginia). The paper's circulation of 800 copies was the second-highest in Hampshire County, after the South Branch Intelligencer's. The Virginia Argus ceased publication following its closure by the Union Army during the American Civil War, after which it was not revived.

The Virginia Argus documented the pursuit of fugitive slave Jacob Green by the Parsons family of Romney in 1856, and the ensuing dispute between the Parsons family and Charles James Faulkner over legal fees in 1857. At the time of the dispute, Faulkner was a member of the United States House of Representatives from Virginia's 8th congressional district; he later served as the United States Minister to France, and again as a member of the United States House of Representatives from West Virginia's 2nd congressional district.

Among the newspaper's proprietors was Alexander W. Monroe, a prominent Romney lawyer who had previously served as a member of the Virginia House of Delegates (1850–1851). Monroe and co-owner Job N. Cookus left the newspaper to serve in the Confederate States Army during the American Civil War. Following the war, Monroe represented Hampshire County in the West Virginia House of Delegates (1875–1877 and 1879–1883). During the 1875–1877 legislative session, he was the Speaker of the West Virginia House of Delegates.

== History ==
A. S. Trowbridge founded the Virginia Argus and Hampshire Advertiser as a Democratic weekly newspaper in Romney in July 1850. Trowbridge had been an educator in New Orleans, Louisiana, before moving to Romney. The Virginia Argus and Hampshire Advertiser newspaper billed itself as "A Family Newspaper—Devoted to Politics, Agriculture, Education, General News, and Amusement." By October 7, 1852, the Virginia Argus was being published by Trowbridge & Drinkard; on May 26, 1853, it reverted to being published by Trowbridge alone. After Trowbridge had edited and published the newspaper for seven years, its limited success did not meet his expectations, and in 1857 he sold the operation to Samuel R. Smith and John Joseph Combs.

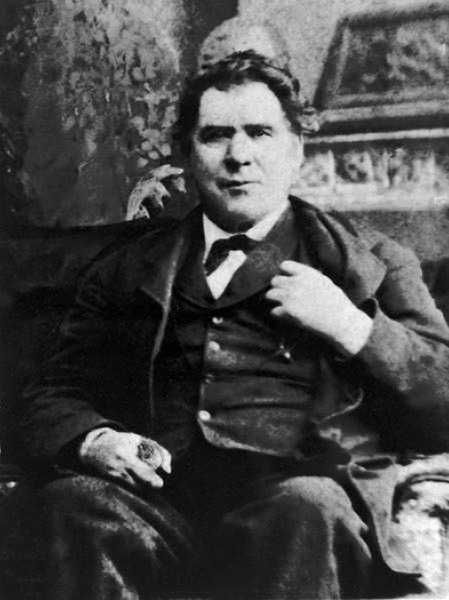
Alexander W. Monroe

Smith and Combs operated the newspaper until 1858, when they sold it to James Parsons; he in turn sold it to his younger brother William Miller Parsons in 1859. After a few months of ownership and experience, Parsons sold the newspaper to Alexander W. Monroe, a prominent Romney lawyer and onetime member of the Virginia House of Delegates, and Job N. Cookus in 1861. Monroe and Cookus continued serving as the proprietors, editors, and publishers until the outbreak of the American Civil War, when they joined the Confederate States Army. The newspaper was closed by the Union Army in August 1861, and was not revived after the war.

Following his service in the war, Monroe was elected to represent Hampshire County in the West Virginia House of Delegates in 1875, during which time he served as the Speaker. He again represented Hampshire County in the House of Delegates from 1879 to 1883. He was the first delegate to represent Hampshire County in both the Virginia General Assembly and the West Virginia Legislature.

The Virginia Argus and Hampshire Advertiser had a circulation of 800 copies distributed per week, which was the second largest of the three newspapers published in Hampshire County; the other two were the South Branch Intelligencer of Romney, with a weekly circulation of 960 copies, and the Piedmont Independent of Piedmont (now in Mineral County, West Virginia), with a weekly circulation of 600 copies. The offices of the Virginia Argus were housed in an old stone edifice north of the Hampshire County Courthouse that had previously served as the home of the Romney Academy before its 1846 disestablishment.

== Jacob Green affair ==
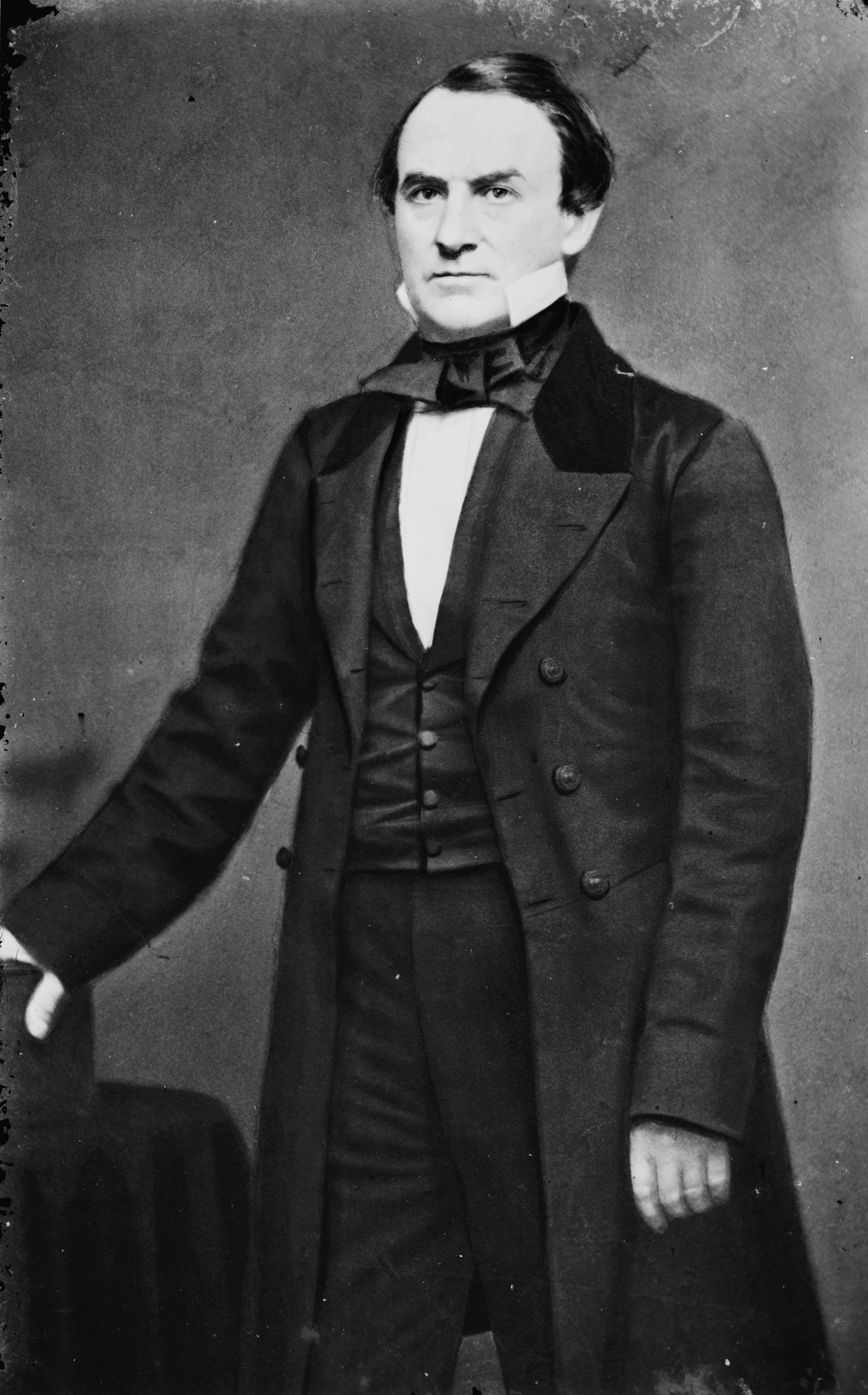
Charles James Faulkner

In a series of articles published in the May 14 and 21, 1857 issues of the Virginia Argus, Romney resident Col. Isaac Parsons chronicled the 1855 arrest of his nephew, James Parsons, for attempting to capture Col. Parsons' fugitive slave, Jacob Green, and the resulting dispute between the Parsons family and Charles James Faulkner over legal fees in 1857.

In August 1855, Green escaped from Parsons' Wappocomo plantation with four other slaves from neighboring plantations. In October of that year, he returned to Col. Parsons' plantation in Romney, and persuaded four or five slaves from neighboring farms owned by Parsons family relatives to escape with him to Pennsylvania.

A party of eight to ten men, including Col. Parsons and two of his nephews, James Parsons and a Mr. Stump, went north in pursuit of the escapees. In the course of the pursuit, they captured two of Stump's escaped slaves, who were sent back to Hampshire County. With information obtained from the two recaptured slaves, Col. Parsons went to Johnstown, James Parsons to Hollidaysburg, and Stump to Altoona, where they hoped to intercept Green as he headed west on the Allegheny Portage Railroad and Main Line Canal toward Pittsburgh. James Parsons intercepted Green at Hollidaysburg, but local abolitionists thwarted his attempt to capture Green, and he was arrested and arraigned for kidnapping.

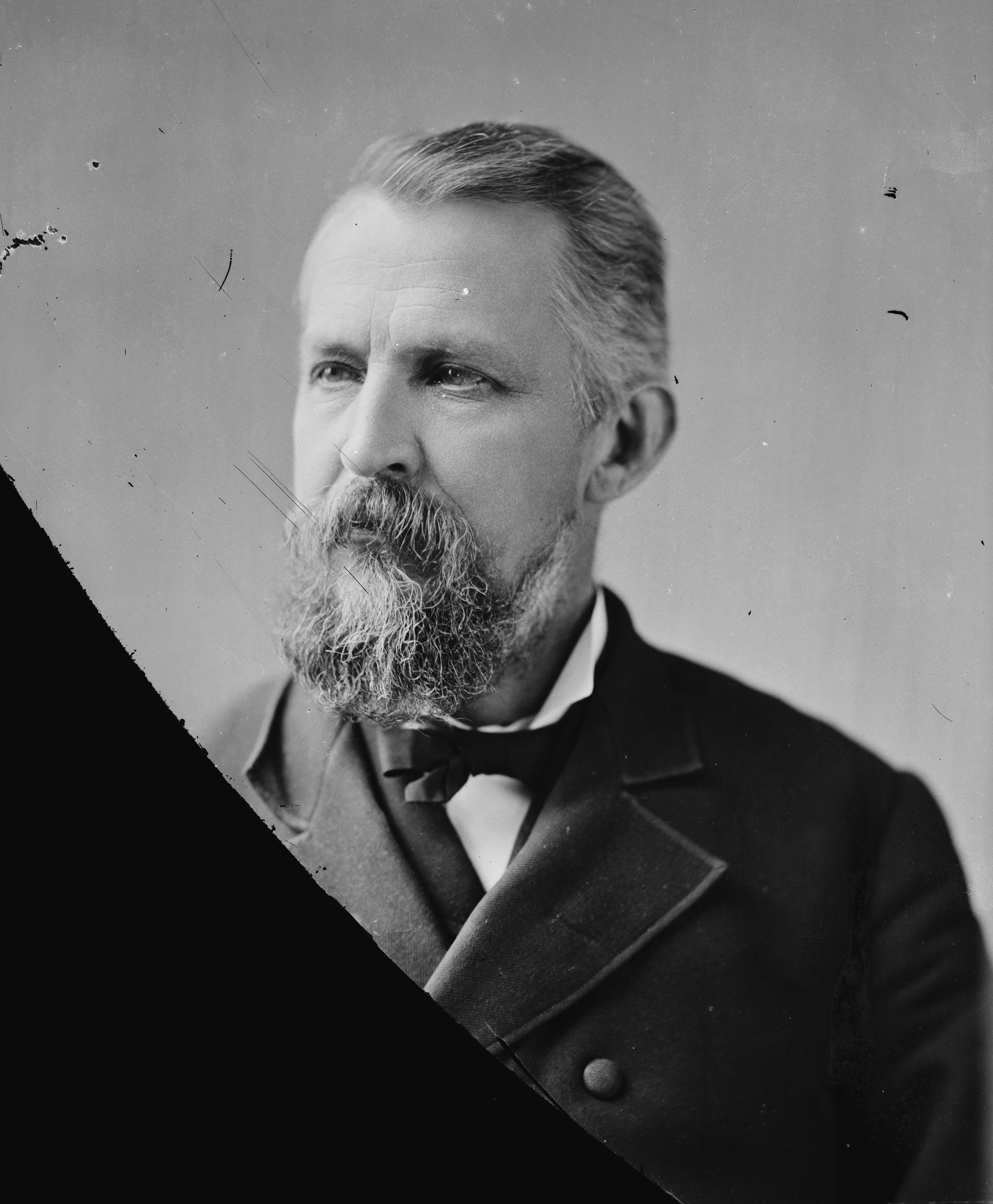
John Randolph Tucker

Upon learning of James Parsons' arrest, Col. Parsons sought the assistance of Charles James Faulkner, a prominent Martinsburg lawyer and United States House Representative from Virginia's 8th congressional district, and of James Murray Mason, a United States Senator from Virginia. Faulkner and Mason both offered their legal services for James Parsons' defense. The Virginia General Assembly pledged its support to Parsons and to Virginia's slaveowners in defending their constitutional rights and to protect them from prosecution. Virginia Governor Henry A. Wise appointed John Randolph Tucker to attend Parsons' trial as a "special commissioner" of Virginia. The dispute between Virginia and Pennsylvania escalated, and on January 31, 1856, an article published in the New York Herald read "Threatened Civil War between Virginia and Pennsylvania."

Col. Parsons, Faulkner, and Tucker traveled to Hollidaysburg for James Parsons' trial. Faulkner provided for Parsons' legal defense, leading to his acquittal as having acted legally under the provisions of the Fugitive Slave Act of 1850.

In September 1856, Faulkner billed Col. Parsons $150 (~$5,375 in 2025) for his legal services. Parsons disputed the charge. In a series of articles in the Virginia Argus, he declared that Faulkner had originally offered his services at no cost; that he had been lauded publicly for his generosity in doing so without ever denying that he had been working pro bono; and that he was practicing "duplicity and deception" in trying to win a reputation in his district through "specious acts of munificence".

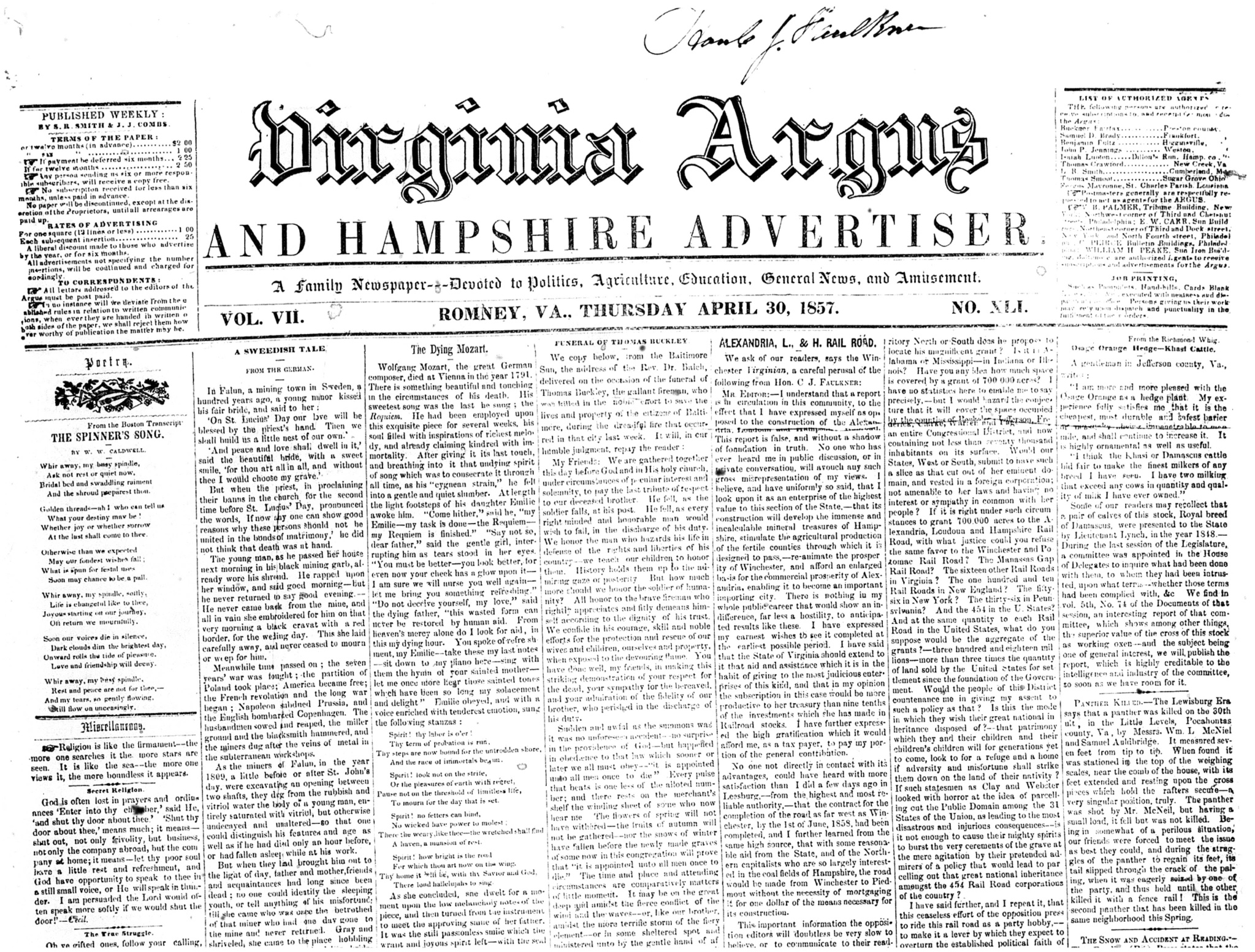
Front page above the fold of the Virginia Argus published on April 30, 1857. This issue is archived at the Library of Virginia.

Faulkner later served as United States Minister to France; following the American Civil War, he again served as a member of the United States House of Representatives, from West Virginia's 2nd congressional district. James Parsons and his brother William Miller Parsons were later proprietors of the Virginia Argus.

== Extant issues ==
Extant issues of the Virginia Argus and Hampshire Advertiser are maintained by four known institutions. The American Antiquarian Society Newspaper Project in Worcester, Massachusetts, maintains an 1852 issue of the newspaper; West Virginia University Libraries in Morgantown, West Virginia, maintain issues dating from 1852, 1853, 1856, 1857, and 1859; the West Virginia State Archives in Charleston, West Virginia, maintain an issue dated July 5, 1851; and the Duke University Libraries in Durham, North Carolina, maintain issues dating between 1858 and 1861. The Library of Virginia in Richmond, Virginia, also maintains microforms of issues of the Virginia Argus dating from 1852, 1853, 1856, 1857, and 1859.

== See also ==
- List of newspapers in West Virginia

== Bibliography ==
- Atkinson, George Wesley; Gibbens, Alvaro Franklin (1890). Prominent Men of West Virginia: Biographical Sketches of Representative Men in Every Honorable Vocation, Including Politics, the Law, Theology, Medicine, Education, Finance, Journalism, Trade, Commerce and Agriculture. Wheeling, West Virginia: W. L. Callin. OCLC 3886825.
- Brannon, Selden W., ed. (1976). Historic Hampshire: A Symposium of Hampshire County and Its People, Past and Present. Parsons, West Virginia: McClain Printing Company. ISBN 978-0-87012-236-1. OCLC 3121468.
- Callahan, James Morton (1923). History of West Virginia, Old and New, Volume 1. The American Historical Society. OCLC 373051. Archived from the original on January 4, 2014.
- Duke University Library (1953). Library Notes, Issues 27-40. Duke University Library. Archived from the original on January 4, 2014.
- MacCabe, Virginia Parsons (1913). Parsons' Family History and Record. Decatur, Illinois: Charles W. Nickey. OCLC 8590919.
- Maxwell, Hu; Swisher, Howard Llewellyn (1897). History of Hampshire County, West Virginia From Its Earliest Settlement to the Present. Morgantown, West Virginia: A. Brown Boughner, Printer. OCLC 680931891. OL 23304577M.
- Munske, Roberta R.; Kerns, Wilmer L., eds. (2004). Hampshire County, West Virginia, 1754–2004. Romney, West Virginia: The Hampshire County 250th Anniversary Committee. ISBN 978-0-9715738-2-6. OCLC 55983178.
- Ritter, Charles F.; Wakelyn, Jon L. (1989). American Legislative Leaders, 1850–1910. Westport, Connecticut: Greenwood Press. ISBN 978-0-313-23943-4. OCLC 18523119. Archived from the original on October 31, 2013.
- Virginia House of Delegates; Virginia General Assembly (1856). Journal of the House of Delegates of the State of Virginia, for the Session of 1855–56. Richmond, Virginia: William F. Ritchie, Public Printer. Archived from the original on January 5, 2014.
- State of West Virginia (1907). West Virginia Governor's Message Submitted to Legislature of 1907 with the Accompanying Reports and Documents Covering the Two Fiscal Years Oct. 1, 1904 to Sept. 30, 1906 in Four Volumes, Volume 4. State of West Virginia. Archived from the original on November 26, 2013.
- West Virginia Department of Archives and History; Lewis, Virgil A. (1906). First Biennial Report of the Department of Archives and History of the State of West Virginia. Charleston, West Virginia: The Tribune Printing Company. Archived from the original on January 4, 2014.
- West Virginia Department of Archives and History (1944). West Virginia History, Volume 6. West Virginia Department of Archives and History. Archived from the original on November 4, 2013.
- West Virginia Library Association; Norona, Delf (1958). West Virginia Imprints, 1790–1863: A Checklist of Books, Newspapers, Periodicals. West Virginia Library Association.
