= Washington Place (West Virginia) =

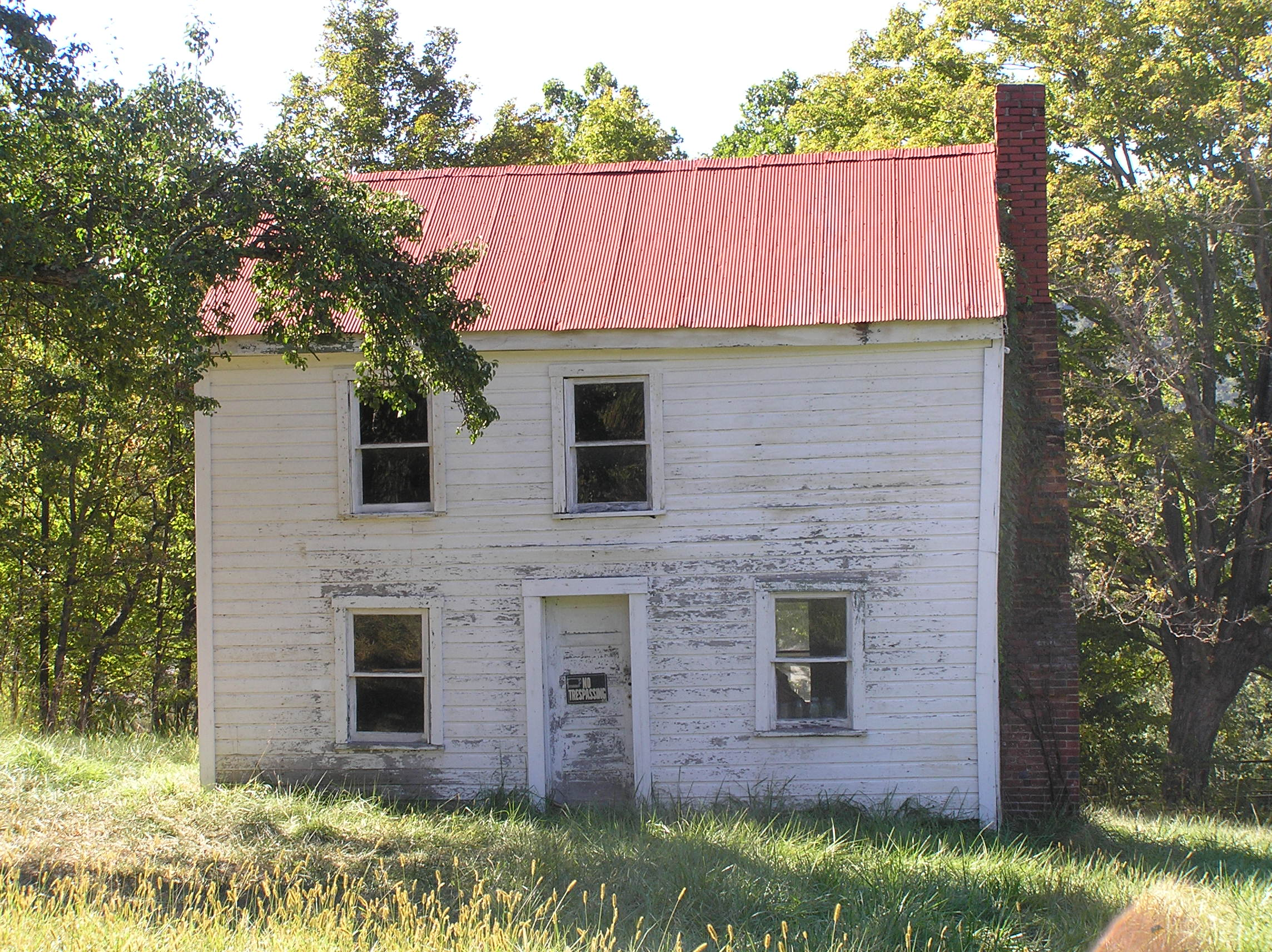
- Washington Place photographed in 2005

- Location within Eastern Panhandle of West Virginia Location within West Virginia Location within the United States
- Alternative names: William Washington House; Washington House

General information
- Type: Residential
- Architectural style: Vernacular
- Location: Cumberland Road (West Virginia Route 28) & Mitchell Street, Romney, West Virginia, United States
- Coordinates: 39.354008°N 78.752485°W
- Completed: c. 1863–1874
- Owner: William and Annie Washington

Washington Place (William Washington House) is one of the first homes built by freed slaves after the Emancipation Proclamation of 1863 in Hampshire County, West Virginia, United States. Washington Place was built by William and Annie Washington in north Romney between 1863 and 1874 on land given to Annie by her former owner, Susan Blue Parsons of Wappocomo plantation. William Washington later acquired other properties on the hills north of Romney along West Virginia Route 28 and became the first African-American land developer in the state of West Virginia. One of his subdivisions is the "Blacks Hill" neighborhood of Romney, adjacent to the Washington Place homestead. Washington Place was bought and restored by Ralph W. Haines, a local attorney and historic preservationist.{{Citation needed}}

== Image gallery ==
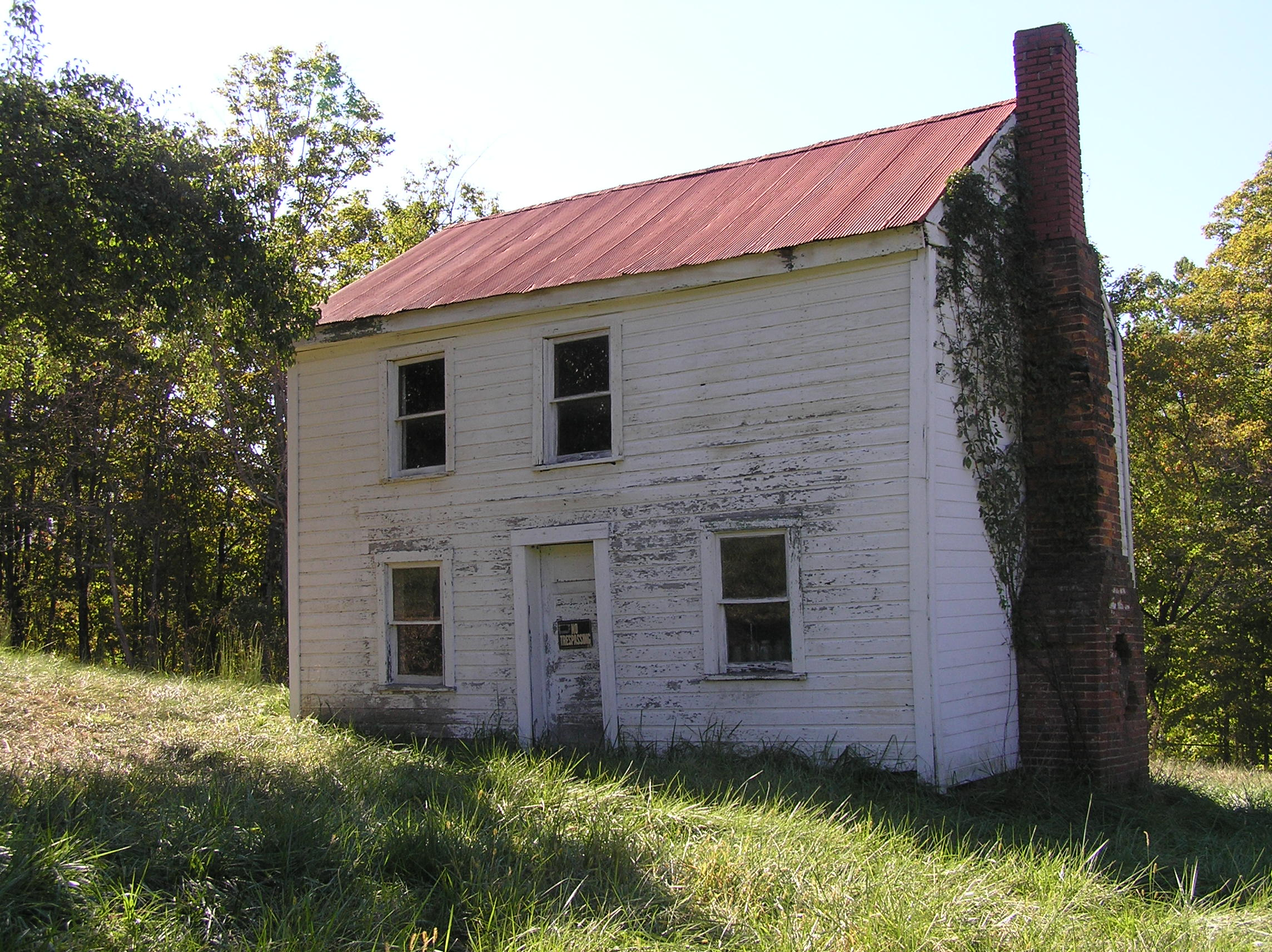

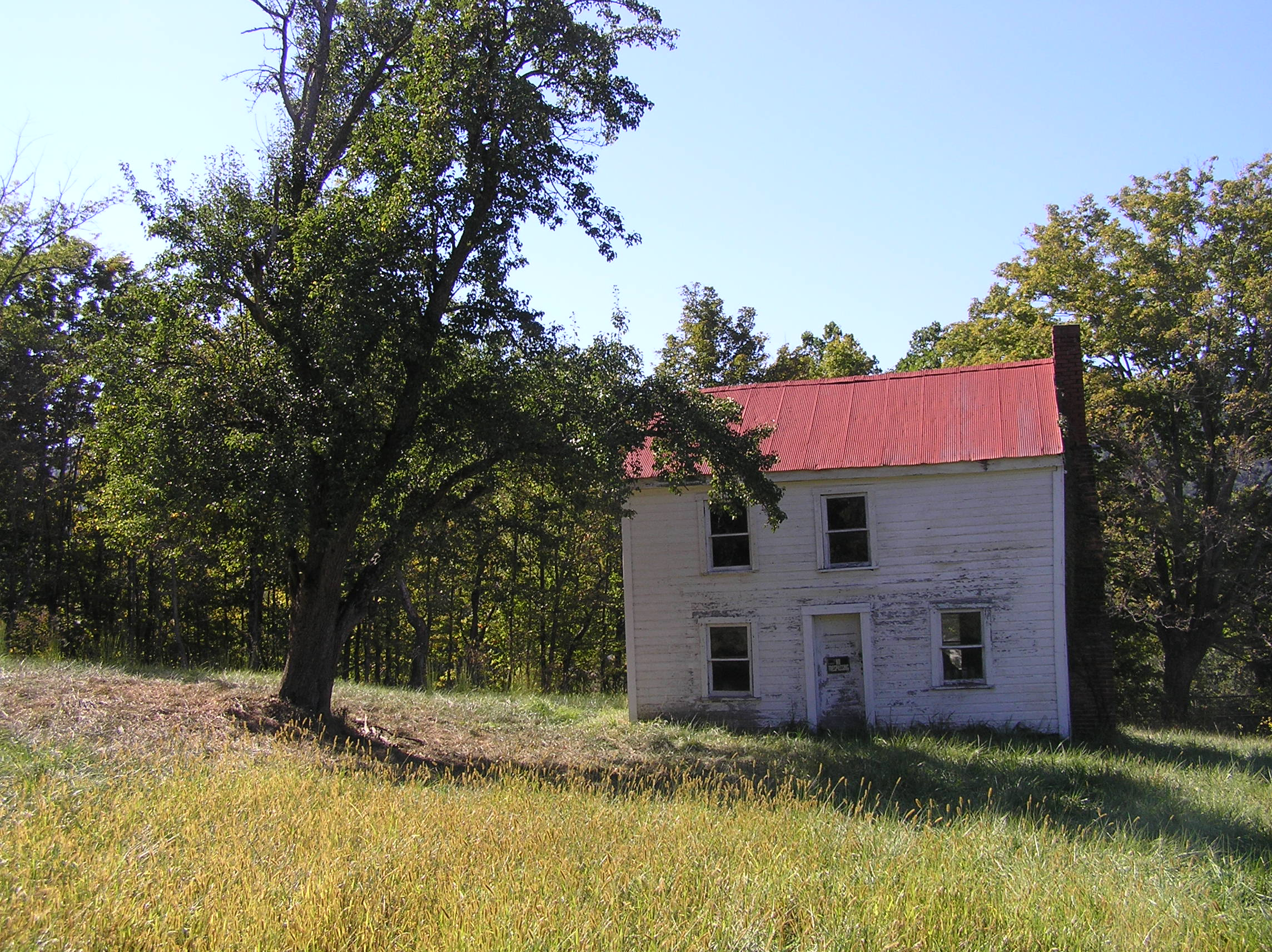

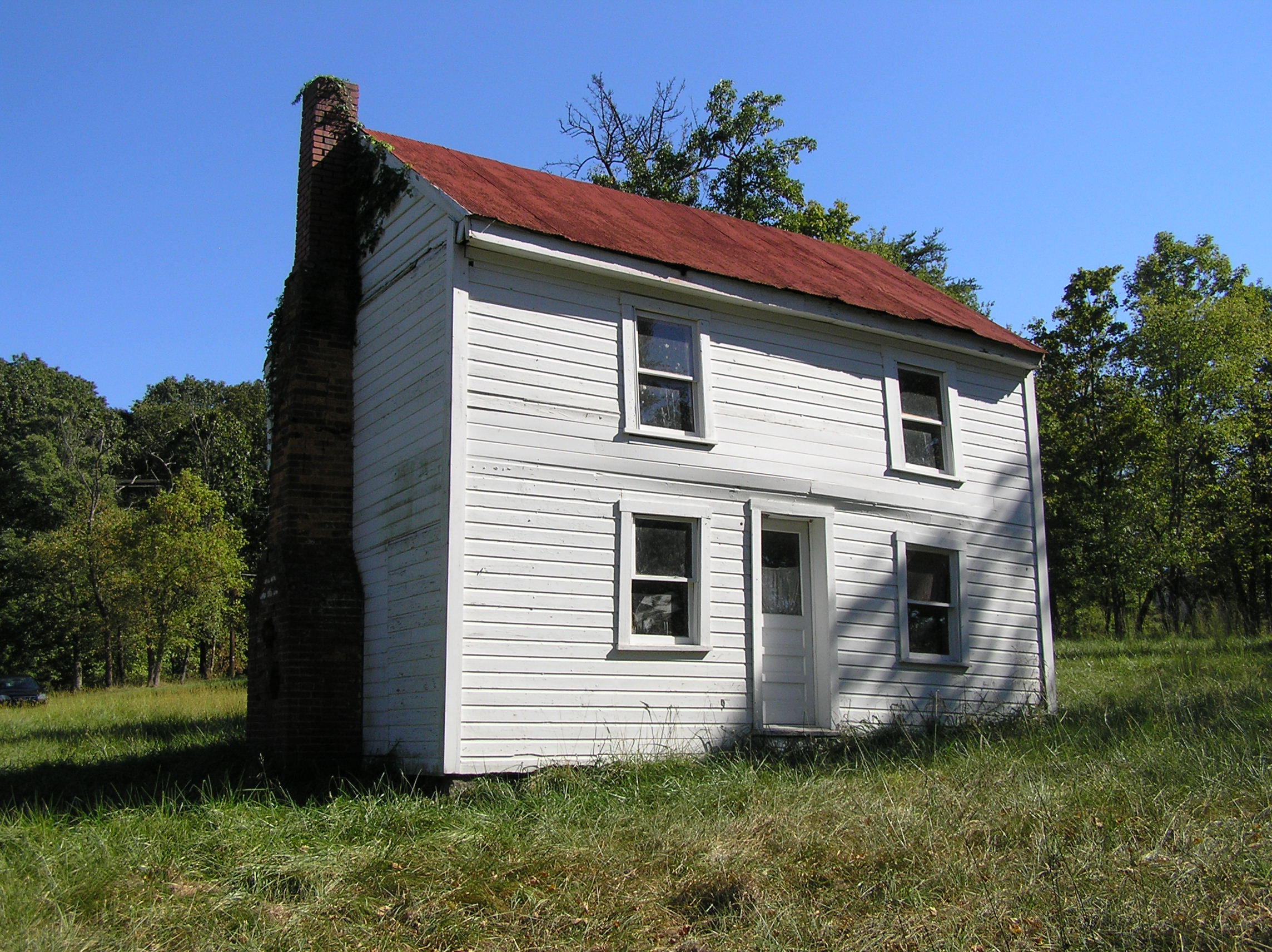

== See also ==
- List of historic sites in Hampshire County, West Virginia
