= Isaac Parsons (Confederate military officer) =

American confederate military officer

Honorable Isaac Parsons

Member of the Virginia House of Delegates from the Hampshire County district
- In office 1854–1857 Serving with Jesse Lupton; Asa Hiett
- Preceded by: James Allen; Thomas B. White
- Succeeded by: Robert Massey Powell; Hugh Parrill

Personal details
- Born: January 7, 1814 Hampshire County, West Virginia (now West Virginia)
- Died: April 24, 1862 (aged 48) Grassy Lick Run, Hampshire County, Virginia (now West Virginia)
- Resting place: Indian Mound Cemetery, Romney, West Virginia, United States
- Spouse: Susan Blue Parsons
- Relations: James Gregg Parsons (father); Mary Catherine Casey (mother); Isaac Parsons (grandfather); William Foreman (great-grandfather); Edna Brady Cornwell (granddaughter)
- Children: Catherine E. Parsons; Isaac Parsons, Jr. Sarah Louise Parsons Brady; James Donaldson Parsons; Mary Susan Parsons Pancake; Virginia B. Parsons Arnold; Garrett Williams Parsons; Burr A. Parsons; Edith Parsons Waddle
- Profession: Planter, politician, and military officer

Military service
- Allegiance: Confederate States of America
- Branch/service: Confederate States Army
- Years of service: 1861–1862 (CSA)
- Rank: Colonel
- Unit: Huckleberry Rangers; Company K 13th Virginia Volunteer Infantry Regiment
- Battles/wars: American Civil War

Isaac Parsons (January 7, 1814 – April 24, 1862) was an American planter, politician, and military officer in the U.S. state of Virginia (now West Virginia). Parsons served as a Justice of the Peace of Hampshire County's District 3 from 1852 to 1853. He later served as a member of the Virginia House of Delegates representing Hampshire County from 1854 until 1857. Parsons was the grandson of Virginia House Delegate Isaac Parsons (1752–1796), the great-grandson of Colonial Virginia military officer William Foreman (died 1777), and the grandfather of First Lady of West Virginia, Edna Brady Cornwell (1868–1958).

Parsons inherited his family's Wappocomo plantation north of Romney. In 1855, fugitive slave Jacob Green escaped from Parsons' Wappocomo plantation to Pennsylvania along with several other slaves. Parsons and his nephews went north to pursue the escapees, resulting in the arrest of his nephew, James "Zip" Parsons III (1831–1893). The arrest and trial of Parsons' nephew caused a dispute between the states of Virginia and Pennsylvania over the latter's refusal to execute the Fugitive Slave Act of 1850. Following the trial, a dispute ensued between Parsons and Charles James Faulkner over legal fees in 1857. At the time of the dispute, Faulkner was a member of the United States House of Representatives from Virginia's 8th congressional district. Parsons declared that Faulkner had originally offered his legal services at no cost during his nephew's trial.

Following the onset of the American Civil War, Parsons served on Hampshire County's "committee for safety". Parsons received permission to raise an independent company of mounted infantry to provide defense along the border. He served as a military officer in the Huckleberry Rangers and Company K of the 13th Virginia Volunteer Infantry Regiment in the Confederate States Army. Parsons died of natural causes following a skirmish with Union Army cavalry at Grassy Lick Run in 1862.

== Early life and family ==
Isaac Parsons was born on January 7, 1814, in Hampshire County, West Virginia (now West Virginia). He was the third son of James Gregg Parsons (1773–1847) and his wife Mary Catherine Casey Parsons (1773–1846). The Parsons family was a prominent American family whose ancestors had arrived to the Thirteen Colonies from England in 1635, and relocated to Hampshire County around 1740. Parsons' paternal grandfather, of which he is a likely namesake, Isaac Parsons (1752–1796) served as a member of the Virginia House of Delegates representing Hampshire County from 1789 until his death in 1796; and operated a public ferry across the South Branch Potomac River. Through his mother, Parsons was a great-grandson of Colonial Virginia military officer William Foreman (died 1777). Parsons was raised through childhood to adulthood on his family's Wappocomo plantation north of Romney.

== Wappocomo ==
Following the death of James Gregg Parsons on January 25, 1847, his last will and testament dated November 7, 1846, and probated February 22, 1847, devised Lot Number 21 including Wappocomo (referred to in the will as the "Casey tract") to his son Colonel Isaac Parsons (1814–1862). Parsons' brother James "Big Jim" Parsons, Jr. (1798–1858), inherited the Collins tract (Lot Number 20) and his other brother David C. Parsons (1803–1860) inherited Lot Number 13. Parsons and his brothers also inherited the nearby "Jake Sugar Rum tract, the McGuire tract, and five town lots in Romney". Parsons eventually acquired Wappocomo plantation outright, and in 1861 he undertook a two-story stone expansion to the main house at Wappocomo. The ballroom in the upper story of this addition served as the scene of many events and parties.

== Political career ==
Following the ratification of the 1851 Constitution of Virginia, Parsons was elected to serve as a justice of the peace for Hampshire County's District 3 in 1852 and 1853. Parsons served in this office alongside David Gibson, T. M. Davis, and Joseph C. Pancake.

Parsons served as a member of the Virginia House of Delegates representing Hampshire County from 1854 until 1857. Parsons represented Hampshire County, which was a multi-member electoral district, in the following sessions of the Virginia House of Delegates: the 1854 session alongside Jesse Lupton; the 1855 session alongside Jesse Lupton; the 1856 session alongside Asa Hiett; and the 1857 session alongside Asa Hiett. Prior to the American Civil War, Parsons was an ardent proponent of Virginia's secession and the passage of an Ordinance of Secession.

== Jacob Green affair ==
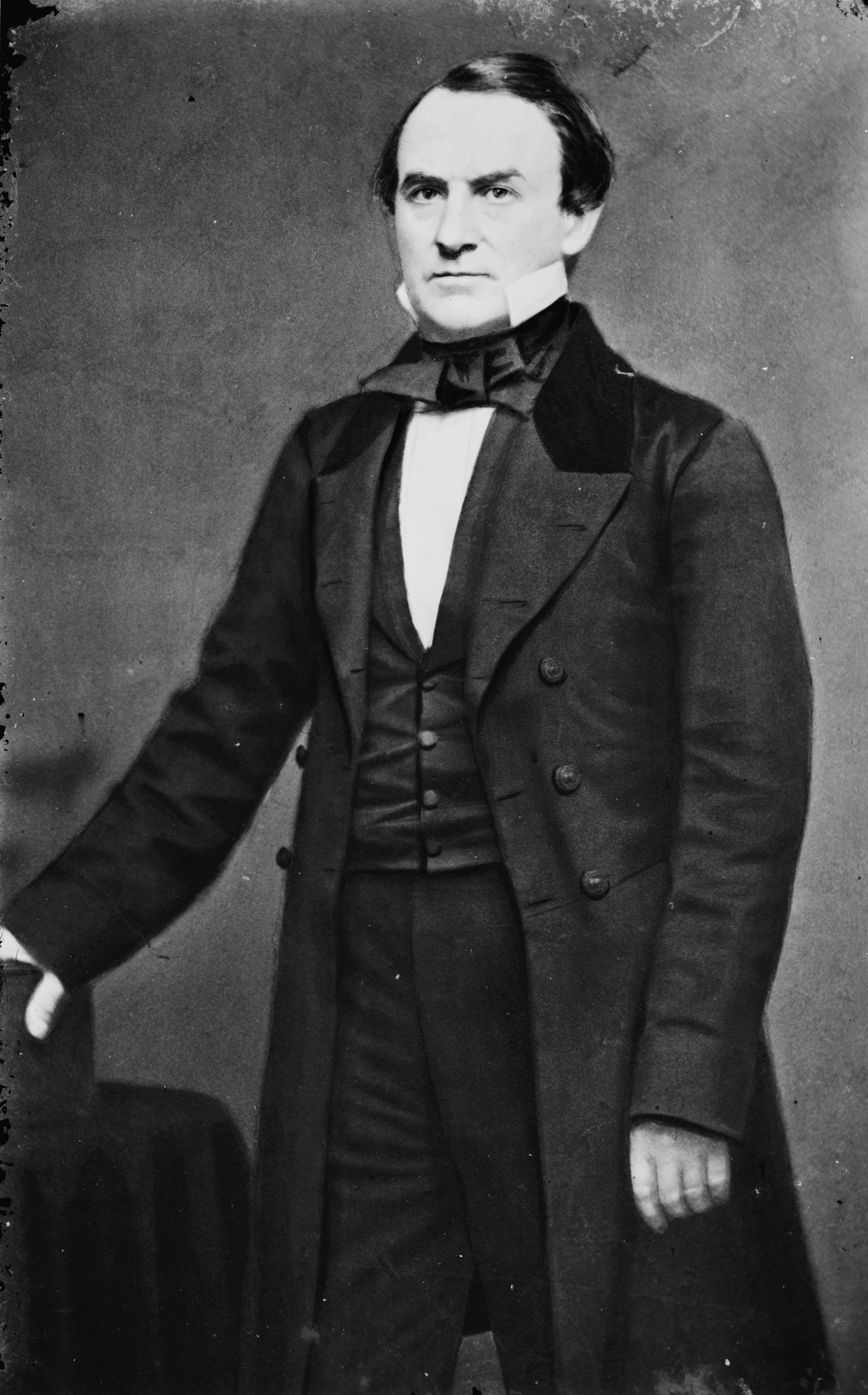
Charles James Faulkner

In August 1855, Jacob Green, a slave owned by Parsons, escaped from Wappocomo farm with four other slaves from neighboring plantations. In October of that year, Green returned to Parsons' plantation in Romney, and persuaded four or five slaves from neighboring farms owned by Parsons family relatives to escape with him to Pennsylvania.

A party of eight to ten men, including Parsons and two of his nephews, James "Zip" Parsons III (1831–1893) and a Mr. Stump, went north in pursuit of the escapees. In the course of the pursuit, they captured two of Stump's escaped slaves, who were sent back to Hampshire County. James Parsons III was the son of Parsons' brother James "Big Jim" Parsons, Jr. (1798–1858), and his wife Elizabeth Miller Parsons. With information obtained from the two recaptured slaves, Parsons went to Johnstown, James Parsons III to Hollidaysburg, and Stump to Altoona, where they hoped to intercept Green as he headed west on the Allegheny Portage Railroad and Main Line Canal toward Pittsburgh. James Parsons III intercepted Green at Hollidaysburg, but local abolitionists thwarted his attempt to capture Green, and he was arrested and arraigned for kidnapping.

Upon learning of the arrest of his nephew, Parsons sought the assistance of Charles James Faulkner, a prominent Martinsburg lawyer and United States House Representative from Virginia's 8th congressional district, and of James Murray Mason, a United States Senator from Virginia. Faulkner and Mason both offered their legal services for James Parsons III's defense. The Virginia General Assembly pledged its support to Parsons and to Virginia's slaveowners in defending their constitutional rights and to protect them from prosecution. Virginia Governor Henry A. Wise appointed John Randolph Tucker to attend Parsons' trial as a "special commissioner" of Virginia. The dispute between Virginia and Pennsylvania escalated, and on January 31, 1856, an article published in the New York Herald read "Threatened Civil War between Virginia and Pennsylvania".

Parsons, Faulkner, and Tucker traveled to Hollidaysburg for James Parsons III's trial. Faulkner provided for Parsons' legal defense, leading to his acquittal as having acted legally under the provisions of the Fugitive Slave Act of 1850.

In September 1856, Faulkner billed Parsons $150 (~$5,375 in 2025) for his legal services. Parsons disputed the charge. In a series of articles in the Virginia Argus and Hampshire Advertiser, he declared that Faulkner had originally offered his services at no cost; that he had been lauded publicly for his generosity in doing so without ever denying that he had been working pro bono; and that he was practicing "duplicity and deception" in trying to win a reputation in his district through "specious acts of munificence".

James Parsons III and his brother William Miller Parsons (born 1835) were later proprietors of the Virginia Argus and Hampshire Advertiser. In a series of articles published in the May 14 and 21, 1857, issues of the Virginia Argus, Parsons chronicled the 1855 arrest of his nephew for attempting to capture his fugitive slave and the resulting dispute between the Parsons family and Faulkner over legal fees in 1857.

== American Civil War ==
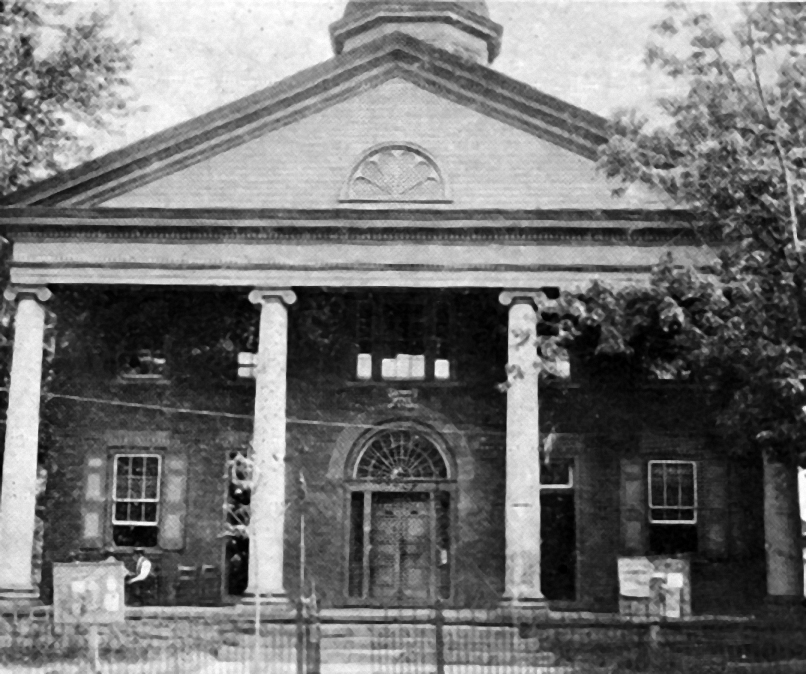
Hampshire County Courthouse

Following the onset of the American Civil War, Parsons began serving on Hampshire County's "committee for safety". Parsons served on the "committee for safety" alongside James Dillon Armstrong, John M. Pancake, David Gibson, Dr. S. R. Lupton, John C. Heiskell, J. W. Marshall, W. A. Vance, R. K. Sheetz, Angus William McDonald, James Sheetz, John T. Pierce, James W. Albin, Charles Blue, Robert Hook, R. B. Sherrard, G. W. Gore, George William Washington, and John Johnson. The "committee for safety" continued to meet until May 29, 1861. Parsons, Pancake, and Armstrong were permitted by the Hampshire County Court to execute bonds for and on behalf of the county to raise money to fund "war purposes".

On May 18, 1861, the Hampshire Guards and the Frontier Riflemen convened in front of the Hampshire County Courthouse in Romney before departing to fight in defense of the Confederate States of America. Parsons and a dozen of his men led the wagon train conveying these volunteers to Green Spring on the Baltimore and Ohio Railroad mainline, where Parsons and the volunteers departed by train to Harpers Ferry.

Parsons traveled to Richmond, where he received permission to raise an independent company of mounted infantry to provide defense along the border. Parsons set about enrolling volunteers, and within a short period of time, he enlisted approximately 30 men. Following its organization, the company became known as the Huckleberry Rangers of the Confederate States Army's 13th Virginia Volunteer Infantry Regiment. The following personnel were elected to serve in leadership positions within the company: Parsons as its captain in command; John Blue, first lieutenant; and his son Isaac Parsons, Jr., second lieutenant. Parsons and his company utilized flintlock muskets, which they had retrieved from the loft of the courthouse, and additional sabres and flintlock horse pistols which had last been used during the American Revolutionary War. Parsons provided Lt. Blue with a Minié ball rifle reportedly seized from John Brown at Harpers Ferry.

Parsons again traveled to Richmond with a supply of cattle, and returned to his company's camp on the North River in Hampshire County around November 15, 1861. Upon his return, Parsons was anxious to learn about the condition of his family and property at Wappocomo and needed an additional change of clothing and a blanket. Accompanied by Lt. Blue and Adam Parrish, Parsons traveled west along the Northwestern Turnpike to around Pleasant Dale, where they set about traversing a series of roads and paths until nighttime when they reached Sugar Hollow 2 miles (3.2 km) north of Romney. Parsons stayed behind in the hollow while Lt. Blue and Parrish started out for Wappocomo to retrieve a set of Parsons' clothes. Lt. Blue and Parrish approached Wappocomo with the knowledge that Union Army forces kept a guard at the main house there day and night. Lt. Blue circled around to the rear of the mansion at Wappocomo and knocked on the window of his uncle, Garrett W. Blue, who was residing with Parsons' family. Blue warned his nephew about the Union Army soldiers possibly stationed on the home's front porch, and he subsequently fetched Parsons' daughter Kate, who provided Lt. Blue with a parcel for her father.

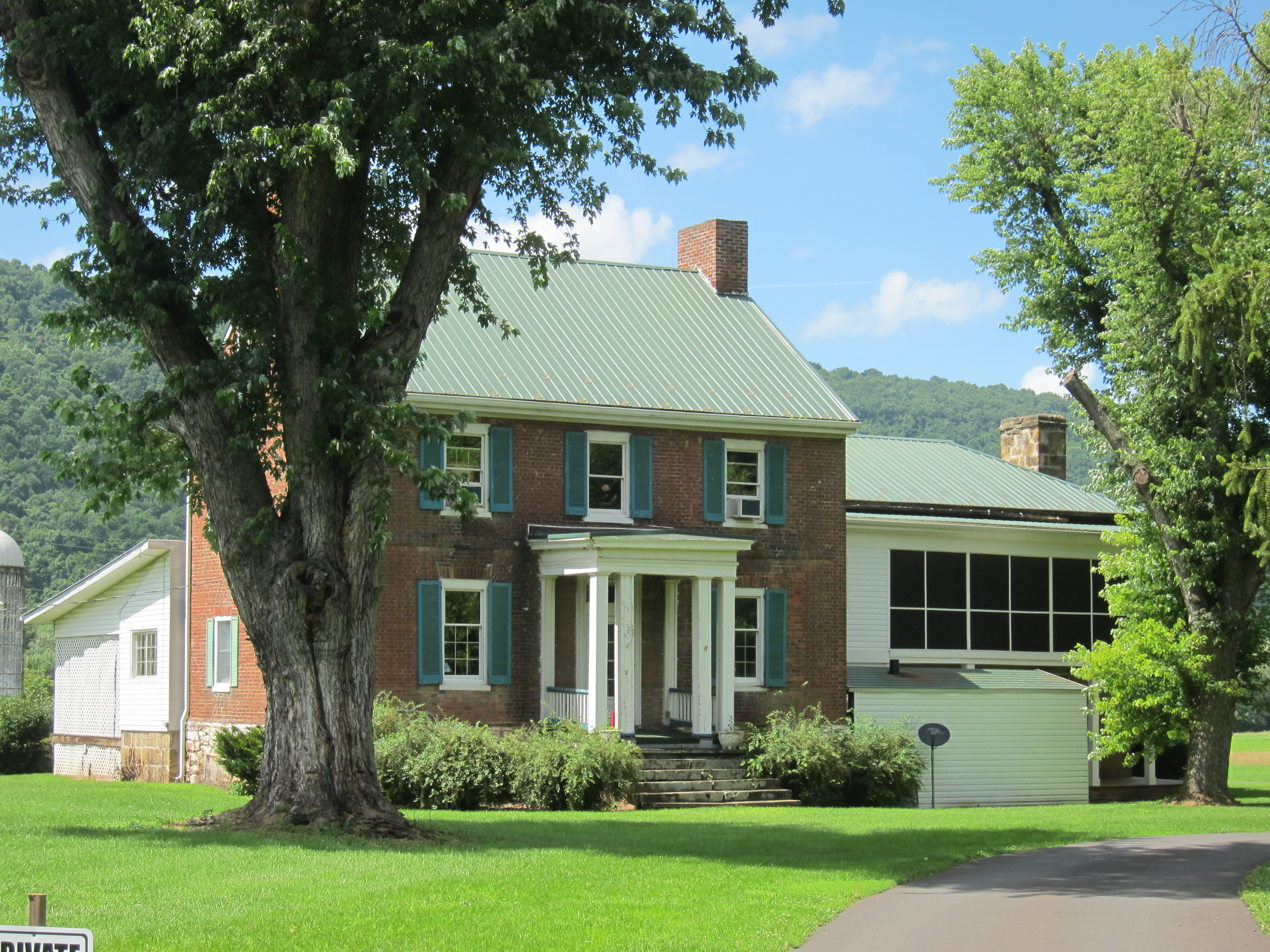
Wappocomo, viewed from Cumberland Road (West Virginia Route 28) in July 2013

Lt. Blue and Parrish returned to Sugar Hollow where Parsons was awaiting them, and Parsons set about locating pine from which to make torches to light their way out of the hollow. Parsons carried with him a small hatchet, and he began splitting pine in the darkness to fashion a torch. Parsons accidentally struck himself in the knee with his hatchet, and Lt. Blue applied a handkerchief to the wound to stop its bleeding. The three men traveled through the dark and rain to the nearby home of Frank Carter, where they ate and dried their clothes by the fire. The following morning, the three men mounted their horses and traveled to Rev. Harris' home, where Parsons and Lt. Blue parted with Parrish. Parsons and Lt. Blue continued east over Town Hill and reached George Thompson's residence on the Little Cacapon River, which had risen due to the previous night's rainfall. Parsons and Lt. Blue remained with Thompson for two days until the Little Cacapon River subsided, and traveled to Blue's Gap, where they set up camp. There, Lt. Blue received orders from Col. Angus William McDonald to carry out an expedition to Romney for General Stonewall Jackson to ascertain the number of Union Army infantry, cavalry, and artillery present in and around the town. Lt. Blue departed for Romney with Parsons' son Isaac Parsons, Jr., and W. V. Parsons accompanying him. Throughout 1861, Parsons "gratuitously" provided Confederate soldiers with food at his table and horses from his stables at his Wappocomo plantation.

In 1862, Parsons had part of his family moved from their Wappocomo residence to Shull's Gap on the Lost River in Hardy County. Romney physician Dr. Lupton and his wife were also residing with Parsons' family at Shull's Gap. In March, Union Army forces were no closer to Romney than Green Spring, which allowed Parsons and his wife Susan Blue Parsons to return to their home at Wappocomo with their younger children. Parsons' eldest daughters Kate and Sallie stayed behind with his son Isaac Parsons, Jr., who had arrived from New Market, and a Mrs. Dawson and Dr. Lupton and his wife. On March 24, 1862, Parsons' eldest child and daughter Kate died. Despite recovering from illness, Lt. Blue carried the news of Kate's death and met Parsons halfway to Romney. Parsons instructed Lt. Blue to proceed on to Romney where he delivered the news to his wife Susan. The Parsons no longer felt safe in Romney, and returned to Shull's Gap. Parsons and Lt. Blue traveled to Harrisonburg, where they remained for a few days, and decided to return to Hampshire County. Lt. Blue traveled to his family's residence 4 miles (6.4 km) north of Romney, and Parsons to his residence at Wappocomo plantation. Lt. Blue was subsequently captured by Union Army forces and held at the Wirgman Building, from which he later escaped.

Parsons, his sons, and other Confederate soldiers encountered Union Army cavalry along Grassy Lick Run south of Romney on April 24, 1862. Parsons carried a double-barreled shotgun, and proceeded to fire his weapon at the Union forces at close range. As Parsons made his escape from the Union Army forces, he saw his son fired upon as he ran across the road, and supposed he had been killed. He traveled to the home of a Mr. Hott, and told him of the news of his son's possible death. Parsons became pale and was helped down from his horse by Hott's sons, so he would not fall. According to Hott, Parsons died moments later.

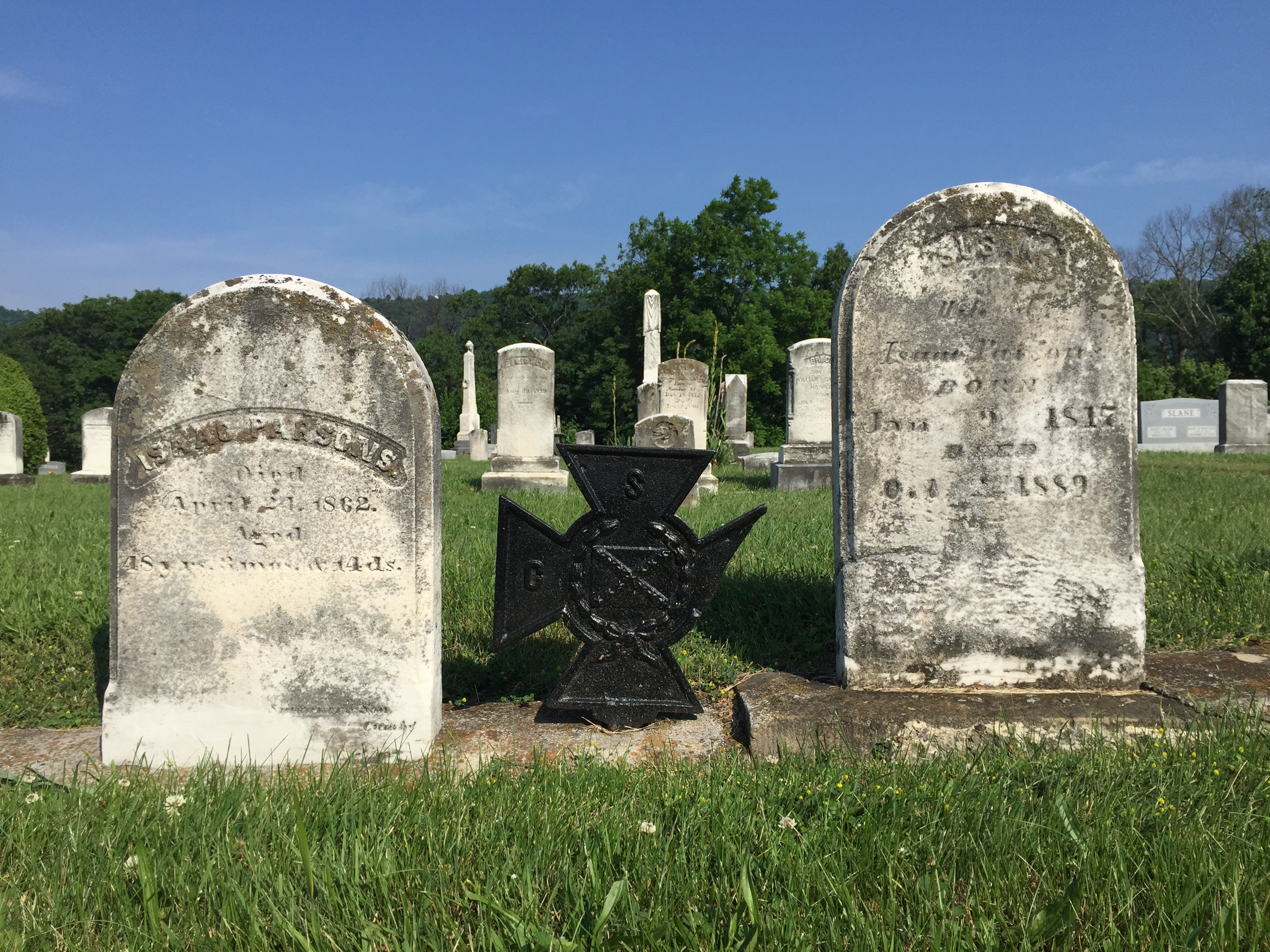
Gravestones of Parsons (left) and his wife Susan Blue Parsons (right) at Indian Mound Cemetery in Romney

Parsons' body was transferred to Wappocomo for burial in the Parsons family burial ground. Union Army forces assumed Parsons had died in the skirmish along Grassy Lick Run, and claimed the right to examine his body to search for wounds which would serve as sufficient cause to destroy his property. Professor Nelson, a Presbyterian minister and instructor at the Potomac Academy, was a friend of the Parsons family, and denied Union Army officials access to Parsons' body. As a compromise, Professor Nelson allowed Union Army officers to be present in the room while Parsons' corpse was examined. No wounds were found on Parsons' body, and his remains were interred in the Parsons family burial ground at Indian Mound Cemetery. On April 26, 1862, acting Quartermaster Lt. F. H. Morse completed the death certificate for Parsons although the circumstances of Parsons' death were not recorded. Captain William Firey of Company B, 1st Maryland Cavalry and Captain C. W. Shearer of Company B, 3rd Maryland Infantry, Potomac Home Brigade were present for the examination of Parsons' body and attested there was "no evidence of gun-shot wounds or any other violence on him". Witnesses present at the examination were William Vance and George William Washington.

Parsons drafted his own will and testament, and it was proved without issue, and later cited in the Supreme Court of Appeals of West Virginia case French v. French (1877). His wife Susan Blue Parsons died on October 2, 1889 and was interred alongside Parsons at Indian Mound Cemetery. In her Parsons' Family History and Record (1913), Parsons' relative and family genealogist Virginia Parsons MacCabe said of Parsons: "he was broad minded and conservative, gifted with good common sense and judgment, his honesty and integrity was unimpeachable."

== Personal life ==
Parsons married Susan Blue (1817–1889) on May 18, 1836. Susan Blue was born in Hampshire County on January 9, 1817, and was the daughter of Uriah Blue, Jr., and his wife M. Elizabeth Donaldson Blue. Parsons and his wife Susan had nine children consisting of four sons and five daughters. Through his daughter Sarah Louise, Parsons was the grandfather of Edna Brady Cornwell (1868–1960), who served as First Lady of West Virginia from 1917 until 1921 during her husband John J. Cornwell's (1867–1953) term as Governor of West Virginia.

Name	Birth date	Death date	Spouse
Catherine E. "Kate" Parsons	May 1, 1837	March 24, 1862	Unmarried
Isaac Parsons, Jr.	December 1, 1838	September 11, 1892	Emma C. Waddle, married on November 12, 1867
Sarah Louise Parsons Brady	June 10, 1841	1923	Isaac T. Brady, married on September 18, 1865
James Donaldson Parsons	October 21, 1843		Sarah Maria Pancake, married on April 19, 1871
Mary Susan Parsons Pancake	December 5, 1847	January 22, 1923	Joseph A. Pancake, married on March 30, 1870
Virginia B. Parsons Arnold	September 15, 1849	December 20, 1891	George S. Arnold, married on June 8, 1882
Garrett Williams Parsons	May 13, 1852	September 29, 1935	Mary Avery Covell, married on November 12, 1878 (Covell was the daughter of West Virginia Schools for the Deaf and Blind principal John Collins Covell)
Burr A. Parsons	April 21, 1855	December 8, 1862	Unmarried
Edith Parsons Waddle	January 1, 1858	November 27, 1910	Julius Samuel Waddle, married on June 3, 1891

== Bibliography ==
- Blue, John (1994). Daniel P. Oates (ed.). Hanging Rock Rebel: Lt. John Blue's War in West Virginia and the Shenandoah Valley. Shippensburg, Pennsylvania: Burd Street Press. ISBN 978-0-942597-62-2. OCLC 29254746. Archived from the original on May 1, 2014.
- Brannon, Selden W., ed. (1976). Historic Hampshire: A Symposium of Hampshire County and Its People, Past and Present. Parsons, West Virginia: McClain Printing Company. ISBN 978-0-87012-236-1. OCLC 3121468.
- Firelands Historical Society (1907). The Firelands Pioneer, Volumes 16-19. Vol. 16–19. Norwalk, Ohio: Firelands Historical Society. Archived from the original on May 2, 2014.
- MacCabe, Virginia Parsons (1913). Parsons' Family History and Record. Decatur, Illinois: Charles W. Nickey. OCLC 8590919.
- Maxwell, Hu; Swisher, Howard Llewellyn (1897). History of Hampshire County, West Virginia From Its Earliest Settlement to the Present. Morgantown, West Virginia: A. Brown Boughner, Printer. OCLC 680931891. OL 23304577M.
- Munske, Roberta R.; Kerns, Wilmer L., eds. (2004). Hampshire County, West Virginia, 1754–2004. Romney, West Virginia: The Hampshire County 250th Anniversary Committee. ISBN 978-0-9715738-2-6. OCLC 55983178.
- Supreme Court of Appeals of West Virginia (1879). Report of Cases Determined in the Supreme Court of Appeals of the State of West Virginia, Volume 14. West Publishing Company. Archived from the original on May 1, 2014.
- Virginia House of Delegates (1856). "Journal of the House of Delegates of the State of Virginia for the Session of 1855–56". House Journal. 1829/30-1940: House documents. Richmond, Virginia: William F. Ritchie, Public Printer. hdl:2027/nyp.33433014925733. OCLC 49385061. Archived from the original on October 29, 2020 – via HathiTrust.
- Zimmerman, Courtney Fint; Aurora Research Associates, Hampshire County Landmarks Commission (August 24, 2012). National Register of Historic Places Registration Form: Valley View (PDF). United States Department of the Interior, National Park Service. Archived (PDF) from the original on December 13, 2013.

Virginia House of Delegates
Preceded by James Allen; Thomas B. White	Member of the Virginia House of Delegates from Hampshire County; 1854 – 1857; Served alongside: Jesse Lupton; Asa Hiett	Succeeded by Robert Massey Powell; Hugh Parrill
