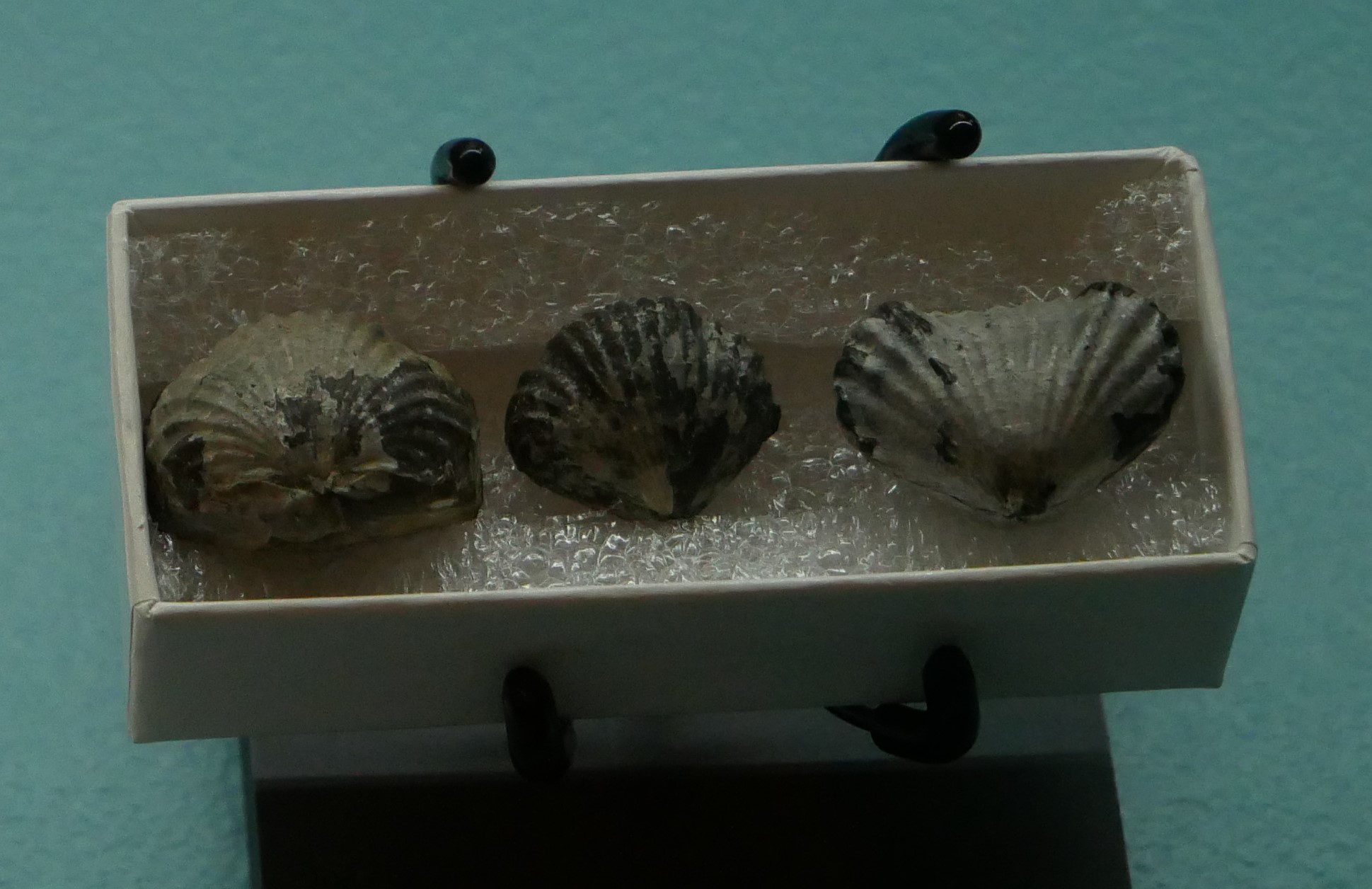

Scientific classification
- Domain: Eukaryota
- Kingdom: Animalia
- Phylum: Brachiopoda
- Class: Rhynchonellata
- Order: Rhynchonellida
- Family: †Trigonirhynchiidae
- Subfamily: †Trigonirhynchiinae
- Genus: †Camarotoechia; Hall & Clarke, 1893

Species
- See text

= Camarotoechia =

Camarotoechia Temporal range: Late Ordovician-Mid Permian ~460–273 Ma

Extinct genus of brachiopods

Camarotoechia is an extinct genus of brachiopods found in Paleozoic strata.

== Taxonomy ==
Cherkesova (2007) reassigns two taxa, "radiata" and "omaliusi", that Nalivkin had placed in Camarotoechia, to Sinotectirostrum as a new combination for a species and a subspecies respectively. The type of Camarotoechia is perhaps Atrypa congretata Conrad, 1841. The species †Camarotoechia elegans is from the Ordovician and Silurian of the Siberian Platform. It includes one subspecies Camarotoechia elegans forma ramosa.

=== Species ===
The following species of Camarotoechia have been described:

- C. bimesiornata
- C. dotis (Floresta Formation, Colombia)
- C. elegans (Siberia)
- C. haraganensis
- C. latisinuata
- C. tethys
