= Isaac Parsons (Virginia politician) =

American slave owner and politician

Honorable Isaac Parsons

Member of the Virginia House of Delegates from the Hampshire County district
- In office 1789–1796 Serving with Isaac Miller; Elias Poston; Francis White; Alexander King
- Preceded by: Samuel Dew; Robert Parker
- Succeeded by: Fielding Calmes

Personal details
- Born: January 27, 1752 Hampshire County, Colony of Virginia (now West Virginia)
- Died: August 25, 1796 (aged 44) South Branch Potomac River; Hampshire County, Virginia (now West Virginia)
- Party: Federalist Party
- Spouse: Mary E. Ellender Gregg
- Relations: Thomas Parsons (father); Parthenia Baldwin (mother); Isaac Parsons (grandson)
- Children: James Gregg Parsons; David Parsons
- Profession: Planter, politician, and militia officer

Military service
- Allegiance: United States
- Branch/service: Virginia militia Hampshire County militia
- Rank: Captain
- Battles/wars: American Revolutionary War

Isaac Parsons (January 27, 1752 – August 25, 1796) was an American slave owner, politician, and militia officer in the U.S. state of Virginia (now West Virginia). Parsons served as a member of the Virginia House of Delegates representing Hampshire County from 1789 until his death in 1796. Following an act of the Virginia General Assembly in 1789, Parsons was appointed to serve as a trustee for the town of Romney. In 1790, Parsons began serving as a justice for Hampshire County. He served as a captain in command of a company in the Virginia militia during the American Revolutionary War and continued to serve as a captain in the Hampshire County militia following the war. Parsons operated a public ferry across the South Branch Potomac River, and later died from drowning in the river in 1796. Parsons was the grandfather of Isaac Parsons (1814–1862), who also represented Hampshire County in the Virginia House of Delegates and served as an officer in the Confederate States Army.

== Early life and family ==
Isaac Parsons was born on January 27, 1752, in Hampshire County, Virginia (now West Virginia). Parsons was the third son of Thomas Parsons and his wife Parthenia Baldwin (also spelled Bayldwin) Parsons. The Parsons family was a prominent family whose ancestors arrived to the Thirteen Colonies from England in 1635 and relocated to Hampshire County around 1740. Parsons' father settled on the Eastern Shore of Maryland in 1725 prior to relocating to Hampshire County, Virginia.

== Landholdings ==
Following the death of his father Thomas Parsons between the date of his will and testament on May 27, 1771, and his will's recording on March 10, 1772, Parsons inherited a plantation on Lot Number 16 of the "South Branch Survey" of Thomas Fairfax, 6th Lord Fairfax of Cameron's Northern Neck Proprietary and other valuable lands in Hampshire County and in the present-day counties of Hardy and Grant. Parsons and his brother Baldwin also received land their father had acquired from Luke Collins, which was divided between Parsons and his brother by Nathaniel Kuykendall, John Foreman, and William Foreman. By 1778, Parsons owned 161 acres (65 ha; 0.252 sq mi) of Lot Number 16 and all of Lot Number 17 of Lord Fairfax's "South Branch Survey".

By 1790, Parsons also owned the corner of Lot Number 1 within the town of Romney. In 1795, Parsons acquired an additional 100 acres (40 ha; 0.16 sq mi) along the South Branch Potomac River. Parsons' Lot 16 property along the South Branch Potomac River was later purchased by David Gibson in 1836, after which Gibson established his Sycamore Dale plantation there.

=== Ferry service ===
Parsons petitioned the Virginia General Assembly to establish a public ferry across the South Branch Potomac River, thus connecting his property on both sides of the river. In October 1786, the Virginia General Assembly passed an act establishing the public ferry at Parsons' property near the present site of the U.S. Route 50 bridge west of Romney. The assembly's act set the ferry's toll at three pence and three farthings per man, and the same price per horse. By 1790, Parsons was continuing the operation of the ferry, which had become known as "Parson's Ferry". On December 26, 1792, the Virginia General Assembly passed an additional act for the settlement and regulation of public ferries. The assembly's act mandated that Parsons' ferry be "constantly kept" at its location, and established its toll amounting to six cents per man, and six cents per horse.

== Political and military careers ==
During the American Revolutionary War, Parsons served as a captain in command of a company under the charge of Major Vincent Williams in the Virginia militia. By December 11, 1788, Parsons was again serving as a captain in command of a company in the Hampshire County militia.

Parsons served as a member of the Virginia House of Delegates representing Hampshire County from 1789 until his death on August 25, 1796. Parsons represented Hampshire County, which was a multi-member electoral district, in the Virginia House of Delegates. During the October 19 – December 19, 1789, session, Parsons served alongside Elias Poston and Isaac Miller. In the sessions between 1790 and 1793, Parsons served alongside Elias Poston. Parsons served alongside Francis White during the 1794 session. During the 1795 session, he again served alongside Elias Poston. Parsons died on August 25, 1796, before the November 8 – December 27, 1796, session of the Virginia House of Delegates, where he was to have served alongside Alexander King. Parsons' seat was filled by Fielding Calmes, who served out Parsons' term during this session. During his final two sessions in the Virginia House of Delegates in 1794 and 1795, Parsons was a member of the Federalist Party.

By February 14, 1788, Parsons had been appointed as an appraiser of property in Hampshire County by an act of the Virginia General Assembly. On December 4, 1789, Parsons was again appointed by an act of the Virginia General Assembly to serve as a trustee of the town of Romney. Parsons served as a trustee alongside Isaac Miller, Andrew Wodrow, Stephen Colvin, Jonathan Purcell, Nicholas Casey, William McGuire, Perez Drew and James Murphy. Parsons and his fellow trustees were given authority by the Virginia General Assembly to settle disputes regarding the town's land lots and to "open and clear" the town's "streets and lanes" in accordance with the original survey and plan for Romney. In 1790, Parsons was either elected or appointed as a justice for Hampshire County alongside Jonathan Purcell, James Martin, Cornelius Ferrel, Edward McCarty, Solomon Jones, and Elias Poston. Parsons died on August 25, 1796; according to tradition, he died from drowning in the South Branch Potomac River.

== Personal life ==
Parsons was married on April 23, 1772, to Mary E. Ellender Gregg. Mary E. Ellender Gregg was born on February 27, 1756. Parsons and his wife had two sons: James Gregg Parsons (1773–1847), married to Mary Catherine Casey in 1795, and David Parsons (1775-1857), married to Catherine Miller.

== Bibliography ==
- Brannon, Selden W., ed. (1976). Historic Hampshire: A Symposium of Hampshire County and Its People, Past and Present. Parsons, West Virginia: McClain Printing Company. ISBN 978-0-87012-236-1. OCLC 3121468.
- Federal Writers' Project (1937). Historic Romney 1762–1937. Romney, West Virginia: Federal Writers' Project, The Town Council of Romney, West Virginia. OCLC 2006735. Archived from the original on January 1, 2014.
- Hening, William Waller (1823a). The Statutes at Large: Being a Collection of All the Laws of Virginia, from the First Session of the Legislature in the Year 1619 : Published Pursuant to an Act of the General Assembly of Virginia, Passed on the Fifth Day of February One Thousand Eight Hundred and Eight, Volume 12. New York City, New York: R. & W. & G. Bartow. OCLC 16810101. Archived from the original on June 24, 2016.
- Hening, William Waller (1823b). The Statutes at Large: Being a Collection of All the Laws of Virginia, from the First Session of the Legislature in the Year 1619 : Published Pursuant to an Act of the General Assembly of Virginia, Passed on the Fifth Day of February One Thousand Eight Hundred and Eight, Volume 13. New York City, New York: R. & W. & G. Bartow. OCLC 16810101. Archived from the original on January 11, 2014.
- Horton, Vicki Bidinger (2009). Hampshire County, Virginia (Now West Virginia): Minute Book Abstracts, 1788–1802, Volume 1. Baltimore, Maryland: Genealogical Publishing Company. ISBN 978-0-8063-4535-2. OCLC 43442868. Archived from the original on January 1, 2014.
- Lewis, Virgil Anson (1889). History of West Virginia: In Two Parts. Philadelphia: Hubbard Brothers. OCLC 4270768.
- Johnston, Ross B. (1977). West Virginians in the American Revolution. Baltimore, Maryland: Genealogical Publishing Company. ISBN 978-0-8063-0762-6. OCLC 3146116. Archived from the original on January 11, 2014.
- Lewis, Virgil Anson (1892). Southern Historical Magazine: Devoted to History, Genealogy, Biography, Archæology and Kindred Subjects, Volume 1. Charleston, West Virginia: Virgil Anson Lewis. OCLC 8188307. Archived from the original on January 1, 2014.
- MacCabe, Virginia Parsons (1913). Parsons' Family History and Record. Decatur, Illinois: Charles W. Nickey. OCLC 8590919.
- Maxwell, Hu; Swisher, Howard Llewellyn (1897). History of Hampshire County, West Virginia From Its Earliest Settlement to the Present. Morgantown, West Virginia: A. Brown Boughner, Printer. OCLC 680931891. OL 23304577M.
- Munske, Roberta R.; Kerns, Wilmer L., eds. (2004). Hampshire County, West Virginia, 1754–2004. Romney, West Virginia: The Hampshire County 250th Anniversary Committee. ISBN 978-0-9715738-2-6. OCLC 55983178.
- Shepherd, Samuel; Hening, William Waller (1835). Volume 1 of The Statutes at Large of Virginia: From October Session 1792, to December Session 1806 [i.e. 1807], Inclusive, in Three Volumes, (new Series,) Being a Continuation of Hening. Richmond, Virginia: S. Shepherd. OCLC 80445062. Archived from the original on January 11, 2014.
- Virginia House of Delegates; Virginia General Assembly (1828). Journal of the House of Delegates of the Commonwealth of Virginia; Begun and Holden in the City of Richmond, In the County of Henrico. Thomas W. White. Archived from the original on January 11, 2014.
- Virginia State Library (1917). Report of the Virginia State Library, Volumes 13-15. Virginia State Library, Division of Purchase and Printing. Archived from the original on January 5, 2014.
- Zimmerman, Courtney Fint; Aurora Research Associates, Hampshire County Landmarks Commission (August 24, 2012). National Register of Historic Places Registration Form: Valley View (PDF). United States Department of the Interior, National Park Service. Archived (PDF) from the original on December 13, 2013.

Virginia House of Delegates
Preceded by Samuel Dew; Robert Parker	Member of the Virginia House of Delegates from Hampshire County; 1789 – 1796; Served alongside: Isaac Miller; Elias Poston; Francis White; Alexander King	Succeeded by Fielding Calmes
