= Sinotectirostrum =

Sinotectirostrum Temporal range: Silurian–Carboniferous

Scientific classification
- Domain: Eukaryota
- Kingdom: Animalia
- Phylum: Brachiopoda
- Class: Rhynchonellata
- Order: Rhynchonellida
- Family: †Trigonirhynchiidae
- Subfamily: †Trigonirhynchiinae
- Genus: †Sinotectirostrum; Sartenaer, 1961

Extinct genus of brachiopods

Sinotectirostrum is a genus of brachiopods found in Paleozoic strata.

Cherkesova (2007) reassigns two taxa, "radiata" and "omaliusi", that Nalivkin had placed in Camarotoechia, to Sinotectirostrum as a new combination for a species and a subspecies respectively.
