= William Foreman =

Captain William Foreman (1726 – September 27, 1777) was a colonial American officer from Hampshire County, Virginia, who was killed during a Native American ambush at the McMechen Narrows on the Ohio River south of Wheeling, Virginia in 1777.

== Fort Forman ==
Before traveling to Wheeling to reinforce Fort Henry from Indian attacks, Foreman helped to establish Fort Forman in his home county near the South Branch Potomac River.

== The Grave Creek Massacre ==
As recounted by Willis De Haas in History of Early Settlement and Indian Wars of West Virginia, mysterious smoke was reported south of Wheeling in the McMechen area. Wheeling residents were concerned that Indians had attacked and burned the stockade and houses of Mr. Tomlinson. Colonel David Shepherd dispatched Captain Foreman and 45 men to investigate the source of the smoke to the south.

Captain Foreman discovered the settlements at McMechen to be intact with no evidence of Indian attacks. After staying the night at McMechen, the party returned north on the morning of Sunday, September 26. Frontier guides familiar with the area suggested to Captain Foreman that he and his party should leave the path at the river bottom and return to Wheeling by way of the ridge. A man named Lynn explained to the commander that Indians in the area had probably noted the party's movements and crossed the river during the night. They would most likely attack the group at the river. Foreman refused this advice and ordered his men to stay on the lower route. Lynn and a group of six or eight others ignored Foreman's orders and followed the ridge path.

When the party reached the extreme upper end of the McMechen Narrows, the men under Foreman's command broke ranks to investigate a display of Indian trinkets strewn across the path. As the entire party gathered around the trinkets, two lines of Indians from both sides of the path opened fire in a coordinated ambush. The men of Foreman's party who escaped the initial volley were pursued as they tried to escape up the hill to the ridge. The Indian force, numbering 20 to 25 men, suffered no known casualties.

Lynn and his party, upon hearing the guns, rushed down the hill toward the site of the ambush "hallooing as if they were five times as numerous" (De Haas). Their efforts caused the Indians to retreat, but not before killing Captain Foreman and 27 of his men, including two of Foreman's sons. The account of men killed in the ambush included: Captain William Foreman, Edward Peterson, Benjamin Powell, Hambleton Foreman, James Greene, John Wilson, Jacob Pew, Isaac Harris, Robert McGrew, Elisha Shriver, Henry Risera, Batholomew Viney, Anthony Miller, John Vincent, Solomon Jones, William Ingle, Nathan Foreman, and Abraham Powell. However, De Haas stated on page 233 of the cited source 'We give a list of losses sustained by members of Captain Foreman's company, but there is nothing to indicate who were killed.' Thwaites and Kellogg provide the following lists. Killed: Capt William Foreman, Hamilton Foreman, George Avery, Thomas Brazier, Hugh Clark, Jacob Greathouse, Ezekiel Hedges, Moses Lawson, Jacob Ogle, John Polk, William Shens and William Williams. Captured: Jonathan Pugh. Escaped: Harry Castleman, John Chambers, John Cullins, William Engle (Ingle), Robert Harkness, William Harrod, Solomon Jones, William Linn, Daniel McLain, Joseph Ogle, John Vincent and Martin Wetzel.

Several days after the ambush, a group from Wheeling reinforced by troops from Fort Pitt (Pennsylvania) and led by Colonel Shepherd buried the dead in one grave at the head of the narrows where they fell.

== Commemoration of Captain Foreman ==
In 1835, a stone was placed at the grave. The stone was removed in 1875 to Mount Rose Cemetery in Moundsville, West Virginia. As a result of the massacre that occurred at the narrows, area residents now refer to the stream as "Grave Creek."

There are 3 streams that empty into the Ohio River at Moundsville: Little, Middle and Big Grave Creek. The name derives from Indian burial sites located throughout the area and predate the Foreman Massacre.
