= Literary Hall =

Mid-19th-century library and museum in Romney, West Virginia, USA

- U.S. National Register of Historic Places
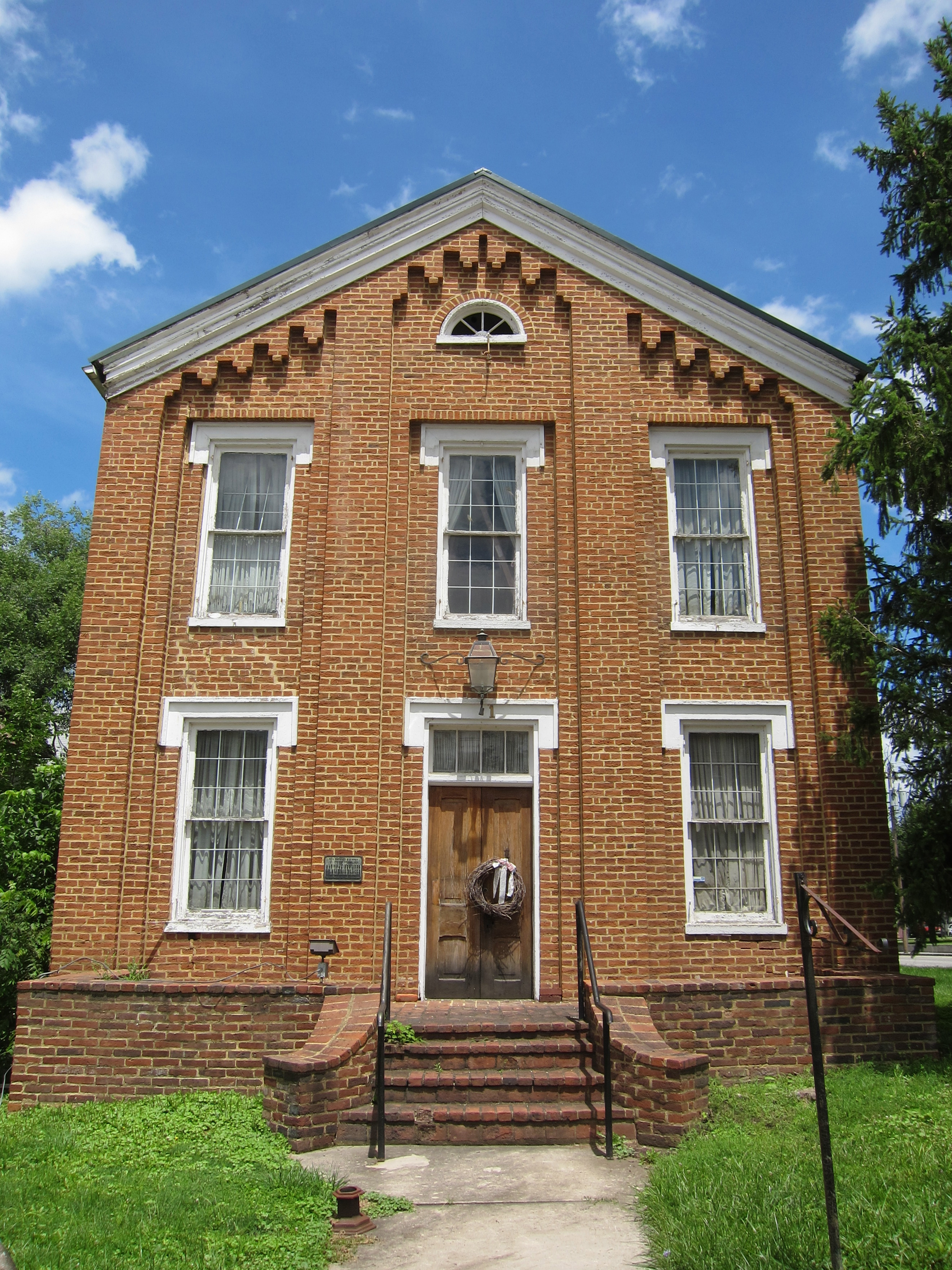
- Literary Hall, viewed from the south, facing West Main Street in Romney

- Location within Romney, West Virginia Location within Eastern Panhandle of West Virginia Location within West Virginia Location within the United States
- Location: West Main & North High Streets; Romney, West Virginia, United States
- Coordinates: 39°20′32″N 78°45′24″W
- Area: Less than 1 acre (0.40 ha)
- Built: 1869–70
- Architectural style: Federal, Greek Revival, Victorian
- NRHP reference No.: 79002577
- Designated: May 29, 1979

Literary Hall is a mid-19th-century brick library, building and museum located in Romney, a city in the U.S. state of West Virginia. It is located at the intersection of North High Street (West Virginia Route 28) and West Main Street (U.S. Route 50). Literary Hall was constructed between 1869 and 1870 by the Romney Literary Society.

Founded in 1819, the Romney Literary Society was the first literary organization of its kind in the present-day state of West Virginia, and one of the first in the United States. In 1846, the society constructed a building which housed the Romney Classical Institute and its library. The Romney Literary Society and the Romney Classical Institute both flourished and continued to grow in importance and influence until the onset of the American Civil War in 1861.

During the war, the contents of the society's library were plundered by Union Army forces, and many of its 3,000 volumes were either scattered or destroyed. After a reorganization in 1869, the society commenced construction of the present Literary Hall in downtown Romney. It transferred ownership of its Romney Classical Institute campus to the West Virginia Schools for the Deaf and Blind in 1870 and in that year completed Literary Hall, where the society reconstituted its library collection and revived its literary activities.

The Romney Literary Society's last meeting was held at Literary Hall in 1886. From that point to 1973 the building was used as a meeting space by the Clinton Lodge of Ancient Free and Accepted Masons and the Order of the Eastern Star. In 1973, the building was purchased by prominent Romney lawyer Ralph Haines, who used it as a law office and museum. From 1937 to the early 1940s the building also housed a community library. Literary Hall was listed on the National Register of Historic Places on May 29, 1979.

== Geography and setting ==
Literary Hall is located in the center of downtown Romney, West Virginia, at the intersection of North High Street (West Virginia Route 28) and West Main Street (U.S. Route 50) on a city lot less than one acre (0.40 ha) in size. The Hampshire County Courthouse is immediately to its east across North High Street, and the Romney First United Methodist Church is situated immediately to the building's north. The Old National Building is located to the immediate south of Literary Hall across West Main Street. Literary Hall stands at an elevation of 820.3 feet (250.0 m) above sea level.

== History ==
=== Location ===
The land upon which Literary Hall was established was originally part of the Northern Neck Proprietary, a land grant that the exiled Charles II awarded to seven of his supporters in 1649 during the English Interregnum. Following the Restoration in 1660, Charles II finally ascended to the English throne. Charles II renewed the Northern Neck Proprietary grant in 1662, revised it in 1669, and again renewed the original grant favoring original grantee Thomas Colepeper, 2nd Baron Colepeper and Henry Bennet, 1st Earl of Arlington in 1672. In 1681, Bennet sold his share to Lord Colepeper, and Lord Colepeper received a new charter for the entire land grant from James II in 1688. Following the deaths of Lord Colepeper, his wife Margaret, and his daughter Katherine, the Northern Neck Proprietary passed to Katherine's son Thomas Fairfax, 6th Lord Fairfax of Cameron in 1719.

Literary Hall was built upon a land lot designated "Lot 56" to the immediate west of the public square of Romney. In 1790, the trustees of the Town of Romney commissioned John Mitchel to draft a cadastral survey map of Romney. Prior to this survey, Lord Fairfax had commissioned a similar cadastral survey of Romney sometime before the town's incorporation on December 23, 1762. On June 30, 1790, Mitchel submitted to the trustees a "Plan of the Town of Romney", which divided the town into 100 land lots of equal size, with four lots adjacent to the courthouse comprising the public square.

=== Romney Literary Society ===
The Romney Literary Society, which built Literary Hall between 1869 and 1870, was organized by nine prominent men in Romney on January 30, 1819. With its establishment in 1819, the Romney Literary Society became the first literary organization of its kind in the present-day state of West Virginia, and one of the first in the United States. On February 4, 1819, the constitution of the society was adopted, which provided that the organization should be known as the "Polemic Society of Romney". The society founded its library in 1819 with the acquisition of two books, and by 1861 the society's humble library had grown to contain approximately 3,000 volumes, consisting of books on literature, science, history and art.

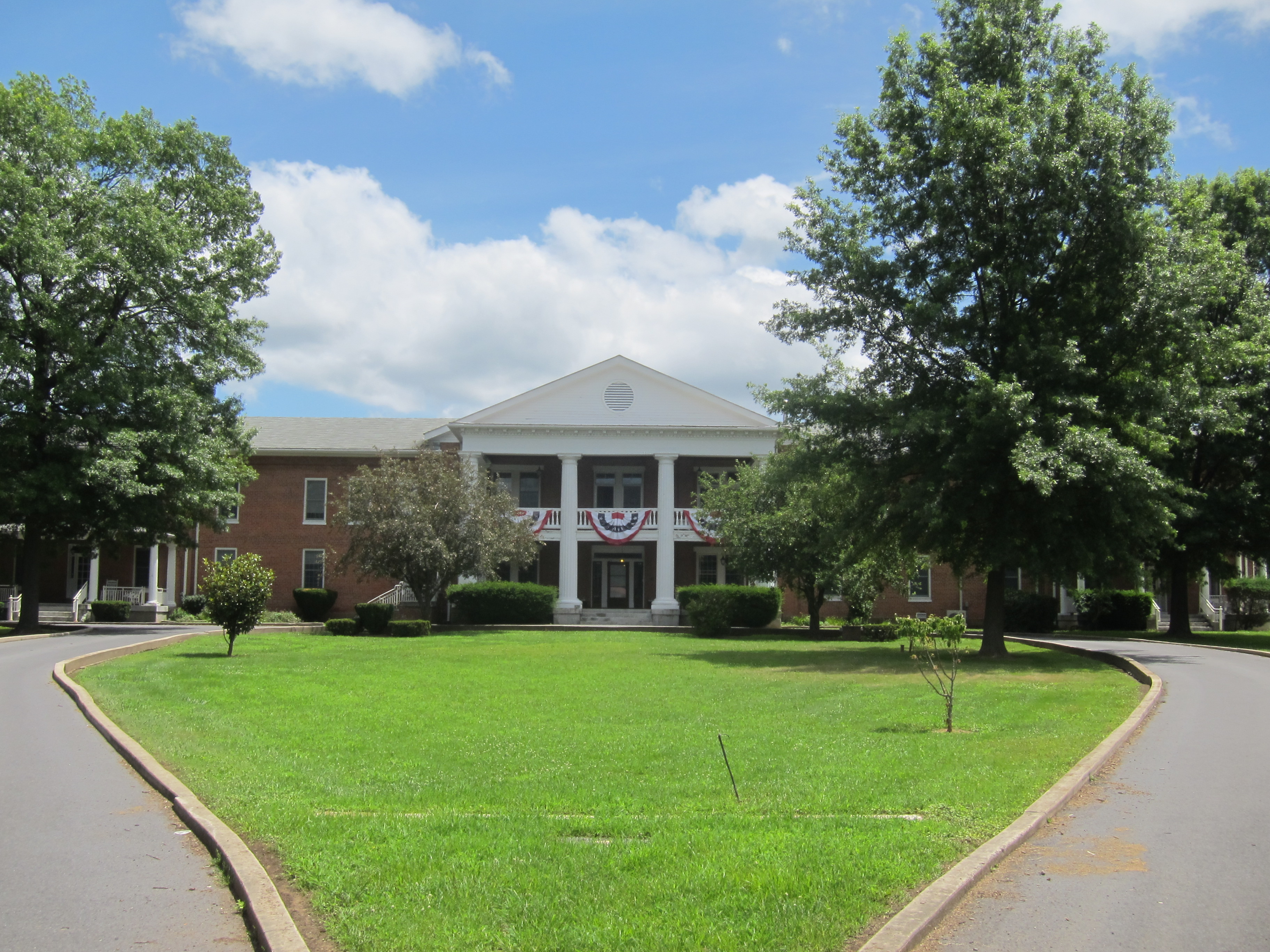
The administration building of the West Virginia Schools for the Deaf and Blind, the center section of which is the former Romney Classical Institute and Romney Literary Society library building

The Romney Literary Society commenced a movement to establish an institution for "the higher education of the youth of the community". As a result of this initiative, the teaching of the classics was introduced into the curriculum of Romney Academy in 1820, thus making the institution the first school of higher education in the Eastern Panhandle. In 1846, the society constructed a new building to house the Romney Classical Institute and its library, both of which fell under the society's supervision.

The Romney Literary Society and the Romney Classical Institute both flourished and continued to grow in importance and influence until the onset of the Civil War in 1861. During the war, many members fought for the Confederate States Army forces and were killed during the conflict. The contents of the society's library were plundered by Union Army forces, and many of its 3,000 volumes were either scattered or destroyed. Following the war's end, only 400 of those volumes could be recovered, with just 200 remaining on the library's shelves.

The Romney Literary Society reorganized on May 15, 1869. Following the reorganization, the society built Literary Hall between 1869 and 1870 while also undertaking an initiative to bring the West Virginia Schools for the Deaf and Blind to its old Romney Classical Institute campus. The construction of Literary Hall was part of the society's effort to revive the organization and reassemble its original library. The society set about recovering original volumes and purchasing new ones, and the library reopened with 700 volumes. For a period of ten years between 1870 and 1880, much of Romney's intellectual life centered on Literary Hall. As older members died, interest in the society began to dwindle. The society's meetings were held less frequently, and its last recorded meeting was held on February 15, 1886.

=== Clinton Lodge ===
The Clinton Lodge of Ancient Free and Accepted Masons was the second organization to utilize Literary Hall as a meeting place. The Clinton Lodge was the first Masonic lodge to be chartered in Hampshire County and is among the earliest Masonic lodges to be established in present-day West Virginia. It was chartered by the Grand Lodge of Virginia on December 13, 1825. The lodge underwent four periods of hiatus: first, between 1838 and December 15, 1846; a second time between 1855 and its rechartering on July 3, 1857; a third time between 1861 and December 11, 1867, during the Civil War and Reconstruction; and a fourth time between November 29, 1881, and November 12, 1890, when it was again reactivated.

Following the completion of Literary Hall in 1870, the Clinton Lodge Masons regularly utilized the first floor of the building as a meeting space, while the Romney Literary Society maintained its use of the second floor as a library. Between its various periods of dormancy, the Clinton Lodge and the associated Order of the Eastern Star, which was organized in July 1919, utilized Literary Hall as a meeting space, and following the Romney Literary Society's disestablishment, the Masons and Eastern Star continued their use of the building. In 1973, prominent Romney lawyer Ralph Haines purchased Literary Hall from the Clinton Lodge Masons to rescue the old building from demolition and provided the lodge with a land lot for the construction of a new Masonic Temple at the corner of Washington and Center Streets in Romney. Following his purchase of Literary Hall, Haines restored the building to its original state and used it as a law office building and private museum. Haines later relocated his law offices to an adjacent commercial building. Under Haines's ownership, Literary Hall was listed on the National Register of Historic Places on May 29, 1979.

=== Hampshire County Public Library ===
The building again served as a library in March 1937, when Romney's community library was relocated to the first floor of Literary Hall from its previous facility in the basement of the Hampshire County Courthouse. The library had been established on April 11, 1935, as a project by the American Legion Auxiliary, and was housed in a room of the courthouse basement where it was staffed by volunteers and open from 2pm to 4pm on Saturday afternoons. When the library's collection of both purchased and donated books outgrew its space in the courthouse basement, the Clinton Lodge Masons granted permission to the library to house its collection at Literary Hall in 1937. Following its move to Literary Hall, the library expanded its hours, and expanded them again, to five afternoons a week, through the assistance of the National Youth Administration and the Works Progress Administration.

In January 1942, a meeting was held for the purpose of establishing a more extensive library service. Later that month, on January 29, a charter was issued by West Virginia Secretary of State William Smith O'Brien for the creation of the non-profit Hampshire County Library Association. Following its incorporation, the library was relocated from Literary Hall to two rear adjoining rooms on the second story of the Hampshire County Courthouse. The association continued to house its library collection in the courthouse until 1967, when the new Hampshire County Public Library building at 153 West Main Street was formally dedicated on September 28, 1967. The library had been built on land donated by sisters Kate and Mary Davis, who had been engaged in the restoration of Literary Hall and whose father, Charles Maurice Davis, had been a member of both the Romney Literary Society and the Clinton Lodge Masons, which had both held meetings in the building.

== Architecture ==
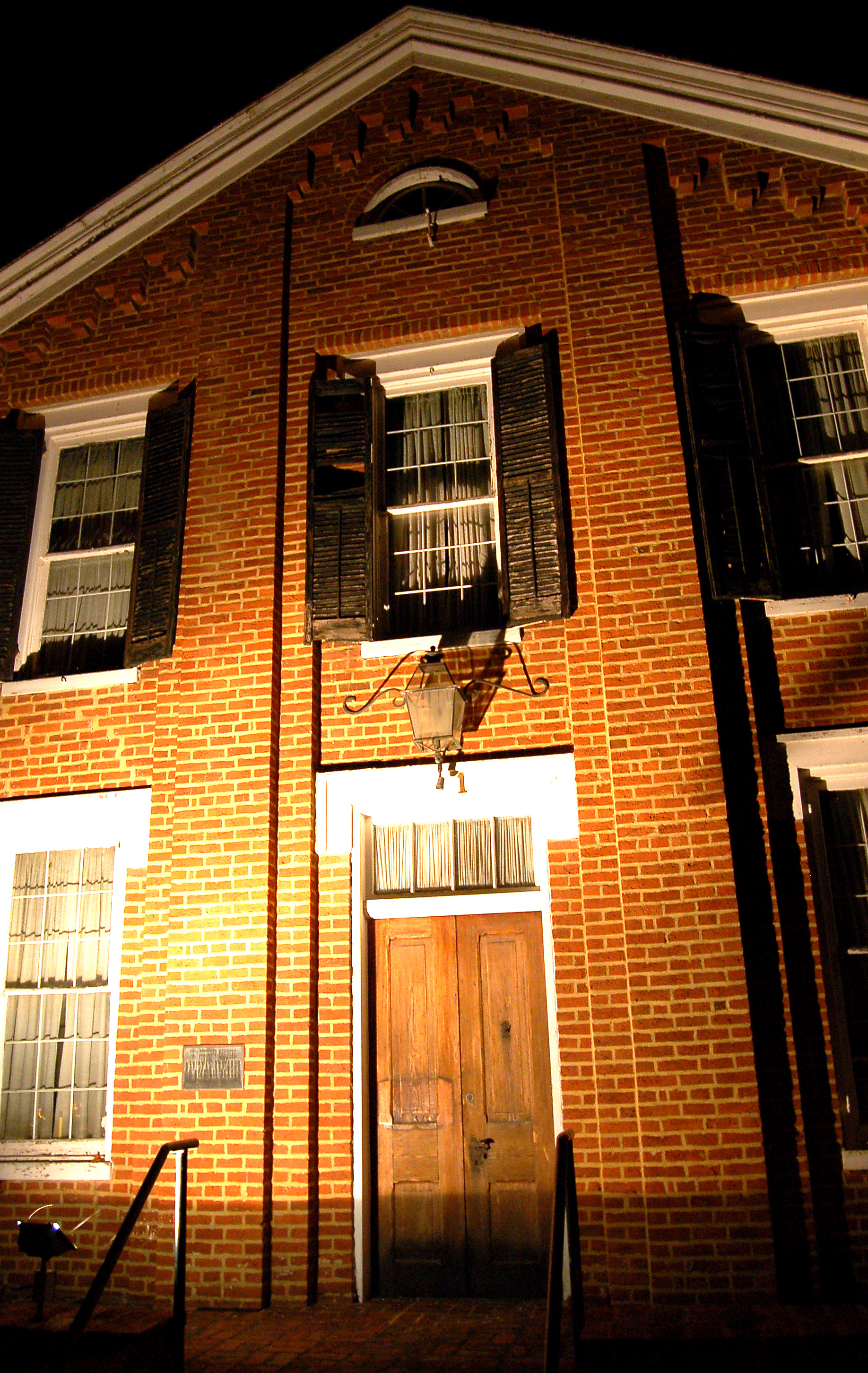
Literary Hall's main façade, photographed at night

The interior and exterior of Literary Hall remain largely intact. At two stories, the building is tall in its proportion and incorporates elements from both early American and Victorian styles, which were common in academic buildings built during this period.

Architectural historian S. Allen Chambers described Literary Hall as an anomaly because the basic design and fenestration patterns, which invoke early Federal and Greek Revival design elements, are adorned with details more characteristic of the Victorian era.

According to architectural historian Michael J. Pauley of the West Virginia Department of Culture and History's Historic Preservation Unit, Literary Hall's unique structural features make the building "one of Romney's and Hampshire County's most notable landmarks, and one in which this community is justifiably proud". Pauley further averred that the building is "highly representative of the development of education and literature in the early United States". In describing its impact on Romney's streetscape, Chambers described Literary Hall as "adding distinction to Romney's major street intersection". Chambers also noted the building's resemblance and "strong architectural kinship" to the Romney Presbyterian Church.

Literary Hall is a two-story red brick structure, rectangular in plan, and topped with a gable roof. The first floor of Literary Hall consists of four rooms, and the second story is a single large ballroom. Fused with symmetrical elements evoking Federal and Greek Revival architectural styles are exterior decorative moldings and brick corbeling in the Victorian style.

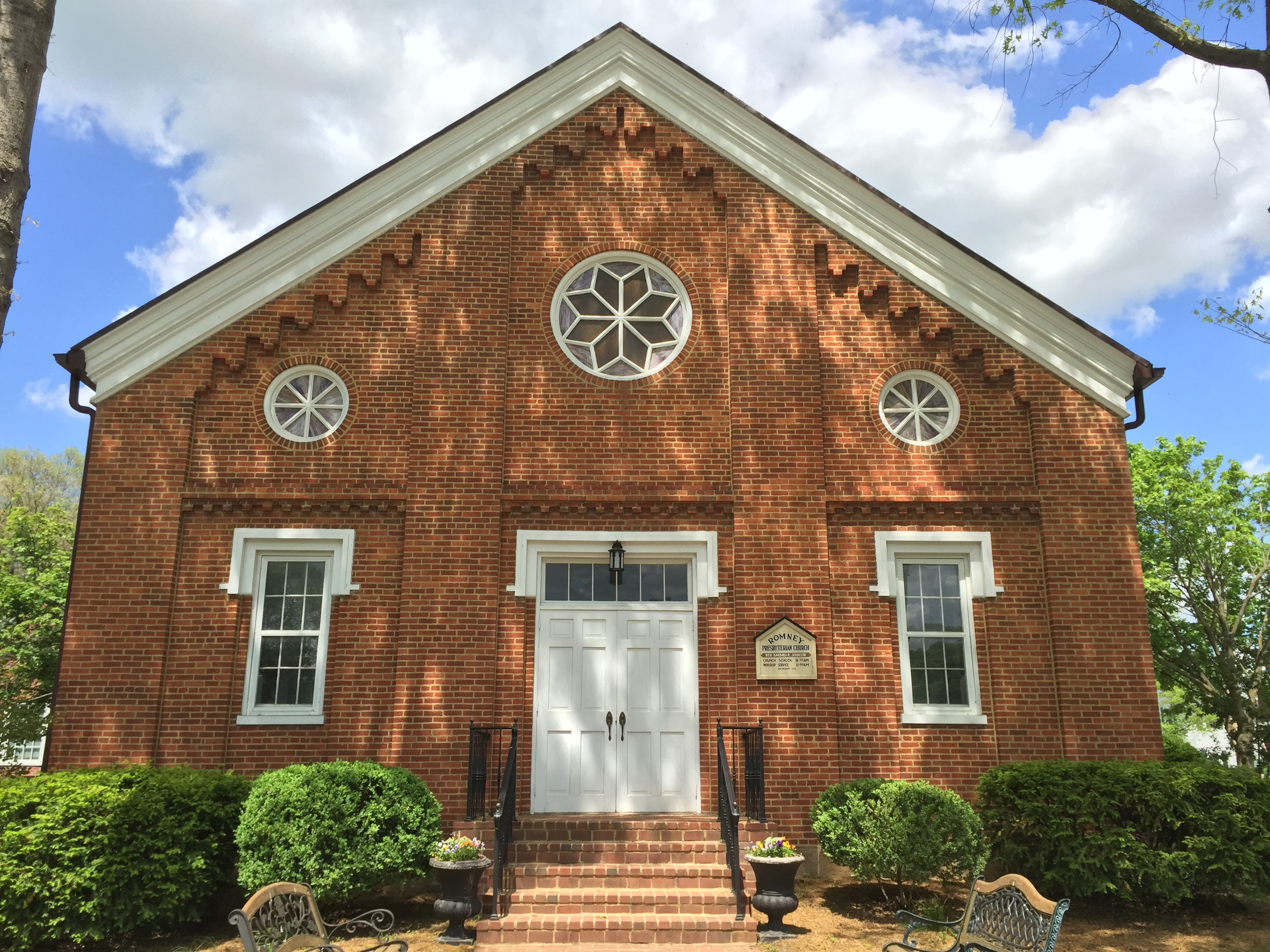
Architectural historian S. Allen Chambers compared Literary Hall's architectural design with that of the Romney Presbyterian Church.

The main façade (south elevation) of Literary Hall is divided into three bays, and its west and east elevations are divided into five bays. Each of the building's bays consists of a double-hung sash wooden window, with nine panes of glass within each sash. The windows are symmetrically placed within recessed brick panels that are defined at the first and second stories of the building with elementary brick ribs, or pseudo-pilasters, that form the outer surface of the building's exterior walls and provide separation of the three bays of the main façade and the five bays of the west and east elevations. The windows are framed by white wooden louvered window shutters. The building's brick is laid in an American bond pattern, with five courses of stretchers between every course of headers.

The main façade is topped by a simple wooden raking cornice that surmounts an ornamental corbel brick pendant. A semicircular fanlight, or lunette, is located in the center of the gable of the building's main façade, providing lighting to the building's attic. Chambers described this window as the most antiquated of the building's architectural elements and may have been based on the fanlight of the county's earlier courthouse built in 1833, which was located to the building's east.

Each of the main façade's first- and second-story windows and the entrance are adorned with white wooden label moldings. The main entrance is composed of a tall double wooden entrance door, with its original handle and locks. Each door consists of four vertical wooden panels. A rectangular transom light of four vertical glass panels tops the main entryway's double wooden doors. Outside the entryway is a spacious brick stoop that is accessed by a cement walkway from West Main Street. Its brick steps leading up to the stoop were last restored in the late 1970s.

Literary Hall is flanked by two interior side chimneys, between the second and third bays of the west and east elevations of the building. The building rests on a sandstone, ashlar block foundation. Its gable roof is sheathed with standing seam tin sheeting.

== Bibliography ==
- Brannon, Selden W., ed. (1976). Historic Hampshire: A Symposium of Hampshire County and Its People, Past and Present. Parsons, West Virginia: McClain Printing Company. ISBN 978-0-87012-236-1. OCLC 3121468.
- Chambers, S. Allen (2004). Buildings of West Virginia. Oxford, New York City: Oxford University Press. ISBN 978-0-19-516548-7. OCLC 53315276.
- Coleman, Roy V. (1951). Liberty and Property. New York City: Scribner. OCLC 1020487. Archived from the original on October 22, 2020.
- Federal Writers' Project (1937). Historic Romney 1762–1937. Romney, West Virginia: Federal Writers' Project, The Town Council of Romney, West Virginia. OCLC 2006735.
- Maxwell, Hu; Swisher, Howard Llewellyn (1897). History of Hampshire County, West Virginia, from Its Earliest Settlement to the Present. Morgantown, West Virginia: A. Brown Boughner, Printer. OCLC 680931891. OL 23304577M.
- Munske, Roberta R.; Kerns, Wilmer L., eds. (2004). Hampshire County, West Virginia, 1754–2004. Romney, West Virginia: The Hampshire County 250th Anniversary Committee. ISBN 978-0-9715738-2-6. OCLC 55983178.
- Pauley, Michael J. (January 12, 1979). National Register of Historic Places Registration Form: Literary Hall (PDF). United States Department of the Interior, National Park Service. Archived from the original (PDF) on October 9, 2015.
- Rice, Otis K. (2015). The Allegheny Frontier: West Virginia Beginnings, 1730-1830. Lexington, Kentucky: University Press of Kentucky. ISBN 978-0-8131-6438-0. OCLC 900345296. Archived from the original on May 27, 2016.
- Rose, Cornelia Bruère (1976). Arlington County, Virginia: A History. Arlington County, Virginia: Arlington Historical Society. OCLC 2401541. Archived from the original on April 2, 2016 – via Google Books.
- William and Mary Quarterly (April 1898). "The Northern Neck of Virginia". William and Mary Quarterly. 6 (4): 222–226. doi:10.2307/1915885. ISSN 0043-5597. JSTOR 1915885. OCLC 1607858.
