= Romney Literary Society =

19th-century literary society

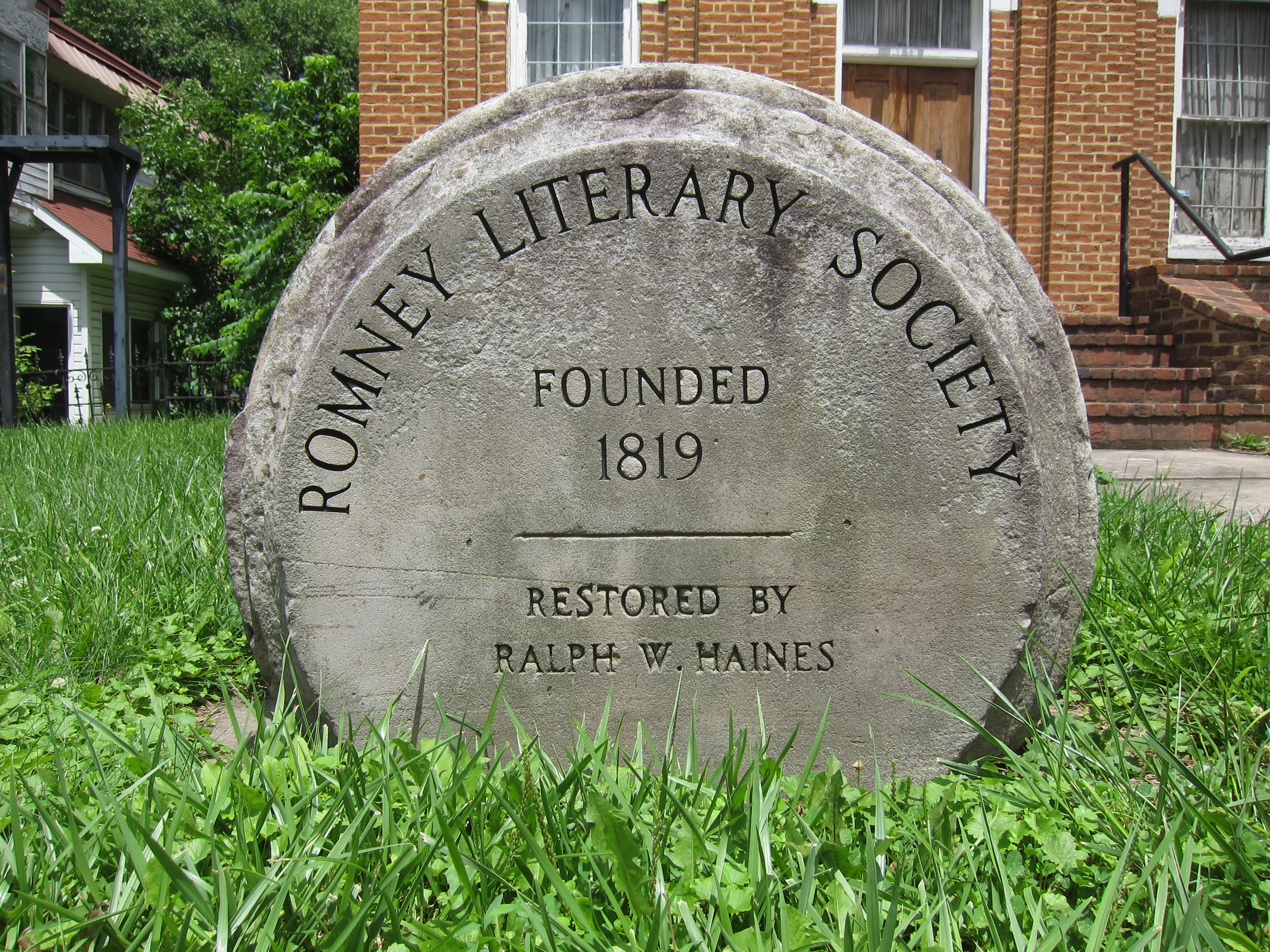
- Stone commemorative marker at Literary Hall in Romney, West Virginia
- Formation: January 30, 1819
- Founders: Thomas Blair; David Gibson; James P. Jack; Samuel Kercheval, Jr.; Nathaniel Kuykendall; Charles T. Magill; James M. Stephens; John Temple; William C. Wodrow
- Dissolved: February 15, 1886
- Legal status: Defunct
- Purpose: The society's purpose was to advance literature and science, purchase and maintain a library, and improve educational opportunities.
- Headquarters: Romney Classical Institute (1846–69); Literary Hall (1869–86)
- Location: Romney, West Virginia, United States
- Affiliations: Romney Academy; Romney Classical Institute; Potomac Seminary; West Virginia Schools for the Deaf and Blind
- Formerly called: Polemic Society of Romney

Locations of the Romney Literary Society

The Romney Literary Society (also known as the Literary Society of Romney) existed from January 30, 1819, to February 15, 1886, in Romney, West Virginia. Established as the Polemic Society of Romney, it became the first organization of its kind in the present-day state of West Virginia, and one of the first in the United States. The society was founded by nine prominent men of Romney with the objectives of advancing literature and science, purchasing and maintaining a library, and improving educational opportunities.

The society debated an extensive range of scientific and social topics, often violating its own rules which banned religious and political subjects. Even though its membership was relatively small, its debates and activities were frequently discussed throughout the Potomac Highlands region, and the organization greatly influenced trends of thought in the Romney community and surrounding areas.

The society's library began in 1819 with the acquisition of two books; by 1861, it had grown to contain approximately 3,000 volumes on subjects such as literature, science, history, and art. The organization also sought to establish an institution for "the higher education of the youth of the community." In 1820, as a result of this initiative, the teaching of the classics was introduced into the curriculum of Romney Academy, thus making the institution the first school of higher education in the Eastern Panhandle. In 1846, the society constructed a building which housed the Romney Classical Institute and its library, both of which fell under the society's supervision. The institute was administered by noted Presbyterian Reverend William Henry Foote. Following a dispute with the society, Foote founded a rival school in Romney, known as the Potomac Seminary, in 1850.

The Romney Literary Society and the Romney Classical Institute continued to grow in influence until the onset of the American Civil War in 1861. The contents of the society's library were plundered by Union Army forces, and only 400 of the library's volumes could be recovered following the war's end in 1865. Reorganized in 1869, the society took a leading role in Romney's civil development during Reconstruction. Between 1869 and 1870, it completed construction of Literary Hall, where the society held meetings and reassembled its library. The organization used its influence to secure the West Virginia Schools for the Deaf and Blind for the town of Romney, and offered the school its former Romney Classical Institute campus. The schools opened on September 29, 1870. Interest in the society waned during its final years, and its last recorded meeting was held in 1886.

== Establishment ==
The Romney Literary Society was organized on January 30, 1819, by nine prominent men of Romney in the office of Dr. John Temple, a reputable physician in the community. The society was formed with the purpose "of taking into consideration the propriety of financing a Society, having for its object the advancement of Literature and Science, the purchase of a Library by and for the use of its members; and their further improvement by discussing before the Society such questions as shall be selected under its directors." With its establishment, the Romney Literary Society became the first organization of its kind in the present-day state of West Virginia, and one of the first in the United States. The nine men at the society's first meeting were Thomas Blair, David Gibson, James P. Jack, Samuel Kercheval, Jr., Nathaniel Kuykendall, Charles T. Magill, James M. Stephens, John Temple, and William C. Wodrow. According to historian Hu Maxwell, these men elected Kuykendall as chairman and Magill as secretary of a committee which was charged with the drafting of a constitution for the society.

On February 4, 1819, the committee delivered its draft of the constitution and the society adopted the document, which provided that the organization should be known as the Polemic Society of Romney. The society's constitution also specified that the officers should consist of a president, secretary, and treasurer, each of whom was to be selected by a ballot vote. The constitution further stipulated that each member was to pay dues of 50 cents per month, and that the society had the authority to levy further financial contributions from its members as it deemed necessary. The funds collected were to cover the society's operating costs, and the remaining funds were to be used in purchasing books for the library. Under the constitution, the society's meetings were to be held weekly. Following each meeting's business session, a debate or other literary exercises were to be held consisting of topics of general interest of the members. No political or religious discussions were to take place during the debates unless they were of an abstract nature or in general terms. Profane language and "spirituous liquors" were also forbidden from the society's meetings, with each offense being punishable with a fine of one dollar. The society's first elected officers were Charles T. Magill as president, William C. Wodrow as secretary, and John Temple as treasurer.

== Early debates ==
The society's next meeting was held on February 13, 1819, in the old Hampshire County Courthouse, where the first matter for debate was "Resolved: That a representative should be governed by instructions from his constituents." Following the debate, the decision was rendered in favor of the affirmative. The second meeting, which was held on February 19 of that year at the Romney Academy, debated the question, "Is an education acquired at the public school or [is] a private tutor to be preferred?" and the society favored the public school. At this second meeting, the first money appropriated by the society was paid to the doorkeeper for a sum of 25 cents. Also at this second meeting, the treasurer was instructed to purchase a book for use by the secretary, three candlesticks, one pair of snuffers, and three pounds of candles. On February 26, the society argued the question, "Is a system of banking advantageous to a community?" The debate ended under the decision that a system of banking was advantageous. The following meeting on March 6 debated a question far more psychological in nature, which was an abstract question of religion: "Can the human mind, by its own reflection, arrive at the conclusion that the soul is immortal?" The society decided in the negative. The society also debated and decided in the negative the question, "Is a protective tariff detrimental to the interests of the country?"

One of the society's more spirited debates occurred in May 1822 over the question, "Is it to the interest of the people of Hampshire to encourage the canalling of the Potomac?" While no records of the arguments survive, the society decided that the canalling of the Potomac River would be detrimental to the interests of Hampshire County. The debate took place before the construction of the Chesapeake and Ohio Canal along the Maryland shore of the Potomac River to the north of Hampshire County. The society's consensus was that a canal on the Potomac would destroy the business of teamsters who hauled merchandise from the east along the Northwestern Turnpike. For this reason, the society and local population of Romney also objected to the construction of the Baltimore and Ohio Railroad. To ensure confidentiality, the society passed a bylaw that enforced a fine of five dollars on any member who published either his own or another member's speeches delivered before the society. As a result of this bylaw, no speeches were ever published. The society adopted a new constitution in 1824.

== Growth and influence ==
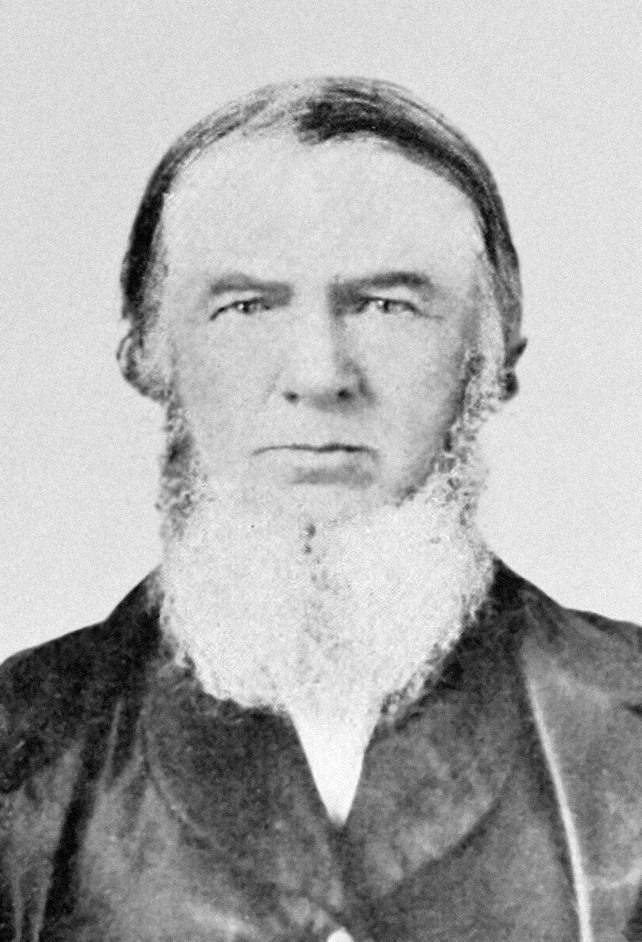
John Baker White

Over the first ten years of the society's existence, the organization grew in membership and held meetings at least twice a month, and usually four times a month. The society debated an extensive range of subjects including scientific, religious, political, and social topics, often violating the constitution's rules banning religious and political subjects. The society's debates were often acrimonious and regularly spilled beyond the confines of the meetings and into the community. Between January 30, 1819, and January 22, 1830, the society's membership rolls reached 52 members; although as few as 15 members attended the bimonthly meetings, and no more than 17 members were ever present at a meeting.

Even though the Romney Literary Society's membership was relatively small, its debates and activities were frequently discussed throughout the Potomac Highlands region. For this reason, the society greatly influenced trends of thought in the Romney community and surrounding areas. No records of the society's proceedings, works, or membership enrollments spanning the period between January 22, 1830, and 1861 are extant. During this period, the society counted among its members Angus William McDonald, John Baker White, and Robert White.

== Library collection ==
In order to fulfill one of its primary purposes of establishing a library for its members, the Romney Literary Society gradually began to acquire volumes for such a use. The society's library began with the April 23, 1819, appropriation for the purchase of two books: Plutarch's Parallel Lives and Emer de Vattel's The Law of Nations. (Note: Maxwell and Swisher assert the society's first two volumes were Plutarch's Parallel Lives and Emer de Vattel's The Law of Nations. However, the Federal Writers' Project and historian Selden W. Brannon state that the first two books purchased by the society were Plutarch's Parallel Lives and Charles Rollin's Ancient History.) On July 2, 1819, the balance of available funds in the treasurer's account was two dollars and forty-six cents, but by October 23, there were sufficient funds to purchase the following volumes: Charles Rollin's Ancient History, Lewis' Roman History, and William Robertson's History of the Reign of Charles the Fifth.

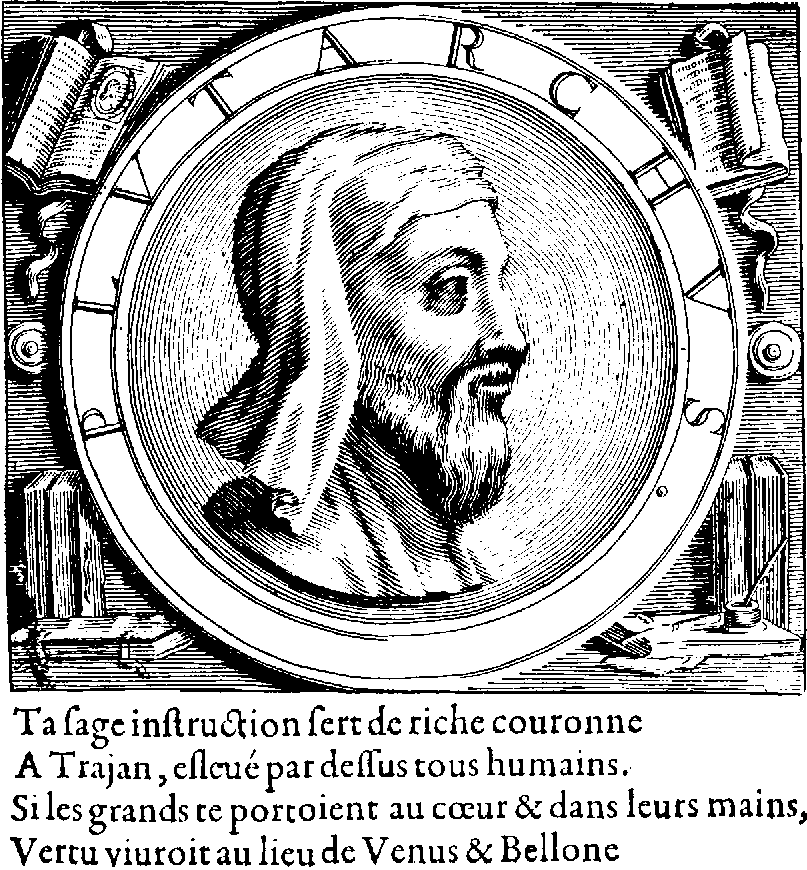
Parallel Lives by Plutarch (pictured) was among the first two volumes acquired by the society

No more volumes were purchased until the end of 1820, when the society acquired the works of Livy, Tacitus, and John Marshall's Life of Washington. Three months later, the society purchased a bookcase for its growing collection. In April 1821, the society further expanded its library with the acquisitions of Nathaniel Hooke's Roman History, from the Building of Rome to the Ruin of the Commonwealth, the works of Herodotus, Travels in Greece, Modern Europe, David Ramsay's History of the United States, and the works of Benjamin Franklin.

In 1821, the Virginia General Assembly passed an act incorporating the organization as the "Library Society of Romney." The society found the assembly's charter unsatisfactory, as it specified several changes to the organization that the society had not asked for, including the change in its name. The members regarded their society as a "literary" society and not a "library" one. The society requested that the assembly amend its charter, and after several delays and debates over the new charter, the Virginia General Assembly passed a new act on February 4, 1823, in which the organization was rebranded as "The Literary Society of Romney." The society maintained this long form name throughout the duration of its existence, although it was locally known as the "Romney Literary Society."

Within the span of ten years, the society's small library grew to contain approximately 3,000 volumes on literature, science, history, and art. These were bound in calfskin and stamped with the seal of the society. The minutes from the society's bimonthly meetings listed the books purchased and the methods by which they were acquired. According to the Federal Writers' Project in their Historic Romney 1762–1937 (1937), the book selections and their acquisition "indicate that these men possessed real literary judgment and business ability."

By resolutions of the society, the use of the library was for the society's members, and was further extended to "ministers of the gospel of all denominations gratis." Certain citizens of Romney were also granted access to the library, and enjoyed similar privileges as its members.

== Academic patronage ==
From the organization's foundation, the Romney Literary Society gradually began to recognize that the local subscription school systems provided only elementary and often fragmentary education and no longer satisfied the academic needs of the Romney community. The society periodically engaged in lengthy deliberations on which theories of educational advancement and popular education were preferable. Shortly after its establishment, the society commenced a movement to establish an institution for "the higher education of the youth of the community." In 1820, as a result of this initiative, the teaching of the classics was introduced into the curriculum of Romney Academy, thus making the institution the first school of higher education in the Eastern Panhandle. Under the guidance, leadership, and strict discipline of Dr. Henry Johnston, Romney Academy became widely renowned for its courses in "higher classics." His successor and society member William Henry Foote introduced courses in theology, and the school's enrollment grew to include students preparing for ministry. As the school became more renowned in the South Branch Potomac River valley, pupils came from further and further away. Thomas Mulledy and Samuel Mulledy were among the early instructors at the academy, both of whom later served as presidents of Georgetown University in Washington, D.C.

By 1831, Romney Academy had outgrown its facilities in the old stone school building behind the Hampshire County Courthouse. To remedy this, the society instituted a campaign to raise funds for a new school building. On January 6, 1832, the Virginia General Assembly authorized the society to raise an endowment of $20,000 in a lottery for educational purposes. Following a ten-year lapse, the society made arrangements with James Gregory of Jersey City and Daniel McIntyre of Philadelphia to finance a lottery "for raising a sum of money not exceeding twenty thousand dollars, for the purpose of erecting a suitable building for their accommodation, the purchase of library and Philosophical apparatus." The lottery was to be conducted over a period of ten years, and sums of $750, $1,000, and $1,500 were to be raised in semiannual installments. The society was successful in raising funds, and in 1845 the society solicited bids for the construction of a new building to house both the academy, the society, and the society's library. The society also used the lottery funds to pay for books for the academy.

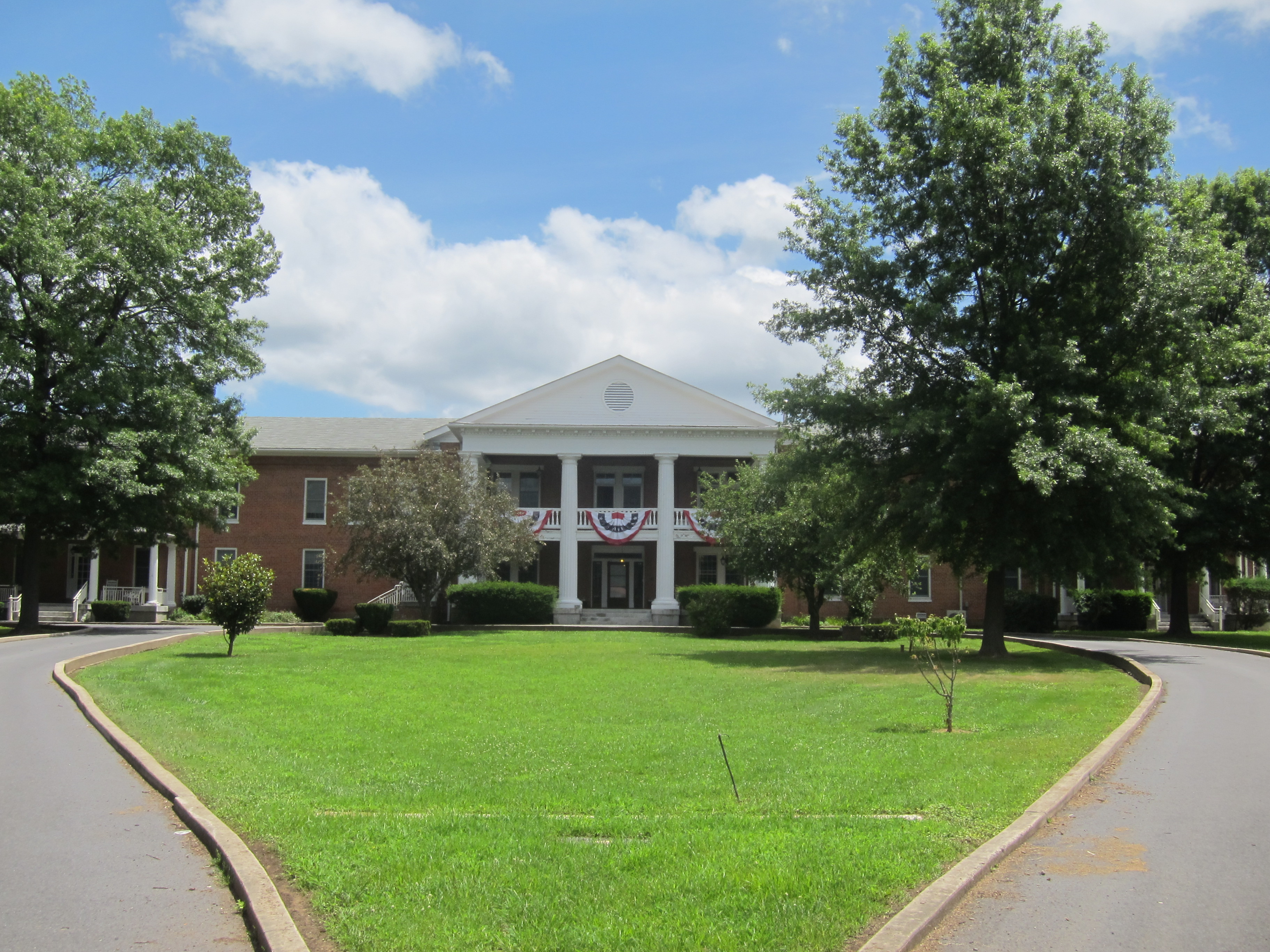
The administration building of the West Virginia Schools for the Deaf and Blind, the center section of which is the former Romney Classical Institute and library building

On February 12, 1844, the Virginia General Assembly passed an act authorizing the society to denote the balance of the moneys raised by the lottery to the Romney Academy. The assembly further enacted another legislative act on December 12, 1846, authorizing the Romney Literary Society to "establish at or near the town of Romney a Seminary of Learning for the instruction of youth in various branches of science and literature; and the Society map appropriate to the same such portion of the property which it now has or may acquire, as it may deem expedient." That same year, a new brick neoclassical building was constructed east of Romney, and the society, its library, and Romney Academy relocated to the new facility. The second story of the new building was utilized by the society, with one hall for meetings and the other hall for the society's library. According to Maxwell, "few schools in the state of Virginia at that time had access to better libraries." The new institute building and grounds cost the society about $8,000. Following its move to the new building, the academy was reorganized as the Romney Classical Institute and its activities fell under the supervision of the society. The institute was operated under the principalship of Foote from 1846 until 1849.

In 1849, the society presented a new code and system of bylaws for the government of the Romney Classical Institute, which reserved to the society the power to appoint assistant teachers, fix the amount of salaries, and provide the conditions and manners of payment and reimbursement. Foote differed with the society over these matters, and he ultimately declined to accept the new bylaws and resigned his leadership position in October 1849; in 1850, he established a rival institution known as the Potomac Seminary. Rather than falling under the patronage of the society, Foote's new institution fell under the control of the Presbyterian church. Following Foote's departure, the society selected Professor E. J. Meany to head the Romney Classical Institute. Despite the schism, the society also provided financial support from the lottery to the Potomac Seminary.

According to a "catalogue of the members and library" published on June 1, 1849, there were 20 registered members on the rolls who paid $3 each per year to the society's library fund; there were also eight library members who were admitted under certain regulations of the society and who paid the same fees. Members who had use of the library were provided keys and were allowed access to the library at any time. The town's clergymen and the principal of the Romney Classical Institute were the only non-members who were extended privileges to the library. The 1849 "catalogue" listed Alfred P. White as the society's librarian and E. J. Meany remained the principal of the institute. After 1853, the society possessed a permanent fund of $12,000, which yielded $720 per year, one half of which was devoted to the support of the Romney Classical Institute.

== American Civil War and hiatus ==
The Romney Literary Society and the Romney Classical Institute flourished and continued to grow in importance and influence until the onset of the American Civil War in 1861. Following the war's outbreak, many of the society's members and the institute's professors and older students joined the Confederate States Army and marched to war. During the war, the society suffered extensive losses. The Romney Classical Institute building and its library were considered legitimate plunder by Union Army forces. The society's library was emptied and three-fourths of its volumes were either scattered or destroyed. The most valuable of these volumes were never recovered following the war's end. Its records of proceedings between 1830 and 1861, the period during which the society engaged in most of its notable literary and philanthropic works, were also destroyed during the war.

Following the war's end, only 400 out of the library's nearly 3,000 volumes could be recovered, with only 200 of those books remaining on the library's shelves. Between 10 and 20 of the library's recovered volumes only contained three to four of their original books. The value of the recovered volumes was degraded, as many were damaged or broken. The society members that returned home to Romney were too war-weary to revive the society when they discovered the ruins of the Romney Classical Institute and its library, which had been an expensive endeavor to accumulate and took almost a half-century of labor to amass. The Romney Classical Institute was not restored and was in effect disestablished on account of the war.

== Revival ==
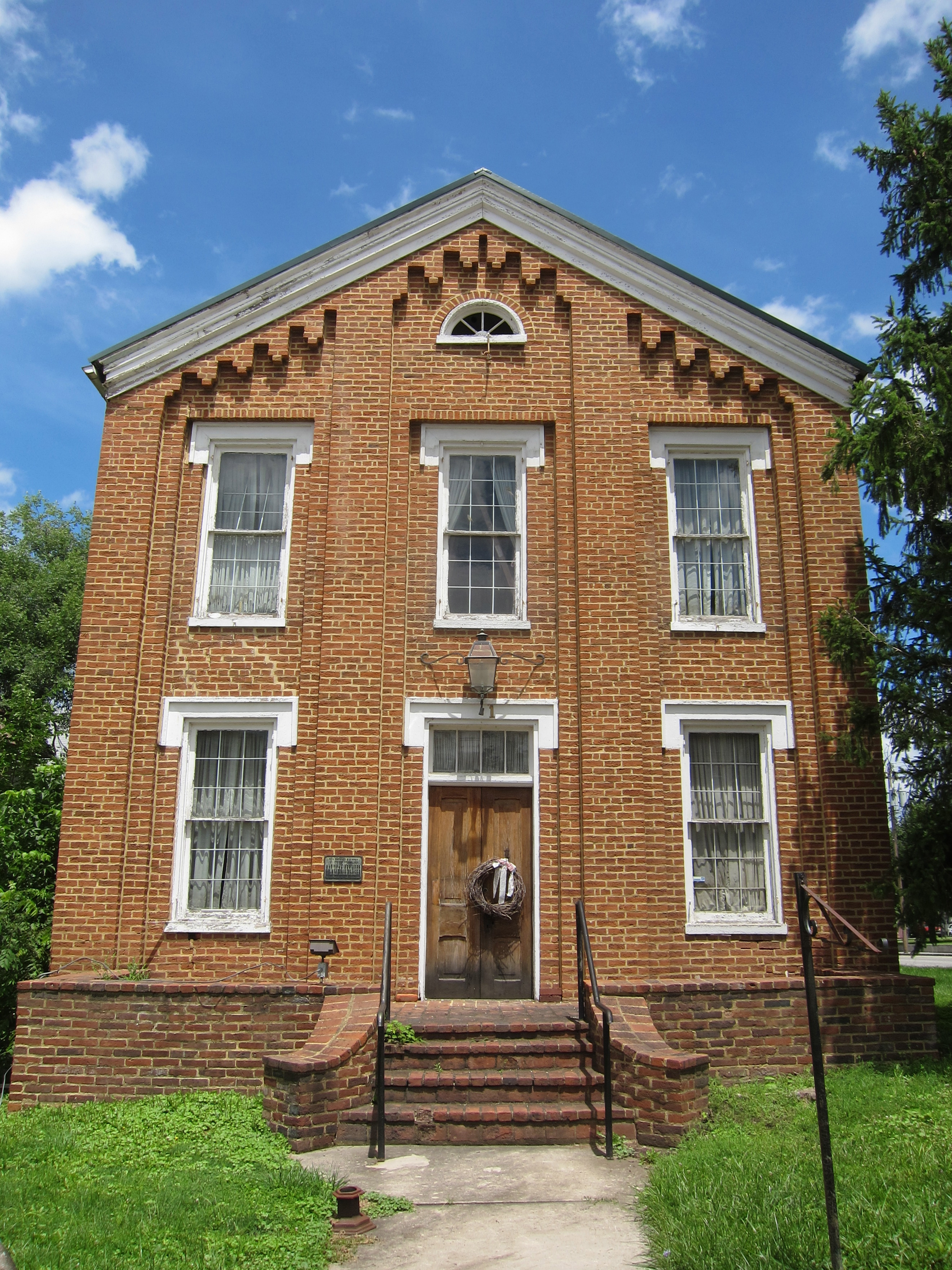
Literary Hall

Following the war, the residents of Romney set about repairing public buildings and reestablishing the town's antebellum institutions, including the Romney Literary Society. The society remained on a hiatus until May 15, 1869, when a meeting was held by nine members, as only nine original members had responded to the call for reorganization. These nine members tasked with rebuilding the society were James Dillon Armstrong, David Entler, William Harper, John C. Heiskell, Andrew Wodrow Kercheval, Samuel R. Lupton, James Parsons, Alfred P. White, and Robert White. These men sought to collect what remained of the library's books and engaged in a campaign to recruit new members, which resulted in the enrollment of 20 younger men over a period of a few years. Many of the men who had been members in 1861 had died during the war, and the recruitment of new members was essential to the revival of the society. Among the new members elected between 1869 and 1886 were John Collins Covell, Samuel Lightfoot Flournoy, Henry Bell Gilkeson, Howard Hille Johnson, and Christian Streit White. The society, with renewed vigor, took a lead role in Romney's civil development during the Reconstruction Era.

Between 1869 and 1870, the society completed construction of a new two-story brick building on Lot 56 at the corner of West Main and North High Streets known as Literary Hall, where it could hold its meetings and reassemble the remaining volumes from its original library. Literary Hall was built upon the former location of the shuttered Bank of the South Branch of the Potomac. In addition to the 400 volumes that were initially recovered following the war, the society recovered several more volumes from its original library, and set about purchasing new books; the restored library was reopened with about 700 volumes.

== West Virginia Schools for the Deaf and Blind ==
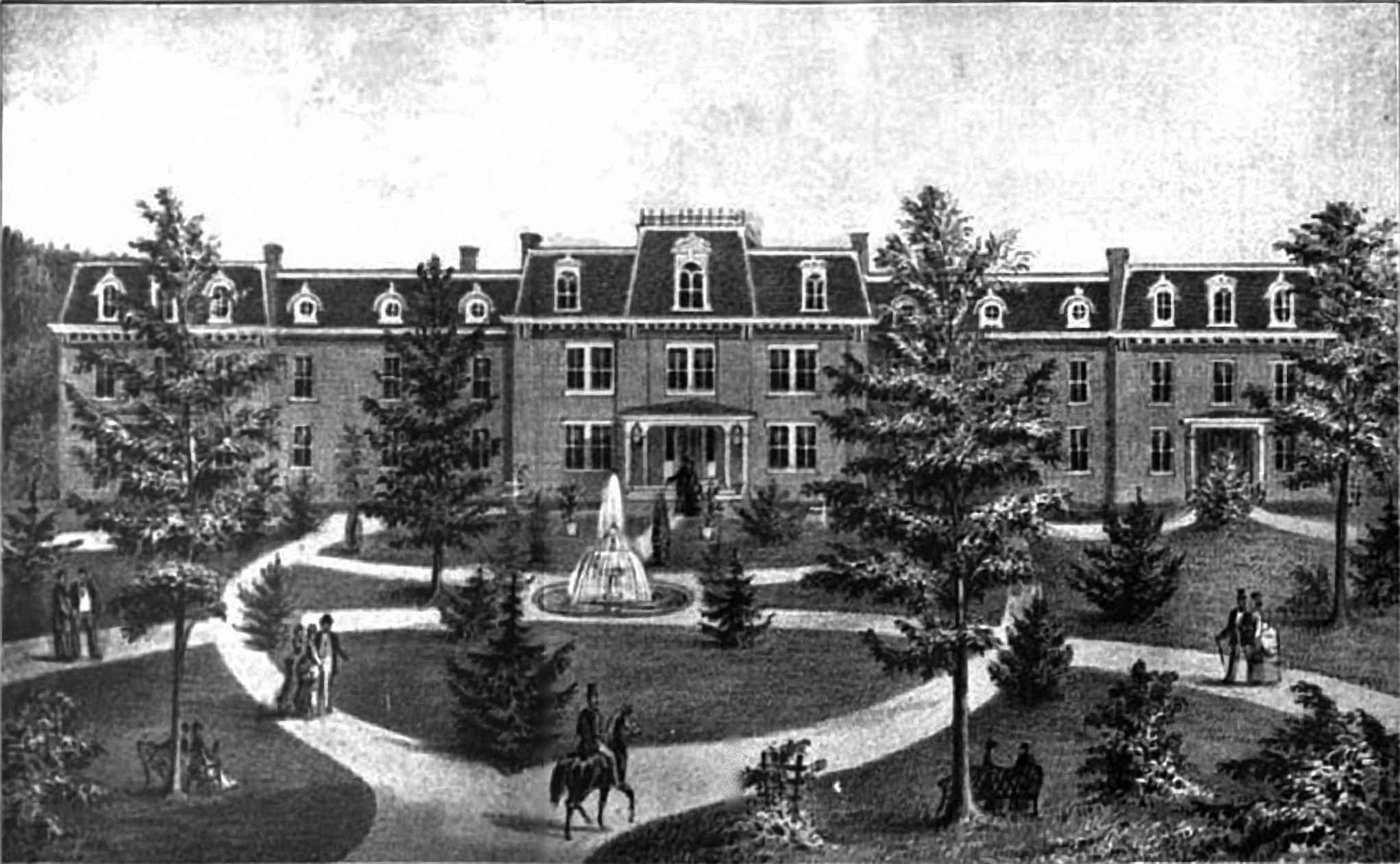
The old Romney Classical Institute building, remodeled for the West Virginia Schools for the Deaf and Blind

Around the time of the society's reorganization in 1869, the state of West Virginia considered the establishment of a school for the deaf and the blind. The society resolved to secure the new state institution for Romney. On April 12, 1870, the society passed a resolution by which the members agreed to deed, free of cost, the buildings and grounds of the Romney Classical Institute.

On April 20, 1870, the society sent Andrew Wodrow Kercheval and Robert White as representatives to the then-state capital Wheeling to present their formal offer of "the grounds and buildings of the Romney Classical Institute... to the Board of Regents, free of debt, and in good repair" on the condition that the proposed school be located in Romney. Clarksburg and Parkersburg also made offers of potential campuses to the state. The offer was made to the Board of Regents of the West Virginia Institute for the Deaf, Dumb, and Blind, as it was then known, and the society's proposal was accepted by the regents after a brief period of deliberation. The society's offer was the only one that included a building upon the grounds.

It was discovered by the society that in order to follow through with their proposition, it was necessary to raise more than $1,000, which was ostensibly a difficult task during the Reconstruction Era in Romney. On July 11, 1870, the Board of Regents passed a resolution necessitating the subscription of between $1,200 and $1,300 to facilitate the transaction. One hundred and eighteen individuals and firms responded to the board's request with a total subscription of $1,383.60. To make good on its offer, the society also made an appropriation of $320 on July 11 for the purpose of repairing and restoring the former Romney Classical Institute and grounds so that they were satisfactory before they were transferred to the regents. Shortly thereafter, the old institute building and 15 acres (6.1 ha) of property were formally transferred to the state of West Virginia.

On September 29, 1870, the institute, which was later known as the West Virginia Schools for the Deaf and Blind, opened its doors in the old Romney Classical Institute building with 25 deaf and five blind students. Following its disestablishment in 1916, the adjacent Potomac Academy (formerly Potomac Seminary) grounds were also incorporated into the campus of the Schools for the Deaf and Blind.

== Final years ==
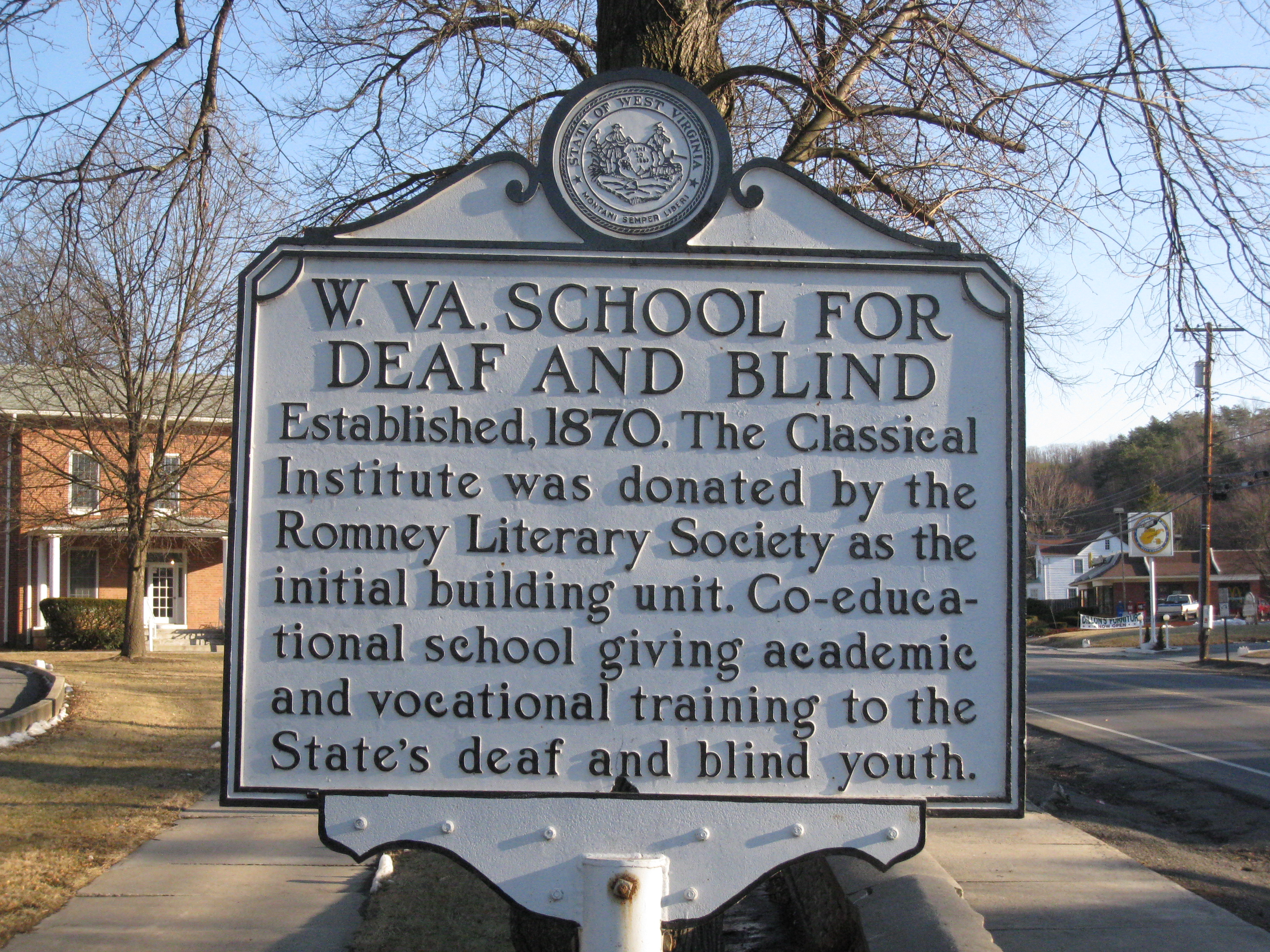
The West Virginia historical marker for the West Virginia Schools for the Deaf and Blind in Romney

During a period of ten years spanning from 1870 to 1880, much of Romney's intellectual life centered on Literary Hall. During this time, the society met only occasionally and there were no records of meetings between March 1872 and April 1878. The post-war period of revival was short-lived, as the death of the older members caused interest in the society to wane. The society's meetings occurred less often, and the last recorded meeting of the society was held on February 15, 1886. During the society's second existence, Literary Hall was used as a meeting space by the Freemasons and the Order of the Eastern Star, and the organizations continued to inhabit the hall following the society's disestablishment until its 1974 purchase by attorney Ralph Haines. Also a local historian, Haines restored Literary Hall and used it as his law office and museum. Literary Hall was listed on the National Register of Historic Places on May 29, 1979, and, as of 2004, it is occasionally open to the public. The society's remaining records, dating as early as 1819, remain on display there.

== Legacy ==
In describing the efforts of the Romney Literary Society, historian Hu Maxwell, in his History of Hampshire County, West Virginia From Its Earliest Settlement to the Present (1897), stated that "the work accomplished by these few energetic citizens of Romney is astonishing." Maxwell further asserted, "No other one thing in the history of the town has had such lasting results for good." The society left many lasting impacts upon the town of Romney during its existence and beyond, which included the foundation of a library; the academic and financial support and patronage of the Romney Academy, Romney Classical Institute, and the Potomac Seminary; the civic leadership during the Reconstruction Era; and the influence and assistance in securing the West Virginia Schools for the Deaf and Blind. According to Maxwell, without the efforts of the society, the West Virginia Schools for the Deaf and Blind could not have been secured for Romney, and would have likely been located elsewhere in the state.

== See also ==
- Literary Hall
- Romney Academy
- West Virginia Schools for the Deaf and Blind

== Bibliography ==
- Brannon, Selden W., ed. (1976). Historic Hampshire: A Symposium of Hampshire County and Its People, Past and Present. Parsons, West Virginia: McClain Printing Company. ISBN 978-0-87012-236-1. OCLC 3121468.
- Federal Writers' Project (1937). Historic Romney 1762–1937. Romney, West Virginia: Federal Writers' Project; Town Council of Romney, West Virginia. OCLC 2006735.
- Jewett, Charles C. (1851). Notices of Public Libraries in the United States of America. Washington, D.C.: Smithsonian Institution. OCLC 11908184 – via Internet Archive.
- Maxwell, Hu; Swisher, Howard Llewellyn (1897). History of Hampshire County, West Virginia From Its Earliest Settlement to the Present. Morgantown, West Virginia: A. Brown Boughner, Printer. OCLC 680931891. OL 23304577M.
- Munske, Roberta R.; Kerns, Wilmer L., eds. (2004). Hampshire County, West Virginia, 1754–2004. Romney, West Virginia: The Hampshire County 250th Anniversary Committee. ISBN 978-0-9715738-2-6. OCLC 55983178.
- Pauley, Michael J. (January 12, 1979). National Register of Historic Places Registration Form: Literary Hall (PDF). United States Department of the Interior, National Park Service. Archived from the original (PDF) on October 14, 2011.
- Rice, Otis K. (2015). The Allegheny Frontier: West Virginia Beginnings, 1730–1830. Lexington, Kentucky: University Press of Kentucky. ISBN 978-0-8131-6438-0. OCLC 55631. Archived from the original on May 27, 2016 – via Google Books.
