= Romney Classical Institute =

Location
- East Main Street (Northwestern Turnpike); Romney, Hampshire County, Virginia (now West Virginia); United States; 39.340575°N 78.752048°W

Information
- Established: December 12, 1846
- Closed: Shuttered during the American Civil War (1861–65); Closed after 1866
- Oversight: Romney Literary Society (1846–1861); Joseph Nelson (1861–1865)
- Principals: William Henry Foote (1846–49); E. J. Meany (1850–51); John Jeremiah Jacob (1851–53); William C. Clayton (1853, 1866); Joseph Nelson (1853–65)
- Assistant Principals: John Jeremiah Jacob (1849–51)
- Faculty: Mr. Dinwiddie; John Jeremiah Jacob; Joseph Nelson
- Campus: present-day West Virginia Schools for the Deaf and the Blind
- Campus size: 15 acres (0.061 km^{2})

Romney Classical Institute was a 19th-century coeducational collegiate preparatory school in Romney, Virginia (present-day West Virginia), United States, between 1846 and shortly after 1866. Romney had previously been served by Romney Academy, but by 1831 the school had outgrown its facilities. The Virginia General Assembly permitted the Romney Literary Society to raise funds for a new school through a lottery. On December 12, 1846, the assembly established the school and empowered the society with its operation.

From 1846 to 1849, the institute was directed by Presbyterian Reverend William Henry Foote, who had been a teacher and principal at Romney Academy. In 1849, when the Romney Literary Society revamped the operating code and bylaws for the institute, Foote took offense; he established a rival school, Potomac Seminary, the next year. Professor E. J. Meany succeeded Foote, and was followed by eventual West Virginia governor John Jeremiah Jacob in 1851. Presbyterian Reverend Joseph Nelson replaced Jacob in 1853 and purchased the institute in 1861.

The Romney Literary Society and the Romney Classical Institute went on hiatus during the American Civil War. Nelson revived the school and was succeeded in 1866 by William C. Clayton, who later served in the West Virginia Senate; the institute was disestablished shortly thereafter. In 1870, the reorganized Romney Literary Society transferred the institute's building and grounds to the state of West Virginia for the approved West Virginia Schools for the Deaf and the Blind. The schools opened on September 29, 1870, and are still in operation today. However, the former institute building was destroyed by fire on February 26, 2022. In addition to Jacob and Clayton, Robert White, Attorney General of West Virginia, was an alumnus of the institute.

== Background ==
Prior to the establishment of the Romney Classical Institute in 1846, Romney and its environs had been served by a school as early as 1752 and by Romney Academy, which was incorporated by the Virginia General Assembly on January 11, 1814. By 1831, Romney Academy had outgrown its facilities in an old stone building just north of the Hampshire County Courthouse. Around this time, several academies in present-day West Virginia were aspiring to provide a college-level education, as there were few post-secondary institutions in the region prior to the American Civil War. To remedy this issue and improve educational opportunities for local children, the Romney Literary Society began an initiative to raise funds to construct a new school building. On January 6, 1832, the Virginia General Assembly authorized the society to raise $20,000 through a lottery. The society made arrangements with James Gregory of Jersey City and Daniel McIntyre of Philadelphia to finance the lottery, "for raising a sum of money not exceeding twenty thousand dollars, for the purpose of erecting a suitable building for their accommodation, the purchase of library and Philosophical apparatus." The lottery was conducted over a ten-year period, and sums of $750, $1,000, and $1,500 were to be raised in semiannual installments.

== Construction and establishment ==
The Romney Literary Society raised the necessary funds by 1845. On April 4, 1845, the society solicited for contractor bids, which were submitted by May 24. On that date, the land was deeded for the new school. Construction began that year, and the building and its grounds cost approximately $8,000 to complete.

According to an 1845 bid advertisement, the institute was planned as a brick building, 36 by 40 feet (11 by 12 m) and 22 feet (6.7 m) in height from the foundation. Plans also called for a tin roof to "be surmounted by a cupola." The bid advertisement also stated that the end of the building was to be the main façade, which was to be embellished with a "handsome portico the whole width of the house." The committee for the school building's construction, which consisted of E. M. Armstrong, John B. Kercheval, and David Gibson signed this advertisement.

On December 12, 1846, the Virginia General Assembly further empowered the Romney Literary Society: "To establish at or near the town of Romney a Seminary of Learning for the instruction of youth in various branches of science and literature; and the Society may appropriate to the same such portion of the property which it now has or may acquire, as it may deem expedient." Following the passage of this act, the Romney Classical Institute was formally established. That same year, the new two-story brick educational building was completed and the society's library and classes were relocated there. The completed building measured 54 by 40 feet (16 by 12 m), with an additional wing that served as principal's residence. The society used the second story of the building, which was divided into two rooms: a hall for society meetings and a hall for its library. Only society members, Romney clergy, and the institute's principal were given library privileges; each were provided with keys to visit the library at any time.

== Growth ==
From its foundation, the Romney Classical Institute was a coeducational collegiate preparatory school. The institute operated first under the principalship of Presbyterian minister the Reverend William Henry Foote, who had been a teacher and principal at Romney Academy. He served as the school's principal until 1849. Theology was one of the courses taught at the institute under Foote's leadership. In 1849, the Romney Literary Society established a new operating code for the institute, and a new system of bylaws for the governance of the school, which empowered the society to appoint teachers, fix salaries, and provide conditions of payment. Foote took this new code as a criticism of his leadership, and he resigned. In 1850, Foote founded a rival institution known as the Potomac Seminary. Foote raised the necessary funds and a brick building for the seminary was constructed approximately 902 feet (275 m) north of the institute building.

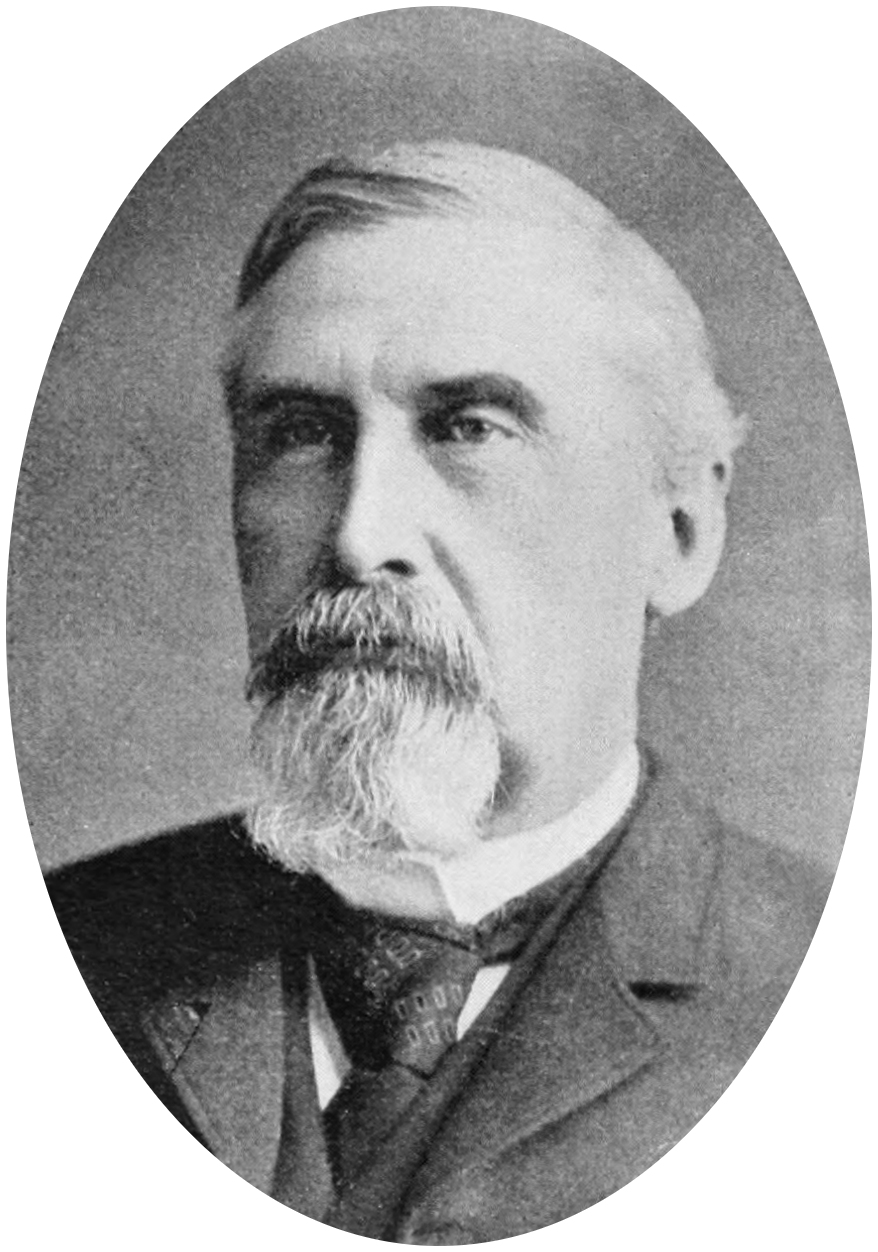
John Jeremiah Jacob served as the institute's principal from 1851 until 1853. He later served as the first Democratic Governor of West Virginia.

The society selected Professor E. J. Meany to head the institute following Foote's departure. Meany's assistant principals were John Jeremiah Jacob, Mrs. Meany, and Miss Kern. Jacob had attended both the institute and its predecessor, Romney Academy, and later served as West Virginia's first Democratic governor. Meany remained principal of the institute until at least 1851. Following his graduation from Dickinson College in 1849, Jacob became the institute's assistant principal under Meany. He became the school's principal in 1851 and served in that position until 1853, during which time he taught classes and practiced law. Jacob was still serving as the school's principal in May 1853 when he placed an advertisement for the school's summer session in May 1853 in Romney's South Branch Intelligencer newspaper.

While the school operated under the leadership of the Romney Literary Society, the institute established its own literary organization known as the Phrena Kosmian Society. On November 15, 1850, the Phrena Kosmian Society debated the question, "Would the Southern States be justified in seceding from the Confederacy under present circumstances?" There are no existing records of the debate's conclusion. Romney attorney Andrew Wodrow Kercheval delivered an address to the society on April 3, 1851, which was later printed at the office of the Virginia Argus and Hampshire Advertiser that year.

In 1850, the Virginia House of Delegates amended the act of December 12, 1846, establishing the school, and empowered the governor of Virginia to appoint the institute's Board of Visitors. The following year on March 1, 1851, the Virginia House of Delegates rejected John Kern, Jr. and other Board of Visitors members' petition to amend the institute's charter.

In 1853, the Romney Literary Society received an endowment of $20,000, and possessed a permanent fund of $12,000, which yielded $720 per year. Half of this yield was used to support the institute, including the purchase of textbooks. These figures remained the same in 1859. According to its May 1853 advertisement in the Virginia Argus and Hampshire Advertiser, the institute provided instruction to the following grades during its summer session: fifth grade for $5, fourth grade for $8, third grade for $10, second grade for $12, and first grade (its highest grade) for $15. Boarding, including laundry, meals, and lighting, was $45, and music lessons with use of the piano were $25. An additional fee of 25 cents was charged if a student was suspended. The institute's Primary Department taught the fifth grade, and lessons included spelling, reading and elementary arithmetic. The fourth grade was taught by the institute's Junior Department and included courses in writing and preparatory English grammar and geography. The English Department instructed the third grade and offered studies in geography and English; and the second grade was also taught by the English Department with courses in history and natural philosophy. First grade, the school's highest, was instructed by the Classical and Mathematical Department and offered studies in Greek, Latin, French, geometry, algebra, trigonometry, surveying, mensuration, navigation, astronomy, and bookkeeping.

According to an advertisement for a female teacher in the Baltimore Sun on November 9, 1853, William C. Clayton was serving as the institute's principal by late 1853. Clayton stated in the advertisement that the institute was seeking an experienced female teacher to lead the school's Female Department. The candidate for the female teacher was to be qualified to teach French, English, and music. Later in 1853, Reverend Joseph Nelson became principal, and he continued to serve in this capacity, and preach in the school's chapel, until the outbreak of the American Civil War in 1861. By spring 1857, the institute had a Male Department led by C. S. Hurt and a Female Department led by Mrs. M. R. Schenk, with Andrew Wodrow Kercheval serving as secretary pro tempore of its Board of Visitors.

In December 1859, John Kern, Jr., was the secretary of the school's Board of Visitors, and the institute advertised the position of principal, and received applications until January 5, 1860. In the school's December 1859 advertisements in the Richmond Dispatch, the institute sought "a gentleman well qualified to teach the classics thoroughly, whose lady could teach French and music, would be preferred." At this point, the institute had 50 students. Nelson's replacement was expected to take charge by February 1860. Though Nelson had purportedly accepted a position in Mississippi, there are no records to indicate that he left his post prior to the American Civil War.

By February 1861, Nelson had purchased the institute and its buildings from the Romney Literary Society, thus becoming its sole manager and proprietor as president. At this time, courses were offered during sessions lasting five months and the following fees were charged per grades: $16 for the Highest Grade, $12 for the Intermediate Grade, $8 for the Lowest Grade, $5 for Ancient Languages, and $5 for Modern Languages.

== Hiatus and final years ==
The institute and the society both continued to grow in importance until the outbreak of the American Civil War in 1861. After the war began, the institute's professors and older students joined the Confederate States Army and other Confederate partisan groups, and the institute and the society experienced a hiatus.

The Romney Literary Society's library suffered significant losses during the war, and by the war's end in 1865, only about 400 volumes of its once large 3,000-volume library could be located. Many of the society's members never returned from the war, and those who did were too weary and discouraged at first to revive the society or the Romney Classical Institute.

Following the war in August 1865, Nelson attempted to resurrect the institute and submitted an advertisement to the Civilian & Telegraph newspaper in Cumberland, Maryland, in which he billed the institute as "A Male and Female Boarding and Day School." The institute opened on the first Monday in September 1865 for its fall and winter session. According to Nelson's advertisement, "parents desiring for their children a sound English, Classical and Mathematical Education would do well to patronize this School." Student education was divided into three levels: the Lowest Grade level for $10 for a five-month session, Intermediate level for $15, and the Highest level for $20. Latin and Greek each cost an additional $5 per quarter. Boarding at the school cost $3 per week; however, laundry, fuel, and lighting were not included in this fee. Music lessons were also taught "at Professor's charges."

In 1866, William C. Clayton became the institute's principal and presided over the school for a few more terms. Like his predecessor John Jeremiah Jacob, Clayton had been a student at both the Romney Academy and the institute. Clayton served in the West Virginia Senate following his tenure as principal. A Mr. Dinwiddie was also a teacher at the school after the war. Nelson relocated to Cumberland, where he was principal of Cumberland City Academy for five years. It is not known if he sold the institute.

== Disestablishment and legacy ==
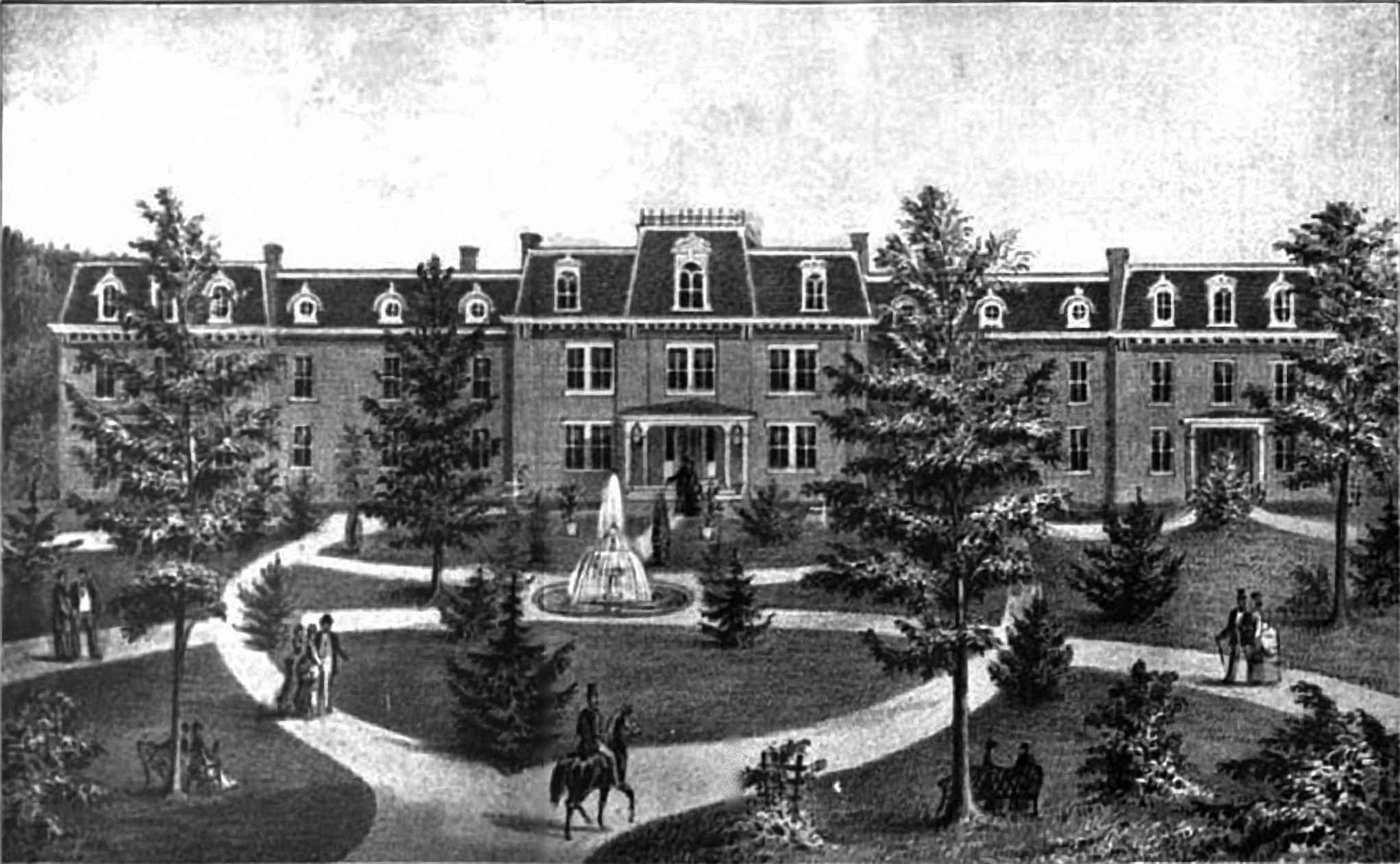
The institute's main building was later expanded and used as the administration building for the West Virginia Schools for the Deaf and the Blind from 1870 until the present day.

Despite the institute's effective disestablishment after 1866, a meeting was held on May 15, 1869, with nine original members of the Romney Literary Society: James Dillon Armstrong, David Entler, William Harper, John C. Heiskell, Andrew Wodrow Kercheval, Samuel R. Lupton, James Parsons, Alfred P. White, and Robert White. They set about expanding the society's membership rolls and reviving its library. Over the next few years, 20 younger members were added.

By 1869, the state of West Virginia considered the establishment of a school for deaf and blind students. The newly reorganized Romney Literary Society sought to secure this school for Romney as part of its Reconstruction development efforts. On March 3, 1870, the West Virginia Legislature passed an act providing for the establishment of the West Virginia Schools for the Deaf and the Blind. The society passed a resolution on April 12, 1870, by which it agreed to deed, free of cost, the institute's building and grounds to the state for the planned schools. On April 20, 1870, the society sent its members Robert White and Andrew Wodrow Kercheval to the then-state capital of Wheeling to offer "the grounds and buildings of the Romney Classical Institute... to the Board of Regents, free of debt, and in good repair" on the condition that the proposed institution be located at Romney. At the time of the society's offer, the institute's grounds consisted of 15 acres (61,000 m^{2}). Offers for campus locations were also made by citizens of Clarksburg and Parkersburg.

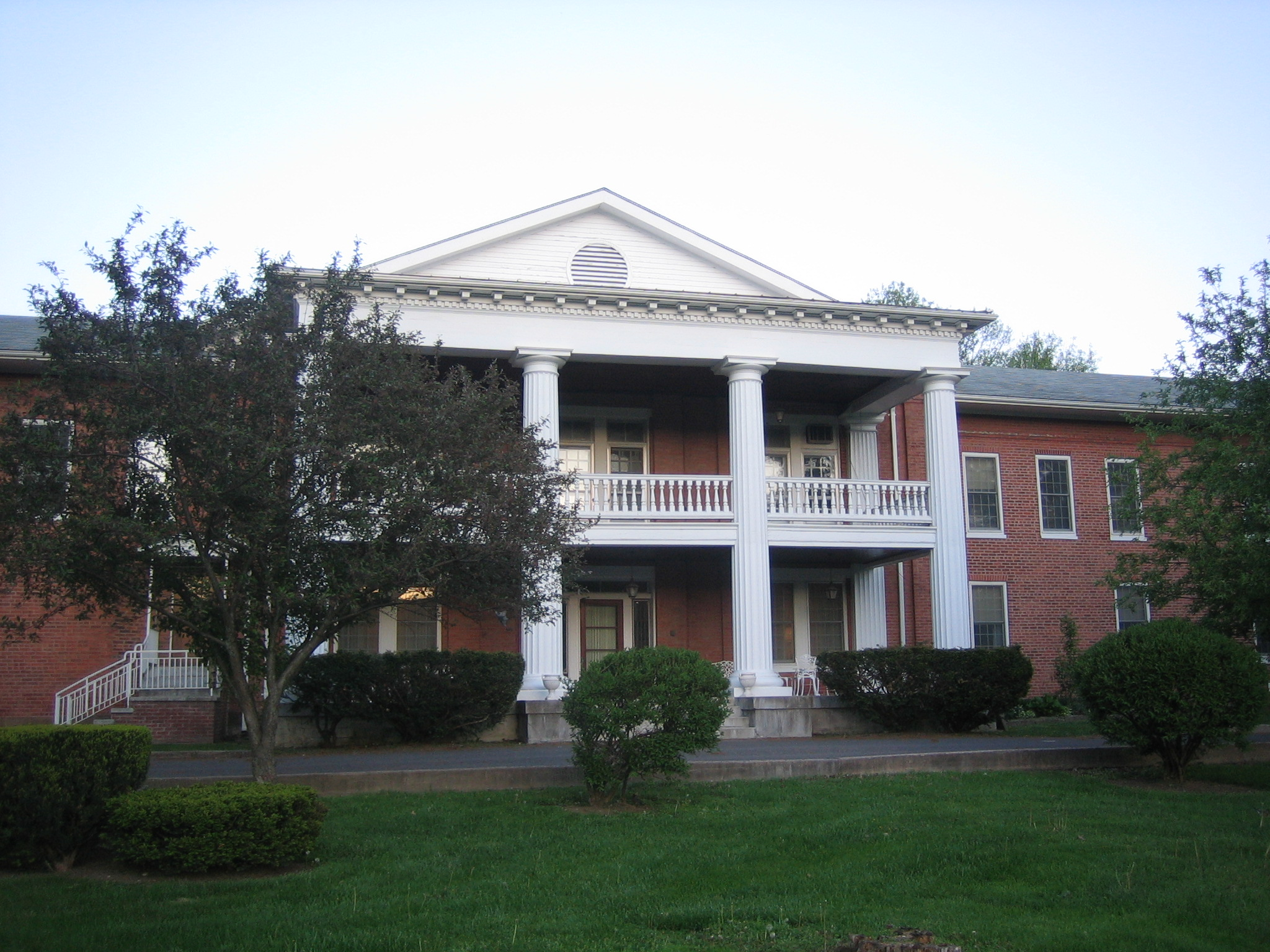
The central section (behind the portico) of the West Virginia Schools for the Deaf and the Blind administration building is the original Romney Classical Institute building.

The society's offer was the only one to include an extant building on its grounds. The Board of Regents accepted the society's offer, and a formal transfer of the Romney Classical Institute campus was made. During this process, the society discovered additional repairs were needed in order to satisfy the state's requirements. The society had to raise over $1,000 to adequately address these repairs, which was a difficult task during the economically distressed Reconstruction Era. Following a resolution on July 11, 1870, to raise between $1,200 and $1,300, a subscription of $1,383.60 was raised after 118 individuals and firms donated the needed funds. Shortly thereafter, the property's formal transfer was completed. The institute's property was valued at about $20,000 at this time.

The West Virginia Schools for the Deaf and the Blind opened on September 29, 1870, in the former Romney Classical Institute building, which provided space for administration offices, classrooms, and dormitories. Following the schools' subsequent expansions, the institute's former building became the center section of the administration building of the West Virginia Schools for the Deaf and the Blind, which it remains as of 2018. Between 1871 and 1872, the schools added two wings to the old institute building, each measuring 70 by 30 feet (21.3 by 9.1 m). The historic administration building was destroyed by fire on the morning of February 26, 2022. Following the transfer of the institute's campus, the Romney Literary Society built a new building between 1869 and 1870, which became known as Literary Hall.

== Alumni ==
The Romney Classical Institute educated several prominent educators, lawyers, military officers, politicians, and physicians. In West Virginia and Its People (1913), historians Thomas Condit Miller and Hu Maxwell averred that the Romney Classical Institute "exerted a great influence upon the educational work of the South Branch Valley." As stated above, John Jeremiah Jacob was educated at the institute and served as its assistant principal and principal. He was later elected West Virginia's first Democratic governor. West Virginia state senator William C. Clayton also attended the school and served as its principal. Craig Woodrow McDonald, son of Angus William McDonald, attended the school in its early years of operation. Following his education there, he attended the Virginia Military Institute and the University of Virginia, then taught school in Culpeper County. During the American Civil War, McDonald served in the Confederate States Army as aide-de-camp to General Arnold Elzey and was killed in battle on May 29, 1862. Robert White attended the institute prior to serving as a law apprentice under his father John Baker White, Hampshire County Clerk of Court, and attending Lexington Law School. White later served as Attorney General of West Virginia. Prominent Western Maryland physician Dr. Bayard T. Keller received his primary education at Romney Classical Institute and afterward continued his studies at Allegany County Academy in Cumberland, the University of Maryland, and the Baltimore Infirmary and practiced medicine in nearby Grantsville and Oakland.

== Bibliography ==
- Atkinson, George Wesley (1919). Bench and Bar of West Virginia. Charleston, West Virginia: Virginia Law Book Company. OCLC 8899470 – via Internet Archive.
- Atkinson, George Wesley; Gibbens, Alvaro Franklin (1890). Prominent Men of West Virginia: Biographical Sketches of Representative Men in Every Honorable Vocation, Including Politics, the Law, Theology, Medicine, Education, Finance, Journalism, Trade, Commerce and Agriculture. Wheeling, West Virginia: W. L. Callin. OCLC 3886825 – via Internet Archive.
- Biographical Publishing Company (1903). Men of West Virginia, Volume 2. Chicago: Biographical Publishing Company. OCLC 670364755 – via Internet Archive.
- Brannon, Selden W., ed. (1976). Historic Hampshire: A Symposium of Hampshire County and Its People, Past and Present. Parsons, West Virginia: McClain Printing Company. ISBN 978-0-87012-236-1. OCLC 3121468.
- Chapman Publishing Company (1895). Portrait and Biographical Record of Rockland and Orange Counties, New York. New York City: Chapman Publishing Company. OCLC 181190485 – via Internet Archive.
- Federal Writers' Project (1937). Historic Romney 1762–1937. Romney, West Virginia: Federal Writers' Project, The Town Council of Romney, West Virginia. OCLC 2006735. Archived from the original on January 1, 2014.
- Jewett, Charles C. (1851). Notices of Public Libraries in the United States of America. Washington, D.C.: Smithsonian Institution. OCLC 11908184 – via Internet Archive.
- Lewis, Virgil Anson (1889). History of West Virginia: In Two Parts. Philadelphia: Hubbard Brothers. OCLC 4270768 – via Internet Archive.
- Maxwell, Hu; Swisher, Howard Llewellyn (1897). History of Hampshire County, West Virginia From Its Earliest Settlement to the Present. Morgantown, West Virginia: A. Brown Boughner, Printer. OCLC 680931891. OL 23304577M.
- Miller, Thomas Condit; Maxwell, Hu (1913). West Virginia and Its People. New York City: Lewis Historical Publishing Company. OCLC 1449151 – via Internet Archive.
- Munske, Roberta R.; Kerns, Wilmer L., eds. (2004). Hampshire County, West Virginia, 1754–2004. Romney, West Virginia: The Hampshire County 250th Anniversary Committee. ISBN 978-0-9715738-2-6. OCLC 55983178.
- Norona, Delf (1958). West Virginia Imprints, 1790-1863: A Checklist of Books, Newspapers, Periodicals, and Broadsides. Moundsville, West Virginia: West Virginia Library Association. OCLC 863601 – via Internet Archive.
- Rhees, William Jones (1859). Manual of Public Libraries, Institutions, and Societies: In the United States, and British Provinces of North America. Philadelphia: J. B. Lippincott. OCLC 432847418 – via Internet Archive.
- Rice, Otis K.; Brown, Stephen W. (2010). West Virginia: A History. Lexington, Kentucky: University Press of Kentucky. ISBN 978-0-8131-3766-7. OCLC 781438959. Archived from the original on December 1, 2015 – via Google Books.
- Scharf, John Thomas (1882). History of Western Maryland: Being a History of Frederick, Montgomery, Carroll, Washington, Allegany, and Garrett Counties from the Earliest Period to the Present Day; Including Biographical Sketches of Their Representative Men. Philadelphia: Louis H. Everts and Co. OCLC 24044630 – via Internet Archive.
- Virginia General Assembly (1850). Journal of the House of Delegates of the Commonwealth of Virginia for the Session of 1850–51. Richmond, Virginia: William F. Ritchie, Public Printer. OCLC 434120241. Archived from the original on November 15, 2015 – via Google Books.
- West Virginia Department of Education; State Superintendent of Schools (1907). The History of Education in West Virginia. Charleston, West Virginia: Tribune Printing Company. OCLC 6380608 – via Internet Archive.
- Whitehill, Alexander Reid (1902). History of Education in West Virginia. Washington, D.C.: Government Printing Office. OCLC 2860098. Archived from the original on November 26, 2015 – via Google Books.
- Williams, Flora McDonald (1911). The Glengarry McDonalds of Virginia. Louisville, Kentucky: George G. Fetter Company. OCLC 5149045 – via Internet Archive.
