= William C. Clayton =

American educator, lawyer, politician, and businessperson

Honorable William C. Clayton

Member of the West Virginia Senate from the 11th district
- In office 1875–1879 Serving with R. B. Sherrard; David Pugh

Personal details
- Born: January 24, 1831 Hampshire County, Virginia (present-day West Virginia)
- Died: March 11, 1915 (aged 84) Keyser, West Virginia
- Resting place: Indian Mound Cemetery, Romney, West Virginia
- Party: Democratic Party
- Spouse: Isabella Paxton Schultze Clayton
- Children: Bessie Clayton
- Parent(s): Dr. Townsend Clayton (father); Susan O'Hara Heiskell (mother)
- Education: University of Virginia
- Profession: Educator, lawyer, politician, and businessperson

William C. Clayton (January 24, 1831 – March 11, 1915) was an American educator, lawyer, politician, and businessperson in the U.S. state of West Virginia. Clayton served in the West Virginia Senate representing the Eleventh Senatorial District of West Virginia from 1875 until 1879. He was twice principal of the Romney Classical Institute in Romney in 1853 and 1866.

Clayton was born in 1831 in Hampshire County, Virginia (present-day West Virginia). He received his early education at home from his father, Dr. Townsend Clayton, and attended Romney Academy and the Romney Classical Institute. Clayton continued his post-secondary education at the University of Virginia between 1846 and 1848. Following his graduation, he taught in Amelia County, and served as principal of Washington Academy in Georgetown, Washington, D.C., the Charlestown Academy in Charles Town, and the Romney Classical Institute in 1853 and 1866. He relocated to Romney in 1859 where he began practicing law, and relocated to Keyser in 1873, where he established a law practice.

He was elected to the West Virginia Senate in 1874 and served alongside R. B. Sherrard and David Pugh, representing West Virginia's 11th Senate district. He unsuccessfully ran for election in the Twelfth Senatorial District for a judicial seat in 1883. In 1890, he served as the vice president of the West Virginia Bar Association from West Virginia's 2nd congressional district. By 1907, he was president of the Mineral County Bar Association, and in 1909 he served on the bar association's Committee on Legal Education. In 1892 Clayton was under consideration as a Democratic candidate for a long term on the Supreme Court of Appeals of West Virginia, but was not elected as the party's candidate at the state convention.

Clayton was an incorporator, shareholder, and director of several West Virginia businesses. In 1882, he was named by the Virginia General Assembly as a trustee of the Virginia and West Virginia Railroad Company. In 1889 he was an incorporator of the Alexander Boom and Lumber Company, and in 1890 he was both an incorporator and a director of the Patterson's Creek and Potomac Railroad Company. In addition, Clayton was a director of the People's Bank of Keyser. He practiced law until the year prior to his death, and died in 1915 at his residence in Keyser after an illness. Following his death, The Pittsburgh Post described Clayton as the "nestor" of the Mineral County bar.

== Early life and academic career ==
William C. Clayton was born on January 24, 1831, in Hampshire County, Virginia (present-day West Virginia). He was the son of Dr. Townsend Clayton, a physician in Hampshire County, and his wife, Susan O'Hara Heiskell Clayton. Clayton received his early education from his father at home. He then received a collegiate preparatory education at both Romney Academy and Romney Classical Institute under the academic tutelage of William Henry Foote. He continued his studies at the University of Virginia in the 1846, 1847, and 1848 academic sessions, and graduated from his separate classes there.

Following his graduation from the University of Virginia, Clayton taught in various schools. He taught in Amelia County, Virginia, and then served as principal of Washington Academy in Georgetown, Washington, D.C. and Charlestown Academy in Charles Town. According to an advertisement for a female teacher in The Baltimore Sun on November 9, 1853, Clayton was serving as the principal of the Romney Classical Institute in 1853. Clayton stated in the advertisement that the institute was seeking an experienced female teacher to lead the school's Female Department. The candidate was to be qualified to teach French, English, and music. Just after the American Civil War, in 1866, he again served as the principal of the Romney Classical Institute for several academic sessions.

== Law and political careers ==
Following his graduation from the University of Virginia, Clayton studied law and he was admitted to the bar in Winchester, Virginia, around 1858. He relocated to Romney in 1859 and was admitted to the bar there. He was again admitted to the practice of law in Romney on May 12, 1866. He continued the practice of law during his tenure as the principal of the Romney Classical Institute. Clayton retook the oath to practice law in Romney in April 1872. He relocated to Keyser in the winter of 1873 and established a law practice there. However, he also continued to practice law in the counties of the South Branch Potomac River valley. Following his relocation to Keyser, Clayton became the oldest member of the Mineral County bar.

On September 11, 1874, he was nominated as the West Virginia Democratic Party candidate for the West Virginia Senate seat at the party's 11th Senate district convention in Petersburg. In November 1874 Clayton won his election to the senate seat and represented the district alongside R. B. Sherrard of Hardy County. Clayton first served in the West Virginia Legislature's 12th Legislative Session, which convened in Charleston on January 13, 1875, and adjourned on December 23, 1875. He served in the 13th Legislative Session of 1876, and in the 14th legislative session of 1877 when he served as senator from the 11th Senate district alongside David Pugh of Hampshire County. Clayton served in the state senate until 1879. During his tenure in the state senate, Clayton introduced and procured the passage of a bill creating the Independent School District of Keyser. He then became a member of the school district's board of commissioners to organize the district and its schools.

Clayton became a special judge, and held several terms of the circuit court in Grant, Hardy, and Mineral counties. In the judicial election of November 6, 1883, in 12th West Virginia Judicial Circuit, Clayton ran for election against James Dillon Armstrong and lost with 1,969 votes to Armstrong's 6,203. In 1887, Clayton was admitted to practice law in the courts of Randolph County. By 1890, Clayton was still engaged in the practice of law with a lucrative practice in Keyser. He was a member of the West Virginia Bar Association, and in 1890 he served as a vice president of the organization from West Virginia's 2nd congressional district. In June 1890, Clayton attended the association's meeting on Blennerhassett Island, near Parkersburg, where he served on a committee that drafted the bar association's resolution on the legal rights of married women. On July 1 of that year, Clayton was also selected to serve on the association's Committee of Legal Biography, on which he served as its chairperson. In 1907 he was president of the Mineral County Bar Association. By 1909, he served on the West Virginia Bar Association's Committee on Legal Education. He attended the association's annual meeting in Webster Springs, July 7–8, 1909.

In March 1891, Clayton and C. Wood Daily of Keyser argued on behalf of the West Virginia Central and Pittsburgh Railway Company in a mandamus case at the Supreme Court of Appeals of West Virginia brought by a director of the company, W. Irvine Cross. Alex Shaw of Baltimore claimed his right to cumulate his stock ownership in the company, and elected Cross as a director of the company. On March 24, the court ruled that the company was governed by the cumulative method, and therefore, Cross was entitled to his director seat.

In April 1892, Clayton was under consideration as a Democratic candidate for a long term on the Supreme Court of Appeals of West Virginia. At the West Virginia Democratic Party State Convention in August 1892, held in Parkersburg, Marmaduke H. Dent was elected as the party's candidate for election to the long term, beating out Clayton, Joseph Moreland, and Robert W. Monroe.

== Business pursuits ==
Clayton was an incorporator, shareholder, and director of several West Virginia businesses. On February 21, 1882, the Virginia General Assembly passed an act of incorporation of the Virginia and West Virginia Railroad Company and named Clayton as one of the "body corporate and politic" of the company. The railroad was to have been constructed from the West Virginia–Virginia state line in either Frederick or Shenandoah counties in Virginia to Alexandria or another point on the Potomac River near Alexandria. In July 1889, Clayton was an incorporator with $100 in shares of the Alexander Boom and Lumber Company, which constructed, operated, and maintained log booms across the Buckhannon River near the confluence of the river's Left Fork and Right Fork tributaries in Upshur County.

Clayton was an incorporator and a director of the Patterson's Creek and Potomac Railroad Company, which was chartered on March 15, 1900, with a capital stock of $20,000. The railroad was to be constructed from Patterson Creek on the North Branch Potomac River, to a point along the North Branch Potomac River between Short Gap and Pinto, thus acting as a 5.42-mile (8.72 km) cut-off around the congested Cumberland Rail Yard in Cumberland. The railroad was to reduce the distance along the Baltimore and Ohio Railroad Main Line by 10.5 miles (16.9 km). The Patterson's Creek and Potomac Railroad Company was charged with the railroad's construction and was to operate the venture from an office in Keyser. On April 5, 1900, the company was formally organized at a meeting held at a Baltimore and Ohio Railroad office in Keyser where Clayton was elected as a director. It was decided at the meeting that construction was to begin on both ends of the railroad, which was to include the construction of one tunnel measuring 4,000 feet (1,200 m) in length. By January 1901, no track had been laid, and the tunnel had not begun construction, which had been estimated to take a year to complete. The Patterson Creek Cutoff was completed in 1903, and by 1905, it was assessed at a value of $67,850.00 and was also known as the "Pinto Cut-Off." By 1912, the Patterson's Creek and Potomac Railroad Company had become a subsidiary of the Baltimore and Ohio Railroad and on September 25 of that year, it was finally merged with its parent company along with its other West Virginia subsidiaries.

In March 1909, Clayton was reelected as a director of the People's Bank of Keyser.

== Later life and death ==
He continued to be active into his later years. In 1912 he participated in an automotive procession to Moorefield with other prominent local attorneys to attend the funeral of Moorefield lawyer Benjamin Dailey. Clayton continued to practice law until the year before his death in 1915.

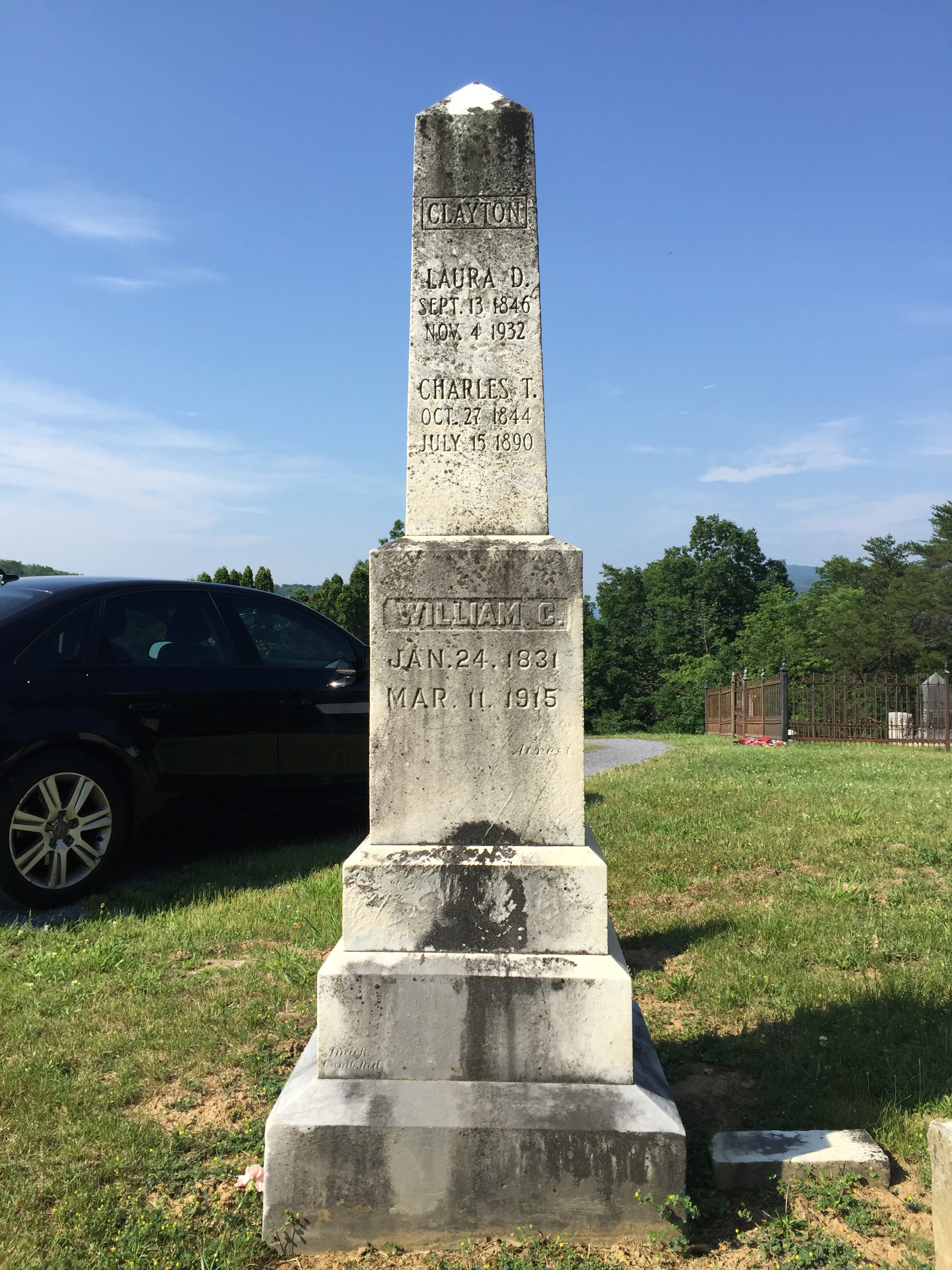
Obelisk gravestone of Clayton, his brother Charles T. Clayton, and his sister-in-law Laura D. Clayton, at Indian Mound Cemetery in Romney.

Clayton died on March 11, 1915, at his residence in Keyser at the age of 84, following an illness. Clayton was survived by his sister Clara Clayton, and his nephew Charles T. Clayton of Washington, D.C., who was a private secretary to David John Lewis, U.S. House Representative from Maryland. In his obituary in The Pittsburgh Post, Clayton was described as the "nestor" of the Mineral County bar. He was interred at Indian Mound Cemetery in Romney near his wife, Isabella. He shares an obelisk gravestone with his brother Charles T. Clayton and sister-in-law Laura D. Clayton.

== Personal life and marriage ==
Clayton married Isabella Paxton Schultze (March 9, 1835 – September 27, 1891). Schultze was born in Edinburgh, Scotland, on March 9, 1835, and was the daughter of Dr. Robert Schultze and his wife Elizabeth "Bessie" Armstrong Schultze. Her sister was Elizabeth "Bessie" Jane Schultze, the first wife of Christian Streit White, Hampshire County Clerk of Court and, later, President of the West Virginia Fish Commission. Her father, Dr. Robert Schultze, was a professor of foreign languages at the University of Edinburgh. Dr. Schultze also served in the British Diplomatic Service. Clayton and his wife had one child, Bessie Clayton, who was born on October 3, 1873, and died on August 21, 1874.

On September 27, 1891, at 19:00, Clayton's wife died at their residence in Keyser as a result of contracting typhoid fever. She was buried at Indian Mound Cemetery in Romney.

=== Religion ===
Clayton was of Presbyterian faith and was an active member and a ruling elder of the Winchester Presbytery. In May 1895, Clayton served on a special committee that conducted in an investigation over the expulsion of members of the Presbytery's church in Gerrardstown.

== Bibliography ==
- Atkinson, George Wesley; Gibbens, Alvaro Franklin (1890). Prominent Men of West Virginia: Biographical Sketches of Representative Men in Every Honorable Vocation, Including Politics, the Law, Theology, Medicine, Education, Finance, Journalism, Trade, Commerce and Agriculture. Wheeling, West Virginia: W. L. Callin. OCLC 3886825 – via Internet Archive.
- Atkinson, George Wesley (1919). Bench and Bar of West Virginia. Charleston, West Virginia: Virginia Law Book Company. OCLC 8899470 – via Internet Archive.
- Bosworth, A. S. (2009). A History of Randolph County, West Virginia: From Its Earliest Exploration and Settlement to the Present Time. Baltimore: Genealogical Publishing Company. ISBN 978-0-8063-4700-4. OCLC 37663291. Archived from the original on May 11, 2016 – via Google Books.
- Brooks, A. B.; West Virginia Geological and Economic Survey (1910). West Virginia Geological Survey, Volume 5: Forestry and Wood Industries. Morgantown, West Virginia: Acme Publishing Company. OCLC 25486611. Archived from the original on May 21, 2016 – via Google Books.
- Lewis, Virgil Anson (1889). History of West Virginia: In Two Parts. Philadelphia: Hubbard Brothers. OCLC 4270768 – via Internet Archive.
- Maxwell, Hu; Swisher, Howard Llewellyn (1897). History of Hampshire County, West Virginia From Its Earliest Settlement to the Present. Morgantown, West Virginia: A. Brown Boughner, Printer. OCLC 680931891. OL 23304577M.
- Tribune Printing Company (1907). Decisions of Circuit Courts of West Virginia, Volume 1: Railroad Assessments. Charleston, West Virginia: Tribune Printing Company. OCLC 676721694. Archived from the original on April 25, 2016 – via Google Books.
- Virginia General Assembly (1882). Acts and Joint Resolutions Passed By the General Assembly of the State of Virginia During the Session of 1881–82. Richmond, Virginia: R. F. Walker, Superintendent of Public Printing. OCLC 70895973. Archived from the original on June 9, 2016 – via Google Books.
- West Virginia Bar Association (1908). Proceedings of the Twenty-Third Annual Meeting of the West Virginia Bar Association Held at New Martinsville, West Virginia on December 31, 1907, and January 1, 1908. Morgantown, West Virginia: The Acme Publishing Company. OCLC 11874180. Archived from the original on May 4, 2016 – via Google Books.
- West Virginia Bar Association (1910). Proceedings of the Twenty-Fifth Annual Meeting of the West Virginia Bar Association Held at Webster Springs, West Virginia July 7 and 8, 1909. Sistersville, West Virginia: The Oil Review Publishing Company. OCLC 11874180. Archived from the original on May 22, 2016 – via Google Books.
- West Virginia Bar Association (1915). Proceedings of the Thirty-First Annual Meeting of the West Virginia Bar Association Held at Clarksburg, West Virginia. OCLC 11874180. Archived from the original on April 23, 2016 – via Google Books.
