= Romney Academy =

Location
- North High Street; Romney, Virginia (now West Virginia); United States
- Coordinates: 39.342421°N 78.755951°W

Information
- Established: 1752; 274 years ago (first school construction); January 11, 1814 (first incorporation)
- Founder: Virginia General Assembly; Romney Literary Society
- Closed: 1846 (reorganized as the Romney Classical Institute)
- Area trustee: From 1839: David Gibson; John Baker White; Angus William McDonald; Daniel Mytinger; John Kern, Jr.
- Principal: Dr. Henry Johnston (1820–1826); Dr. William Henry Foote (1826–?); Rev. Theodore Gallaudet; Benjamin E. Pigman
- Faculty: Mr. Brown; Samuel Mulledy; Thomas Mulledy; E. W. Newton; Silas C. Walker

Romney Academy was an institution for higher education in Romney, Virginia (now West Virginia), United States. Romney Academy was first incorporated by the Virginia General Assembly on January 11, 1814, and was active until 1846 when it was reorganized as the Romney Classical Institute. In addition to the Romney Classical Institute, Romney Academy was also a forerunner institution to Potomac Seminary. Romney Academy was one of the earliest institutions for higher learning within the present boundaries of the state of West Virginia.

With the growth of settlement in Pearsall's Flats, which was later the location of Romney, the need for educational facilities became apparent and the community began plans for the establishment of schools and churches. A log structure, which served as both a school and a church, was built at Pearsall's Flats around 1752 near Fort Pearsall. By the time the town of Romney was laid out in 1762, the log school was still in existence. That year, a stone school building was erected on the site to the immediate north of the old Hampshire County Courthouse and became known as Romney Academy.

Local education, including Romney Academy, continued to depend exclusively upon subscriptions until 1810 when the Virginia General Assembly passed what was known as the "Literary Fund". The assembly first incorporated Romney Academy on January 11, 1814. In 1817, the assembly passed a bill for the incorporating the trustees of Romney Academy. The Virginia General Assembly reincorporated Romney Academy on February 11, 1818, and on March 25, 1820. In 1820, as a result of a movement and debate for higher education by the Romney Literary Society, Romney Academy incorporated classical studies into its curriculum, thus making it the first institution of higher education in the region. By 1831, Romney Academy had outgrown its facilities, and the Romney Literary Society was given authorization to raise monies from a lottery to build a new school building. The society successfully raised the funds, and in 1845 bids were called for the construction of a new school building.

On December 12, 1846, the Virginia General Assembly empowered the Romney Literary Society to establish a seminary for learning at the academy. That same year, a new brick building was constructed for the academy and for the library of the society; the building now serves as the central unit of the administration building of the West Virginia Schools for the Deaf and Blind. Romney Academy was administered under the leadership of scholarly Englishman Dr. Henry Johnston, who was succeeded by Presbyterian Reverend and historian Dr. William Henry Foote. Foote introduced courses in theology into the school's curriculum. As the school's popularity grew and knowledge of its curriculum under Dr. Foote spread, Romney Academy began to attract students from beyond the South Branch Potomac River valley region. Other educators at Romney Academy during its early years were E. W. Newton, Silas C. Walker, Thomas Mulledy, and Samuel Mulledy. Thomas and Samuel Mulledy each later served as presidents of Georgetown University in Washington, D.C.

== Background ==
The land upon which Romney Academy was established was originally part of the Northern Neck Proprietary, a land grant that the exiled Charles II awarded to seven of his supporters in 1649 during the English Interregnum. Following the Restoration in 1660, Charles II finally ascended to the English throne. Charles II renewed the Northern Neck Proprietary grant in 1662, revised it in 1669, and again renewed the original grant favoring original grantee Thomas Colepeper, 2nd Baron Colepeper and Henry Bennet, 1st Earl of Arlington in 1672. In 1681, Bennet sold his share to Lord Colepeper, and Lord Colepeper received a new charter for the entire land grant from James II in 1688. Following the deaths of Lord Colepeper, his wife Margaret, and his daughter Katherine, the Northern Neck Proprietary passed to Katherine's son Thomas Fairfax, 6th Lord Fairfax of Cameron in 1719. The South Branch Survey of the Northern Neck Proprietary extended from the north end of The Trough to the confluence of the North and South Branches of the Potomac River. Lord Fairfax originally planned to maintain the South Branch Survey as his personal manor but later commissioned James Genn to survey the South Branch Potomac River lowlands for sale in 1748, with land lots ranging in size from 300 acres (120 ha) to 400 acres (160 ha).

Romney and its environs within the South Branch Survey were originally settled in the 1730s by Job Pearsall, and by 1748 approximately 200 people had settled at what was then known as Pearsall's Flats. Prior to 1762, Lord Fairfax sent surveyors into Hampshire County, who were charged with the selection of a site for what would later become the town of Romney. Pearsall's Flats was selected as the site due to its already having Fort Pearsall, a courthouse, and natural topographical advantages. Lord Fairfax commissioned a survey of Romney, and the town was laid out into 25 2-acre blocks with eight streets in a grid pattern in 1762. On December 13, 1762, the Virginia General Assembly recognized the stability of the upper Potomac frontier when it passed a bill establishing the town of Romney, and the bill was signed by Governor Francis Fauquier on December 23, 1762.

In the early years in western Virginia, pioneer settlers were primarily concerned with providing defense from Native American attacks, so little emphasis was placed upon education. Education was viewed as a religious duty, to be provided for at home, where its quality was dependent upon the spare time and level of education of parents. With the growth of settlement in Pearsall's Flats, and later Romney, the need for educational facilities became apparent and the community began plans for the establishment of schools and churches.

A log structure, which served as both a school and a church, was built at Pearsall's Flats around 1752 near Fort Pearsall. During his travels in western Virginia in 1753, George Washington made mention of this structure. The log building was constructed of roughly hewn logs with clay chinking and contained puncheon log floors, hewn side up, clapboard doors, and one small window covered by a paper greased with lard. Light in the log structure was provided by the small window and a fireplace measuring 8 feet (2.4 m) in height, which contained a tall pile of logs during the winter to provide for warmth in addition to lighting. The school's teachers were paid by subscriptions from the attending students. To provide for a teacher's payment, a form was circulated around Romney and each parent indicated on the paper how many of their children would attend the school and the type of payment the teacher would expect, whether in the form of cash remuneration, produce, or boarding. These early teachers were usually "wandering pedagogues, settling wherever they could obtain enough signers to insure a living".

By the time the surveyors on behalf of Lord Fairfax had laid out the town of Romney in 1762, the log school was still in existence along with other public buildings. Later in 1762 following the establishment of Romney, the school was rebuilt in stone on the same site. The stone building was erected on the site to the immediate north of the old Hampshire County Courthouse and became known as Romney Academy. The stone building was a rugged square building that served as Romney's cultural center before the school was formally incorporated by the Virginia General Assembly, but the exact date of its construction is unknown. Romney Academy was first incorporated by the Virginia General Assembly on January 11, 1814.

Following the American Revolutionary War, education in Virginia was provided predominantly by private "district schools" whose curriculum was decided by the people who funded them. On February 8, 1817, the first comprehensive bill for public education in the southern United States was introduced to the Virginia House of Delegates by Federalist delegate Charles F. Mercer. Mercer's bill provided for a centralized system for public education that was to be administered by a board of education and financed by the state of Virginia. The bill stated that primary schools were to be established first for "all free white children ... free of any charge whatever" and provided for the establishment of a system of academies, 48 for males and three for females, and four colleges that were to be dispersed throughout Virginia, and a university to be founded in a centralized location. The bill faced substantial partisan opposition and eventually failed. Despite the bill's failure, the Virginia General Assembly continued incorporated academies or "classical schools" throughout the state to provide primary and secondary education. Despite being incorporated by the assembly, the academies were not public and were instead funded through tuition fees, which were generally low but prevented a larger number of students from attending them. By 1860, the Virginia General Assembly had incorporated 250 of these academies, including Romney Academy.

== Establishment and development ==
Local education, including Romney Academy, continued to depend upon subscriptions exclusively until 1810 when the Virginia General Assembly passed what was known as the "Literary Fund", which was to be apportioned among the Virginia counties for the education of the poor. In 1817, a bill "incorporating the trustees of Romney Academy in the county of Hampshire" was presented to the Virginia House of Delegates by Mr. Scott, a delegate on the Committee of Schools and Colleges. The bill was read a second time in the Virginia House of Delegates following a motion by Hampshire County delegate William Naylor, after which it was ordered to be "re-committed to the Committee of Schools and Colleges". An amended version of the bill was again presented to the Virginia House of Delegates for a third time by Mr. Scott, and it was passed by the legislative body and renamed "an act incorporating the trustees of Romney Academy in the county of Hampshire".

A further provision for local education in Virginia was included in an act passed by the Virginia General Assembly in 1818 stating that: "It shall be the duty of the courts of the several counties, cities, and corporate towns—in the month of October or as soon thereafter as may be—to appoint not less than five or more than fifteen discreet persons to be called school commissioners." The commissioners who were appointed in Hampshire County were John McDowell, David Gibson, John Pierce, John Randalls, Elisha Thompson, Charles Keller, Frederick Sheets, James Abernathy, and Robert Sherard. Accounts rendered to the Hampshire County court for the expenditure of the Literary Fund illustrated that "the average price of tuition, exclusive of books, paper, etc. has been within a small fraction of four cents for every day of each attendance for each poor child." Because nearly 700 impoverished children in Hampshire County were entitled to the fund, each child was only able to receive only a few months' worth of schooling, and because of the limited facilities, only about half of the total number of eligible children were able to be taken care of at each of the two periods of enrollment.

Romney Academy was formally established on February 11, 1818, when the Virginia General Assembly finally passed an act entitled "an act incorporating the trustees of Romney academy, in the county of Hampshire" in which the assembly incorporated Romney Academy and constituted and appointed a board of trustees for the operation of the institution. With a system of formal education underway in Hampshire County, forces were underway for the higher education in the community.

On a winter evening in 1819, nine men in Romney conducting a meeting in the office of Dr. John Temple for the purpose "of taking into consideration the proprietary of financing a Society, having for its object the advancement of Literature and Science; the purchase of a Library by and for the use of its members; and their further improvement by discussing before the Society such questions as shall be selected under its directors." The nine men consisted of Thomas Blair, David Gibson, James P. Jack, Virginia author and historian Samuel Kercheval, Nathaniel Kuykendall, Charles T. Magill, James M. Stephens, John Temple, and W. C. Wodrow. Shortly after the formation of the Romney Literary Society, the society recognized that the quality of the education provided by Romney Academy and other local subscription schools was not meeting the needs of the Romney community, and therefore, it launched a movement to establish an institution for "the higher education of the youth of the community". The society frequently debated upon theories of education advancement and popular education. In 1820, as a result of this movement and debate, Romney Academy incorporated classical studies into its curriculum, thus making it the first institution of higher education in the region. The institution was again incorporated by the Virginia General Assembly on March 25, 1820.

By 1831, Romney Academy had outgrown its facilities, and the Romney Literary Society commenced its campaign to raise funds for a new academic building. On January 6, 1832, the Virginia General Assembly authorized the society to raise $20,000 by lottery for educational purposes. Following a ten-year lapse after this authorization, the society made arrangements with James Gregory of Jersey City, New Jersey, and Daniel McIntyre of Philadelphia to finance the lottery, "for raising a sum of money not exceeding Twenty Thousand dollars, for the purpose of erecting a suitable building for their accommodation, the purchase of a library and Philosophical apparatus". The lottery was to be conducted for a period lasting 10 years, and the sums of $750, $1,000, and $1,500 were to be raised in semi-annual installments. The society successfully raised the funds, and in 1845 bids were called for the construction of a new school building. On December 12, 1846, the Virginia General Assembly empowered the Romney Literary Society "to establish at or near the town of Romney a Seminary of Learning for the instruction of youth in various branches of science and literature; and the Society may appropriate to the same such portion of the property which it now has or may acquire, as it may deem expedient". That same year, a new brick building was constructed for the academy and for the library of the society, which now serves as the central unit of the administration building of the West Virginia Schools for the Deaf and Blind. Following the school's move to the building, it was reorganized as the Romney Classical Institute with Foote as its principal.

== Faculty and curriculum ==
The earliest faculty members of Romney Academy are unknown, but the institution's first principal and one of the institution's longest serving teachers from its era of infancy was scholarly Englishman Dr. Henry Johnston. Under Johnston's leadership, Romney Academy became known regionally for its courses in the "higher classics" and made Romney the seat of one of the Eastern Panhandle's most successful academies. Johnston believed in the "rule of the birch rod" and discipline was no light matter under his leadership. Some of Romney's prominent men in its early history were among Johnston's students. Other educators at Romney Academy during its early years were E. W. Newton, Silas C. Walker, a Mr. Brown, Thomas Mulledy, and Samuel Mulledy. Thomas and Samuel Mulledy each later served as presidents of Georgetown University in Washington, D.C.

Presbyterian Reverend and historian Dr. William Henry Foote succeeded Johnston as principal of Romney Academy around 1826. Foote served in that capacity until his departure from Romney around 1837 or 1839. Foote also concurrently served as the pastor of the Romney Presbyterian Church. Foote introduced courses in theology into the school's curriculum, which broadened the make-up of the student body to include young men preparing for the ministry. As the school's popularity grew and knowledge of its curriculum under Dr. Foote spread, Romney Academy began to attract students from beyond the South Branch Potomac River valley region. Following Foote's departure, Reverend Theodore Gallaudet served as Romney Academy's principal.

== Board of trustees ==
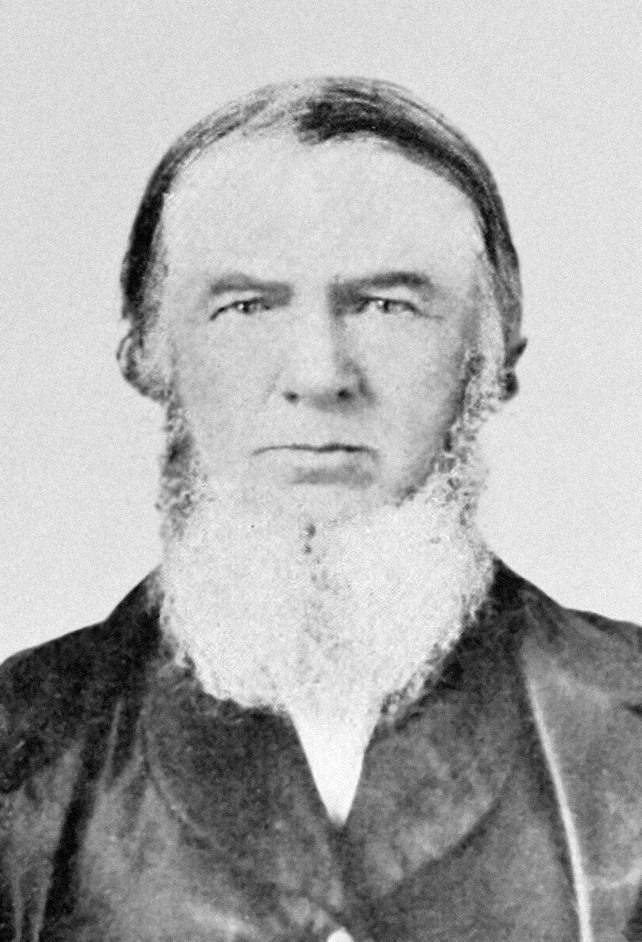
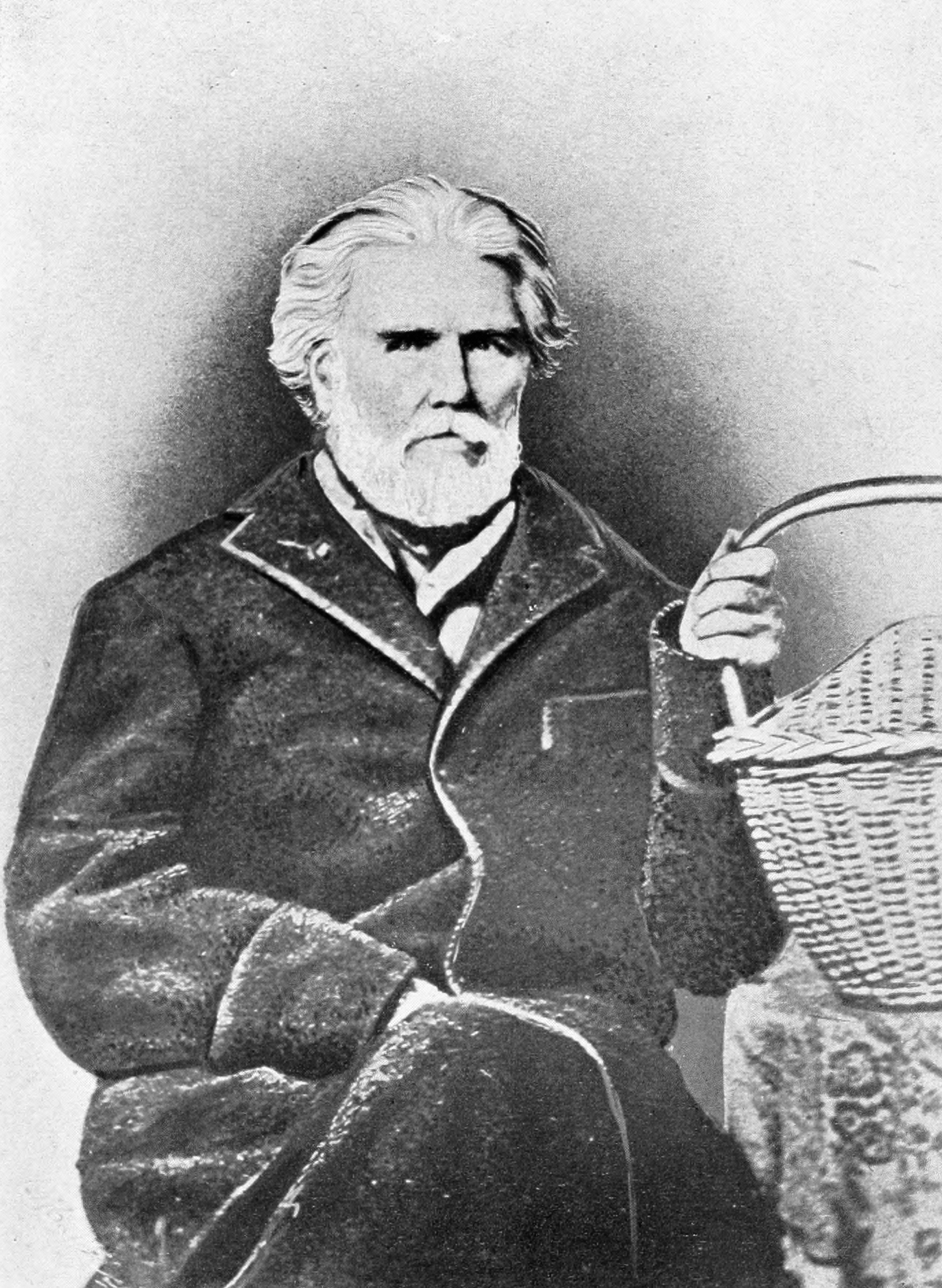
John Baker White (pictured left) and Angus William McDonald (pictured right) were members of the Romney Academy board of trustees following its reconstitution in 1839.

The inaugural board of trustees were constituted and appointed by the Virginia General Assembly in 1818. Because there were several vacancies among the board of trustees, on March 25, 1839, the Virginia General Assembly passed an act, appointing a new board of trustees consisting of David Gibson, John Baker White, Angus William McDonald, Daniel Mytinger, and John Kern, Jr. In addition, the 1839 act authorized any of the five appointed trustees of Romney Academy to fill vacancies on the board "occasioned by death, resignation, removal, or legal disability", thereby preventing future prolonged vacant trustee seats.

Romney Academy trustee John Baker White was a clerk of both the circuit and county courts of Hampshire County and was the father of Robert White, Attorney General of West Virginia from 1877 until 1881. Robert White successfully lobbied the West Virginia Legislature to pass an act establishing the Institution for the Deaf, Dumb, and Blind of West Virginia (later named the West Virginia Schools for the Deaf and Blind), which utilized the former campus of the Romney Classical Institute, a successor educational institution to Romney Academy. Another trustee, Angus William McDonald, was the father of Marshall McDonald, who served as commissioner of the United States Commission of Fish and Fisheries from 1888 until 1895.

== Building ==
Romney Academy utilized a native stone structure located behind the Hampshire County Courthouse at a site presently occupied by the Courthouse Annex building (1934) at 66 North High Street in Romney. According to West Virginia historians Hu Maxwell and Howard Llewellyn Swisher in their History of Hampshire County, West Virginia (1897), the Romney Academy building was one of the earliest educational facilities in the county and regarding its architecture, Maxwell and Swisher noted: "the rough unhewn stones of which the academy was built gave it a very uncouth exterior." By 1831, Romney Academy had outgrown its quarters in the old stone school building and relocated to a new Classical Revival structure completed in 1846, after which the institution was reorganized as the Romney Classical Institute.

After the academy's stone building ceased being used as an educational facility, it was subsequently utilized for various purposes including serving as the offices of the Virginia Argus and Hampshire Advertiser newspaper and as a meeting place for local fraternal organizations. Romney Academy's stone building remained dormant and unoccupied for a number of years and was demolished by the time Maxwell and Swisher researched and authored their History of Hampshire County, West Virginia in the late 1890s.

== Notable alumni ==
During its brief years of operation between 1814 and 1846, Romney Academy educated a number of notable alumni. According to Seldon Brannon's Historic Hampshire (1976), "among the pupils of this school were some of the most prominent men in the early history of the [Romney] community." The academy's students included William C. Clayton, a West Virginia state senator; John Jeremiah Jacob, 4th Governor of West Virginia; Angus William McDonald, Jr., a West Virginia lawyer, politician, and military officer; and Reverend Stuart Robinson, a Presbyterian minister, orator, writer, and editor.

== Legacy ==
According to West Virginia historian Hu Maxwell in his article entitled "West Virginia a Century Ago" published in The Transallegheny Historical Magazine (1901), Romney Academy was "one of the oldest and most renowned schools on the early soil of West Virginia". Of the institution, Maxwell stated that "from its halls went forth some of the teachers who became the disseminators of learning in the famous South Branch [valley]—whose people might appropriately be called the Phoenicians of the Alleghenies, the carriers of liberty, equality, and education."

== Bibliography ==
- Biographical Publishing Company (1903). Men of West Virginia, Volume 2. Biographical Publishing Company. OCLC 670364755. Archived from the original on November 15, 2013.
- Blue, John S. (1980). History & Tales of a Pioneer. Jasper County Abstract Co. ISBN 9780960447404. OCLC 6347541. Archived from the original on October 31, 2013.
- Blume, Kenneth J. (2011). Historical Dictionary of the U.S. Maritime Industry. Scarecrow Press. ISBN 978-0-8108-5634-9. OCLC 741415839. Archived from the original on November 13, 2013.
- Brannon, Selden W., ed. (1976). Historic Hampshire: A Symposium of Hampshire County and Its People, Past and Present. Parsons, West Virginia: McClain Printing Company. ISBN 978-0-87012-236-1. OCLC 3121468.
- Coleman, Roy V. (1951). Liberty and Property. New York City: Scribner. OCLC 1020487.
- Crowell, Edward Payson; Biscoe, Walter Stanley (1883). William Lewis Montague (ed.). Biographical Record of the Alumni of Amherst College During its First Half Century, 1821–1871. The College.
- Egerton, Douglas R. (April 1985). "To the Tombs of the Capulets: Charles Fenton Mercer and Public Education in Virginia, 1816–1817". The Virginia Magazine of History and Biography. 93 (1). Richmond, Virginia: Virginia Historical Society: 155–174. JSTOR 4244181. OCLC 82926642.
- Federal Writers' Project (1937). Historic Romney 1762–1937. Romney, West Virginia: Federal Writers' Project, The Town Council of Romney, West Virginia. OCLC 2006735. Archived from the original on January 1, 2014.
- Hendricks, Christopher E. (2006). The Backcountry Towns of Colonial Virginia. University of Tennessee Press. ISBN 978-1-57233-543-1. OCLC 64624884. Archived from the original on January 4, 2014.
- Maxwell, Hu; Swisher, Howard Llewellyn (1897). History of Hampshire County, West Virginia From Its Earliest Settlement to the Present. Morgantown, West Virginia: A. Brown Boughner, Printer. OCLC 1305960. OL 23304577M.
- Maxwell, Hu (1901). "West Virginia a Century Ago". The Transallegheny Historical Magazine. 1. Transallegheny Historical Society: 234–236. Archived from the original on January 4, 2014.
- Miller, Thomas Condit; Maxwell, Hu (1913). West Virginia and Its People. New York City: Lewis Historical Publishing Company. OCLC 1449151.
- Morrison, Alfred James (1917). The Beginnings of Public Education in Virginia, 1776–1860: Study of Secondary Schools in Relation to the State Literary Fund, Volume 187. D. Bottom, Superintendent of Public Printing. Archived from the original on January 4, 2014.
- Munske, Roberta R.; Kerns, Wilmer L., eds. (2004). Hampshire County, West Virginia, 1754–2004. Romney, West Virginia: The Hampshire County 250th Anniversary Committee. ISBN 978-0-9715738-2-6. OCLC 55983178.
- Rice, Otis K. (2015). The Allegheny Frontier: West Virginia Beginnings, 1730–1830. Lexington, Kentucky: University Press of Kentucky. ISBN 978-0-8131-6438-0. OCLC 900345296. Archived from the original on May 27, 2016.
- Rose, Cornelia Bruère (1976). Arlington County, Virginia: A History. Arlington County, Virginia: Arlington Historical Society. OCLC 2401541. Archived from the original on April 2, 2016.
- Rowe, Alan; Riebe, Erin; Rasmussen, Barbara E. (2003). National Register of Historic Places Registration Form: Hampshire County Courthouse (PDF). United States Department of the Interior, National Park Service. Archived (PDF) from the original on October 14, 2011.
- Virginia General Assembly (1839). Acts passed at a General Assembly of the Commonwealth of Virginia. Virginia General Assembly. Archived from the original on January 4, 2014.
- Virginia House of Delegates (1817). Journal of the House of Delegates of the Commonwealth of Virginia. Commonwealth of Virginia. Archived from the original on January 4, 2014.
- West Virginia Bar Association (1915). Report of the West Virginia Bar Association: Including Proceedings of the Annual Meeting, Volume 31. West Virginia Bar Association. OCLC 1588346. Archived from the original on May 4, 2016.
- West Virginia Geological and Economic Survey (1927). Hampshire and Hardy Counties, Volume 1. Morgantown Printing and Binding Company. OCLC 614539199. Archived from the original on November 3, 2013.
- William and Mary Quarterly (April 1898). "The Northern Neck of Virginia". William and Mary Quarterly. 6 (4). Williamsburg, Virginia: College of William & Mary: 222–226. doi:10.2307/1915885. ISSN 0043-5597. JSTOR 1915885. OCLC 1607858.
- Williams, Flora McDonald (1911). The Glengarry McDonalds of Virginia. Louisville, Kentucky: George G. Fetter Company. OCLC 5149045.
