= Otis K. Rice =

American historian (1919–2003)

Otis Kermit Rice (June 6, 1919 – September 22, 2003) was an American academic historian specializing in West Virginia history. His career was mostly at the West Virginia Institute of Technology (1957–87) at Montgomery where he was chairman of the history department and dean of the School of Human Studies. In 2003 he became West Virginia’s first Historian Laureate.

== Works ==
=== Books ===
- The Allegheny Frontier: West Virginia Beginnings, 1730-1830 (1970), University of Kentucky Press
- Charleston and the Kanawha Valley: An Illustrated History (1981), Woodland Hills, California: Windsor Publications
- The Hatfields and the McCoys (1982), University Press of Kentucky
- History of the New River Gorge Area (1984), West Virginia Institute of Technology
- West Virginia: A History (1985; 2nd edition 1993; with Stephen W. Brown), Both editions: University Press of Kentucky
- A History of Greenbrier County (1986), Greenbrier Historical Society
- Sheltering Arms Hospital (with Wayne Williams)
- The Mountain State: An Introduction to West Virginia (1997; with Stephen W. Brown)
- A Centennial of Strength: A History of Banking in West Virginia (1991), Charleston: West Virginia Bankers Association; (with Stephen W. Brown)
- Frontier Kentucky (1993), University Press of Kentucky
- West Virginia: The State and Its People (1997), Parsons, West Virginia: McClain Printing Company

=== Monographs ===
- "Importations of Cattle into Kentucky, 1790-1830" (1951), Register of the Kentucky Historical Society; 49: 35-47.
- "The Sandy Creek Expedition of 1756" (1951), West Virginia History; 13: 5-19.
- "West Virginia Printers and Their Work, 1790-1830" (1953), West Virginia History; 14: 297-338.
- "Coal Mining in the Kanawha Valley to 1861: A View of Industrialization in the Old South" (1965), Journal of Southern History; 31: 393-416 (November issue).
- "Eli Thayer and the Friendly Invasion of Virginia" (1971), Journal of Southern History; 37: 575-96.
