= Romney, West Virginia, in the American Civil War =

The town of Romney, Virginia (now West Virginia), traded hands between the Union Army and Confederate States Army no fewer than 10 times during the American Civil War, assuming the occupying force spent at least one night in the town. (Oral tradition and an erroneous state historical marker claim the town changed hands 56 times.) The story of the small town is emblematic of the many military campaigns that swept through western Virginia and, later, the new state of West Virginia.

== 1861 ==
- Union Col. Lewis "Lew" Wallace, in command of the 11th Indiana Zouaves, occupied Romney for a few hours on June 13.
- The next day, Col. Ambrose P. Hill's Confederates occupied the town.
- Confederate Col. John C. Vaughn of the 3rd Tennessee was apparently stationed in Romney, from which, under orders of A.P. Hill of the 13th Virginia Infantry, he attacked Federal forces at New Creek on June 18.
- Confederate Capt. Turner Ashby established the headquarters of the 7th Virginia Cavalry at "Camp Washington" on the George W. Washington farm, "Ridgedale," immediately north of Hanging Rocks and across the South Branch Potomac River from Wire Bridge.
- In July, Col. A. C. Cummings of Brig. Gen. Thomas J. Jackson's command that had fought at the First Battle of Manassas occupied Romney.
- In August, the Virginia Argus and Hampshire Advertiser weekly newspaper in Romney ceased publication after its closure by occupying Union Army forces.
- Confederate Col. Angus William McDonald was in command at Romney when it was attacked by Federals on September 23; McDonald had been advised by General Robert E. Lee on September 18 that the Federals were withdrawing from Romney. After feigning an attack through Mechanicsburg Gap, the Federals launched their main attack from Hanging Rock. On September 24, McDonald gave way before the stronger Federal force, but retook the town the next day as the disorganized enemy retreated across the South Branch bridge toward Keyser. Federal forces consisted of the 4th Ohio and 8th Ohio Infantry and some members of the Ringgold Cavalry under Capt. John Keys; Confederate forces were the 114th and 77th Virginia militia regiments.
- On October 24, Federal Ohio and Virginia infantry (with some light artillery and Ringgold Cavalry) attacked through Mechanicsburg Gap; on October 26 the Confederate defenders fled. There was a skirmish at Wire Bridge as part of this assault. It was as a result of this Federal success that Col. Benjamin F. Kelley issued his "Address to the People of Hampshire County and the Upper Potomac". For a time after this, Federals under the command of Col. Samuel H. Dunning of the 5th Ohio Infantry occupied Romney.

== 1862 ==
- On January 7, an advance guard of Confederates was defeated by about 2,000 Federals under Colonel Dunning at Blue's Gap.
- On January 10, Federal troops under Frederick W. Lander evacuated Romney and Confederate cavalry under the command of Captains George F. Sheetz and E. H. Shans occupied the town; Brig. Gen. William W. Loring was placed in command and "Stonewall" Jackson returned to Winchester. This set the stage for General Jackson's resignation, which was declined.
- On February 2 – 4 Confederate General Loring evacuated Romney.
- On February 7, after General Jackson had been forced to withdraw his units to Winchester, Federal forces under General Lander reoccupied the town and later broke up "the rebel nest at Bloomery Gap."
- Following apparent occupation by Confederates in the spring, Union Lt. Col. Stephen W. Downey of the 3rd Maryland Infantry, Potomac Home Brigade took command of Federal troops at Romney on March 3; in early May, Downey left his troops there and received a new command in Pendleton County.
- From April 24 – 28, the Federal Ringgold and Washington Cavalry were stationed in Romney.
- During early 1862, Blenker's Federal division marched through Romney.
- On June 13, the Federal Army occupies Romney after a brief skirmish with the Confederate Army.
- From September 13 – 15, Confederate Col. John D. Imboden occupied Romney for several days after a Federal withdrawal; he used the opportunity to set a successful ambush for Federal troops about two miles out of town.
- On October 2 the 1st New York Cavalry passed through Romney.
- On December 1 the Ringgold Cavalry skirmished with Confederates in Romney.
- Captain Keys of the Ringgold cavalry was reported to have left Romney on December 22 for Winchester.
- One week later, Brig. Gen. Robert H. Milroy and his cavalry escort passed through on his way to take command of Federal forces in Winchester.

== 1863 ==
- On January 6, Col. Jacob Campbell's 54th Pennsylvania Infantry Regiment moved to Romney in pursuit of Imboden.
- On January 8 (or 11), Col. James Washburn had been ordered by General Kelley to fall back to Romney with his entire Union force; by January 20, Washburn was in Romney with a force of about 1,400 men. Some remained until the middle of March.
- On April 7, Federals attacked Confederate partisan cavalry commander "Hanse" McNeill near Purgitsville, one day after his successful action at Burlington when he had captured Lt. William F. Speer and eleven of the Ringgold Cavalry's foraging party. Romney was securely in Federal hands at that time and remained so until the Confederates moved into the Shenandoah Valley as part of their second invasion of the North (the Gettysburg campaign). Campbell's 54th Pennsylvania Infantry participated in the pursuit and victory. The regiment remained in the Burlington area, scouting and capturing guerillas until June 30 when they moved to New Creek. The 54th would return to Romney in late July or early August after participating in the pursuit of the Confederate army's retreat after their defeat at Gettysburg.
- On June 7, General Lee commanded Imboden's cavalry to move against Romney in order "to attract the enemy's attention in Hampshire County." It is not clear exactly when Imboden took Romney again, for a Federal communication of June 13 implies that Romney was then being abandoned. Local tradition places Captain McNeill's Rangers in Romney around that time.
- On June 19, the Ringgold Cavalry moved through Romney in one day.
- On June 21, the Lafayette Cavalry came through Romney.
- On July 22, Confederate scouts were reported to be moving in the direction of Romney following the assignment of General Imboden to the Valley District. After the retreat from Gettysburg, Confederates occupied the Shenandoah and South Branch valleys for a month or two until the Federals began to move in the area in large numbers. During the following months, Romney may have changed hands several times without official record.
- On August 4, the Ringgold Cavalry again occupied the town. On August 6 or 7, General Kelley passed through Romney as he moved his headquarters from Hedgesville to New Creek.
- On November 6, Col. Jacob Campbell's 54th Pennsylvania Infantry Regiment left Romney.
- On November 16, Confederate Captain McNeill with 170 cavalry captured 25 prisoners, 80 wagons, and 255 horses near Burlington; this occurred during a time when General Lee felt that Romney, Petersburg, and Martinsburg were too strongly held for a direct Confederate attack. Lt. Col. John P. Linton and his Federals passed through Romney several times on his way to and from Springfield.

== 1864 ==
- On January 5, Fitzhugh Lee passed through Romney, which Maj. Harry Gilmor and Captain McNeill had occupied a few days before; following their departure, Capt. Henry A. Meyers occupied Romney on January 8. Later in the month it was yet again recaptured by Confederates.
- On February 3, a detachment of Thomas L. Rosser's unit (part of Jubal A. Early's command) entered Romney. In a complicated set of circumstances, Romney was occupied once or twice daily between February 1 and 3 inclusive. A detachment of the 8th New York Heavy Artillery was among the units involved.
- Sometime after the middle of March, Union cavalry moved through Romney.
- On May 10, Col. Jacob Higgins, commanding about 500 Federal cavalry, was surprised by detachments of Imboden's cavalry; he tried to rally his men "on the plains of Romney" but was pushed out of town. On May 11 Imboden departed.
- About two weeks later, the Ringgold Cavalry again passed through town on a scouting mission.
- About the middle of June, the Ringgolds passed through again.
- On June 26, part of the Union 6th West Virginia Volunteer Cavalry Regiment scouted Romney.
- On July 3, the 6th West Virginia Cavalry returned to Romney.
- On July 4, Confederates rang the Hampshire County Courthouse bell in Romney to announce the approach of Federal scouts. During most of the month of July, McNeill and Harness were in the vicinity of Romney.
- On July 10, Confederates again briefly occupied Romney.
- On July 14, McNeill was again in Romney.
- On July 20, the Federal 6th West Virginia Cavalry again was in town.
- On August 3, Confederate general John McCausland, returning from his raid on Chambersburg, occupied Romney for two days.
- On August 6, Confederate scouts stationed at Romney warned McCausland of an impending attack upon his forces by General Averell who came through Romney that day. Averell successfully attacked McCausland at Moorefield and took approximately 420 prisoners.
- August 9, the 6th West Virginia Cavalry came through Romney; they did again on August 14 and August 17.
- On August 28 McNeill was said to yet again be in Romney.
- On November 6, Union scouts passed through town.
- On November 26, members of the 6th West Virginia Cavalry camped in Romney.
- On December 25 scouts from 22nd Pennsylvania Cavalry passed through town.

== 1865 ==
- On February 5, Union cavalry passed through Romney.
- On February 21, the Confederate McNeill's Rangers, now under the command of Captain McNeill's son, lieutenant Jessee McNeill, passed through Romney going to and from Cumberland, where they carried out the daring kidnap of Generals George Crook and Benjamin Franklin Kelley.
- Maxwell and Swisher's History of Hampshire County states that Romney was held for the last time by Confederate forces on April 15, when parts of the companies line(?) and Harness were in the vicinity of Romney. Local tradition states that McNeill's Rangers surrendered at Sycamore Dale near the Romney bridge in May.
- Edward H. McDonald and George F. Sheetz (two members of the "Laurel Brigade") came through town, escaping from Virginia after General Lee's surrender at Appomattox Court House.

== 1866–1867 ==
- June 1, 1867: First decoration of Confederate graves in Indian Mound Cemetery.
- September 26, 1867: The Confederate Memorial was dedicated to Confederate dead at Indian Mound Cemetery in Romney.

== Civil War sites ==
- Boxwood residence (c. 1850), East Main Street
  - Boxwood was used as a hospital during the war. It is said that each of the 56 changes between the Northern and Southern armies took place under the great elm tree in the front yard.
- The Burg residence (c. 1769), US Route 50 at Mechanicsburg Gap
  - The Burg has been in the original family (Williams) for seven generations. It was used as a headquarters by both armies during the war.
- Davis History House (1798), West Main Street
  - The Davis House was home to the Davis family which sent two sons to fight for the Confederacy and one for the Union. Now a museum, it features Civil War artifacts and period furnishings.
- Confederate Memorial, Indian Mound Cemetery
- Fort Mill Ridge Civil War Trenches, US Route 50
- Hampshire County Courthouse, Main and High Streets
- Hanging Rocks, WV Route 28
- Indian Mound Cemetery, West Main Street
- Liberty Hall residence (1858), West Main Street
  - Traditionally referred to as Thomas "Stonewall" Jackson's headquarters, the house and grounds were used by both Union and Confederate troops at various times during the Civil War. It was built in 1858 by John Baker White, clerk of the circuit and superior court in Hampshire County, who fled to Richmond to escape arrest and served in the Treasury Department of the Confederacy.
- Literary Hall, Main and High Streets
- Romney Presbyterian Church (1860), 100 West Rosemary Lane
  - The Presbyterian church was used as a hospital and stable during the Civil War.
- Sycamore Dale residence (1836), South Branch River Road (CR 8)
  - Referred to in the General Lew Wallace raid of June 12, 1861, Sycamore Dale was built by David Gibson in 1836. The house is listed on the National Register of Historic Places. Wallace wrote a portion of Ben-Hur: A Tale of the Christ here.
- Taggart Hall (c. 1790s), Gravel Lane and High Street
  - Taggart Hall is currently the headquarters for the Fort Mill Ridge Foundation Museum & Exhibit Center.
- Valley View residence (1855), Depot Valley Road
- Washington Bottom Farm residence (1835), Washington Road (CR 28/3)
- Wirgman Building (c. 1825), East Main Street (demolished)

== See also ==
- Romney Expedition
- West Virginia in the American Civil War
- Winchester in the Civil War
