= Marshall McDonald =

American scientist (1835–1895)

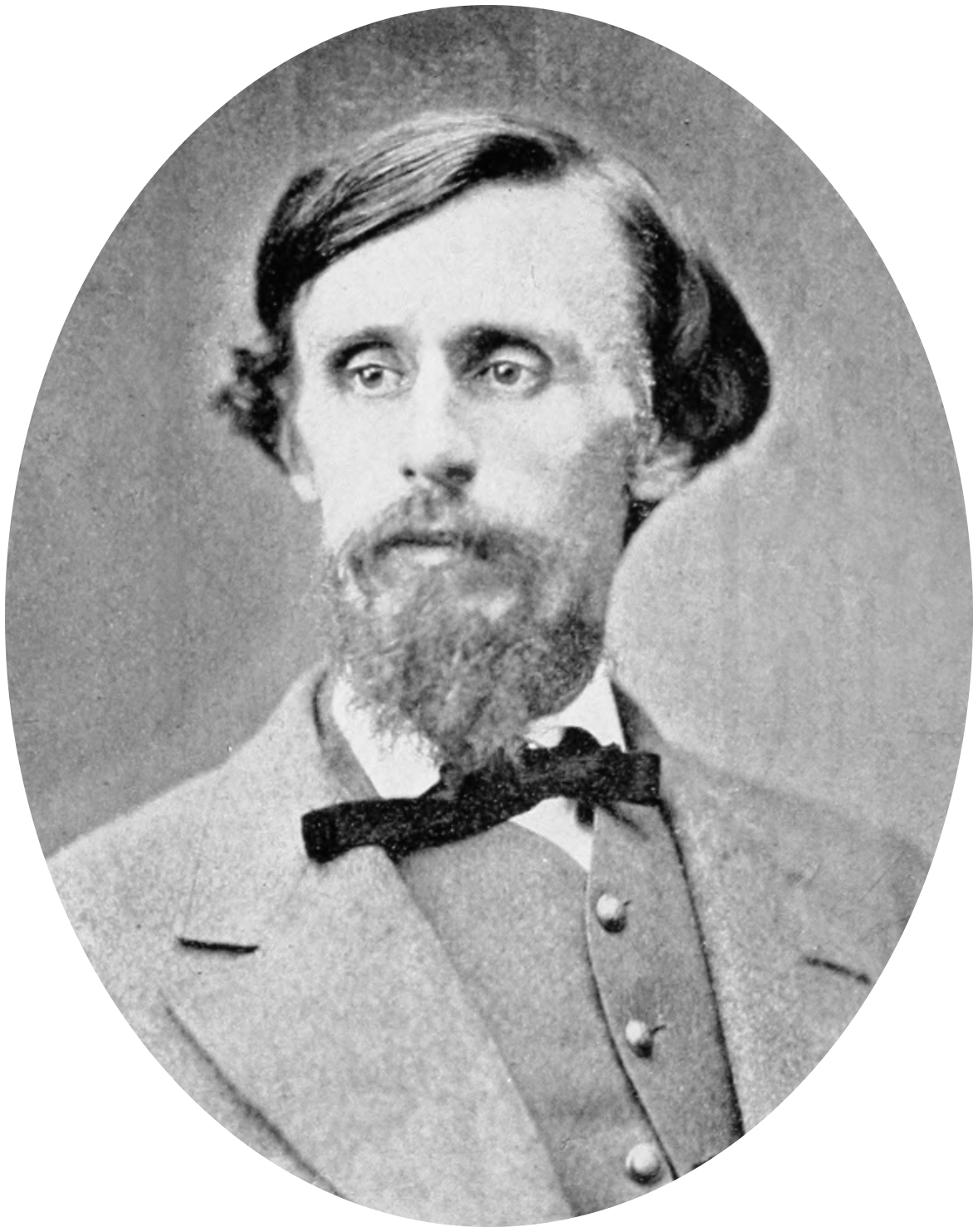
- Portrait of Marshall McDonald

United States Commissioner of Fish and Fisheries
- In office 1888–1895
- President: Grover Cleveland; Benjamin Harrison
- Preceded by: George Brown Goode
- Succeeded by: John J. Brice

Chief Assistant Commissioner of the United States Commission of Fish and Fisheries
- In office 1885–1888

Personal details
- Born: October 18, 1835 Romney, Virginia, U.S.
- Died: September 1, 1895 (aged 59) Washington, D.C., U.S.
- Resting place: Oak Hill Cemetery, Georgetown, Washington, D.C.
- Spouse: Mary Eliza McCormick
- Relations: Angus McDonald (great-grandfather); Angus McDonald (grandfather); Angus William McDonald (father); Edward Allen Hitchcock McDonald (brother)
- Children: 4
- Parent(s): Angus William McDonald; Leacy Anne Naylor
- Education: University of Virginia; Virginia Military Institute
- Occupation: Engineer, professor, geologist, mineralogist, pisciculturist, and fisheries scientist

Military service
- Allegiance: Confederate States of America
- Branch/service: Confederate States Army
- Years of service: 1861–1865
- Rank: Colonel
- Battles/wars: American Civil War

Marshall McDonald (October 18, 1835 – September 1, 1895) was an American engineer, geologist, mineralogist, pisciculturist, and fisheries scientist. McDonald served as the commissioner of the United States Commission of Fish and Fisheries from 1888 until his death in 1895. He is best known for his inventions of a number of fish hatching apparatuses and a fish ladder that enabled salmon and other migrating fish species to ascend the rapids of watercourses resulting in an increased spawning ground. McDonald's administration of the U.S. Commission of Fish and Fisheries was notably free of scandal and furthered the "protection and culture" of fish species throughout the United States.

Born in 1835 in Romney, Virginia (present-day West Virginia), McDonald was the son of Angus William McDonald, a military officer and lawyer, and his wife, Leacy Anne Naylor. From 1854 to 1855, McDonald studied natural history under Spencer Fullerton Baird at the Smithsonian Institution in Washington, D.C. He then attended the University of Virginia and Virginia Military Institute, from which he graduated in 1860. McDonald served as an assistant professor of chemistry at the institute under Stonewall Jackson and continued to teach intermittently throughout the American Civil War.

McDonald joined the Confederate States Army in 1861 and was commissioned as a lieutenant and engineer officer. He served as an inspector general on Stonewall Jackson's staff, then served as staff officer for Major General Martin Luther Smith and as an engineer officer for Lieutenant General John C. Pemberton. McDonald was taken as a prisoner of war by the Union Army at Vicksburg, Mississippi, in 1863. Following the war in 1865, McDonald returned to the Virginia Military Institute where he was appointed a professor with the rank of colonel, instructing and serving as chair of the subjects of chemistry, geology, mineralogy, and metallurgy. He also established the institution's first museum.

By 1875, McDonald was involved in fish farming and became the administrator of the Virginia state fish hatchery at Wytheville. He was appointed as the Fish Commissioner of Virginia and invented the fish ladder during his tenure. In 1879, Spencer Fullerton Baird hired McDonald for a position at the U.S. Commission of Fish and Fisheries. There, he served as a special agent, superintendent of the shad hatcheries, Chief of the Division of Fish Culture, and Chief Assistant Commissioner of the Fish Commission. In 1888, President Grover Cleveland appointed McDonald as the Commissioner of Fish and Fisheries. McDonald died in office in 1895.

== Early life and education ==
McDonald was born on October 18, 1835, to Angus William McDonald and his wife, Leacy Anne Naylor, in Romney, Hampshire County, Virginia (now West Virginia). McDonald was the sixth child and fourth son. He was named for the Marshall family, many of whom were friends of his father. The McDonald's raised nine children—five sons and four daughters—in a log dwelling in Romney owned by Leacy Anne's father, William Naylor. The structure, currently known as the Davis History House, remains standing on its original site at the corner of Main and Bolton Streets and serves as a museum maintained by the Hampshire County Public Library. McDonald's father was a prominent community leader in Romney and served on the board of trustees of Romney Academy, an academy that McDonald likely attended, and its successor institution, the Romney Classical Institute. Following the death of McDonald's mother Leacy Anne, his father sold the Naylor family's log dwelling in 1849 and moved to Hannibal, Missouri, in the 1850s only to return to Virginia a few years later upon marrying his second wife, Cornelia Peake. McDonald, his father, and his siblings were still residing in Romney at the time of the 1850 United States census. It is not known whether McDonald and his siblings accompanied their father on his temporary move to Missouri.

== Education and early academic career ==
From 1854 to 1855, McDonald studied natural history under Spencer Fullerton Baird at the Smithsonian Institution in Washington, D.C. McDonald entered the third class of the Virginia Military Institute in Lexington, Virginia, in 1855, where Thomas "Stonewall" Jackson was one of his professors. During the 1858–1859 academic year, McDonald attended the University of Virginia in Charlottesville. He resumed his studies at the Virginia Military Institute graduating in July 1860. McDonald served as an assistant professor in chemistry under Jackson at the Virginia Military Institute from fall 1860 until the outbreak of the American Civil War in April 1861, and taught intermittently throughout the course of the war.

== Military career in the American Civil War ==
McDonald joined the Confederate States Army on April 27, 1861, and was commissioned as a lieutenant and engineer officer. He then served as inspector general on the staff of his former professor, Lieutenant General Stonewall Jackson. McDonald later served as a staff officer for Major General Martin Luther Smith and as an engineer officer for Lieutenant General John C. Pemberton after being transferred to New Orleans.

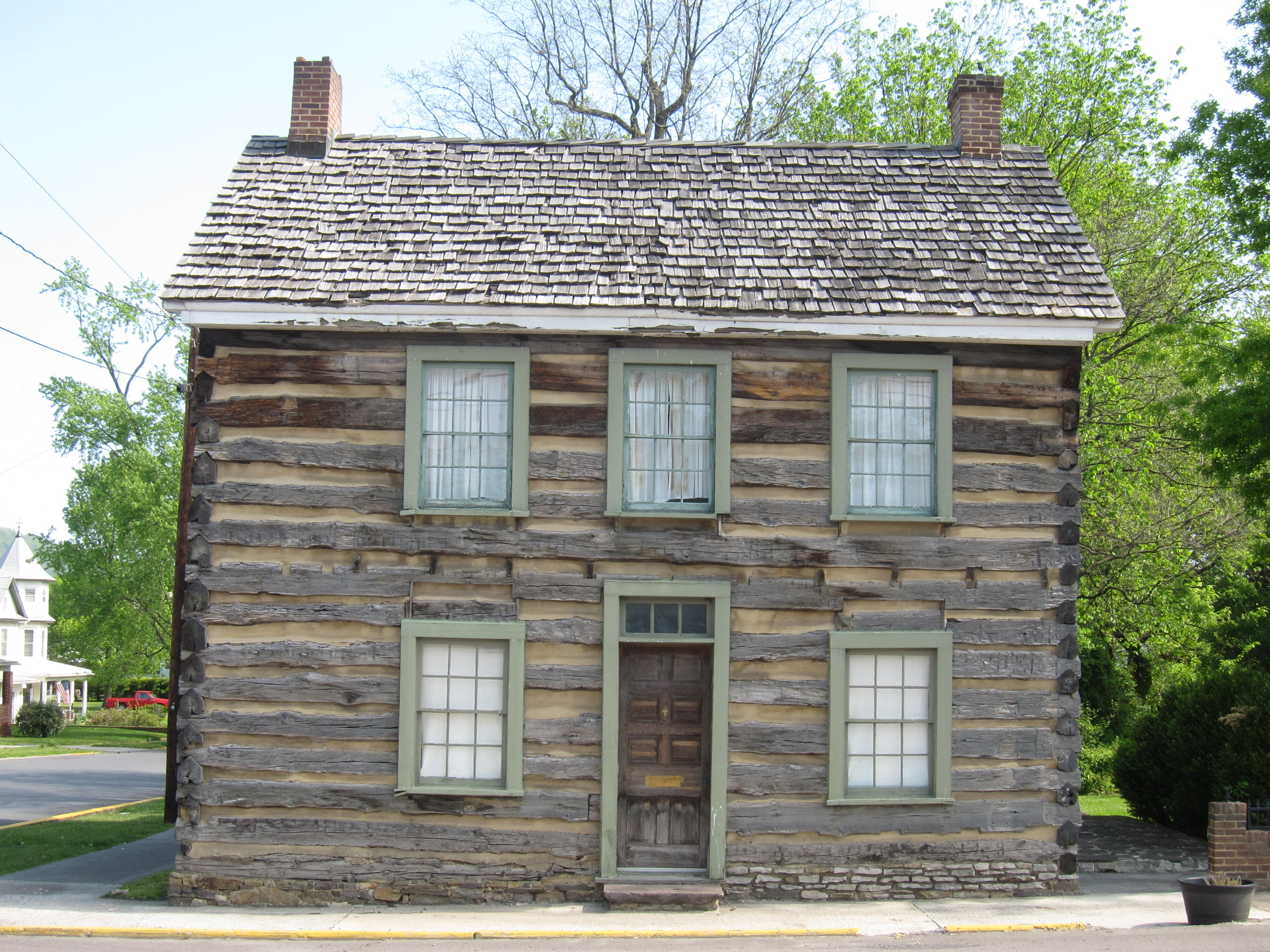
McDonald was raised (and likely born) in this log dwelling in Romney, Virginia (now West Virginia). Known as the Davis History House, McDonald's childhood home serves as an American Civil War museum maintained by the Hampshire County Public Library.

While he was serving as chief engineer under Pemberton, the Union Army took McDonald as a prisoner of war at Vicksburg, Mississippi, in 1863. During the war, McDonald and other former cadets returned to the Virginia Military Institute to instruct pupils while on parole or recuperating from injuries. In 1864, while McDonald was on parole, one of his students, John Sergeant Wise, recounted having McDonald as a professor: "Marshall McDonald hobbles in to point with his crutch at the problems on the black-board, until he can once more point with his sword towards 'the looming bastion fringed with fire'." Of the professors at the institute during the war, Wise remarked, "they taught with a zest and freshness as we seldom see".

McDonald was promoted to the rank of major in command of engineers on the staff of General Braxton Bragg. By the end of the war, he had been promoted to the ranks of colonel and brigadier general. While serving as an officer in an engineer corps, McDonald saw "much active service". McDonald and his four brothers served with distinction in the Confederate States Army, but only three of his brothers survived the war. His father was one of the first Hampshire County residents to volunteer to fight for the Confederacy in 1861 and was commissioned as a colonel in command of the 7th Virginia Cavalry Regiment.

== Return to Virginia Military Institute ==
Following the war in 1865, McDonald returned to the Virginia Military Institute where he was appointed a professor with the rank of colonel. He served as both instructor and chair of chemistry, geology, mineralogy, and metallurgy. During his tenure, McDonald established the institution's first museum. During the 1867–1868 academic year, McDonald's chair was further subdivided as new lecture halls were being completed within the restored barracks; he retained the subjects of mineralogy, geology, and metallurgy. His colleagues among the faculty included Superintendent Francis Henney Smith and professors Matthew Fontaine Maury, Scott Shipp, John Mercer Brooke, and George Washington Custis Lee. Toward the end of his tenure at the Virginia Military Institute, McDonald occupied the chair of geology and mining engineering.

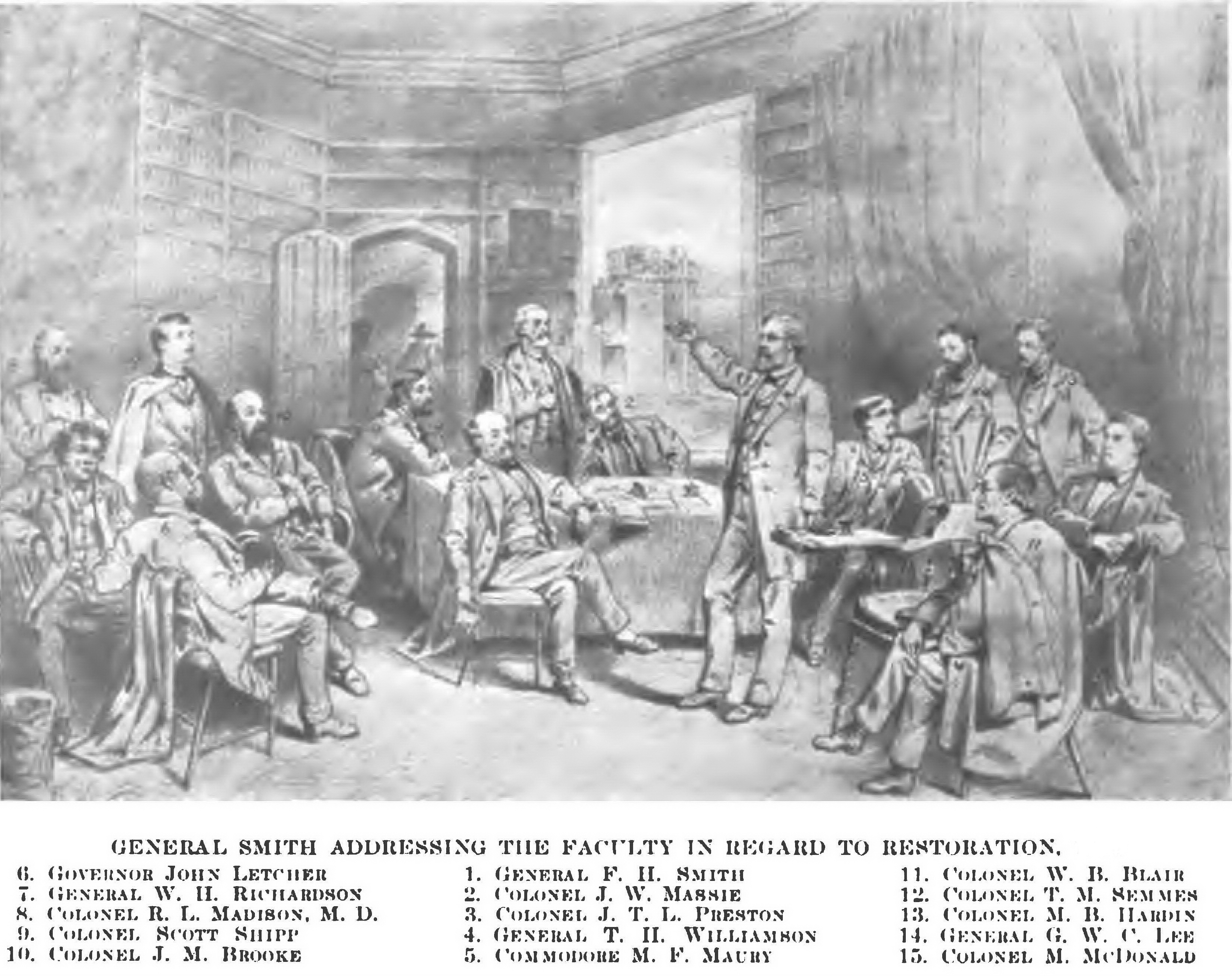
An illustration of General Francis Henney Smith addressing the faculty of the Virginia Military Institute, including McDonald, about the institution's restoration following the American Civil War.

In 1875, McDonald was involved in fish farming and became the administrator of the Virginia state fish hatchery at Wytheville. He was appointed as the sole Fish Commissioner of Virginia shortly thereafter. It was during his tenure in this position that McDonald invented the fish ladder that was named for him. This ladder enabled salmon and other migrating fish species to ascend the rapids of watercourses, thus increasing the extent of their spawning grounds. In 1877, Virginia commissioned McDonald to conduct a survey of mineral resources within the James River basin, and to report his findings to the Virginia General Assembly in 1879. McDonald continued to instruct at the Virginia Military Institute until 1879, when Spencer Fullerton Baird offered him a position with the United States Commission of Fish and Fisheries. McDonald accepted, and submitted his resignation from the Virginia commission to Governor Fitzhugh Lee.

== United States Fish Commission ==
McDonald was appointed to an assistant's position within the United States Fish Commission, where he was a special agent under Baird, responsible for compiling and publishing fishery statistics related to the 1880 United States census. Following the census, he served as superintendent of the shad hatcheries on the Potomac River. During his subsequent years at the Fish Commission, McDonald was responsible for the distribution of "young fishes" and of "food-fishes" to state fisheries, and later served as chief of the Division of Fish Culture. In 1885, McDonald was appointed Chief Assistant Commissioner of the Fish Commission. He continued in that capacity until January 1888 when President Grover Cleveland appointed him to replace Dr. George Brown Goode as the Commissioner of Fish and Fisheries. Brown had been filling the position temporarily following Baird's death. McDonald took his oath of office on February 18, 1888. His appointment was widely recognized as an "excellent" choice because of the breadth of his experience, his organizational and leadership abilities, and his sense of duty and responsibility to the American people. According to William A. Bruette in Field and Stream, McDonald was one of the most accomplished fish culturists in the United States at the time of his appointment. As Fish Commissioner, McDonald was initially paid $5,000 per annum and had at his disposal three yachts and 22 fishing stations to conduct research and carry out the commission's efforts.

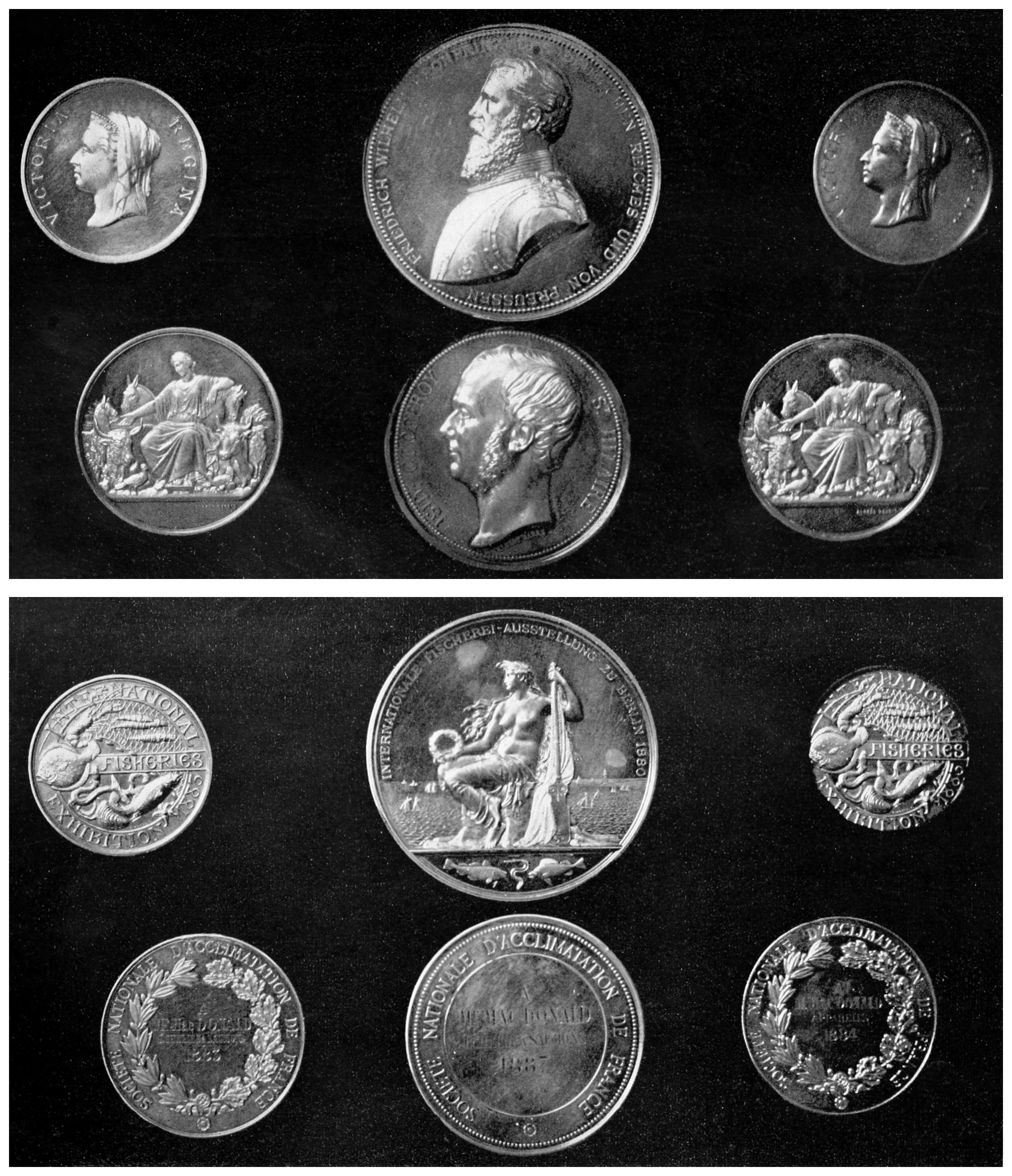
McDonald was awarded medals (pictured) at international fishery exhibitions in Berlin and London, and from the Société d'Acclimation in Paris for his inventions and improvements in fish farming.

As Fish Commissioner, one of McDonald's most important works was his plan to undertake a biological and physical survey of American fisheries and fish culture more thorough than any previously undertaken. McDonald believed the first step toward building "a comprehensive knowledge of the conditions of greatest productiveness" of American fisheries was to understand the primary food supply of fish, which he termed "aquatic pastorage". He initiated controversial changes at the Fish Commission, imposing a bureaucratic structure inspired by his previous military career and solidifying the commission's focus on fish culture.

In 1893, McDonald warned Oregon's Governor Sylvester Pennoyer of "the disastrous outlook for the future of the salmon fisheries of the Columbia".

=== Fish hatching innovations ===
Throughout his tenure at the Fish Commission, McDonald designed and invented several innovative fish hatching apparatuses and appliances. In 1871, McDonald devised automatic hatching jars which revolutionized the field of fish farming and were widely utilized by the United States Fish Commission, several state commissions, and commissions in Europe and Japan. The hatching jar apparatus enabled a "vast extension" of the propagation of shad accomplished in the 1880s and 1890s and rendered the work of the Fish Commission commercially successful. Automatic hatching jars enabled fish culturists to separate dead eggs from the live ones for hatching. In 1880, he designed a cod box that produced the tidal motion necessary for the hatching of floating eggs. McDonald perfected his design of the cod box in 1888. In the winter of 1883, McDonald developed a tidal apparatus for hatching floating halibut eggs and those of other marine species. The vast production and distribution of fish eggs by the Fish Commission was made possible through the utilization of this tidal apparatus. Its use made the process of hatching eggs cheaper and increased the commission's fish farming output capacity.

=== Awards and honors ===
Early in his career at the Fish Commission, McDonald was awarded gold medals and diplomas from international fishery exhibitions in Berlin and London, and a silver medal from the Société d'Acclimation in Paris for his inventions and improvements in the field of fish farming. He also received a "special medal" from the Société d'Acclimation for a fish ladder he devised for the River Vienne in southwestern France.

== Later life and death ==
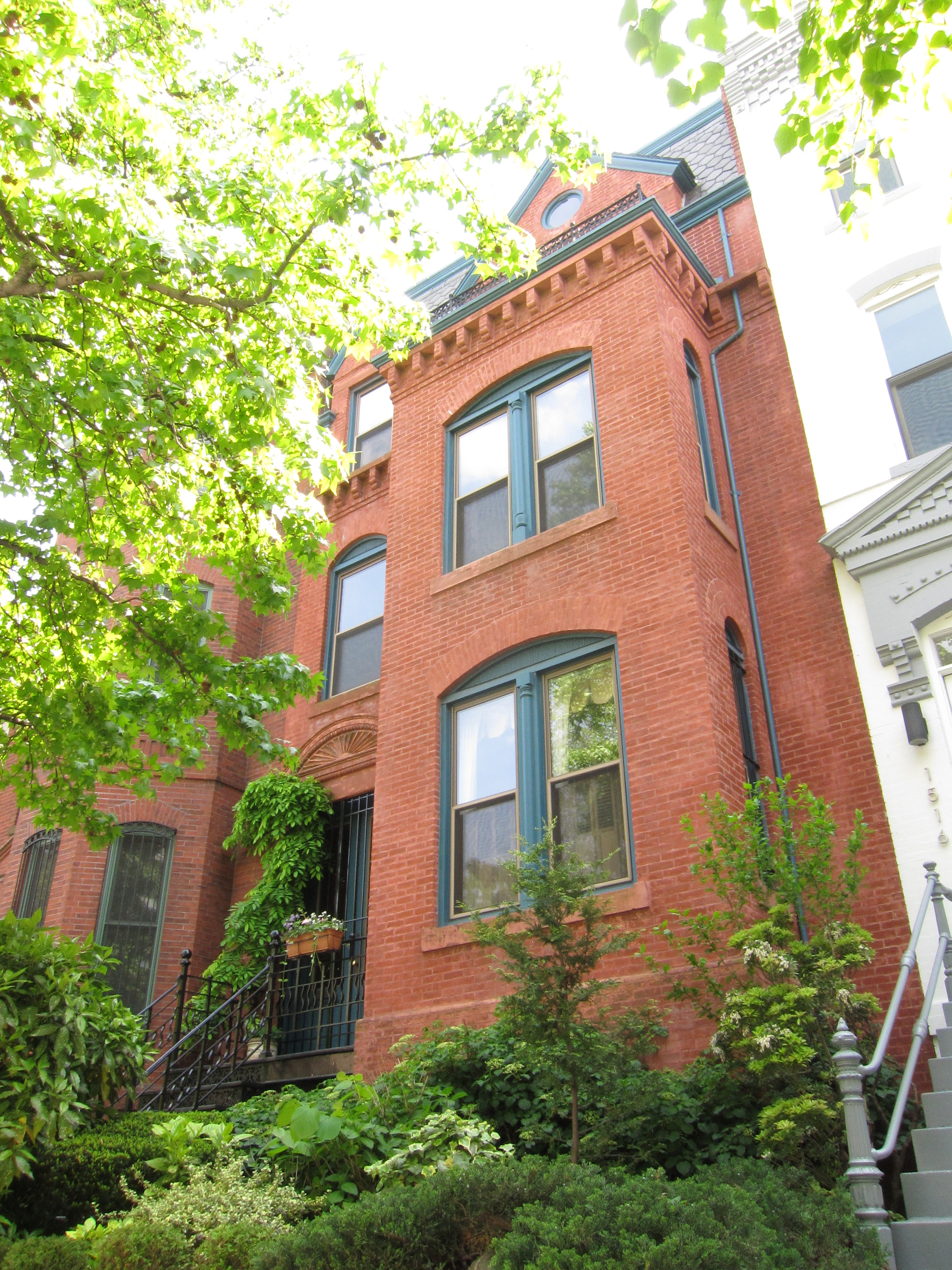
McDonald's row house at 1514 R Street, Northwest in the Logan Circle neighborhood of Washington, D.C. where he resided until his death in 1895.

By 1890, McDonald was residing at 1514 R Street, Northwest in what is now known as the Logan Circle neighborhood of Washington, D.C. After suffering from tuberculosis for several months, He traveled to the Adirondack Mountains with his wife in the early summer of 1895 seeking to benefit from the region's "health-giving air". His condition deteriorated, and he returned to his residence in Washington, D.C. where he died the following week on Sunday morning, September 1, 1895. McDonald was interred on September 3 next to his daughter Nannie in Lot 432 East at Oak Hill Cemetery in Washington's Georgetown neighborhood.

== Legacy ==
In his Forest and Stream magazine following McDonald's death in 1895, Charles Hallock recounted "the record of [McDonald's] administration is an honorable one. By the death of Commissioner McDonald the country loses a public officer who has served faithfully honestly and well." He added, "The closing of his life is a loss to fish culture and to the public interests." Marcus Benjamin, in his remembrance of McDonald for the District of Columbia Sons of the American Revolution, remarked: "His articles and reports on the fishing industries of the world are of great interest and his efforts in behalf of the oyster have resulted in much good." Benjamin further stated, "McDonald's bearing was always kind and generous to a fault, and his tread and manner carried for him a remembrance of his long line of military ancestry."

== Personal life ==
=== Marriage and family ===
McDonald married Mary Eliza McCormick (October 18, 1840 – February 8, 1934), daughter of Colonel Francis McCormick and his wife Rose Mortimer Ellzey, on December 17, 1867 at her family's estate "Frankford" near Berryville in Clarke County, Virginia. Mary was born on October 18, 1840, at "Weehaw" in Clarke County and was educated at Richmond Seminary. McDonald and his wife had four children, two of whom survived to adulthood:

- Mary McDonald (born and died March 1869, Lexington, Virginia)
- Rose Mortimer Ellzey McDonald Skoggs (November 23, 1871, Lexington, Virginia – 1953, Berryville, Virginia)
- Angus McDonald (May 28, 1873, Lexington, Virginia – January 17, 1905, Milner, Idaho)
- Nannie Frank McDonald (January 17, 1883, Washington, D.C. – April 10, 1886, Washington, D.C.)

=== Religious affiliation ===
McDonald was a member of the Protestant Episcopal Church and served as a vestryman at Lee Chapel, which he was partly instrumental in building.

=== Genealogy ===
In 1890, McDonald applied for and acquired membership in the National Society of the Sons of the American Revolution through the organization's District of Columbia branch. He qualified for membership through his direct male-line great-grandfather, Colonel Angus McDonald, who served in the French and Indian War, Dunmore's War, and the American Revolutionary War after immigrating to the Thirteen Colonies from Inverness, Scotland, following his banishment after the Battle of Culloden. General George Washington appointed Colonel Angus McDonald to serve as a lieutenant colonel in command of Virginia revolutionary forces. He also served on various revolutionary committees throughout the war. McDonald also qualified for membership through his descent from his great-grandfather, William Sanford of Hampshire County, Virginia, and through his great-great-grandfather, William McGuire of Frederick County, Virginia, both of whom served as commissioned officers in Virginia revolutionary forces. He was formally elected to the society on January 27, 1890.

== Publications ==
- Semi-annual Report of the Superintendent of the Virginia Military Institute: Enclosing the Report of a Geological and Mineral Examination of a Portion of the James River Iron-belt. R.E. Frayser, Superintendent Public Printer. 1879.
- Report of Operations at the Wytheville Station, Virginia, from January 1, 1885 to June 30, 1887. Washington, D.C.: United States Government Printing Office. 1889.
- Bulletin of the United States Fish Commission, Volume XIV, for 1894. Washington, D.C.: United States Government Printing Office. 1895.

== Bibliography ==
- Benjamin, Marcus; National Society of the Sons of the American Revolution, District of Columbia Society (1897). Report of the Historian of the District of Columbia Society of the Sons of the American Revolution for the Years 1895 and 1896. Law Reporter Company. Archived from the original on October 31, 2013 – via Google Books.
- Blume, Kenneth J. (2011). Historical Dictionary of the U.S. Maritime Industry. Scarecrow Press. ISBN 978-0-8108-5634-9. OCLC 741415839. Archived from the original on November 13, 2013 – via Google Books.
- Bowers, George M.; United States Bureau of Fisheries (1902). Report of the Commissioner - United States Commission of Fish and Fisheries, Volume 27. United States Government Printing Office. Archived from the original on October 9, 2013 – via Google Books.
- Bruette, William A. (1895). Charles Hallock (ed.). Forest and Stream, Volume 45. Forest and Stream Publishing Company. Archived from the original on October 9, 2013 – via Google Books.
- Chautauqua Literary and Scientific Circle; Chautauqua Institution (1896). The Chautauquan, Volume 22. M. Bailey. Archived from the original on October 31, 2013 – via Google Books.
- Couper, William (1952). History of the Shenandoah Valley, Volume 3. New York City, New York: Lewis Historical Publishing Company. Archived from the original on October 9, 2013 – via Google Books.
- Davis, Jefferson; Lynda Lasswell Crist (1992). Mary Seaton Dix (ed.). The Papers of Jefferson Davis: 1861, Volume 7. Baton Rouge, Louisiana: Louisiana State University Press. ISBN 978-0-8071-1726-2. Archived from the original on November 2, 2013 – via Google Books.
- Leslie, Frank (1888). John Albert Sleicher (ed.). Leslie's, Volumes 65-67. Frank Leslie. Archived from the original on October 9, 2013 – via Google Books.
- McDonald, Marshall (1883). "History of the Experiments Leading to the Development of the Automatic Fish-Hatching Jar". Transactions of the American Fish-Cultural Association. 12. New York: American Fish-Cultural Association: 34–46. doi:10.1577/1548-8659(1883)13[34:HOTELT]2.0.CO;2 – via Internet Archive.
- McIlhany, Hugh Milton (1903). Some Virginia Families: Being Genealogies of the Kinney, Stribling, Trout, McIlhany, Milton, Rogers, Tate, Snickers, Taylor, McCormick, and Other Families of Virginia. Stoneburner & Prufer, printers – via Internet Archive.
- Moore, John Percy; American Society of Naturalists (1895). The American Naturalist, Volume 29. University of Chicago Press – via Internet Archive.
- Morrison, Alfred James; Virginia State Board of Education (1917). The Beginnings of Public Education in Virginia, 1776–1860: Study of Secondary Schools in Relation to the State Literary Fund, Volume 187. D. Bottom, Superintendent of Public Printing. Archived from the original on January 4, 2014 – via Internet Archive.
- Munske, Roberta R.; Kerns, Wilmer L., eds. (2004). Hampshire County, West Virginia, 1754–2004. Romney, West Virginia: The Hampshire County 250th Anniversary Committee. ISBN 978-0-9715738-2-6. OCLC 55983178.
- Smith, Francis Henney (1890). Virginia Military Institute—Building and Rebuilding. Lexington, Virginia: Virginia Military Institute. Archived from the original on December 3, 2015.
- Taylor, Joseph E. (2001). Making Salmon: An Environmental History of the Northwest Fisheries Crisis. Seattle, Washington: University of Washington Press. ISBN 978-0-295-98114-7. Archived from the original on October 9, 2013 – via Google Books.
- Virginia General Assembly (1839). Acts passed at a General Assembly of the Commonwealth of Virginia. Virginia General Assembly. Archived from the original on January 4, 2014 – via Google Books.
- Virginia Military Institute (1869). Register of the Officers and Cadets of the Virginia Military Institute: Lexington, Va. 1869. Virginia Military Institute. Archived from the original on November 2, 2013 – via Google Books.
- Williams, Flora McDonald (1911). The Glengarry McDonalds of Virginia. Louisville, Kentucky: George G. Fetter Company – via Internet Archive.
- Wise, John Sergeant; Virginia Military Institute (1882). Battle of New Market, Va., May 15th, 1864: An Address Repeated by John S. Wise, Esq., a Cadet in the Corps of 1864, Before the Professors, Officers and Cadets of the Virginia Military Institute, in the Hall of the Dialectic Society, May 13th, 1882, Volume 150. Archived from the original on October 29, 2013 – via Google Books.

Political offices
Preceded by George Brown Goode	United States Commissioner of Fish and Fisheries; 1888 – 1895	Succeeded by John J. Brice
