= Angus McDonald (United States Army major) =

- Born: December 30, 1769 "Glengarry" near Winchester, Colony of Virginia
- Died: October 14, 1814 (aged 44); Batavia, New York, United States
- Spouse: Mary McGuire
- Relatives: Mary McGuire (spouse); Angus McDonald (father); Angus William McDonald (son); Marshall McDonald (grandson)
- Military career
- Allegiance: United States
- Branch: United States Army
- Rank: Major
- Unit: 12th Infantry Regiment
- Conflicts: War of 1812
- Other work: Military officer, landowner, and planter

Angus McDonald (December 30, 1769 – October 14, 1814) was an American military officer, landowner, and planter in the U.S. state of Virginia. McDonald served as a military officer during the War of 1812 following his appointment by United States President James Madison. McDonald was the son of Virginia military officer and frontiersman Colonel Angus McDonald and the father of Colonel Angus William McDonald, a commander in the Confederate States Army during the American Civil War.

== Early life ==
Angus McDonald was born on December 30, 1769, at "Glengarry" near Winchester, Frederick County in the Colony of Virginia. He was the third child and second-eldest son of prominent Virginia militiaman, frontiersman, and landowner Angus McDonald and his wife, Anna Thompson McDonald. McDonald was of Scottish descent through his father, and of English and Dutch descent through his mother. McDonald was raised on his father's plantation, "Glengarry", and upon reaching adulthood, he resided on his own farm which was in close proximity to "Glengarry". Even though McDonald was primarily a farmer, he engaged in a number of other business and leisure pursuits. Following his father's sudden death in 1778, McDonald received "Glengarry" which consisted of 466 acres (1.89 km^{2}) in addition to two houses and lots in Winchester. McDonald and his brother John also received 2,000 acres (8.1 km^{2}) in Kentucky to be divided between them.

== Marriage and children ==
McDonald married Mary McGuire (died 1809), daughter of Edward McGuire and his wife Millicent D'Obee, on January 11, 1798. Mary McGuire's maternal grandfather was French architect Samuel D'Obee, charged by Thomas Jefferson with supervising the construction of the Virginia State Capitol in Richmond. McDonald and his wife had three children, two sons and one daughter:

- Angus William McDonald (February 14, 1799, Winchester, Virginia – December 1, 1864, Richmond, Virginia), married first to Leacy Anne Naylor on January 11, 1827, second to Cornelia Peake on May 27, 1847
- Millicent McDonald, married first to William Sherrard, second to Richard Holliday
- Edward Charles McDonald (July 26, 1803 – 1862), married first to Frances Elizabeth Singleton in 1833, second to Susan Peake in 1842

McDonald named his eldest son, Angus William, in honor of his father Angus McDonald and his brother-in-law William McGuire. His daughter Millicent was named for McDonald's mother-in-law Millicent D'Obee McGuire, and his youngest son Edward Charles was named for Charles Edward Stuart, leader of the Jacobite rising of 1745 in which McDonald's father had served under Stuart's command. In March 1809, McDonald's wife Mary died and she was interred beside her father, Edward McGuire, in the Old Catholic Churchyard in Winchester. Following her death, McDonald's children were sent to "Glengarry" to be raised by his mother, Anna Thompson McDonald.

== Military career ==
During the onset of the War of 1812, McDonald was commissioned as a first lieutenant on March 12, 1812, in the 12th Infantry Regiment of the Regular Army. On June 24, 1814, McDonald received a commission to the rank of captain in the 12th Infantry Regiment following a nomination and appointment by United States President James Madison on February 1 of that year. McDonald was subsequently promoted to the rank of major in 1814.

On October 14, 1814, McDonald died in a military hospital in Batavia, New York from health complications caused by a "very long and trying" forced march. McDonald's final messages along with his belongings, which included his sword and sash, were delivered to his mother and children at "Glengarry" by his colleague and friend, Colonel John Strother, who had been present at McDonald's death. The McDonald family was very grateful to Strother for his actions and the two families remained close. Fifty years later, during the American Civil War, McDonald's son Colonel Angus William McDonald interceded on Strother's behalf when he was arrested by McDonald's Confederate squad for treason in August 1861. McDonald said of Strother, "he had been kind to my father, was his fellow soldier, tended him on his death-bed and was kind to me as his son. I never forgot it and I was never ungrateful."

McDonald's mother continued to raise McDonald's three children at "Glengarry" following his death.

== Bibliography ==
- Bond, Octavia Zollicoffer (1928). The Family Chronicle and Kinship book of Maclin, Clack, Cocke, Carter, Taylor, Cross, Gordon, and Other Related American Lineages. McDaniel Printing Company.
- Brannon, Selden W., ed. (1976). Historic Hampshire: A Symposium of Hampshire County and Its People, Past and Present. Parsons, West Virginia: McClain Printing Company. ISBN 978-0-87012-236-1. OCLC 3121468.
- Gardner, Charles Kitchell (1853). A Dictionary of All Officers: Who Have Been Commissioned, or Have Been Appointed and Served, in the Army of the United States, Since the Inauguration of Their First President in 1789, to the First January, 1853... G. P. Putnam and Company.
- Inscoe, John C.; Kenzer, Robert C. (2004). Enemies of the Country: New Perspectives on Unionists in the Civil War South. University of Georgia Press. ISBN 0820326607.
- Miller, Thomas Condit; Maxwell, Hu (1913). West Virginia and Its People, Volume 2. New York City, New York: Lewis Historical Publishing Company.
- United States Senate (1828). Journal of the Executive Proceedings of the Senate of the United States of America, Volume 2. United States Senate, Duff Green.
- West Virginia Department of Archives and History (1976). West Virginia History, Volume 38. West Virginia Department of Archives and History.
- Williams, Flora McDonald (1911). The Glengarry McDonalds of Virginia. Louisville, Kentucky: George G. Fetter Company.
