= Angus McDonald (Virginia militiaman) =

Scottish American Military officer, frontiersman, sheriff, landowner

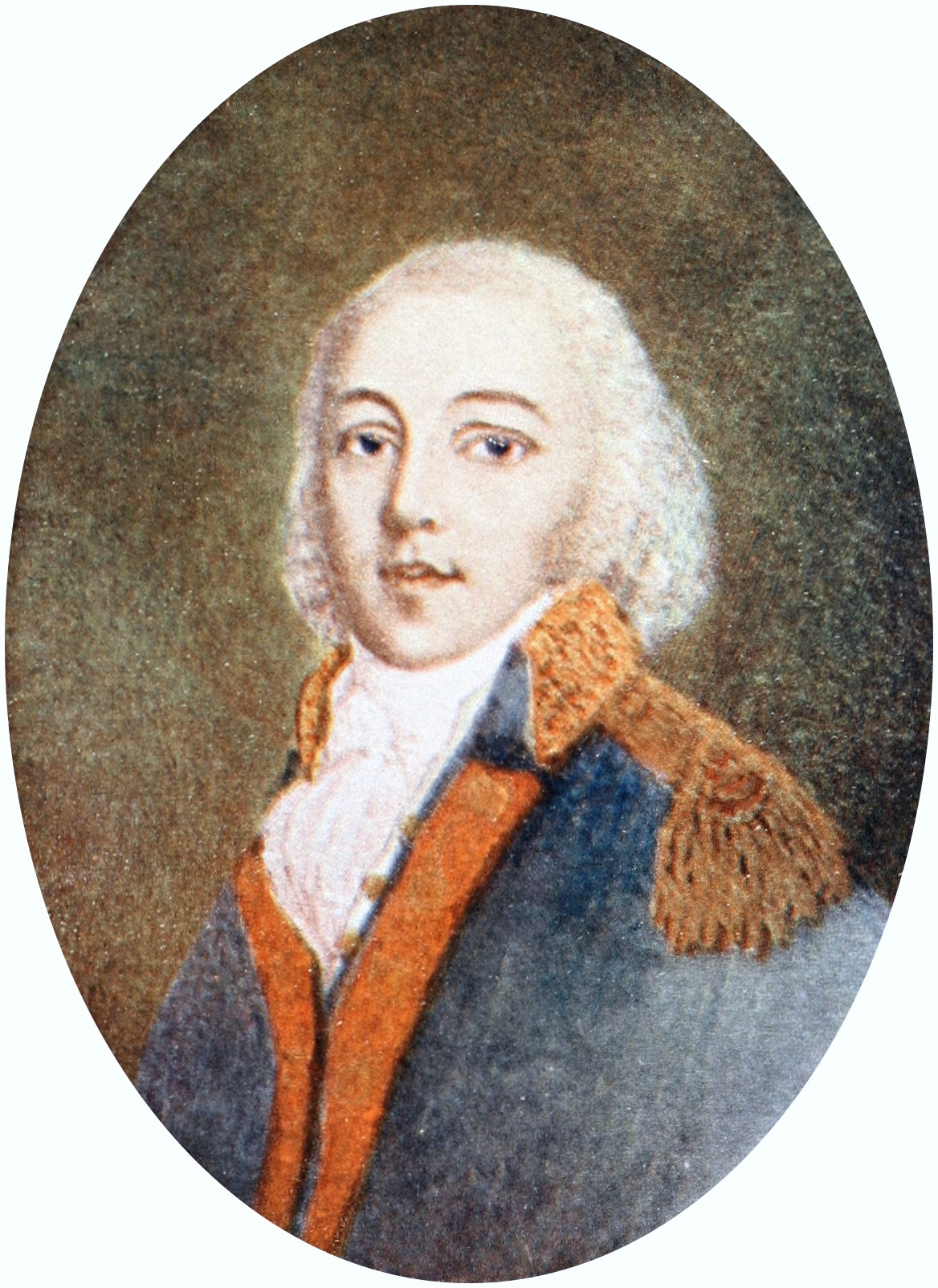
- Portrait of Angus McDonald
- Born: 1727; Scottish Highlands, Scotland, Kingdom of Great Britain
- Died: August 19, 1778 (aged 50–51) "Glengarry" near Winchester, Virginia, United States
- Spouse: Anna Thompson
- Relatives: Anna Thompson (spouse); Angus McDonald (son); Angus William McDonald (grandson); Marshall McDonald (great-grandson)
- Military career
- Allegiance: Jacobites; Kingdom of Great Britain; United States
- Branch: Virginia provincial militia
- Service years: 1745–1746 (Jacobites); 1746–1776 (Great Britain); 1776–1778 (United States)
- Rank: Lieutenant colonel
- Conflicts: Jacobite rising of 1745; French and Indian War; Dunmore's War; American Revolutionary War
- Other work: Military officer, frontiersman, sheriff, landowner

Angus McDonald (1727 – August 19, 1778) was a Scottish American military officer, frontiersman, sheriff and landowner in Virginia.

During the Jacobite rising of 1745, McDonald fought as a lieutenant under the command of Charles Edward Stuart in the Battle of Culloden, after which he was "attainted of treason". He fled Scotland, departing from Inverness for the Colony of Virginia in 1746 at the age of 18. Following his arrival in Virginia, McDonald worked as a merchant in Falmouth for two or three years.

McDonald moved west into Virginia's interior and entered the military service of the colonial government under Lieutenant Governor Robert Dinwiddie, receiving the rank of captain. McDonald served in the French and Indian War under General John Forbes, in which he was in command of a company of Scottish Highlanders. Following the war, McDonald retired with the rank of captain in 1763.

In 1765, McDonald returned to military service when he was commissioned by Thomas Fairfax, 6th Lord Fairfax of Cameron as a major in command of the Frederick County militia. Lord Fairfax also appointed McDonald as an attorney and land agent for his Northern Neck Proprietary.

Governor John Murray, 4th Earl of Dunmore commissioned McDonald in 1774 as a ranking military officer of an expedition (known as "McDonald's Expedition") to promptly organize and recruit settlers west of the Allegheny Mountains to defend settlements from Native American attacks. McDonald completed the expedition, which met its goal of temporarily relieving western Virginia frontier settlements from attack.

McDonald received a personal letter from General George Washington in 1777 appointing him a lieutenant colonel in a battalion of Thruston's Additional Continental Regiment under the command of Colonel Charles Mynn Thruston. Despite his loyalty to the American Revolutionary cause, McDonald refused Washington's appointment. McDonald was later appointed by Washington to serve as a lieutenant colonel in command of Virginia revolutionary militia forces during the American Revolutionary War. He also served on various revolutionary committees throughout the war.

== Early life ==
Angus McDonald was born in 1727 in the Scottish Highlands. He was an immediate family member of a chief of the Clan MacDonell of Glengarry, whose clan seat was Invergarry Castle. He was probably the son of Angus McDonald, who was a younger son of Alastair Dubh MacDonell, the commander of the Glengarry clan in the Battle of Killiecrankie in 1689 during the early Jacobite risings. McDonald was a lineal descendant of a long line of military heroes of the Clan MacDonell of Glengarry and of Somerled, Lord of the Isles. McDonald was raised and educated in Glasgow. During the Jacobite rising of 1745, McDonald fought as a lieutenant under the command of Charles Edward Stuart in the Battle of Culloden, after which he was "attainted of treason". He fled Scotland, departing from Inverness for the Colony of Virginia in 1746 at the age of 18.

== Colonial military service ==
=== Early colonial military career ===
McDonald arrived in Virginia at the port of Falmouth on the Rappahannock River. Among the belongings he brought with him were the short sword, sash and gorget bearing the Glengarry coat of arms that he had worn at the Battle of Culloden. Following his arrival, McDonald remained in Falmouth for two or three years where he worked as a merchant. McDonald moved west into Virginia's interior and entered the military service of the colonial government under Lieutenant Governor Robert Dinwiddie, receiving the rank of captain. In return for his "meritorious service" in conflicts against Native Americans, McDonald received 400 acres (1.6 km^{2}) of land from the colonial government of Virginia in 1754. Around that same year, McDonald moved further west to the settlement of Winchester where he established the first Masonic Lodge in 1760. While in Winchester, McDonald served as a member of the Committee of Safety.

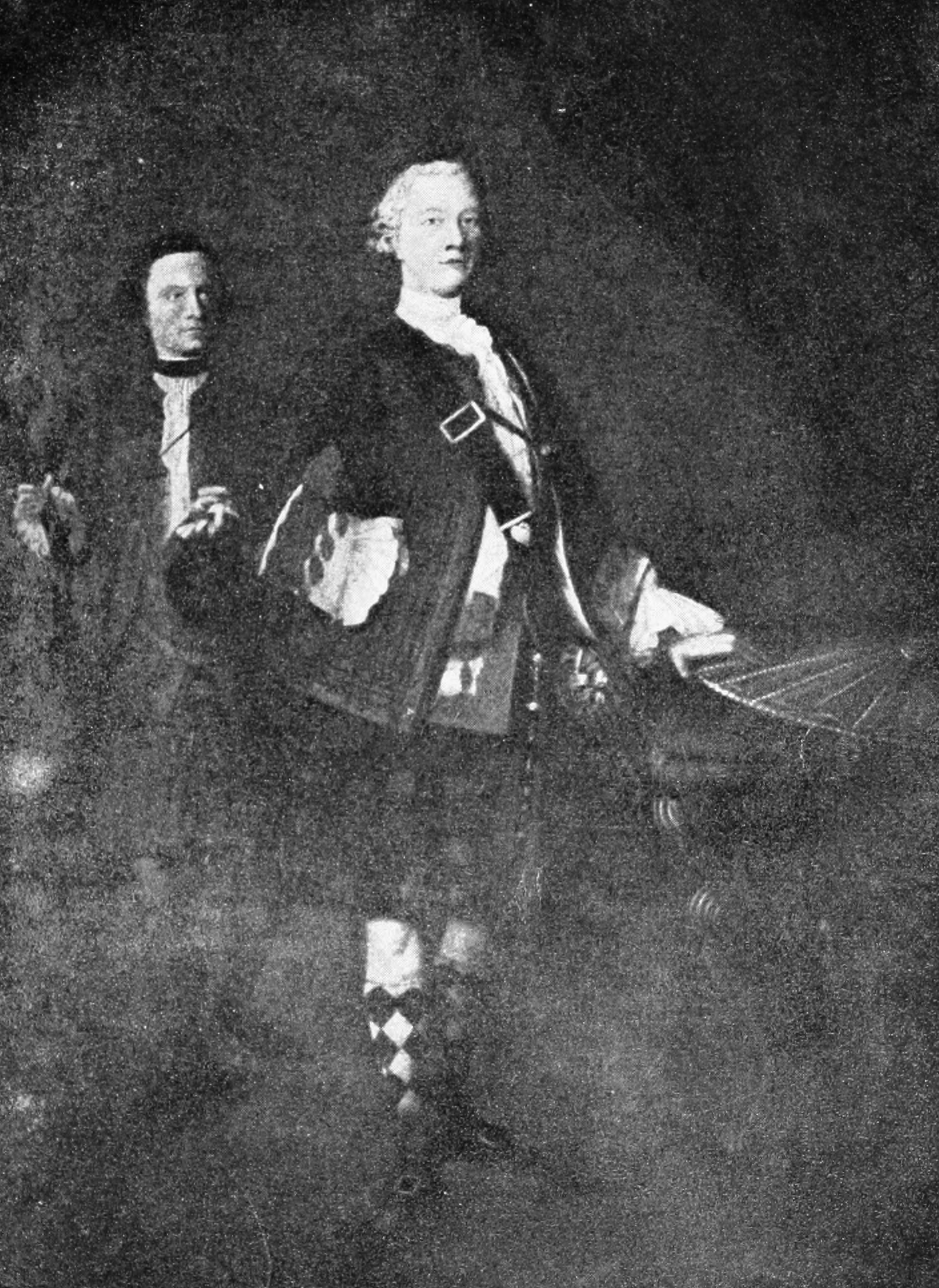
McDonald's grandfather, Alastair Dubh McDonald (pictured), served as the commander of the Glengarry clan in the Battle of Killiecrankie in 1689 during the early Jacobite risings.

McDonald served in the French and Indian War under General John Forbes in which he was in command of a company of Scottish Highlanders. McDonald and his company marched against Fort Duquesne in the autumn of 1758. Following the war, McDonald retired with the rank of captain in 1763. Upon his retirement, Governor John Murray, 4th Earl of Dunmore granted McDonald an additional 2,000 acres (8.1 km^{2}) of land, which were surveyed by Hancock Taylor. On October 29, 1762, prior to his land grant from Lord Dunmore, McDonald purchased 370 acres (1.5 km^{2}) from Brian Bruin east of Winchester on which he built the original McDonald family residence in the region, which he named Glengarry after his ancestral homeland.

In 1765, McDonald returned to military service when he was commissioned by Thomas Fairfax, 6th Lord Fairfax of Cameron as a major in command of the Frederick County militia. That same year, Lord Fairfax appointed McDonald as an attorney and land agent for his Northern Neck Proprietary. By 1769, McDonald was a magistrate of the Frederick County court along with associate magistrates Lord Fairfax, Samuel Washington (brother of George Washington), Warner Washington (Washington's first cousin), Taverner Beale and Reverend Charles Mynn Thruston.

In early 1774, McDonald participated in an expedition surveying the "military bounty lands" lying along the Ohio and Kanawha rivers to be granted by the colonial government of Virginia to soldiers and officers in exchange for their military service in the French and Indian War. The expedition was cut short due to hostilities with Native Americans, and McDonald provided an account of these hostilities and reports he received of attacks against settlers to Lord Dunmore. McDonald's accounts along with those of other settlers resulted in Lord Dunmore's decision to wage a war against the Native Americans to pacify the frontier lands of western Virginia for continued settlement.

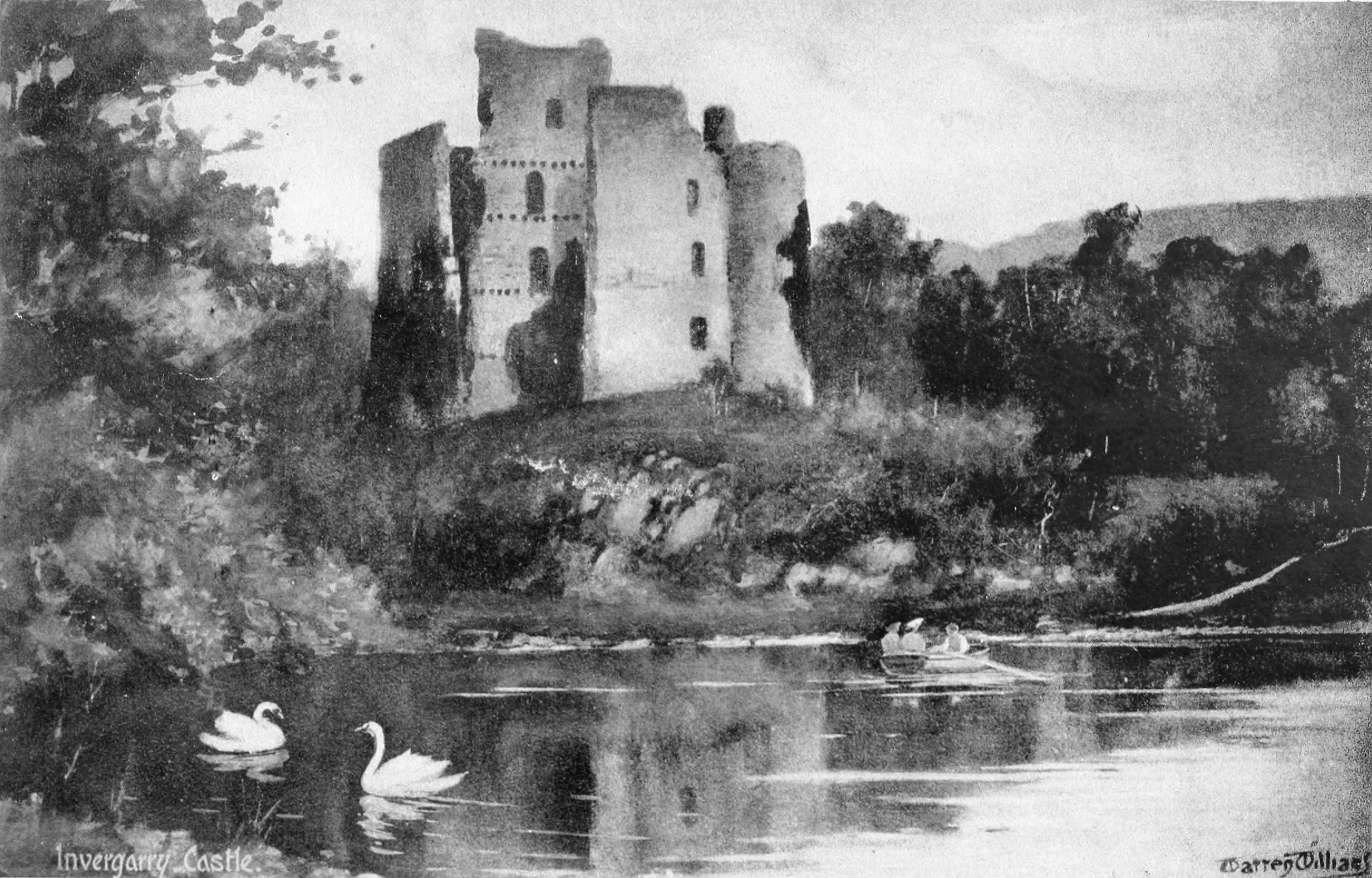
McDonald was an immediate family member of a chief of the Clan MacDonell of Glengarry, whose clan seat was Invergarry Castle (pictured) overlooking Loch Oich.

=== McDonald's Expedition and Dunmore's War ===
In early June 1774, Lord Dunmore further commissioned McDonald as a ranking military officer of an expedition (known as "McDonald's Expedition") to promptly organize and recruit settlers west of the Allegheny Mountains along the Youghiogheny and Monongahela rivers in order to defend European American settlements from Native American attacks. Lord Dunmore commissioned Michael Cresap as a captain under McDonald's command and placed him in charge of the enlistment of a force from Hampshire County. McDonald and Cresap's combined forces numbered approximately 400 men following their convergence near present-day Wheeling on the Ohio River. In addition to Cresap, other captains in the expedition included Michael Cresap Jr., Hancock Lee, Daniel Morgan, James Wood and Henry Hoagland.

Once the entire force had converged near Wheeling, McDonald and Captain William Crawford directed the construction of Fort Fincastle in July 1774. Following the erection of the stockade, McDonald ordered each of his soldiers to pack seven days' worth of provisions. On July 26, 1774, his forces crossed the Ohio River at the mouth of Fish Creek about 24 miles (39 km) south of Fort Fincastle. McDonald's forces continued down the Ohio River in boats and canoes until they reached the mouth of Captina Creek, from which they marched toward the Shawnee villages of Wakatomika (also known as Wapatomica) near the mouth of Wakatomika Creek (modern-day Dresden, Ohio) on the Muskingum River. McDonald's forces had not encountered any enemy Native American forces on their expedition until about 6 miles (9.7 km) from Wakatomika, where they were ambushed by a force of approximately 30 to 50 Shawnee arranged in columns at the head of a swampy crossing. The ambush resulted in the deaths of two soldiers and the wounding of up to eight or nine more.

Following the ambush, McDonald and his forces reached the Muskingum River around nightfall on August 2, 1774. McDonald and his forces arrived at the "chief Wakatomika town" only to discover that it had been evacuated by its Shawnee inhabitants, who were found nearby preparing to ambush McDonald's forces. The Shawnee in ambuscade surrendered to McDonald in exchange for peace. McDonald's forces continued their march onto the next Wakatomika settlement, where a further ambush ensued resulting in the burning of Shawnee cabins and villages. The ambush also resulted in the destruction of Shawnee plantations and maize fields. McDonald and his forces took three Shawnee scalps and one prisoner. McDonald and his forces returned to Wheeling with three Shawnee tribal chiefs as captives, who were then sent on to the colonial Virginia seat of government, Williamsburg. McDonald completed the expedition, which met its goal of temporarily relieving western Virginia frontier settlements from Native American attack. He continued to serve under Lord Dunmore until the end of the war. In a letter dated January 8, 1775, following his return to Winchester from Williamsburg, McDonald recounted of the war, "all the Country is well pleased with the Governours Expeditions." Following Dunmore's War in December 1774, McDonald was further promoted to the rank of lieutenant colonel.

On August 6, 1776, McDonald was appointed and took the oath of the sheriff and justice of Frederick County by the county court under an ordinance of the Virginia Convention of 1776. While serving as sheriff, he was placed in command of the militias of both Augusta and Frederick counties. At the time of his command of the Frederick and Augusta militias, the two counties encompassed much of the territory of Virginia between the Ohio River, the Tennessee boundary and the Blue Ridge Mountains, with the exception of Hampshire County which had been created from parts of Frederick and Augusta counties in 1754.

== American Revolutionary War ==
During the onset of the American Revolution, McDonald was an ardent Whig. In March 1777, McDonald received a personal letter from General George Washington appointing him a lieutenant colonel in a battalion of Thruston's Additional Continental Regiment under the command of Colonel Charles Mynn Thruston, a former rector of Cunningham Chapel in present-day Clarke County, Virginia, and a former associate magistrate of the Frederick County court, where he served alongside McDonald. Despite his loyalty to the American Revolutionary cause, McDonald refused the appointment for either of two reasons: he would have been second-in-command to a colonel lacking prior military experience and McDonald had previously been a member of the vestry of Cunningham Chapel and resigned following a dispute with Thruston over "a matter of business with the church". General Adam Stephen, a fellow Scotsman, wrote a letter to McDonald dated March 15, 1777, in which he implored him to accept Washington's appointment, stating "Your appointment comes entirely from your own merit." Stephen warned McDonald not to let his "Highland pride" dissuade him from serving under Thruston and in the event McDonald still refused Washington's offer, Stephen wrote: "Write a polite letter to General Washington thanking his excellency for his notice and making the best excuse you can."

McDonald was later appointed by Washington to serve as a lieutenant colonel in command of Virginia revolutionary militia forces during the American Revolutionary War. He also served on various revolutionary committees throughout the war. McDonald died on August 19, 1778, at his home Glengarry near Winchester after receiving an incorrect dosage of the medication potassium antimonyl tartrate.

== Legacy ==
An article published in the Winchester Star in 1967 said of McDonald, "fearsome or not, he founded in the Shenandoah Valley a dynasty of military men as distinguished as their forebears had been in the Scottish Highlands." In its documentation of Dunmore's War, the Wisconsin Historical Society stated, "McDonald was a man of commanding figure and strong personality and a rigid disciplinarian with his troops."

== Marriage and children ==
McDonald married Anna Thompson (1748 – about 1832) of Hancock, Maryland on June 20, 1766. Anna was a daughter of John Thompson and his wife, Yocomanche Eltinge. The Eltinge family was of Dutch descent. McDonald and his wife had seven children, four sons and three daughters:

- Mary McDonald Langham (May 9, 1767 – ?), married Elias Langham
- John McDonald (August 19, 1768 – about 1837)
- Angus McDonald (December 30, 1769 – October 14, 1814), married Mary McGuire on January 11, 1798
- Eleanor McDonald Tidball (September 5, 1771 – ?), married James Tidball
- Anna McDonald Holliday (June 25, 1773 – ?), married Richard Holliday
- Thompson McDonald (March 29, 1776 – July 31, 1822)
- Charles McDonald (April 28, 1778 – died in infancy)

== Bibliography ==
- Benjamin, Marcus; National Society of the Sons of the American Revolution; District of Columbia Society (1897). Report of the Historian of the District of Columbia Society of the Sons of the American Revolution for the Years 1895 and 1896. Washington, D.C.: Law Reporter Company. OCLC 13588882. Archived from the original on October 31, 2013 – via Google Books.
- Brannon, Selden W., ed. (1976). Historic Hampshire: A Symposium of Hampshire County and Its People, Past and Present. Parsons, West Virginia: McClain Printing Company. ISBN 978-0-87012-236-1. OCLC 3121468.
- Butterfield, Consul Willshire (1877). The Washington–Crawford Letters Being the Correspondence Between George Washington and William Crawford, from 1767 to 1781, Concerning Western Lands. Cincinnati: Robert Clarke and Company. OCLC 3867861 – via Internet Archive.
- Heard, Joseph Norman (1987). Handbook of the American Frontier: Four Centuries of Indian–White Relationships, Volume I: The Southeastern Woodlands. Metuchen, New Jersey: Scarecrow Press. ISBN 978-0-8108-1931-3. OCLC 311444903 – via Google Books.
- Historical Society of Pennsylvania (1891). "Notes and Queries: Letter of General Adam Stephen". The Pennsylvania Magazine of History and Biography. 15. Philadelphia: Historical Society of Pennsylvania: 242–243. ISSN 0031-4587. OCLC 1762062 – via Google Books.
- Johnson, E. Polk (1912). A History of Kentucky and Kentuckians: The Leaders and Representative Men in Commerce, Industry and Modern Activities. Chicago: Lewis Publishing Company. OCLC 3791914 – via Google Books.
- Jones, Howard M. (February 19, 1914). "Hunter McDonald, President of the American Society of Civil Engineers". Engineering News. 71 (8). New York City: McGraw-Hill Publishing Company: 403–405. ISSN 0096-3690. OCLC 1386378 – via Google Books.
- Miller, Thomas Condit; Maxwell, Hu (1913). West Virginia and Its People, Volume 2. New York City: Lewis Historical Publishing Company. OCLC 1449151. Archived from the original on May 27, 2016 – via Google Books.
- Newton, J. H.; Nichols, G. G.; Sprankle, A. G. (1879). J. H. Newton (ed.). History of the Pan-Handle: Being Historical Collections of the Counties of Ohio, Brooke, Marshall and Hancock, West Virginia. Wheeling, West Virginia: J. A. Caldwell. OCLC 23158494. Archived from the original on November 12, 2015 – via Google Books.
- Smucker, Isaac (1875). "Military Expeditions to the North-West; VI. Col. McDonald's Expedition in 1774". Potter's American Monthly: An Illustrated Magazine of Story, Literature, Science and Art. 4–5 (8). Philadelphia: John E. Potter and Company: 21–26 – via Google Books.
- R. Sutton & Company (1883). History of Shelby County, Ohio with Illustrations and Biographical Sketches of Some of Its Prominent Men and Pioneers. Philadelphia: R. Sutton & Company – via Google Books.
- Washington, George (1889). Worthington Chauncey Ford (ed.). The Writings of George Washington: 1758–1775, Volume 2. New York City and London: G. P. Putnam's Sons – via Google Books.
- Wayland, John W. (2009). The Washingtons and Their Homes. Genealogical Publishing Company, Inc. ISBN 978-0-8063-4775-2. Archived from the original on January 1, 2014 – via Google Books.
- West Virginia Department of Archives and History (1976). West Virginia History, Volume 38. West Virginia Department of Archives and History – via Google Books.
- Williams, Flora McDonald (1911). The Glengarry McDonalds of Virginia. Louisville, Kentucky: George G. Fetter Company. OCLC 5149045 – via Google Books.
- Wisconsin Historical Society; National Society of the Sons of the American Revolution; Wisconsin Society (1905). Reuben Gold Thwaites; Louise Phelps Kellogg (eds.). Documentary History of Dunmore's War, 1774: Compiled from the Draper Manuscripts in the Library of the Wisconsin Historical Society and Published at the Charge of the Wisconsin Society of the Sons of the American Revolution. Wisconsin Historical Society – via Internet Archive.
