= Angus William McDonald =

American politician

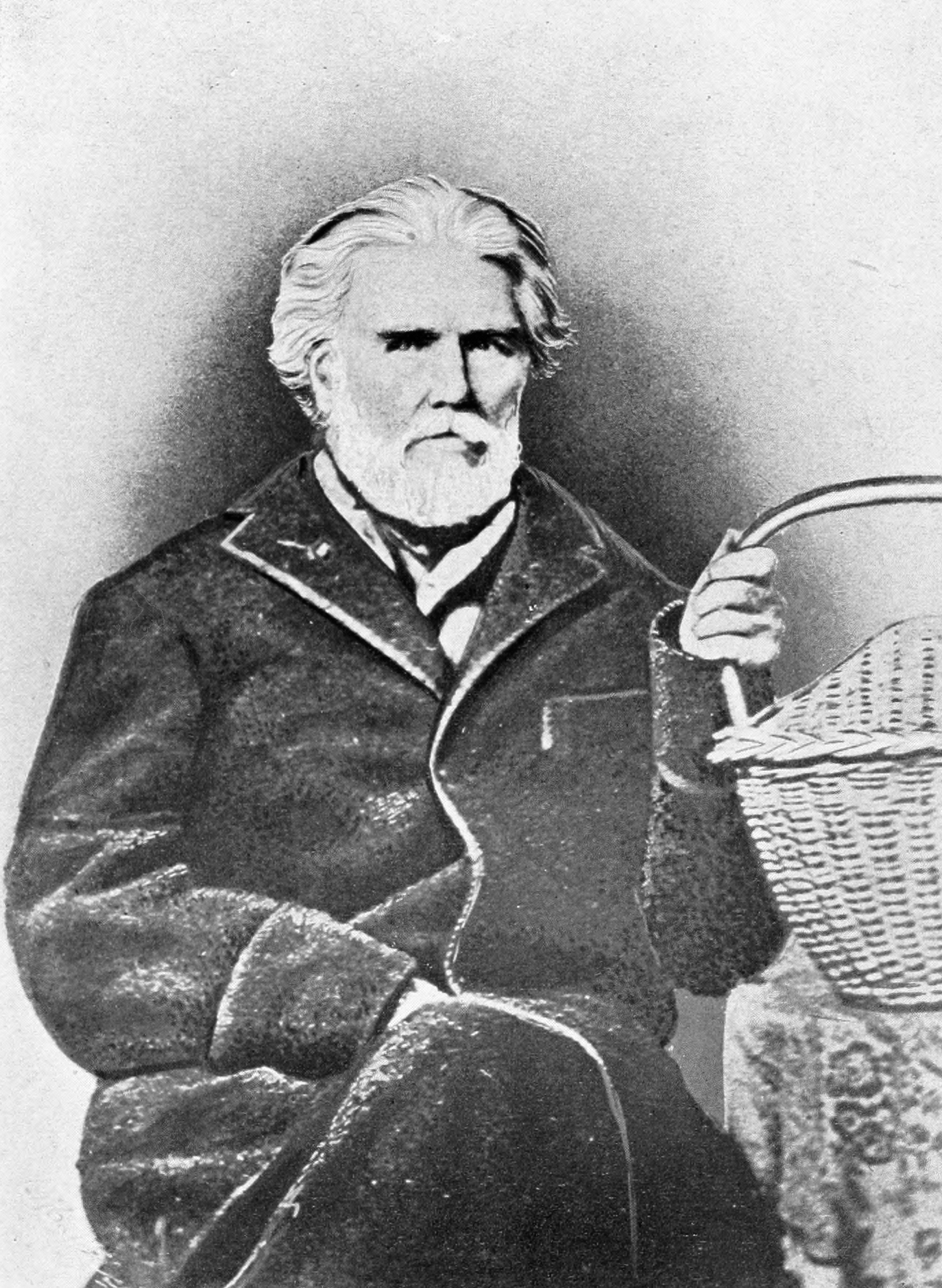
- Portrait of Angus William McDonald
- Born: Angus William McDonald; February 14, 1799; Winchester, Virginia, United States
- Died: December 1, 1864 (aged 65); Richmond, Virginia, Confederate States of America
- Burial place: Hollywood Cemetery, United States
- Education: United States Military Academy
- Spouse(s): Leacy Anne Naylor; Cornelia Peake
- Relatives: 18 children including: Angus William McDonald Jr. Edward Allen Hitchcock McDonald; William Naylor McDonald; Marshall McDonald; Craig Woodrow McDonald; Other relations: Angus McDonald (grandfather); Angus McDonald (father)
- Military career
- Allegiance: United States of America; Confederate States of America
- Branch: United States Army; Confederate States Army
- Service years: 1817–1819 (USA); 1861–1864 (CSA)
- Rank: First lieutenant (USA); Colonel (CSA)
- Unit: 7th U.S. Infantry Regiment
- Commands: 7th Virginia Cavalry Regiment (CSA)
- Conflicts: American Civil War
- Other work: Military officer, fur trader, lawyer, deputy sheriff

Angus William McDonald (February 14, 1799 – December 1, 1864) was a 19th-century American military officer and lawyer in the U.S. state of Virginia. He also served as a colonel in command of the Confederate States Army's 7th Virginia Cavalry during the American Civil War. McDonald was appointed to serve in a number of prominent political positions including a superintendent overseeing the construction of the Northwestern Turnpike and a commissioner representing Virginia in its boundary dispute with Maryland. McDonald was the grandson of Virginia military officer and frontiersman, Angus McDonald (1727–1778) and the father of United States Fish Commissioner Marshall McDonald (1835–1895).

== Early life and education ==
Angus William McDonald was born on February 14, 1799, in Winchester, Virginia. He was the eldest child of prominent local planter Angus McDonald (1769–1814) and his wife, Mary McGuire McDonald (d. 1809) and the grandson of Virginia militiaman, frontiersman, and landowner Angus McDonald (1727–1778). McDonald was of Scottish and Dutch descent through his father, and of French and Irish descent through his mother. In 1809, following the death of his mother, McDonald and his younger brother and sister were sent by their father to "Glengarry" plantation near Winchester to live with their grandmother, Anna Thompson McDonald. By about the age of twelve, McDonald attended Winchester Academy where he was taught by Scotchman Mr. Hetterick. While attending the academy in Winchester, McDonald resided at the home of his uncle, Edward McGuire.

== U.S. Military Academy and early military career ==
On July 30, 1814, McDonald entered the United States Military Academy at West Point, New York, following his appointment by United States President James Madison. In October 1814, McDonald's father, a United States Army major, died following a forced march near Batavia, New York, during operations related to the War of 1812. McDonald initially gained admission to the academy's fourth class, but after much progress, he was permitted to pass during the middle of his third year from the second class into the first class, thus completing his education there in three years. Among his close friends at the academy was Ethan Allen Hitchcock, whom McDonald would name his second eldest son after.

McDonald graduated from the academy on July 17, 1817, and was subsequently promoted to the rank of third lieutenant in the 7th Infantry Regiment. On April 1, 1818, McDonald was further promoted to the rank of first lieutenant in the 7th Infantry Regiment. McDonald served in garrison at New Orleans in 1817 and at Mobile Bay, Alabama, in 1818. After several attempts at a transfer to a post within the American Frontier were unsuccessful, McDonald resigned his commission on January 31, 1819 and set out for the Western frontier to pursue a career in the fur trade.

== Fur trading career ==
From Mobile Bay, he traveled to St. Louis in the Missouri Territory where he befriended a number of fur traders. McDonald then embarked as a clerk employed by the Missouri Fur Company, and within his first year with the company, he mastered several Native American languages and assumed the duties of a language interpreter. McDonald became a full partner of the company in his second year, but soon after, it went bankrupt and McDonald continued on by engaging in his own successful trapping and trading business on the Yellowstone River for another three years. During his experiences on the American frontier, McDonald formed associations with several Native American tribes and their chiefs, including "Tobacco", a powerful chief of the Mandan tribe. McDonald's athletic physique, confidence, and fearlessness earned him the sobriquet of "Big Knife" from various Native American tribes of the Missouri Territory. McDonald frequently returned to St. Louis with cargoes of furs and skins, which earned him large sums of money.

After about four years on the American frontier, McDonald became attracted by the prospects of settling and developing the southwestern frontier. He and ten of his colleagues crafted a plan to organize "a body of emigrants" on the American frontier and wrest Texas and the southwest from the United Mexican States and establish a sovereign state. McDonald returned to Winchester, Virginia, to recruit participants in his endeavor.

== Law career and political appointments ==
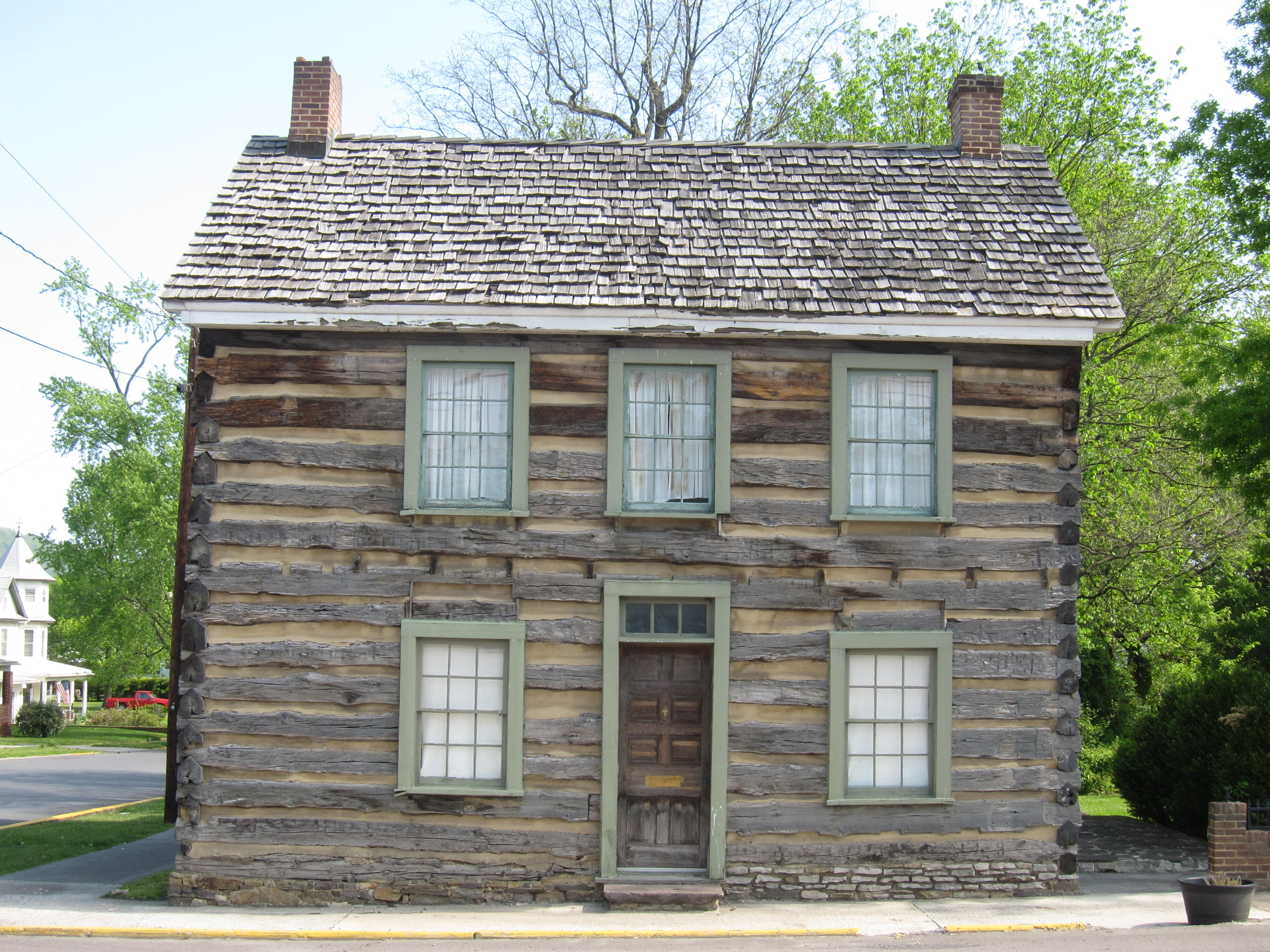
McDonald and his wife Leacy Anne resided in this log dwelling in Romney, Virginia (now West Virginia) and raised their nine children here. Known as the Davis History House, McDonald's former home serves as an American Civil War museum maintained by the Hampshire County Public Library.

Shortly before his would-be departure from Winchester, McDonald met Leacy Anne Naylor, the daughter of prominent Romney lawyer William Naylor. McDonald abandoned his plans to wrest Texas from Mexico and instead settled in Romney to study law. In a little over a year, McDonald was admitted to the bar and established his law practice in Romney. In addition to his law profession, McDonald served as deputy sheriff of Hampshire County. Shortly after his admittance to the bar, McDonald married Leacy Anne Naylor on January 11, 1827. McDonald and his wife resided in a log dwelling located on Lot 26 at the intersection of West Main and North Bolton Streets in Romney. The house, presently an American Civil War museum known as the Davis History House, had been purchased by Leacy Anne's father William Naylor, and she and McDonald raised their nine children there. McDonald became well known in the legal profession and continued to engage in and grow his lucrative law practice for the succeeding 17 years, which allowed him to amass and invest in large tracts of land in the American West. He was appointed or elected prosecuting attorney of Hampshire County in 1836. His son, Angus William McDonald Jr., later joined his father in the legal profession.

=== Northwestern Turnpike superintendent ===
In 1832, McDonald was appointed state superintendent for the construction of the Northwestern Turnpike (present-day U.S. Route 50) through Hampshire and present-day Mineral counties under the leadership of his former West Point professor of engineering, Virginia Board of Public Works chief engineer Claudius Crozet. McDonald created many enemies in his role as superintendent due to his attunement to cost efficiency and his "haughty" nature. He succeeded in building the turnpike through fertile agricultural fields, as was the case of Joseph Kackley's farmland in Smokey Hollow, the most fertile field of which was lost due to both the old and new turnpike routes traversing it. McDonald also proposed building the turnpike through the garden of the Clerk of the Hampshire County Court, John Baker White. White won a court appeal resulting in the rerouting of the road. This rerouting remains evident today in the curve of Main Street in Romney in front of White's residence, now known as "Liberty Hall". McDonald was forced from his position as superintendent and was replaced by William S. Naylor on April 5, 1834.

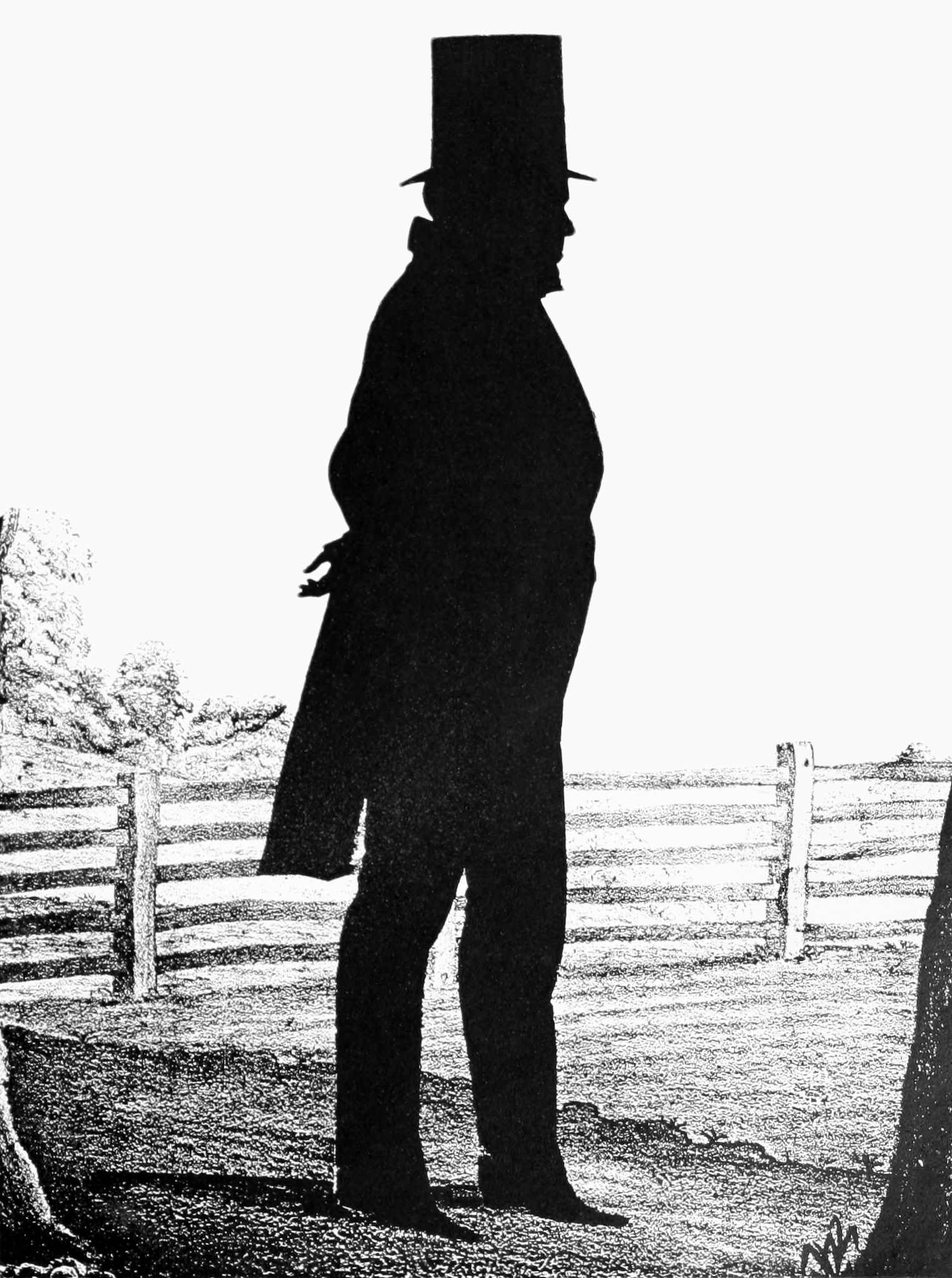
Profile silhouette of McDonald.

=== Romney Literary Society ===
McDonald was a prominent member of the Romney Literary Society and served on the board of trustees governing Romney Academy following his appointment by the Virginia General Assembly on March 25, 1839.

=== Political activities ===
While McDonald did not bear any ambitions for political office, he became an active leader in support of political causes and positions he believed in. His personal political ideologies remained consistently states' rights-oriented despite the ever-shifting platforms of American political parties. Throughout his legal and later public careers, McDonald affiliated himself with the Democratic-Republican Party, the Whig Party, and finally, the Democratic Party.

Following the death of McDonald's wife Leacy Anne on February 3, 1843, he increased his participation and involvement in political activities. In keeping with the Virginia law requiring citizens to own a particular amount of land in order to exercise their right of suffrage, McDonald transferred tracts of land of the requisite amount of acres to young men belonging to the Whig Party to enable their vote in elections that McDonald was particularly interested in the outcome of. McDonald's maneuver made him many enemies in the opposing Democratic Party, and when he requested permission from Democratic United States President James K. Polk to raise a regiment of volunteers to fight in the Mexican–American War, his request was denied.

=== Virginia boundary commissioner ===
McDonald and his family resided at "Wind Lea" in present-day Keyser, West Virginia, from around 1850 until at least 1856

McDonald returned to Missouri in 1846, and took up residence in Hannibal where he had made several large investments. McDonald traveled between Virginia and Missouri, and on one of his stays in Hannibal, he met Cornelia Peake, whose sister, Susan Peake, was married to McDonald's brother, Edward Charles McDonald. McDonald and Cornelia married on May 27, 1847, in Hannibal, and in 1848 the couple returned to Romney where McDonald resumed his law practice. He sold the log dwelling in Romney to William Davis in 1849, although McDonald and his family continued to reside in Romney at least until 1850 In 1853, McDonald and his family relocated to "Wind Lea" in Paddy Town (now known as Keyser), a settlement along the North Branch Potomac River and Baltimore and Ohio Railroad in western Hampshire County (now Mineral County). McDonald's wife, Cornelia, successfully persuaded the United States Post Office Department to change the name of Paddy Town to Wind Lea, after which it was changed again to New Creek Station following the McDonald family's departure. McDonald and his family returned to Romney before subsequently moving to McDonald's hometown of Winchester. In 1856, McDonald purchased "Hawthorne" at 610 Amherst Street in Winchester and he and his wife relocated there from Romney. "Hawthorne" had previously been owned by Virginia Governor James Wood and George Washington's nephew Lawrence Augustine Washington.

Shortly after his move to Winchester, McDonald was appointed by Virginia Governor Henry A. Wise as a commissioner representing Virginia in resolving a boundary dispute with Maryland. Maryland appointed Lieutenant N. Michler as its commissioner, and he and McDonald commenced their inquiry at a location along the Scarborough line, where McDonald discovered that Maryland had long been in possession of land that rightfully belonged to Virginia. McDonald communicated his discovery to the Virginia General Assembly in the Winter of 1859, after which the legislature authorized him to travel to England in order to conduct further research for boundary records in the archives of the State Paper Office. McDonald arrived in London in July 1860 and immediately began conducting his research. He was received by the Court of St. James's as merely a representative of a state of the United States, and not as a representative of a sovereign state, which prompted McDonald to decline an offer by George M. Dallas to present McDonald to Queen Victoria. McDonald remained in London for five months before discovering enough records and manuscripts to substantiate Virginia's land claim. He returned to the United States via New York in November 1860 and was welcomed on the night of his return to Winchester by a number of his friends, including United States Senator James Murray Mason. The boundary dispute between Virginia and Maryland would not be resolved until the Maryland v. West Virginia, 217 U.S. 1 (1910), ruling by the United States Supreme Court, which held that the boundary between Maryland and West Virginia (which had seceded from Virginia in 1863) was the south bank of the Potomac River.

== American Civil War ==
Prior to the outbreak of the American Civil War, McDonald sympathized with the secessionist cause, but his feelings softened during his trip abroad, where he found a "united republic" preferable to a cluster of sovereign states like Europe. Upon his return, McDonald renewed his secessionist sentiments and following Virginia's secession from the United States in April 1861, he traveled to Harpers Ferry to volunteer his services to the Confederate States Army. General Kenton Harper assigned McDonald to the duty of guarding the bridges and fords crossing the Potomac River downstream of Harpers Ferry. A company that included Captain Turner Ashby was assigned to McDonald, who divided it into small detachments that were sent out on scouting expeditions as far south as Washington City. Following the scouting expeditions, McDonald realized the need for a topographic corps and after selecting suitable men for this service, he organized the first topographic corps in Virginia. McDonald was commissioned as a captain of cavalry.

=== 7th Virginia Cavalry command ===
McDonald served as the first colonel in command of the 7th Virginia Cavalry, which he formed later in the Spring of 1861. In June 1861, McDonald and his cavalry occupied Romney, but were defeated by Union Army forces in their defense of the town by July. McDonald's 7th Virginia Cavalry fought a Union column under the command of Colonel James Cantwell in the Skirmish at Hanging Rock Pass on September 24, 1861. On the evening of September 23, 1861, McDonald received information that Union Army forces planned an attempt to pass through the gap at Hanging Rocks early the next morning. Upon learning of this, McDonald and his 26 troops climbed to the top of Hanging Rocks in the early morning of September 24 in preparation for the arrival of Union troops. McDonald also sent a scouting party down the South Branch on the night of September 23. McDonald and his cavalry recaptured Romney from Union Army forces on September 24, thus causing Union Army forces to retreat to Keyser.

McDonald was forced to resign his command of the 7th Virginia Cavalry in late 1861 due to severe rheumatism. Following the aftermath of Major General Stonewall Jackson's Romney Expedition, McDonald traveled to Richmond, where he served as an advisor to the Confederate States War Department. McDonald's wife remained at "Hawthorne" with her eight children, two slaves, and three servants until June 1863, when she relocated to Lexington, Virginia, to live with McDonald.

=== Prisoner of war ===
In July 1864, while McDonald was residing in Lexington, he was arrested along with his son Harry by Union Army General David Hunter, who had previously caused damage to his property "Hawthorne" in Winchester. McDonald and his son, who was then aged 16, were taken prisoner. Harry escaped one or two days later, but McDonald remained captive and was hastily "tied and dragged" to the Maryland state line. McDonald was taken to Cumberland where he was handcuffed and placed in solitary confinement and then subsequently transferred to a military prison in Wheeling. At Wheeling, McDonald was treated cruelly and held handcuffed in a "dungeon" measuring seven by ten feet. McDonald was permitted a Bible in his cell, from which he derived "great peace and comfort" during his captivity.

Following his release from prison, McDonald was reunited with his children and resided with his daughter at her home in Richmond. His incarceration had further deteriorated his already poor health which had been in decline for a number of years. While it was his intention to return to his residence in Lexington, McDonald's nervous system continued to deteriorate and he died on December 1, 1864. His wife had been notified of her husband's declining health, but was unable to make it to Richmond until the day following his death. McDonald's funeral service was held the evening after his death on December 2 at St. Paul's Episcopal Church and he was interred with full military honors at Hollywood Cemetery in Richmond.

== Children ==
McDonald and his first wife Leacy Anne Naylor had nine children together consisting of five sons and four daughters:

Portrait	Name	Birth and death dates	Spouse
Mary Naylor McDonald Green	Mary Naylor McDonald Green	Born December 27, 1827	Married on April 27, 1852, Thomas Claiborne Green
Angus William McDonald Jr.	Angus William McDonald Jr.	Born May 16, 1829	Married on February 17, 1857, Elizabeth Morton Sherrard; Married on June 5, 1894, Mary Elizabeth Riddle
Anne Sanford McDonald Green	Anne Sanford McDonald Green	Born October 30, 1830	Married on December 20, 1855, James W. Green
Edward Allen Hitchcock McDonald	Edward Allen Hitchcock McDonald	Born October 26, 1832	
William Naylor McDonald	William Naylor McDonald	Born February 1834	Married in August 1867, Catherine S. Gray
Marshall McDonald	Marshall McDonald	October 18, 1835 – September 1, 1895	Married on December 17, 1867, Mary E. McCormick
Craig Woodrow McDonald	Craig Woodrow McDonald	May 28, 1837 – May 29, 1862	
	Susan Leacy McDonald Stanard	Born December 9, 1839	Married on August 6, 1872, John B. Stanard
Flora McDonald Williams	Flora McDonald Williams	Born June 7, 1842	Married on December 18, 1867, Leroy Eustace Williams

McDonald married for a second time to Cornelia Peake McDonald and together they had nine children consisting of seven sons and two daughters:

Portrait	Name	Birth and death dates	Spouse
Harry Peake McDonald	Harry Peake McDonald	Born April 14, 1848	Married on April 14, 1875, Alice Keats Speed
Allan Lane McDonald	Allan Lane McDonald	Born October 30, 1849	Married on February 13, 1878, Fannie B. Snead
	Humphrey McDonald	December 31, 1850 – July 30, 1851	
Kenneth McDonald	Kenneth McDonald	Born July 18, 1852	Married on November 20, 1879, America R. Moore
Ellen McDonald Lyne	Ellen McDonald Lyne	Born September 30, 1854	Married in 1883, James Henry Lyne
Roy McDonald	Roy McDonald	Born August 25, 1856	Married on November 23, 1882, Nellie Caine; Married Jean Martin
Donald McDonald	Donald McDonald	Born September 5, 1858	Married on October 26, 1887, Betsy Breckinridge Carr
Hunter McDonald	Hunter McDonald	Born June 12, 1860	Married in 1893, Mary Eloise Gordon
	Elizabeth McDonald	October 29, 1861 – August 23, 1862	

== Publications ==
- McDonald, Angus William (1861). Report of Col. A. W. McDonald: Relative to His Mission to England, March 1861. William F. Ritchie, public printer.

== Bibliography ==
- Brannon, Selden W., ed. (1976). Historic Hampshire: A Symposium of Hampshire County and Its People, Past and Present. Parsons, West Virginia: McClain Printing Company. ISBN 978-0-87012-236-1. OCLC 3121468.
- Chambers, S. Allen (2004). Buildings of West Virginia, Volume 9 of Buildings of the United States Series. Oxford, United Kingdom: Oxford University Press. ISBN 978-0-19-516548-7.
- Collins, Reba Neighbors (1975). History of the Janes-Peek Family, From Grandma's Little Trunk. Reba Neighbors Collins.
- Davis, William C.; Robertson Jr., James I. (2012). Virginia at War, 1865. Lexington, Kentucky: University Press of Kentucky. ISBN 978-0-8131-3468-0.
- Duncan, Richard R. (2007). Beleaguered Winchester: A Virginia Community at War, 1861–1865. Baton Rouge, Louisiana: Louisiana State University Press. ISBN 978-0-8071-3217-3.
- Maryland Historical Society (1890). Fund Publication No. 29: Report of the Committee on the Western Boundary of Maryland. Baltimore, Maryland: John Murphy and Company.
- Maxwell, Hu; Swisher, Howard Llewellyn (1897). History of Hampshire County, West Virginia From Its Earliest Settlement to the Present. Morgantown, West Virginia: A. Brown Boughner, Printer. OCLC 680931891. OL 23304577M.
- McDonald, William Naylor (1907). Bushrod C. Washington (ed.). A History of the Laurel Brigade: Originally The Ashby Cavalry of the Army of Northern Virginia and Chew's Battery. Baltimore, Maryland: Kate S. McDonald, Sun Job Printing Office.
- McGhan, Judith (1982). Virginia Vital Records: From the Virginia Magazine of History and Biography, the William and Mary College Quarterly and Tyler's Quarterly. Genealogical Publishing Company. ISBN 9780806309842.
- Miller, Thomas Condit; Maxwell, Hu (1913). West Virginia and Its People, Volume 2. New York City, New York: Lewis Historical Publishing Company. OCLC 1449151.
- Morrison, Alfred James; Virginia State Board of Education (1917). The Beginnings of Public Education in Virginia, 1776–1860: Study of Secondary Schools in Relation to the State Literary Fund, Volume 187. D. Bottom, Superintendent of Public Printing.
- Munske, Roberta R.; Kerns, Wilmer L., eds. (2004). Hampshire County, West Virginia, 1754–2004. Romney, West Virginia: The Hampshire County 250th Anniversary Committee. ISBN 978-0-9715738-2-6. OCLC 55983178.
- Parker, Kathryn (2006). Images of America: Winchester, Virginia. Mount Pleasant, South Carolina: Arcadia Publishing. ISBN 978-0-7385-4315-4.
- Virginia General Assembly (1839). Acts passed at a General Assembly of the Commonwealth of Virginia. Virginia General Assembly.
- Williams, Flora McDonald (1911). The Glengarry McDonalds of Virginia. Louisville, Kentucky: George G. Fetter Company. OCLC 5149045.
