= Hanging Rocks =

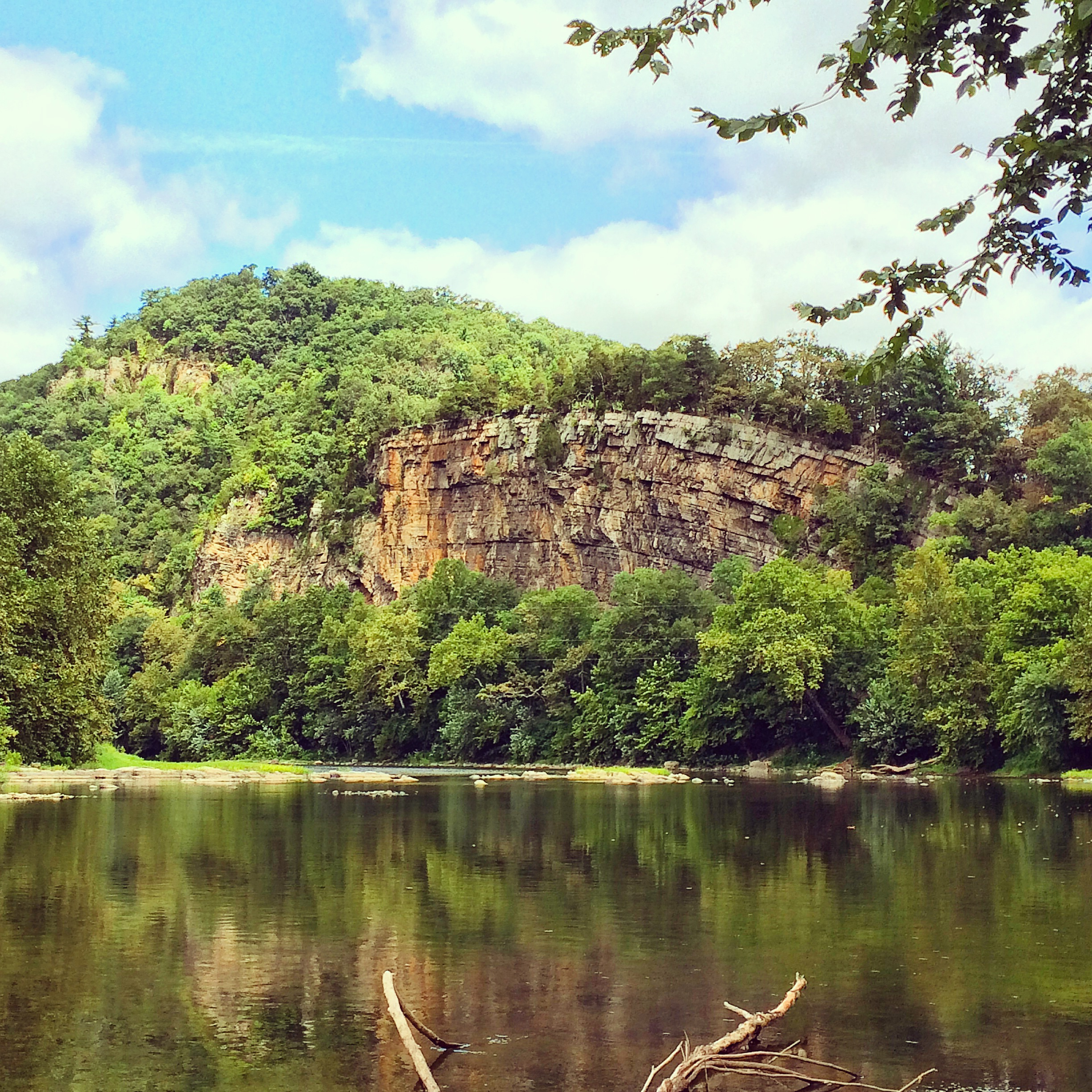
- Hanging Rocks viewed from the South Branch Potomac River
- Interactive map of Hanging Rocks
- Elevation: 1,040 ft (320 m)

Location
- Location: Hampshire County, West Virginia, United States
- Range: Mill Creek Mountain; Ridge and Valley Appalachians
- Coordinates: 39°23′56″N 78°44′21″W
- Topo map: USGS Springfield

Hanging Rocks are perpendicular cliffs rising nearly 300 feet (91 m) above the South Branch Potomac River in Hampshire County in the U.S. state of West Virginia. Hanging Rocks are located four miles (6 km) north of Romney at Wappocomo on West Virginia Route 28. Hanging Rocks has also been known throughout its history as Painted Rocks and Blue's Rocks. When distinguished from the "Lower Hanging Rocks" along the South Branch at Blues Beach to the north, Hanging Rocks is referred to as Upper Hanging Rocks.

== Geology ==
Hanging Rocks is arranged in the form of three anticlinal arches, of which the most eastern spans 250, the second 550, and the third 220 yards in width. Hanging Rocks consists of anticlinal stratified sandstone and limestone layers. The upper stratum of rocks is Monterey and Oriskany sandstone. Immediately below the Monterey and Oriskany (Ridgeley) sandstone lies a layer of cherty limestone known as Lewiston chert-lentil which consists of a conglomeration of brachiopods. Atop Hanging Rocks is a level bench of land devoid of stone and containing fine rich soil.

At the western end of the Hanging Rocks formation lies an exposure of fine black to drab shales also containing small concretions and some fossils. Contained in one of the shale layers are numerous specimens of Phacops cristata Hall. A volume of The Journal of Geology published by the University of Chicago in 1915 noted the following additional species collected in the layers of Hanging Rocks shale:

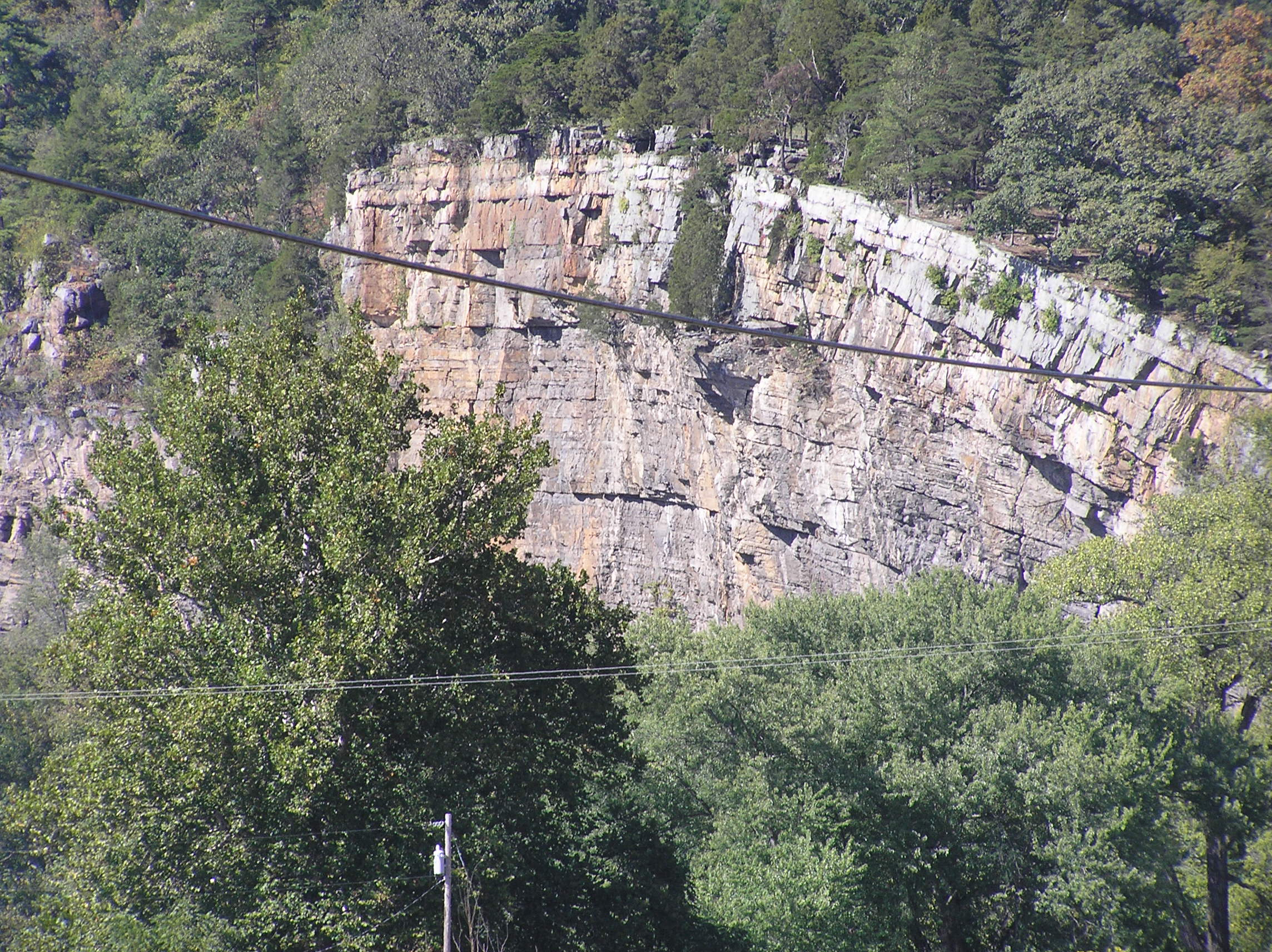
A close-up image of Hanging Rocks' strata.

- Stropheodonta sp.
- Chonetes cf. lepidus Hall
- Dalmanella lenticularis (Vanuxem)
- Cyrtina hamiltonensis (?) Hall
- Ambocoelia umbonata (Conrad)
- Styliolina fissurella (Hall)

Of the aforementioned fauna, Dalmanella lenticularis (Vanuxem) is confined to the Onondaga formation; Cyrtina hamiltonensis Hall occurs in the Onondaga, Hamilton, and Portage formations; Ambocoelia umbonata (Conrad) from the Onondaga to the Chemung inclusive; Styliolina fissurella (Hall) in the southern Onondaga shale, Marcellus, Genesee, and Portage black shales; and Phacops cristata Hall elsewhere in the Onondaga. The Journal of Geology concluded that the Romney shales present at both Hanging Rocks and Mechanicsburg Gap represent the southwestern continuation of the Onondaga limestone, Marcellus shale, and Hamilton formation of New York.

The Hanging Rocks formation lies within a deep and narrow gap in Mill Creek Mountain formed by the South Branch Potomac River. The distance through the gap at Hanging Rocks is five-eighths of a mile. The South Branch flowed in its present course as Mill Creek Mountain formed and slowly cut away at the mountain to expose Hanging Rocks.

The gap at Hanging Rocks is one of four gaps in Mill Creek Mountain, the others being Mechanicsburg Gap, the Lower Hanging Rocks gap at Blue Beach, and the gap at the North Branch Potomac River to the west of its confluence with the South Branch to form the Potomac River.

== History ==
=== Native American presence ===
==== Battle between the Lenape and the Catawbas ====
Hanging Rocks was originally the site of a Native American village, most likely either Lenape or Seneca. As such, it served as the scene of a fierce battle between the Lenape and Catawba Native Americans. A large party of Lenape had invaded the territory of the Catawbas, taken several prisoners, and commenced their retreat homewards. The retreating Lenape halted at Hanging Rocks and commenced fishing in the South Branch. The Catawbas, in close pursuit, discovered the Lenape and sent a party across the river to their rear and a party to their front, thus enclosing them. A bloody battle ensued resulting in the deaths of hundreds of Lenape. It is believed very few Lenape escaped the massacre.

==== Archaeological sites ====
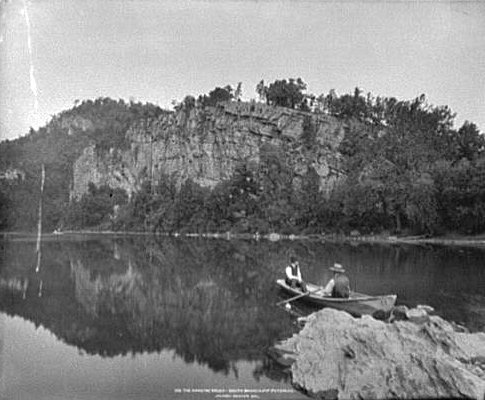
Hanging Rocks viewed from across the river in the 1890s.

At the time Samuel Kercheval's A History of the Valley of Virginia was written in 1833, a row of Indian graves, possibly belonging to the casualties of the aforementioned battle, existed between the public road and the perpendicular cliffs in the narrow margin of land along the South Branch. The graves Kercheval cites may have been reinterments of the human bones unearthed during the construction of the Baltimore and Ohio Railroad line along the base of Hanging Rocks in the 1880s.

Skeletons of "gigantic size" were exhumed from a purported village and burial site on the farm of Mr. Herriott opposite the South Branch and below Hanging Rocks, providing further evidence of a Native American presence at Hanging Rocks gap. In addition to skeletons, numerous fireplaces, iron hatchets, glass beads, and brass ornaments.

Persons well-versed in the history of the region assert that the Native American peoples occupying this village were a branch of the Seneca. There were formerly many stone mounds along the foot of the hill to the rear of this village, however, all of them have now been removed. Some of them were along the hillside a few feet above the margin of the level bottom; others were on the level but nowhere more than 50 or 60 feet (18 m) from the foot of the hill. The mounds varied in height from two to eight feet in diameter from 12 or 15 to 40 or 50 feet (15 m) and were composed entirely of stone. All except the smallest ones had a depression at the top as if they had contained a vault or pen of logs whose decay had allowed the rocks to settle. Fragmentary bones were found in many of the mounds lying on the original surface. Very few art relics were found at the mounds site. One contained a pipe with a wolf's head carved on it. A cairn on the hillside near the schoolhouse on the Herriott farm contained some decayed bones.

=== European settlement ===
The area surrounding Hanging Rocks was settled by European settlers around the mid-18th century. Trees had been cleared from the rocks before the arrival of settlers. Early residents in its vicinity referred to Hanging Rocks as "Painted Rocks" because of the colorful figures and formations within its strata. The colors and figures, once thought to be Native American, were produced through geologic processes including the seepage of water through the rock. During the French and Indian War, two frontier stockades were constructed in close proximity to Hanging Rocks for the defense of the South Branch Valley: Fort Williams in 1754 two miles (3 km) to the north and Fort Foreman one mile (1.6 km) to the south.

Francis Asbury, one of the first two bishops of the Methodist Episcopal Church, passed by Hanging Rocks during his travels in the South Branch Valley, which he described as a country of "mountains and natural curiosities." Asbury gave a description of Hanging Rocks in his journal on June 10, 1781:

On my way to R. Williams' I had a view of a hanging rock that appears like a castle wall, about three hundred feet high, and looks as if it had been built with square slate stones; at first glance a traveller would be ready to fear it would fall on him.

=== Transportation ===
The Moorefield and North Branch Turnpike (later known as the North and South Branches Turnpike) wagon road connecting Romney and Cumberland, Maryland, once occupied the narrow space between the South Branch and Hanging Rocks. The Baltimore and Ohio Railroad (currently the South Branch Valley Railroad) later shared the narrow space, which has varied between 40 feet (12 m) and 100 feet (30 m) in width, along with the pike after its completion to Romney from Green Spring in 1884. The pike later became West Virginia Route 28 and was rerouted to the east of Mill Creek Mountain. The old Romney and Cumberland Pike span at the base of Hanging Rocks was reclassified as West Virginia Secondary Route 28/15 and is currently named Harriott-Wappocomo Road.

=== American Civil War ===
On June 19, 1861, Captain John Q. Winfield wrote from his encampment at Hanging Rocks:

I am much pleased with our present location, which is in the midst of wealthy and hospitable people. The Inskips, Washingtons, and Parsons live around here in this valley. I am at the present writing from the home of Mrs. Inskip.

Captain Winfield's letter illustrated Hanging Rocks' proximity to some of Hampshire County's wealthiest families and their plantations including George William Washington and his son Robert M. Washington's Ridgedale, Colonel Isaac Parsons' Wappocomo, the Vance family's Ashbrook, and the Parsons and Inskeep families' The Rocks. General Turner Ashby and his command occupied the Washington family's Ridgedale to the north of Hanging Rocks.

==== Battle of Hanging Rocks Pass ====
A major skirmish, known as the Skirmish at Hanging Rock Pass, took place at Hanging Rocks on Tuesday morning September 24, 1861. The skirmish took place between the Confederate Hampshire Militia led by Colonel Angus William McDonald and several companies of Union troops under the command of Colonel Cantwell of the 82nd Ohio Infantry.

On the evening of September 23, 1861, Colonel McDonald received information that Union forces planned an attempt to pass through the gap at Hanging Rocks early the next morning. Upon learning of this, McDonald and his 26 other men of the Hampshire Militia climbed to the top of Hanging Rocks in the early morning of September 24 in preparation for the arrival of Union troops. McDonald also sent a scouting party down the South Branch on the night of September 23.

Hanging Rocks was a strategic location during the American Civil War. Troops traveling between Romney and points north, including Cumberland and Green Spring, naturally utilized the Romney and Cumberland Pike at the base of Hanging Rocks. In addition, the shallow nature of the South Branch at Hanging Rocks created a crossing which allowed for a secondary connection of the Romney and Cumberland Pike to the Northwestern Turnpike at Mechanicsburg via Fox Hollow.

Upon taking to the summit, McDonald and his men piled boulders at the precipice of Hanging Rocks' cliffs to hurl at Union troops marching on the pike below. The Confederates completed their preparations by daybreak. McDonald instructed his men to be careful not to mistake their returning scouting party for the advancing Union troops.

Shortly after daybreak, Union cavalry (a company of Ringgold Cavalry) crossed the ford on the South Branch at the north end of Hanging Rocks pass and its columns marched onto the pike below the awaiting Confederate militiamen. Initially, the Confederates atop the rocks lay flat trying to ascertain through the fog whether the approaching cavalry was their returning scouting party. The Union troops at the base of Hanging Rocks were naturally suspicious of the strategic location and were on high alert as they crossed the ford and made their way onto the pike. The Union troops noticed heads of the Confederate militiamen peering over the cliffs and fired upon them. The Confederates responded to the firing by hurling the boulders onto the road below causing the Union cavalry to hastily retreat down the pike and across the ford. In their hasty retreat, several of the Union cavalry ran over their infantrymen forcing them into the river, where at least five drowned.

Sergeant H. B. Hedge of the Ringgold Cavalry Company made the following record in his journal about the incident:

On the morning of the 24th, we had our first fight of any real importance, at what is called the Hanging Rocks, eight miles from Romney. Just about daylight we crossed the river, encountered their pickets and drove them back; but to our surprise, their forces were on the rocks overhanging the road, and they opened a heavy fire on us. The Lieutenant Colonel in command of the column gave no orders whatever; all was confusion; we were afraid to go forward, and could not get back, as our teams had come across the river and blocked the narrow passage between the rocks and the stream.

Fortunately for us, the enemy did not know we were so demoralized, and after a few volleys, retreated. Captain Keys kept cool, rallied his men, and after the enemy ceased firing, marched back over the river. Our loss was very slight, as the enemy fired over our heads. Our casualties were mostly in the river among some of the infantrymen, who in attempting to swim to the other shore, came into range of the enemy's fire.

The bodies of approximately a dozen Union soldiers were interred in the sand of the South Branch's western bank following the skirmish. High water the following Saturday September 28 washed additional bodies down the river which were also retrieved from the South Branch and buried.

The Confederates were unaware, because of the earlier fog and the false report of a Union advance, that the Union troops were actually in retreat upon their arrival at Hanging Rocks. The Confederates left Hanging Rocks gap and pulled back to Romney.

== Poetry ==
Hanging Rocks was the inspiration of the poem "The Hanging Rocks" published in John C. Newman's The Harmonies of Creation or The Music of the Morning Stars: To Which are Added, Miscellaneous Poems, on Religious, Moral, and Patriotic Subjects in 1836.

GOD of nature! how tremendous
Does this mass of rocks appear?
How they hang–a work stupendous–
Balanc'd in the yielding air!

What detains them in their bases,
With the pond'rous part above?
Will they not start from their places?
See! their tops begin to move!

Be not frightened;–'tis the motion
Of the clouds beneath the sky;
They are trav'lling to the ocean,
Or to get a fresh supply.

They will bring a wat'ry treasure,
And the face of things renew;
Man, look on these scenes with pleasure;
Rocks and clouds were form'd for you!
