= Cornelia Peake McDonald =

- Born: June 14, 1822; Alexandria, Virginia, US
- Died: January 11, 1909 (aged 86); Louisville, Kentucky, US
- Occupations: Homemaker, mother

Cornelia Peake McDonald (June 14, 1822 – January 11, 1909) was an American diarist who was the author of A Diary with Reminiscences of the War and Refugee Life in the Shenandoah Valley, 1860-1865 in which she recaps her life as a woman living in Winchester, Virginia. Her writing is significant as it recaps the views of the American Civil War from the point of a view of a woman living in one of the most frequently re-occupied towns of the conflict. She became known as one of the "Devil Diarists of Winchester."

Peake was born in 1822 in Alexandria, Virginia. She was the youngest of six children of Dr. Humphrey Peake and Annie Linton Lane. She married Angus William McDonald in 1847 in Hannibal, Missouri. The couple would have nine children.

During the Civil War, her husband was away from Winchester serving as the colonel of the 7th Virginia Cavalry, leaving Cornelia to stay home with the children. (He would die in December 1864, leaving her a widow.) She kept a detailed diary during the Civil War, which was published in 1875, with a second edition in 1934. It was reprinted in 2003.

== Works ==
- A woman's Civil War: a diary, with reminiscences of the war from March 1862 (Madison: University of Wisconsin Press, 1992), ISBN 9780517222140
