= Skirmish at Hanging Rock Pass =

1861 battle of the American Civil War

- Part of the American Civil War
| Date | September 23–25, 1861 |
| Location | Near Hanging Rocks and Romney, West Virginia 39°23′55″N 78°44′27″W |
| Result | Confederate victory |

Belligerents
| USA | CSA |

Commanders and leaders
| Lt-Col. James Cantwell; Capt. John Keys | Col. Angus William McDonald; Maj. Funsten |

Units involved
| 4th Ohio Infantry Regiment; 8th Ohio Infantry Regiment; 3rd West Virginia Infantry Regiment; Ringgold Pennsylvania Cavalry | 114th Virginia Militia; 77th Virginia Militia; Hampshire County Militia; 7th Virginia Cavalry Regiment |

Strength
| 1,200+ | 700+ |

Casualties and losses
| 3 killed 50+ wounded 5 captured | 5+ wounded |

The Skirmish at Hanging Rock Pass, also known as the First Battle of Romney , was a Civil War skirmish fought around Romney, West Virginia from September 23–25, 1861, as part of the operations in the Shenandoah Valley.

== Background ==
On the evening of September 23, 1861, Colonel McDonald received information that Union forces planned an attempt to pass through the gap at Hanging Rocks early the next morning. Upon learning of this, McDonald and his 26 other men of the Hampshire Militia climbed to the top of Hanging Rocks in the early morning of September 24 in preparation for the arrival of Union troops. McDonald also sent a scouting party down the South Branch on the night of September 23.

Hanging Rocks was a strategic location during the American Civil War. Troops traveling between Romney and points north, including Cumberland and Green Spring, naturally utilized the Romney and Cumberland Pike at the base of Hanging Rocks. In addition, the shallow nature of the South Branch at Hanging Rocks created a crossing which allowed for a secondary connection of the Romney and Cumberland Pike to the Northwestern Turnpike at Mechanicsburg via Fox Hollow.

Upon taking to the summit, McDonald and his men piled boulders at the precipice of Hanging Rocks' cliffs to hurl at Union troops marching on the pike below. The Confederates completed their preparations by daybreak. McDonald instructed his men to be careful not to mistake their returning scouting party for the advancing Union troops.

== Skirmish ==
Shortly after daybreak, Union cavalry (a company from the Pennsylvania Ringgold Cavalry) crossed the ford on the South Branch at the north end of Hanging Rocks pass and its columns marched onto the pike below the awaiting Confederate militiamen. Initially, the Confederates atop the rocks lay flat trying to ascertain through the fog whether the approaching cavalry was their returning scouting party.

The Union troops at the base of Hanging Rocks were naturally suspicious of the strategic location and were on high alert as they crossed the ford and made their way onto the pike. The Union troops noticed heads of the Confederate militiamen peering over the cliffs and fired upon them. The Confederates responded to the firing by hurling the boulders onto the road below causing the Union cavalry to hastily retreat down the pike and across the ford. In their hasty retreat, several of the Union cavalry trampled the infantry forcing them into the river, where at least five men drowned.

Sergeant H. B. Hedge of the Ringgold Cavalry made the following record in his journal about the incident:

"On the morning of the 24th, we had our first fight of any real importance, at what is called the Hanging Rocks, eight miles from Romney. Just about daylight we crossed the river, encountered their pickets and drove them back; but to our surprise, their forces were on the rocks overhanging the road, and they opened a heavy fire on us. The Lieutenant Colonel in command of the column gave no orders whatever; all was confusion; we were afraid to go forward, and could not get back, as our teams had come across the river and blocked the narrow passage between the rocks and the stream."

"Fortunately for us, the enemy did not know we were so demoralized, and after a few volleys, retreated. Captain Keys kept cool, rallied his men, and after the enemy ceased firing, marched back over the river. Our loss was very slight, as the enemy fired over our heads. Our casualties were mostly in the river among some of the infantrymen, who in attempting to swim to the other shore, came into range of the enemy's fire."

== Aftermath ==
Following the attack, Union forces retreated and the Confederates remained in control of Romney. Union forces suffered 3 men killed, 50+ wounded, and 5 captured. Confederates suffered light casualties.

On October 24, Union forces returned to the area to drive the Confederates from the town. The column was made up of the 4th Ohio, 5th Ohio, 8th Ohio, 3rd West Virginia, and Ringgold Cavalry. They attack on the 25th and 26th and defeated the defending Confederate militia, occupying Romney until 1862.
