= Wind Lea =

Coordinates: 39°26′15.5″N 78°58′01.0″W

Wind Lea as viewed from the B&O Main Line

Wind Lea was built in 1815 by Edward McCarty and his sons and is the oldest building in Keyser. The structure played an important role during the Civil War when it served both as a prison and a hospital. The home is now divided into private residences.

(Source: Mineral County Chamber of Commerce)
