= Marcus Benjamin =

American editor & chemist (1857–1932)

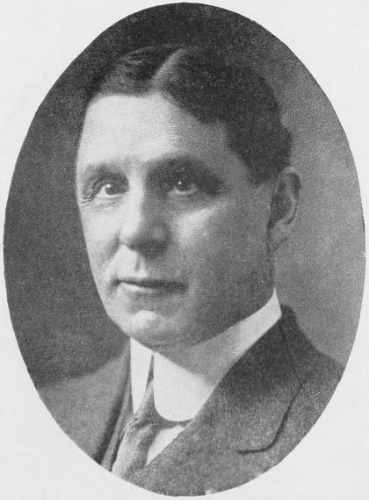
- Born: Marcus Mitchell Benjamin; January 17, 1857; San Francisco, California, US
- Died: October 22, 1932 (aged 75); Washington, D.C., US
- Burial place: Woodlawn Cemetery
- Education: Columbia University School of Mines
- Occupations: Editor, chemist
- Spouse: Carolyn Gilbert (m. 1892)

Marcus Mitchell Benjamin (January 17, 1857 – October 22, 1932) was an American editor.

== Biography ==
Marcus Benjamin was born in San Francisco, California on January 17, 1857. He was educated at the Columbia University School of Mines. After following his profession of chemist for several years, he turned to editorial work.

Benjamin worked on a number of reference works, as:

- Appletons' Cyclopædia of American Biography
- Standard Dictionary
- Universal Cyclopædia
- New International Encyclopædia
- Appleton's New Practical Cyclopædia, (six volumes, 1910).

He married fellow editor Carolyn Gilbert on June 16, 1892.

From 1896, he was the editor of the publications of the United States National Museum. He was an aide in the office of Naval Intelligence during World War I, and received a decoration by France. He was a fellow of the Chemical Society.

He died at his home in Washington, D.C. on October 22, 1932, and was buried at Woodlawn Cemetery in The Bronx.
