= 7th Virginia Cavalry Regiment =

Confederate States Army unit

- Flag of Virginia
- Active: May 1861 to April 1865
- Country: Confederate States of America
- Allegiance: Confederate States Army
- Branch: Cavalry
- Engagements: Skirmish at Hanging Rock Pass; Jackson's Valley Campaign; Battle of Harpers Ferry; Battle of Brandy Station; Gettysburg campaign Valley Campaigns of 1864; Battle of Five Forks

Commanders
- 1st: Angus William McDonald
- 2nd: Turner Ashby
- 3rd: Richard Henry Dulany

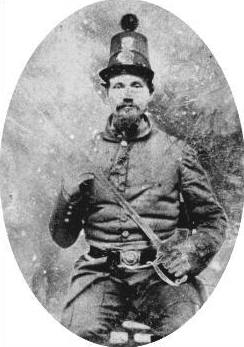
Turner Ashby

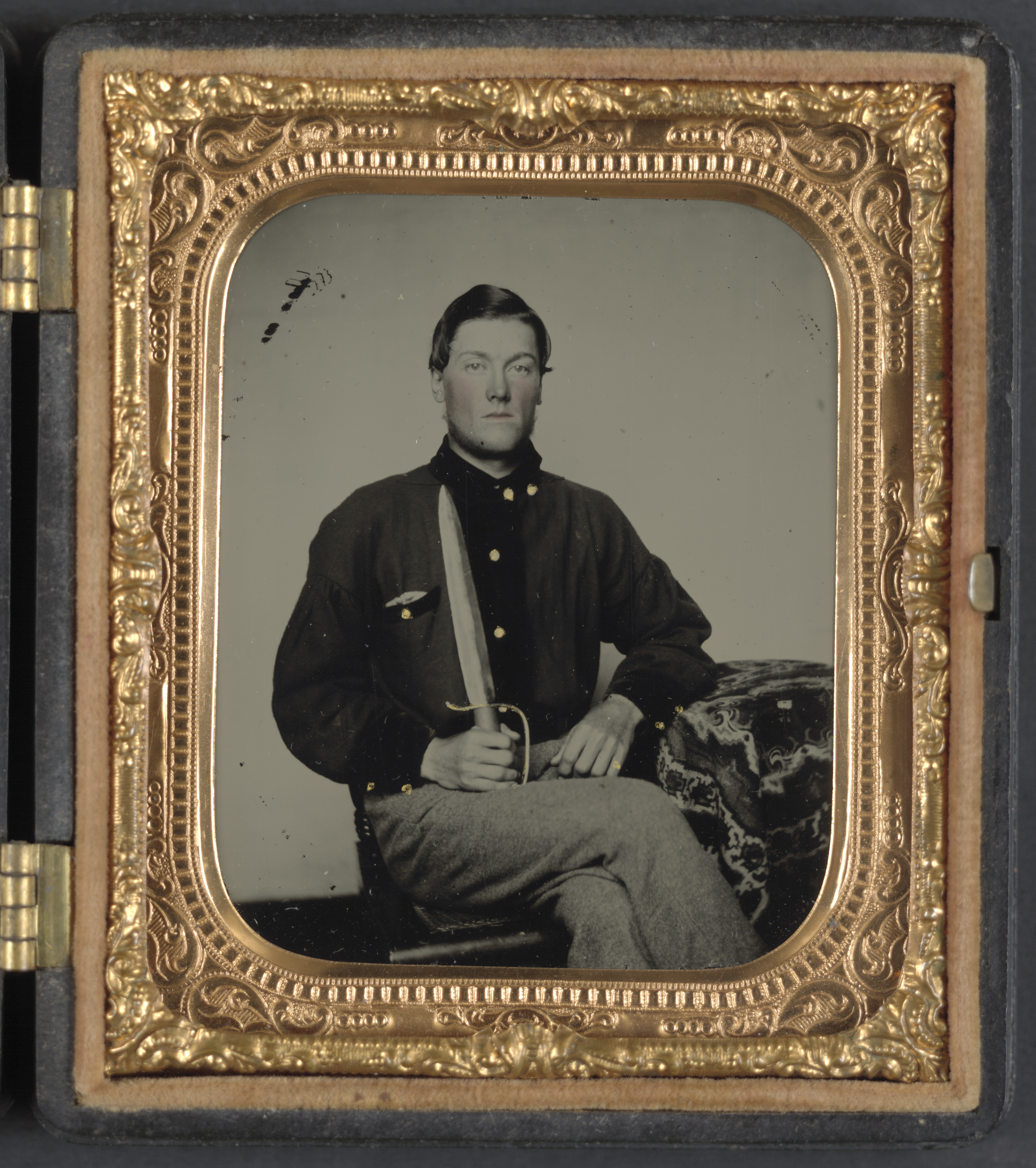
Private David Bowman of Company I, 7th Virginia Cavalry Regiment

The 7th Virginia Cavalry Regiment also known as Ashby's Cavalry was a Confederate cavalry regiment raised in the spring of 1861 by Colonel Angus William McDonald The regiment was composed primarily of men from the counties of the Shenandoah Valley as well as from the counties of Fauquier and Loudoun. Two companies contained men from the border counties of Maryland.

== History ==
The regiment was initially assigned to guarding the upper Potomac and was attached to the command of Thomas "Stonewall" Jackson in the Valley. In the spring of 1862 the regiment took part in Jackson's Valley Campaign, where the exploits of the unit and its commander, Turner Ashby, became famous on both sides of the war. Near the conclusion of the campaign, Ashby was mortally wounded and Col. Richard Henry Dulany took command of the regiment, which had swelled to 29 companies. The regiment was reorganized at the end of the campaign, with the original 10 companies remaining and the excess 19 forming the 12th Regiment and 17th Battalion of Virginia Cavalry. Together with these two regiments, the 7th would become the nucleus of the famed Laurel Brigade.

As part of the brigade, the 7th saw major action during the Gettysburg campaign in 1863 and was at the famed cavalry Battle of Brandy Station that same year. They took part in Jubal A. Early's ill-fated Valley Campaigns of 1864 and were at Appomattox Courthouse, though much of the unit escaped through federal lines and returned home to disband rather than taking parole with the rest of the Army of Northern Virginia.

== Companies ==
- A – Fauquier Mountain Rangers (Fauquier Co.)
- B -
  - (1st) Howard Dragoons (Howard Co., Md.)
  - (2nd) Letcher Brock's Gap Rifles (Rockingham Co.)
- C – Shenandoah Rangers (Shenandoah Co.)
- D – Jordan's Company (Page Co.)
- E – Bowen's Mounted Rangers (Warren Co.)
- F – Hampshire Rifleman (Hampshire Co.)
- G – Mason Rangers (Maryland and Loudoun Co.)
- H -
  - (1st) Brock's Gap Sharpshooters (Rockingham Co.)
  - (2nd) Shoup's Co. (Rockingham Co.)
- I – Shand's Company (Rockingham Co.)
- K – Miller's Company (Shenandoah Co.)

== See also ==
- List of Virginia Civil War units
- List of West Virginia Civil War Confederate units

== Bibliography ==
- Armstrong, Richard L. (1992). 7th Virginia Cavalry. Lynchburg, Virginia: H.E. Howard, Inc. ISBN 1-56190-040-0.
- Avirett, James Battle (1987) [1867]. The Memoirs of General Turner Ashby and His Compeers. Gaithersburg, Maryland: Olde Soldier Books. ISBN 9780942211313.
- Douglas, Henry Kyd (1993) [1940]. I Rode with Stonewall. Marietta, Georgia: R. Bemis Publishing. ISBN 9780891760405.
- McDonald, William Naylor (1907). Washington, Bushrod C. (ed.). A History of the Laurel Brigade (PDF). Baltimore, MD: Mrs, Kate S. McDonald. p. 586. OCLC 1048208291.
