= Eger (disambiguation) =

Eger may refer to:

== Places ==
- Eger, a city in Hungary
  - Eger (Tisza), tributary of the river Tisza
  - Eger wine region
  - Roman Catholic Archdiocese of Eger
- Eger (Balaton), river flowing to Lake Balaton, Hungary
- Eger, German name of Cheb, Czech Republic
  - Eger Graben, region around Cheb/Eger
  - Egerland, another region around Cheb/Eger
- Eger, German name of the Ohře river
- Eger (Wörnitz), river in Baden-Württemberg and in Bavaria, Germany
- 3103 Eger, asteroid Eger, named after the Hungarian city

== People ==
- Adolf Eger (1878–1958), Norwegian barrister
- Akiva Eger (1761–1837), rabbi
- Anton Eger (born 1980), Norwegian/Swedish Jazz drummer
- Conrad Wilhelm Eger (1880–1966), Norwegian businessman
- David Eger (born 1952), American professional golfer
- Edith Eger (1927–2026), Hungarian-American psychologist, and Holocaust survivor
- Elizabeth Eger (born 1971), reader in the Department of English at King's College London
- Günther Eger (born 1964), German bobsledder
- Kent Eger (born 1981), Canadian golfer
- László Éger (born 1977), Hungarian football centre back
- Marcel Eger (born 1983), German former footballer
- Susanna Eger (1640–1713), German cook and cookbook writer
- Eger V. Murphree (1898–1962), American chemist

== Other uses ==
- EGER is the ICAO code of Stronsay Airport

== See also ==
- Egri FC, Eger, Hungary
- Eger-Eszterházy SzSE, handball club in Hungary
- Jack Egers (born 1949) Canadian ice hockey player
- Eiger (disambiguation)
- Eager (disambiguation)
- Egar (disambiguation)
