= Eiger (disambiguation) =

The Eiger is a mountain in Switzerland.

Eiger may also refer to:

- Eiger (Greenland), a mountain in the Halle Range
- Eiger Glacier, on the Eiger, Switzerland
- Eiger (planet), the name of the exoplanet otherwise called HD 130322 b
- Eiger FK, a Norwegian football club
- Suzuki Eiger 400, an all-terrain vehicle
- 5.6x48mm Eiger, a Swiss rifle cartridge used in the W+F Stgw 70 and W+F Stgw 71
- Windows Fundamentals for Legacy PCs, codenamed "Eiger", a Microsoft operating system
- Casimiro Eiger (1909–1987), Polish activist, art critic, gallerist, and diplomat

== See also ==
- 1936 Eiger north face climbing disaster
- Eger (disambiguation)
- Iger
