= Eager =

Eager may refer to:

- Eager (band)
- Eager (horse), (1788 – after 1795), a British Thoroughbred racehorse
- Eager (novel), a children's science-fiction novel written by Helen Fox
- Eager (surname)
- USS Eager (AM-224), an Admirable-class minesweeper built for the United States Navy during World War II

== See also ==
- Eagers
- Eager beaver (disambiguation)
- Eagre, another term for a tidal bore
- Eger (disambiguation)
