= Eager Beaver =

Eager Beaver may refer to:

== Arts and entertainment ==
=== Fictional entities ===
- Eager Beaver, an animal in TV series Ranger Hal 1957–1969
- Eager Beaver, a robot in 1957 novel The Door into Summer
- Harold "Eager" Beaver, in 1957 film Eighteen and Anxious
- Eager Beaver, a club in the 1993 novel Strip Tease and film adaptation

=== Film and television ===
- The Eager Beaver (film), a Warner Bros. cartoon
- "Eager Beaver", a 1962 episode of Lassie
- "Eager Beaver", a 2001 episode of Kingsley's Meadow
- "Eager Beaver", a 2008 episode of My Friends Tigger & Pooh
- "Eager Beaver", a 2012 episode of The Real Housewives of Miami (season 2)

=== Literature ===
- Eager Beaver, a 1963 children's book by Inez Hogan
- Eager Beaver, a 1999 comic by Slab-O-Concrete

=== Music ===
- "Eager Beaver", a 1944 single by Stan Kenton
- "Eager Beaver", a 1951 single by Hoagy Carmichael
- "Eager Beaver", a 1960 single by The Nutty Squirrels
- "Eager Beaver", a song in the 1962 musical No Strings
- "The Eager Beaver", a song on the soundtrack of 1996 film Fargo

== Military ==
- Eager Beavers, a nickname for the 72d USAF helicopter squadron
- Eager Beavers, nickname for the crew of Old 666, a B-17E heavy bomber s/n 41-2666 during World War II
- The Eager Beaver, nickname for a B-17F heavy bomber s/n 42-29816 assigned to the 401st Bombardment Squadron during World War II
- Eager Beaver Air Portable Fork Lift Truck, produced by ROF Nottingham (1969–1973)
- M35 series 2½-ton 6×6 cargo truck, sometimes known as Eager Beaver

== Other uses ==
- Fitz “Eager" Beaver (1922–1992), founder of Seattle newspaper The Facts
- Eager Beaver, a pinball machine, 1965
- Eager Beaver, an achievement level in Beavers (Scouting)

== See also ==
- Eager (disambiguation)
- Beaver (disambiguation)
