= James Dillon Armstrong =

American lawyer, politician, and jurist (1821–1893)

Member of the Virginia Senate from Hampshire, Hardy, and Morgan counties
- In office 1855–1864
- Preceded by: John C. B. Mullin
- Succeeded by: Seat abolished

Judge of the 4th West Virginia Judicial Circuit (Note: From January 1, 1873, to January 1, 1881, including when Armstrong took the bench in 1875, the 4th West Virginia Judicial Circuit consisted of Hampshire, Mineral, Grant, Hardy, and Pendleton counties. On January 1, 1881, the 4th judicial circuit was renumbered as the 12th judicial circuit, covering the same counties.)
- In office 1875–1881
- Preceded by: J. W. F. Allen
- Succeeded by: Thomas I. Stealey

Judge of the 12th West Virginia Judicial Circuit
- In office 1881–1892
- Preceded by: None
- Succeeded by: Robert Wood Dailey Jr.

Personal details
- Born: September 23, 1821 Frankfort, Virginia, U.S. (Note: The post office for Fort Ashby, West Virginia, was established in 1800 as Frankfort, which it was named at the time of Armstrong's birth, and it was subsequently renamed Alaska in 1881 and Fort Ashby in 1932. Fort Ashby was located in the U.S. state of Virginia until West Virginia's creation in 1863, and was located in Hampshire County until the establishment of Mineral County in 1866.)
- Died: September 4, 1893 (aged 71) Romney, West Virginia, U.S.
- Resting place: Indian Mound Cemetery, Romney
- Party: Whig; Democratic
- Spouse: Anne Waterman Foote (m. 1849)
- Relations: William Henry Foote (father-in-law)
- Parents: William Armstrong (father); Elizabeth Ann McCarty (mother)
- Profession: Lawyer, politician, jurist

James Dillon Armstrong (September 23, 1821 – September 4, 1893) was an American lawyer, politician, and jurist who served in the Virginia Senate from 1855 to 1864, and as Judge of the 4th and 12th West Virginia Judicial Circuits from 1875 to 1892.

Armstrong was born in 1821 in Frankfort, Virginia, and was the son of politician William Armstrong. He began practicing law in Romney in 1844 and was elected as Hampshire County Prosecuting Attorney in 1852. Armstrong served in the Virginia Senate, representing Hampshire, Hardy, and Morgan counties, from 1855 until 1864. During the American Civil War, Armstrong served on Hampshire County's committee of safety. In early 1862, Stonewall Jackson appointed Armstrong as his chief of staff in the Confederate States Army; Armstrong accepted this position but Virginia Governor John Letcher and others persuaded him to reconsider and decline Jackson's appointment because his services were required in the Virginia Senate. Following the war, Armstrong applied for a special pardon and received it from President Andrew Johnson.

In 1872, Armstrong represented West Virginia's 10th Senate district in the state's second constitutional convention. In 1875, he was appointed to serve as Judge of the 4th West Virginia Judicial Circuit and he remained on the bench until his resignation in 1892. Armstrong was active in the Presbyterian Church and in 1850, he became a ruling elder in Romney Presbyterian Church. In 1853, he and his father-in-law William Henry Foote organized Mount Hope Church in present-day Keyser, West Virginia. (Note: The post office for Keyser, West Virginia, was first established as Paddytown in 1811; reestablished as Paddy Town in 1852; then renamed New Creek Depot in 1852; then Wind Lea in 1855; then New Creek Station in 1857; and finally Keyser in 1874, when the city was incorporated. Keyser was located within Virginia until the formation of West Virginia in 1863; and it was a part of Hampshire County until the creation of Mineral County in 1866.) In the 1860s, Armstrong was a member of the General Assembly that organized the Presbyterian Church in the United States. Armstrong was one of the reestablishing members of the Romney Literary Society and he served on the Bank of Romney's board of directors when it was established in 1888. Armstriong died in Romney in 1893.

== Early life and education ==
James Dillon Armstrong was born on September 23, 1821, in Frankfort, Virginia. He was the son of politician William Armstrong and his wife Elizabeth Ann McCarty Armstrong. Armstrong's family was Presbyterian and of Scotch-Irish descent. Through his father, Armstrong was a direct descendant of James Armstrong, who participated in the rising of the Covenanters at the Battle of Pentland Hills, forfeited his estate in 1666, and escaped from Annandale, Dumfriesshire, Scotland, to County Down, Ireland. Armstrong's mother was the daughter of Edward McCarty, a Continental Army Colonel who served under George Washington and was present at the Siege of Yorktown during the American Revolutionary War.

At the time of Armstrong's birth in 1821, James's father William Armstrong was operating a hotel in Frankfort, and in 1823, William relocated the family to Romney. William had represented Hampshire County in the Virginia House of Delegates from 1818 to 1820, and represented Virginia's 16th congressional district in the United States House of Representatives from 1825 to 1833.

James Armstrong studied law under Hampshire County Clerk of Court John Baker White in Romney and under Judge Lucas P. Thompson at Staunton Law School in Staunton, Virginia. He was subsequently admitted to the bar in Hampshire County, and in 1844, Armstrong began practicing law in Romney. He continued the practice of law in Romney until he was appointed to the bench in 1875. Armstrong was a law partner of John B. White, son of his law teacher John Baker White, and later had a law practice with Robert Wood Dailey Jr. until Armstrong took the bench in 1875.

== Political career ==
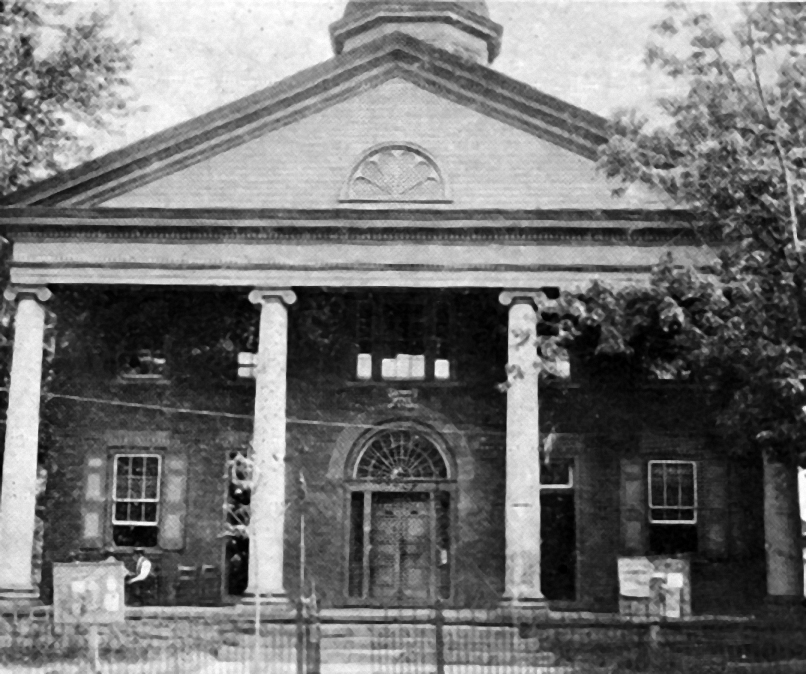
The old Hampshire County Courthouse was in use during Armstrong's tenures as the county's prosecuting attorney and as a circuit court judge

James Armstrong was elected as Hampshire County Prosecuting Attorney in 1852, winning against A. P. White. In April of that year, the Virginia Whig state convention appointed Armstrong to represent Virginia's 10th congressional district as an elector for the 1852 United States presidential election.

In 1855, John C. B. Mullin resigned his seat in the Virginia Senate representing Hampshire, Hardy, and Morgan counties, and Armstrong became a Whig candidate for this seat. Armstrong served in this Virginia Senate seat from the session beginning on December 3, 1855, until the session ending on March 10, 1864. In May 1857, Armstrong was re-elected to the Senate as a Whig, and in May 1859, he was re-elected to the Senate as a Democrat. Armstrong was subsequently re-elected in 1861, and re-elected for his final term in 1863. However, on June 20, 1863, Armstrong's senate district, consisting of Hampshire, Hardy, and Morgan counties, officially became part of the new state of West Virginia.

Following the onset of the American Civil War in April 1861, Armstrong began serving on Hampshire County's committee of safety alongside Isaac Parsons and Angus William McDonald. The committee was established by a meeting of Hampshire County citizens for the purposes of ensuring the public good while the county prepared for armed conflict. The committee continued to meet until May 29, 1861. Hampshire County Court permitted Armstrong and Parsons to execute bonds for and on behalf of the county to raise money to fund "war purposes".

Stonewall Jackson appointed Armstrong as his chief of staff in the Confederate States Army in early 1862. Armstrong accepted this position but Virginia Governor John Letcher and others persuaded him to reconsider and decline Jackson's appointment because his services were required in the Virginia Senate. Following the end of the American Civil War, Armstrong applied for a special pardon and received it from President Andrew Johnson.

In May 1866, during the post-war Reconstruction era, Armstrong, Robert White, J. W. F. Allen, A. W. Kercheval, and Alexander W. Monroe refused to take the test oath before Hampshire County Court, and Armstrong was forbidden to practice law, and denied the right to vote by the Romney township registrar and Hampshire County board of registration. On September 14, 1866, the circuit court at Romney awarded a peremptory writ of mandate requiring the board to register Armstrong without him taking the oath.

On February 23, 1871, the West Virginia Legislature passed an act calling for an election of delegates to a constitutional convention to update the state's 1863 constitution. The election of delegates was held on October 26, 1871, and Armstrong was elected to represent West Virginia's 10th Senate district alongside John T. Peerce. Armstrong participated in the constitutional convention, which assembled in Charleston from January 16, 1872, and lasted until April 9 that year.

== Judicial career ==
In 1872, Armstrong, Robert White, and J. W. F. Allen were candidates for the position of Judge of the 4th West Virginia Judicial Circuit. Armstrong and White withdrew in favor of Allen, but on December 24, 1875, Armstrong was appointed to serve as Judge of the 4th judicial circuit following the death of Allen. In October 1876, Armstrong was elected to serve for the remainder of Allen's unexpired term. In 1880, Armstrong was elected to an eight-year term on the bench beginning on January 1, 1881; at the onset of this term, the 4th judicial circuit was renumbered as the 12th judicial circuit. He ran for re-election against William C. Clayton and was re-elected on November 6, 1888, with 6,203 votes, for an eight-year term starting January 1, 1889. In September 1891 in Keyser, Armstrong became ill as a result of Bright's disease, and the following April, he resigned from the bench, citing his health as the reason for his resignation in a letter dated April 4, 1892, which was published in the Hampshire Review. At that time, he was the longest-serving judge to have presided over Hampshire County. Armstrong was succeeded on the bench by Robert Wood Dailey Jr.

== Personal life ==
=== Presbyterian Church service ===
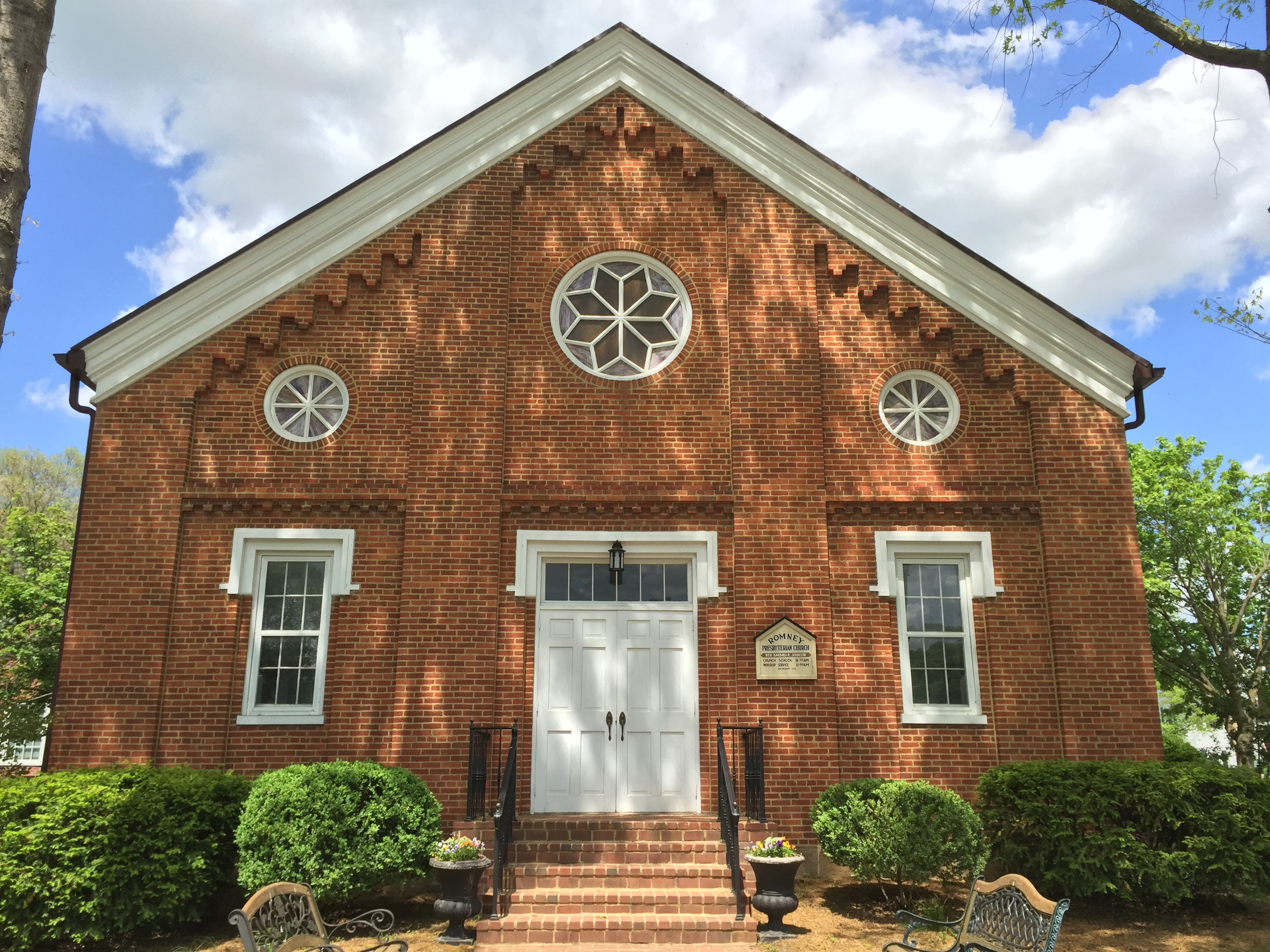
Romney Presbyterian Church, built in 1860, during Armstrong's tenure as a ruling elder

Armstrong was a Presbyterian, and in August 1846, he became a member of Romney Presbyterian Church under the leadership of William Henry Foote. In May 1850, Armstrong became a ruling elder in the Romney church and held this position for over 43 years. In 1853, the Winchester Presbytery appointed Armstrong and his father-in-law Foote to serve as a committee to organize a Presbyterian congregation in New Creek (present-day Keyser), and on December 4, 1853, they organized the Church of Mount Hope there. Armstrong was later involved in the reorganization of the Church of Mount Hope in 1890. As a ruling elder, Armstrong was a member of the December 1861 General Assembly that organized the Presbyterian Church in the United States.

=== Educational, philanthropic, and business pursuits ===
On May 15, 1869, Armstrong was among the members of Romney Literary Society that met to re-establish the society following the American Civil War. In January 1874, Armstrong served as a delegate to the Richmond, Virginia, convention of the Friends of Hampden Sidney College, a private Presbyterian men's college. On August 14, 1877, Armstrong was a founding member and elected president of the Bible Society of the County of Hampshire, which was auxiliary to the American Bible Society. Armstrong was an incorporator and served on the first board of directors of the Bank of Romney, which was chartered in 1888 and went into operation in 1889.

=== Marriage ===
On May 1, 1849, Armstrong married Anne Waterman Foote, the daughter of William Henry Foote and Foote's wife Eliza Wilson Glasse. Anne Foote was born in Woodstock, Virginia, on June 23, 1823; she was involved in the funding and erection of the Confederate Memorial in Romney, and served as treasurer of the Confederate Memorial Association.

== Death ==
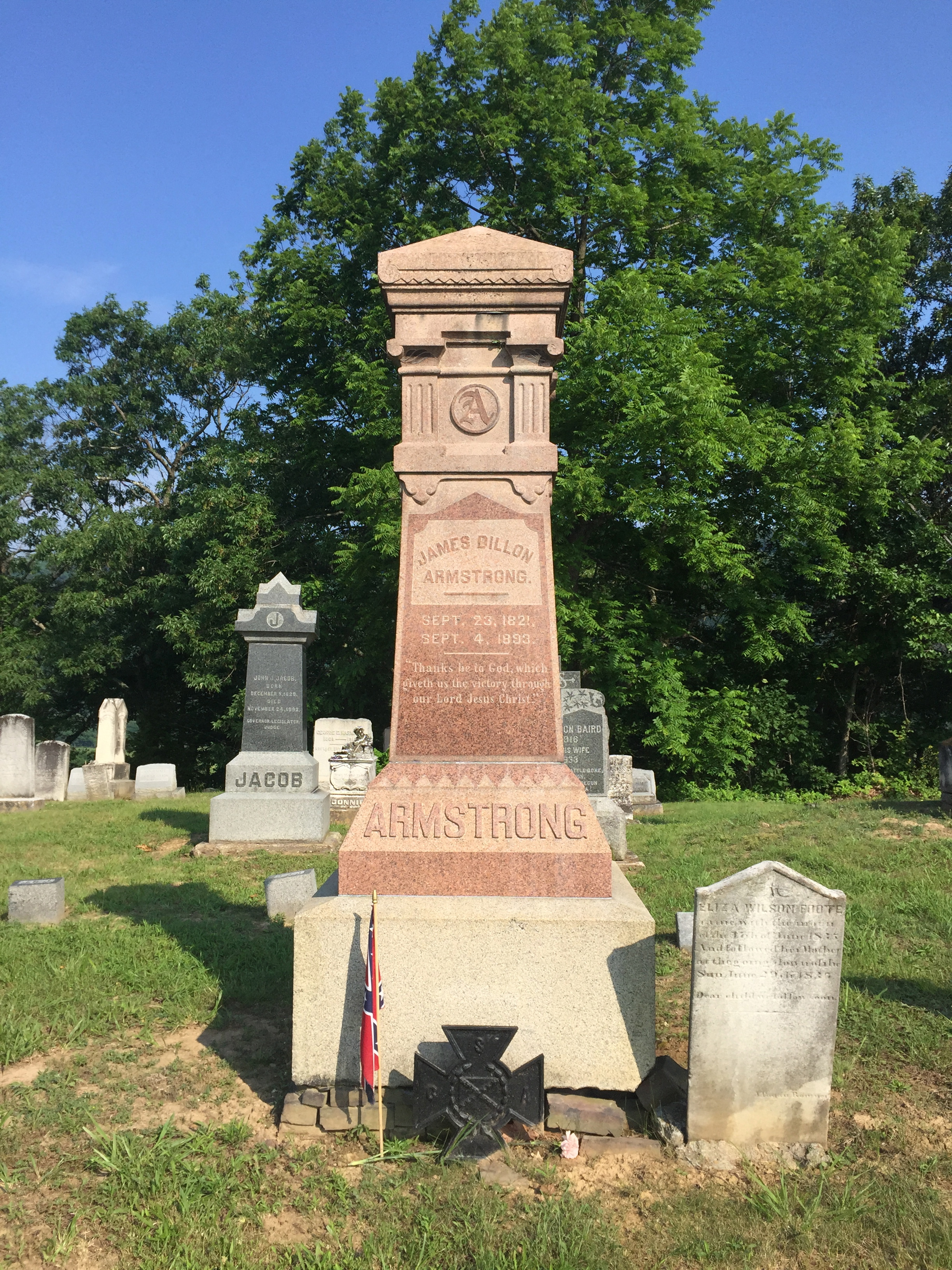
Armstrong's burial monument in Indian Mound Cemetery

James Armstrong became seriously ill on August 27, 1893, and he died at his Romney home the night of September 4, 1893. Armstrong was survived by his wife, who was also in ill health at the time of his death. His funeral was held at Romney Presbyterian Church on September 7, 1893, and he was interred at the town's Indian Mound Cemetery. Armstrong's obituary in the Hampshire Review describes him as "an able lawyer ... an enterprising, liberal citizen, and above all, a high minded Christian gentleman". Armstrong's wife Anne died in Romney on December 26, 1908; she was interred with her husband in Indian Mound Cemetery on December 29, 1908.

== Bibliography ==
- Atkinson, George Wesley; Gibbens, Alvaro Franklin (1890). Prominent Men of West Virginia: Biographical Sketches of Representative Men in Every Honorable Vocation, Including Politics, the Law, Theology, Medicine, Education, Finance, Journalism, Trade, Commerce and Agriculture. Wheeling, West Virginia: W. L. Callin. OCLC 3886825 – via Internet Archive.
- Brannon, Selden W. (1976). Historic Hampshire: A Symposium of Hampshire County and Its People, Past and Present. Parsons, West Virginia: McClain Printing Company. ISBN 978-0-87012-236-1. OCLC 3121468 – via Internet Archive.
- Callahan, James Morton (1923). History of West Virginia, Old and New. Vol. 2. Chicago and New York: American Historical Society. OCLC 373051 – via Internet Archive.
- Lewis, Virgil A., ed. (1908). Second Biennial Report of the Department of Archives and History of the State of West Virginia. Charleston, West Virginia: West Virginia Department of Archives and History. OCLC 300613582 – via Internet Archive.
- Maxwell, Hu; Swisher, Howard Llewellyn (1897). History of Hampshire County, West Virginia From Its Earliest Settlement to the Present. Morgantown, West Virginia: A. Brown Boughner, Printer. OCLC 680931891. OL 23304577M – via Internet Archive.
- McPherson, James M. (1988). Battle Cry of Freedom: The Civil War Era. Oxford; New York: Oxford University Press. ISBN 978-0-19-503863-7.
- Munske, Roberta R.; Kerns, Wilmer L., eds. (2004). Hampshire County, West Virginia, 1754–2004. Romney, West Virginia: The Hampshire County 250th Anniversary Committee. ISBN 978-0-9715738-2-6. OCLC 55983178.
- Parker, Granville (1875). The Formation of the State of West Virginia and Other Incidents of the Late Civil War. Wellsburg, West Virginia: Glass and Son, Book and Job Printers. OCLC 1045542121 – via Internet Archive.
- Presbyterian Church in the Confederate States of America (1861). Minutes of the General Assembly of the Presbyterian Church in the Confederate States of America with an Appendix. Vol. I. Augusta, Georgia: Steam Power Press Chronicle and Sentinel. OCLC 12049303 – via Internet Archive.
- Scotch-Irish Society of America (1894). The Scotch-Irish in America: Proceedings and Addresses of the Sixth Congress. Nashville, Tennessee: Scotch-Irish Society of America; Barbee & Smith, Agents. OCLC 1181187561 – via Internet Archive.
- Waterman, Edgar Francis; Jacobus, Donald Lines (1939). The Waterman Family. Vol. II. New Haven, Connecticut: Edgar Francis Waterman. OCLC 1036916457 – via Internet Archive.
- West Virginia Legislature (1889). Acts of the Legislature of West Virginia at Its Nineteenth Regular Session Commencing January 9, 1889. Charleston, West Virginia: Moses W. Donnally, Public Printer – via Internet Archive.
- West Virginia Legislature (2018). "Section Eleven: Departmental, Statistical & General Information". In Lee Cassis, Clerk of the West Virginia Senate (ed.). West Virginia Blue Book, 2017–2018 (PDF). Charleston, West Virginia: West Virginia Legislature. ISSN 0364-7323. OCLC 1251675.
- Wolfe, William W. (1974). History of Keyser, West Virginia 1737–1913. Keyser, West Virginia: Keyprint, Inc. OCLC 1056129 – via Internet Archive.

Senate of Virginia
Preceded by John C. B. Mullin	Member of the Virginia Senate from Hampshire, Hardy, and Morgan counties 1855–1864	Succeeded by seat abolished
Legal offices
Preceded by J. W. F. Allen	Judge of the 4th West Virginia Judicial Circuit; 1875–1881	Succeeded by Thomas I. Stealey
Preceded by none	Judge of the 12th West Virginia Judicial Circuit; 1881–1892	Succeeded by Robert Wood Dailey Jr.
