= Egar =

Egar is a surname. Notable people with the surname include:

- Colin Egar (1928–2008), Australian Test cricket umpire
- Shuli Egar, American comedian
- Ras Muhamad (born 1982), Indonesian reggae singer (born Muhamad Egar)

== See also ==
- Eager (disambiguation)
- Eger (disambiguation)
- Edgar (disambiguation)
