= Tuwim (surname) =

Tuwim, sometimes anglicized as Tuvim, is a Hebrew language surname which comes from the Hebrew tovim (טובים) meaning "good".

Notable people with this surname include:

- Judith Tuvim, birth name of Judy Holliday (1921–1965), American Jewish actress, comedian, and singer
- Irena Tuwim (1899–1987), Polish-Jewish poet and translator
- Julian Tuwim (1894 – 1953), Polish-Jewish poet
