= Museum of Illusions Philadelphia =

Edutainment museum dedicated to optical illusions

Coordinates: 39.9507°N 75.1481°W

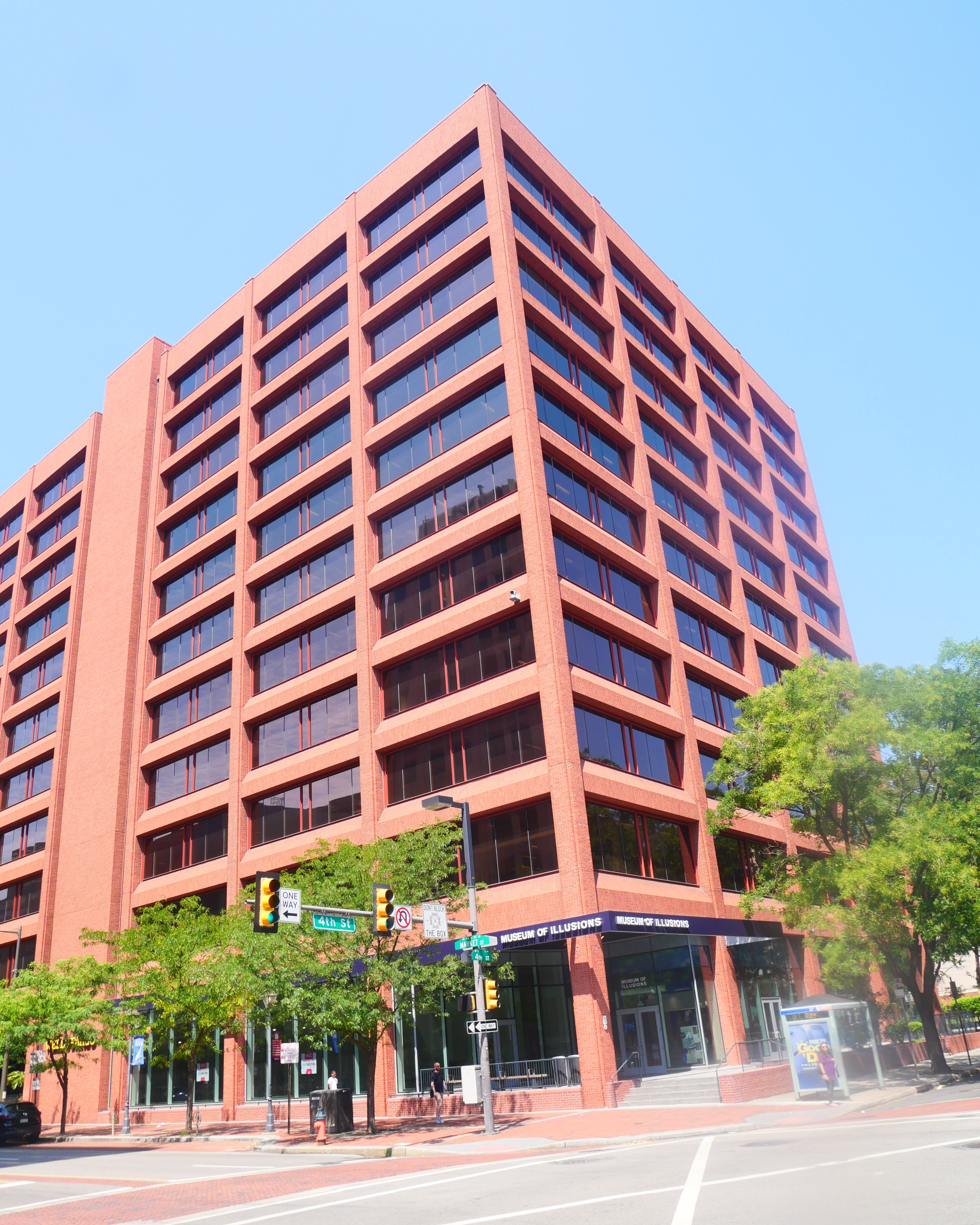
Museum of Illusions in 2023

The Museum of Illusions Philadelphia is an "edutainment" museum in Philadelphia devoted to optical illusions. In was opened in 2022. It occupies space in the same building as the Faith and Liberty Discovery Center.
