= William Henry Foote =

American historian

- Born: December 20, 1794; Colchester, Connecticut
- Died: November 22, 1869 (aged 74); Romney, West Virginia
- Resting place: Indian Mound Cemetery
- Education: Yale University; Princeton Theological Seminary; Hampden–Sydney College
- Occupations: Theologian, historian
- Spouse(s): Eliza Wilson (Glass) Foote; Arabella (Gilliam) Foote
- Children: Ann Waterman Foote; Eliza Wilson Foote; Mary Arabella Foote
- Parent(s): Stephen Foote; Hannah Waterman Foote

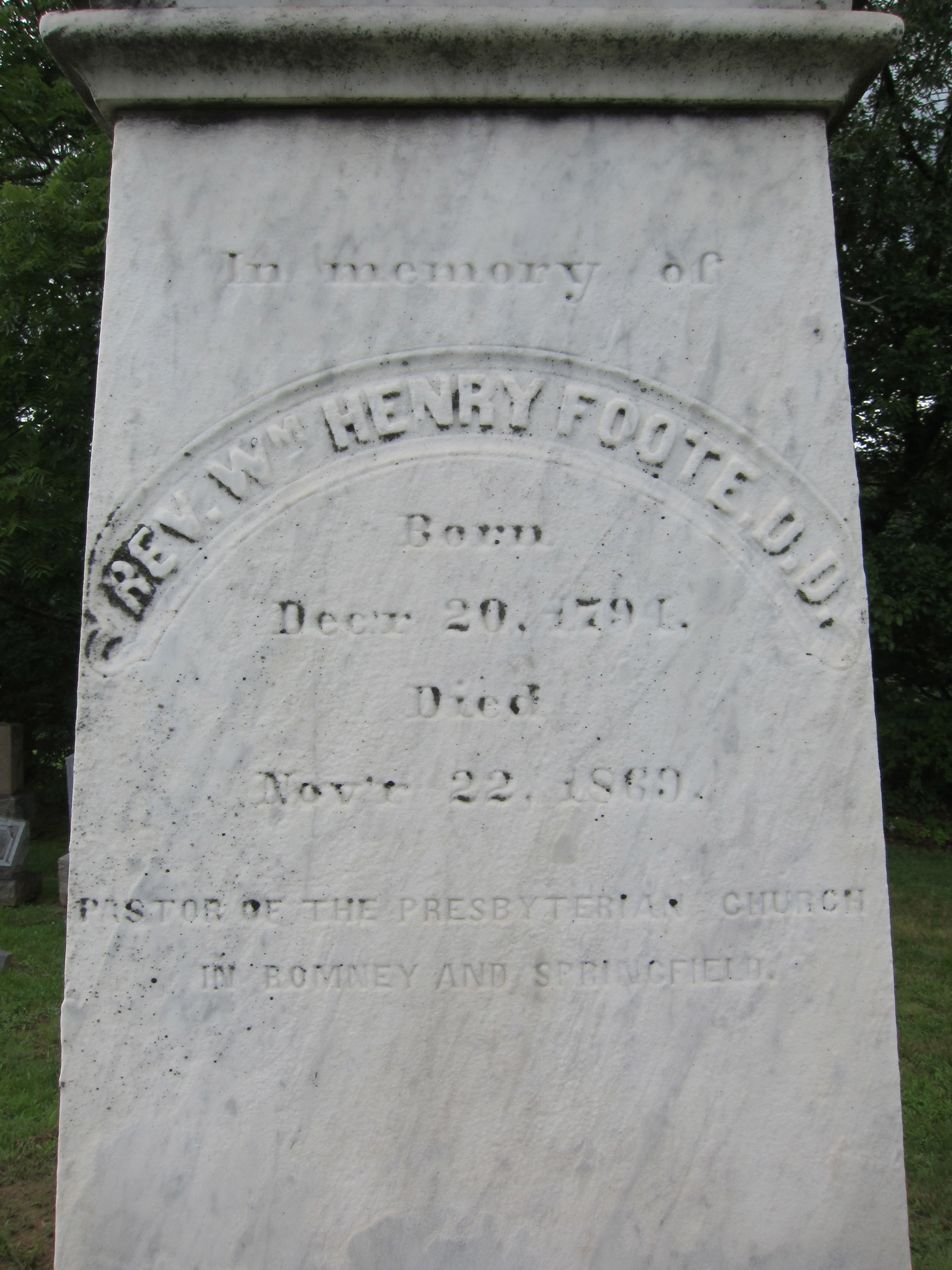
Foote's grave in Indian Mound Cemetery, Romney, West Virginia

William Henry Foote (December 20, 1794 – November 22, 1869) was an American Presbyterian minister in Virginia and North Carolina. He served as a Confederate chaplain during the American Civil War of 1861-1865. He wrote several books about the history of Presbyterians in the American South.

== Early life ==
William Henry Foote was born on December 20, 1794, in Colchester, Connecticut. His father was Stephen Foote and his mother, Hannah Waterman Foote.

He graduated from Yale University in 1816. He then studied at the Princeton Theological Seminary from 1818 to 1819, where he became an ordained Presbyterian minister.

== Career ==
Foote served as a Presbyterian minister in Woodstock, Virginia, from 1822 to 1824. He then preached at Mount Bethel Church until 1833. Meanwhile, he served as the principal of the Romney Academy in Romney, West Virginia, from 1826 to 1838. He also served as the first pastor of Strasburg Presbyterian Church in Strasburg, Virginia.

From 1838 to 1845, Foote served as an agent for the Central Board of Foreign Missions of the Presbyterian Church. He visited many Presbyterian churches in Virginia and North Carolina during that time. From 1845 to the early 1860s, he also preached at the Romney Presbyterian Church in Romney as well as in Springfield and Patterson's Creek.

In 1846, Foote published Sketches of North Carolina, Historical and Biographical, based on his experience. The book starts with a history of the Mecklenburg Declaration of Independence and the War of the Regulation, two catalysts in the secession of the American colonies from Great Britain, and recounts the establishment of a Presbyterian community in Duplin County, North Carolina, by immigrants from Ulster as early as 1736. It goes on to explain the history of Presbyterians in North Carolina until 1845. The book was reprinted posthumously in 1965.

Foote received a Doctorate of Divinity (D.D.) from Hampden–Sydney College (H–SC) in 1847. He served on its Board of Trustees from 1851 to 1870, and Board President from 1864 to 1866. He also served on the Board of Trustees of Union Presbyterian Seminary, then the Theology department at H–SC from 1838 to 1869. While he was at H–SC, he wrote a two-volume history of Presbyterians in Virginia; Sketches of Virginia, Historical and Biographical (1850) and Sketches of Virginia, Historical and Biographical, Second Series (1855).

During the American Civil War of 1861 to 1865, he served as a Presbyterian chaplain in the Confederate States Army. He then returned to preaching in Virginia after the war. In 1869, he also wrote The Huguenots, or Reformed French Church, a history of the Huguenot, descendants of the Reformed Church of France.

== Personal life ==
On February 21, 1822, Foote married Eliza Wilson Glass, the daughter of the Reverend Joseph Glass. They had two daughters:

- Anne Waterman Foote, married to James Dillon Armstrong
- Eliza Wilson Foote.

After his first wife died in April 1835, he married Arabella Gilliam on October 31, 1838. They had a daughter:

- Mary Arabella Foote.

== Death ==
Foote died on November 22, 1869, in Romney, West Virginia. He was buried at the Indian Mound Cemetery in Romney.
