= Stefan Napierski =

Polish author and translator (1899–1940)

- Born: Stefan Marek Eiger; 15 March 1899; Warszawa
- Died: 2 April 1940 (aged 41); Palmiry
- Occupations: Poet, translator, essayist, publisher
- Spouse: Irena Tuwim (in 1922-1935)

Signature
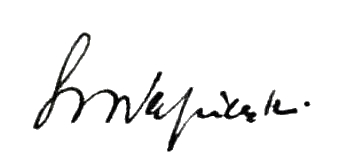

Stefan Napierski, actually Stefan Marek Eiger (born 15 March 1899 in Warsaw, died 2 April 1940 in Palmiry) was a Polish poet of Jewish origin, translator and essayist, in the years 1938–1939 publisher of the bimonthly Ateneum.

== Life ==
Stefan Napierski was born to Bolesław Eiger, a wealthy Jewish entrepreneur and Jadwiga Diana Eiger née Silberstein, daughter of Markus Silberstein. He had an older sister, Maria Eiger-Kamińska (1893-1983), communist activist, deputy member of central committee of Communist Party of Poland (1930–1932), and two younger brothers: Kazimierz and Zdzisław. As a young man, Napierski converted to Roman Catholicism and took a Polish-sounding nom-de-plume. Despite being gay (the fact was an open secret of literary circles), he was married to Irena Tuwim in the years 1922–1935.

Napierski was mostly known as a translator and literary critic, and his self-published works were not as well regarded then. He was associated with literary circles such as Skamander group, despite not strictly belonging to them. In the years 1938–1939 he was a publisher and editor-in-chief of the bimonthly Ateneum. Thanks to Napierski's intercession, Jarosław Iwaszkiewicz was given the position of the secretary of the Marshal of the Sejm.

Following the invasion of Poland, Napierski was arrested by the Germans. Taken from Pawiak prison, he was shot in the Palmiry massacre along a group of significant representatives of the Polish intelligentsia living in Warsaw.

== Selected works ==
- List do przyjaciela (Letter to a Friend) (1928)
- Pusta ulica (Empty Street) (1931)
- Od Baudelaire'a do nadrealistów (From Baudelaire to Surrealists) (1933)
- Rozmowa z cieniem (Talk with a Shadow)(1933)
- Elegie (Elegias) (1937)
- Próby (Trials) (1937)
- translations: 75 poematów, Walt Whitman (75 poems of Walt Whitman); collections Liryka niemiecka i Poeci niemieccy (German Lyrics and German Poets); translations of works by Comte de Lautréamont and Max Jacob; Na Zachodzie bez zmian (All Quiet on the Western Front) (1930)
