= Eager (surname) =

Eager is a surname. Notable people with the surname include:

- Allen Eager (1927–2003), American jazz tenor saxophonist
- Almeron Eager (1838–1902), American farmer, businessman, and politician
- Ben Eager (born 1984), Canadian professional ice hockey player
- Brenda Lee Eager (born 1947), American soul singer, songwriter and musical theatre performer
- Clay Eager (1925–1995), American rockabilly and country music singer
- Edward Eager (1911–1964), American lyricist, playwright, and children's book author
- Helen Eager (born 1952), Australian painter and printmaker
- Kenneth Eager (1929–2013), English sculptor
- Mark Eager (born 1962), English-born conductor and trombonist
- Samuel W. Eager (1789–1860), U.S. Representative from New York
- Vince Eager (born 1940), stage name of Roy Taylor, British pop singer
