= Adolf Eger =

Norwegian businessman

Paul Adolf Arenfeldt Eger (25 April 1878 – 1958) was a Norwegian barrister.

He was born in Kristiania as a son of Nicolai Andresen Eger (1849–1910) and his wife Marie Frimann Dietrichson (1853–1946). He was a brother of C. W. Eger. In 1903 he married Kirsten Stoud Platou (1881–1924), a daughter of barrister Christian Constant Stoud Platou.

He finished his secondary education in 1896, and graduated from the Royal Frederick University with the cand.jur. degree in 1902. After one year as deputy judge in Toten District Court, he became a junior solicitor under his father, in the law firm N. A. Eger in 1903. From 1908 he was a barrister with access to work with Supreme Court cases. His law firm was named Mortensen, Eger og Manner, and was co-located in Kongens gate 18 with his brother's company Elkem. He continued working with law until his death at the age of 80.

He chaired Christiania Spigerverk, Victoria Linoleumfabrik, Den Ankerske Marmorforretning, Oslo Sparebank, and Norsk Musikforlag. He was a board member of Christiania Portland Cementfabrik, Norsk Blikvalseverk, Rødsand Gruber. He chaired the supervisory council of Norsk Sprængstofindustri, Union Co, Hunsfos Fabrikker, and was deputy council chair in Forsikringsselskapet Fram and Forenede Nagle- & Skruefabriker.

Eger became a member of the gentlemen's skiing club SK Fram in 1917, and received lifetime membership in 1952. He was also a member of the gentlemen's club Det Norske Selskab. He died in November 1958.
