= Strasburg Historic District (Strasburg, Virginia) =

Historic district in Virginia, United States

- U.S. National Register of Historic Places
- U.S. Historic district
- Virginia Landmarks Register
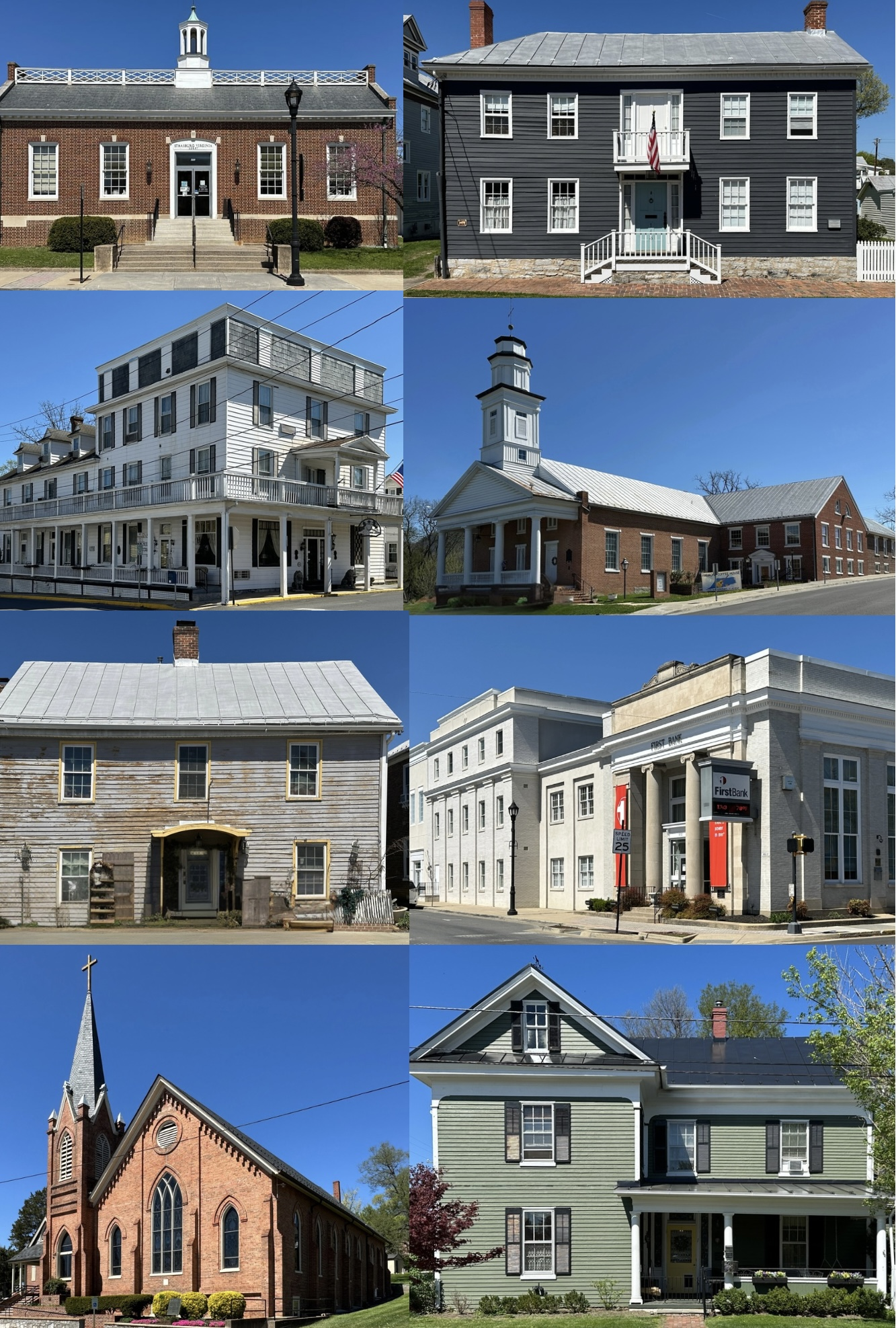
- Strasburg Historic District in 2026 (from left to right) Strasburg Post Office (c. 1936), Balzer Huber House (c. 1766), Hotel Strasburg (c. 1902), Strasburg Presbyterian Church (c. 1830), 178 W. King Street (c. mid-19th century), 100 block of W. King Street (c. early-20th century), St. Paul Lutheran Church (c. 1844), 192 High Street (c. 1868)

- Location within Virginia Location within the United States
- Location: Roughly bounded by RR tracks, 3rd, High, and Massanutten Sts., Strasburg, Virginia
- Coordinates: 38°59′24″N 78°22′20″W
- Area: 130 acres (53 ha)
- Architectural style: Late 19th And 20th Century Revivals, Late Victorian, Federal
- NRHP reference No.: 84003595
- VLR No.: 306-0016

Significant dates
- Added to NRHP: August 16, 1984
- Designated VLR: May 15, 1984

Strasburg Historic District is a national historic district located at Strasburg, Shenandoah County, Virginia. The district encompasses 206 contributing buildings and 1 contributing site in the town of Strasburg. It includes a variety of commercial, residential, and institutional buildings dating from the 18th to 20th centuries. Notable buildings include the George Eberly House, Strasburg Presbyterian Church (c. 1830), Alton House, Spengler Hall (c. 1830), Spengler's Mill (c. 1794), Bell Pottery (c. pre-1878), Strasburg Christian Church, Strasburg Methodist Church (c. 1905), St. Paul Lutheran Church (c. 1844, 1892), First National Bank (c. 1910), Home Theatre (c. 1930s), Strasburg School (c. 1910) and the Sonner House (c. 1757).

It was listed on the National Register of Historic Places in 1984.
