= Park Loggia =

Building in Manhattan, New York

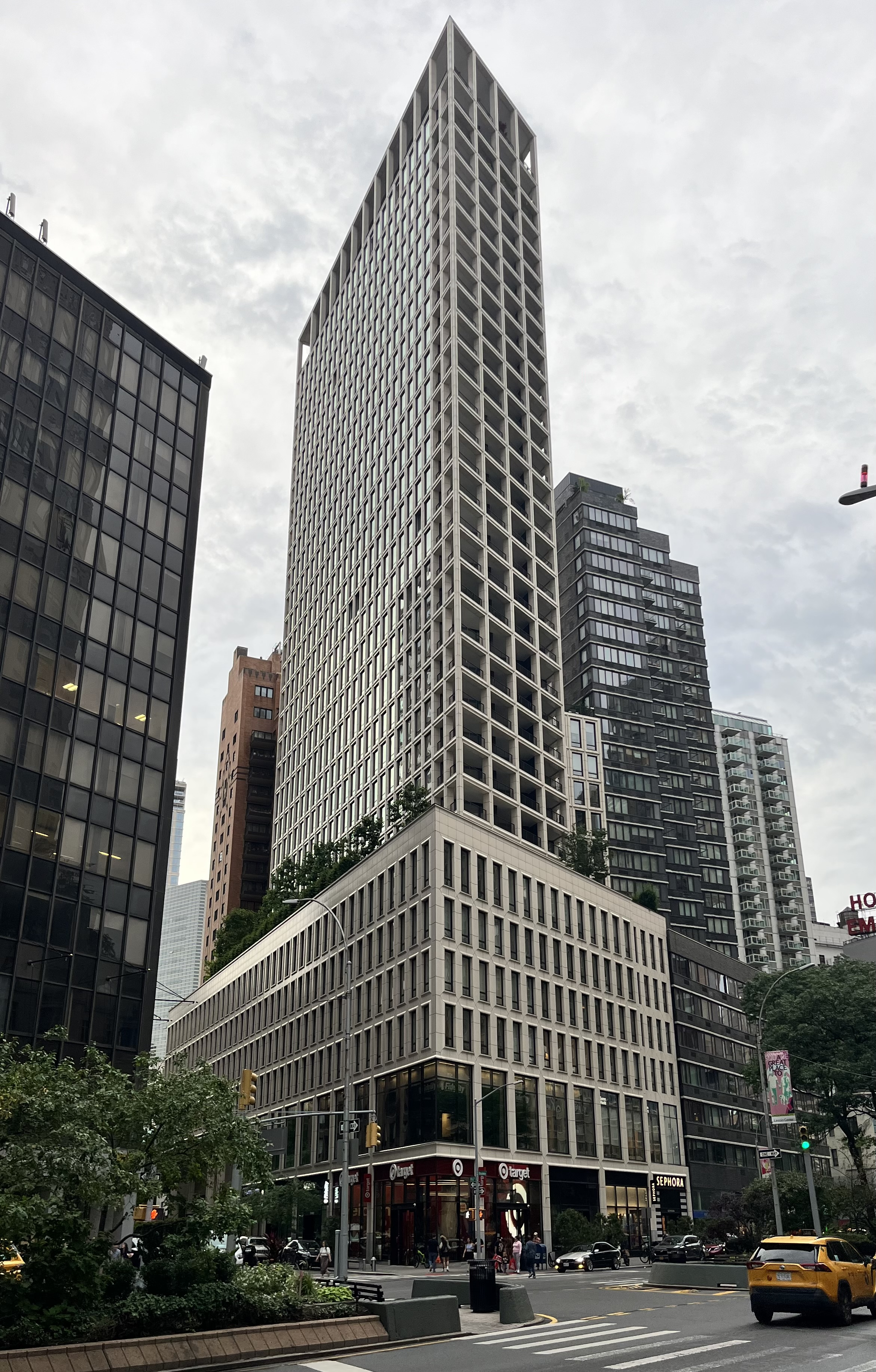
- The Park Loggia in 2026
- Interactive map of the Park Loggia area

General information
- Type: Residential
- Location: New York City, United States
- Coordinates: 40°46′13″N 73°58′57″W
- Completed: 2019

Design and construction
- Architect: Skidmore, Owings, and Merrill

Park Loggia is a building in New York City owned by AvalonBay Communities and designed by architect Skidmore, Owings, and Merrill. It is located on the Lincoln Square neighborhood of Manhattan's Upper West Side, on Broadway between 61st and 62nd Streets. The new structure replaced another SOM-designed building completed in 1965.

== Original building ==
The headquarters of the American Bible Society originally stood on the site. Skidmore, Owings, and Merrill designed the original structure. It incorporated some Biblical symbolism, inspired by its anchor tenant. John Kriskiewicz, a Manhattan-based historian of architecture, referred to the original 1865 Broadway as “structurally expressive” but also expressed that it “might have left the public cold.” The Bible Society placed the building on the market in 2014.

== New structure ==
AvalonBay purchased the building from the Society in 2015 for $300 million, after the organization announced it intended to move its headquarters to Philadelphia. Like the former building, Skidmore, Owings, and Merrill designed the new building. Park Loggia topped out in December 2017. The building will contain mostly residential space, with a mix of apartments for rent and condominiums for sale.

New York YIMBY reported that SOM took inspiration from the facade of I. M. Pei's Brutalist Kips Bay Towers for the design of the new structure. The new structure has a terra cotta facade.
