= Strasburg Presbyterian Church =

Historic church in Shenandoah County, Virginia, United States

- U.S. Historic district – Contributing property
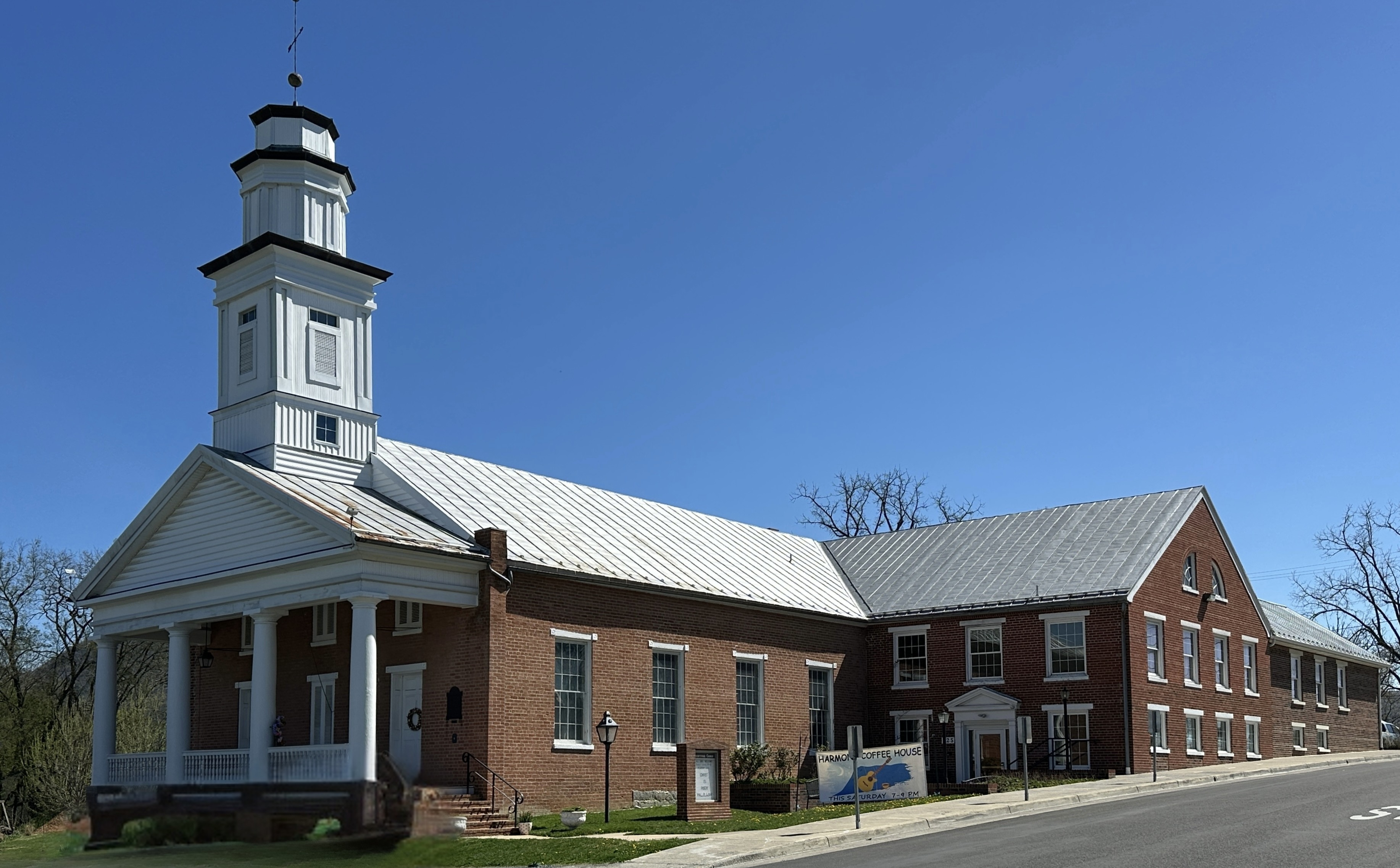
- Strasburg Presbyterian Church in 2026
- Location: 325 South Holliday Street; Strasburg, Virginia, USA
- Coordinates: 38.9867755°N 78.3627828°W
- Built: 1830
- Part of: Strasburg Historic District
- Designated CP: August 16, 1984

Strasburg Presbyterian Church is a historic Presbyterian church in Strasburg, Virginia, US.

== Location ==
The building is located at 325 South Holliday Street. It is a contributing property to the Strasburg Historic District.

== History ==
The church was built in 1830. It is the oldest church in Shenandoah County. It is also the oldest church building still standing in Strasburg. Its first pastor was Reverend William Henry Foote.

During the American Civil War of 1861–1865, the building was used as a hospital for the Confederate States Army and the Union forces. There is an adjacent cemetery which contains Confederate soldier graves.

A school building was added to the church in 1926.

The church building survived a fire in 2011.
