= Helen Fox =

English writer

Helen Fox (born 1962) is an English children's author, educated at Millfield School and New College, Oxford, where she read history and modern languages. Before becoming a full-time writer, Fox worked as a primary school teacher, a marketing executive, and a tour guide; she also trained and worked as an actress.

Her Eager trilogy is about a self-aware robot in a futuristic society.

== Works ==
- Eager (2003)
- Eager's Nephew (2004)
- Eager and the Mermaid (2007)
