= .bible =

Internet top-level domain

.BIBLE
- Introduced: March 8, 2016 (general availability)
- TLD type: Generic top-level domain (gTLD)
- Status: Active
- Registry: .BIBLE TLD Registry
- Sponsor: American Bible Society
- Intended use: Entities wishing to establish "a positive association with the Bible"
- Registration restrictions: Acceptable Use Policy
- Structure: Registrations at second level would be available
- Dispute policies: DCDRP (Rules), UDRP
- Registry website: get.bible

.bible is a delegated top-level domain (TLD), approved by ICANN as a generic TLD (gTLD).

== Usage ==
According to the ICANN application for this TLD, "The goal of the .BIBLE top-level domain is to establish itself as the recognized choice for registrants who want to market and promote themselves and their websites to, and reach, the Internet-using community, for ministry, business, personal or any other purpose, through a positive association with the Bible; and, as the recognized top level domain name for Internet consumers to know which people, businesses, information sources or other online resources associate themselves with the Bible."

== Significance ==
Doug Birdsall, former president of the American Bible Society, described the domain as "the Bible's moment to move from Gutenberg to Google."

== See also ==
- .church
