= Elizabeth Eger =

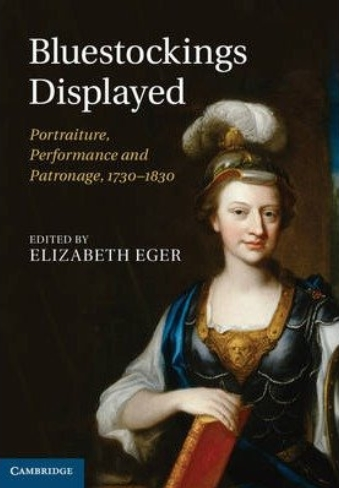
The cover of Bluestockings displayed: Portraiture, performance and patronage, 1730-1830, Cambridge University Press, 2013. Edited by Elizabeth Eger and showing Elizabeth Carter as depicted by John Fayram, c. 1735-41.

Elizabeth Selina Eger (born 1971) is a reader in the Department of English at King's College London. She is a specialist in women's writing of the eighteenth century, the concept of luxury, and the lives of "Bluestocking" women. She initiated and co-curated the exhibition Brilliant Women: 18th-Century Bluestockings which was held at the National Portrait Gallery, London, in 2008.

== Early life ==
Elizabeth Eger was born in the Hammersmith district of London in 1971 to John Cedric Eger, a Swiss national who became a naturalised British citizen in 1976, and Selina Mary Dix Hamilton. She has a sister Helen born in 1973. Eger was educated at James Allen's Girls' School and King's College, University of Cambridge.

== Career ==
Eger completed her PhD at King's College Cambridge, and had research fellowships at the University of Warwick, working on "The Luxury Project", and at the University of Liverpool. She is currently a reader in English at King's College London. Her research interests include women's writing of the eighteenth century, the concept of luxury and the lives of "Bluestocking" women. She initiated and co-curated the exhibition Brilliant Women: 18th-Century Bluestockings which was held at the National Portrait Gallery, London, in 2008 and with Lucy Peltz wrote the accompanying book. In 2014, she appeared on BBC Radio 4's In Our Time to discuss the Bluestockings.

== Personal life ==
Eger is married with two children.

== Selected publications ==
- Women, writing and the public sphere, 1700-1830. Cambridge University Press, Cambridge, 2001. (Joint editor) ISBN 9780521771061
- Luxury in the eighteenth-century: Debates, desires and delectable goods. Palgrave Macmillan, 2003. (Edited with Maxine Berg) ISBN 978-0333963821
- Brilliant women: 18th-Century bluestockings. Yale University Press, New Haven, 2008. (With Lucy Peltz) ISBN 978-0300141030
- Bluestockings: Women of reason from Enlightenment to Romanticism. Palgrave Macmillan, 2010. ISBN 9780230205338
- Bluestockings displayed: Portraiture, performance and patronage, 1730-1830. Cambridge University Press, Cambridge, 2013. (Editor) ISBN 9780521768801
