= American Bible Society =

Christian nonprofit organization

Coordinates: 39.95077°N 75.14801°W

- Formation: 1816
- Type: Nonprofit organization
- Purpose: Bible distribution
- Headquarters: Philadelphia, Pennsylvania, U.S.
- Region served: United States of America
- President & CEO: Dr. Jennifer Holloran
- Website: americanbible.org

American Bible Society is a U.S.-based Christian nonprofit headquartered in Philadelphia, Pennsylvania. As the American member organization of United Bible Societies, it supports global Bible translation, production, distribution, literacy, engagement, ministry, and advocacy efforts. American Bible Society publishes and distributes interconfessional translations of the Christian Bible and provides study aids and other tools to help people engage with it. Founded on May 11, 1816, in New York City, it is best known for its Good News Translation of the Bible, written in the contemporary vernacular. American Bible Society also publishes the Contemporary English Version.

American Bible Society is a member of the United Bible Societies, Forum of Bible Agencies International, Every Tribe Every Nation and not affiliated with any single denomination. With Trinitarian Christian faith that adheres to the Nicene Creed, American Bible Society does not consider Latter-day Saints or Jehovah's Witnesses to be Christians.

After nearly two hundred years across four different headquarters buildings in New York City, the American Bible Society relocated to Philadelphia in 2015.

== History ==
=== 19th century ===
The American Bible Society was founded in 1816 by very prominent American Protestants. The first President was Elias Boudinot. Boudinot had been President of the Continental Congress from 1782 to 1783. John Jay, the first Chief Justice of the United States Supreme Court, was named president in 1821. This led a number of illustrious individuals like Frederick Theodore Frelinghuysen and Edwin Francis Hyde, a former president of the Philharmonic Society of New York, to head up the organization over the years. Francis Scott Key, the writer of the United States' national anthem, was a Vice President of the organization from 1817 until his death in 1843. American Bible Society's first headquarters were on Nassau Street in Lower Manhattan.

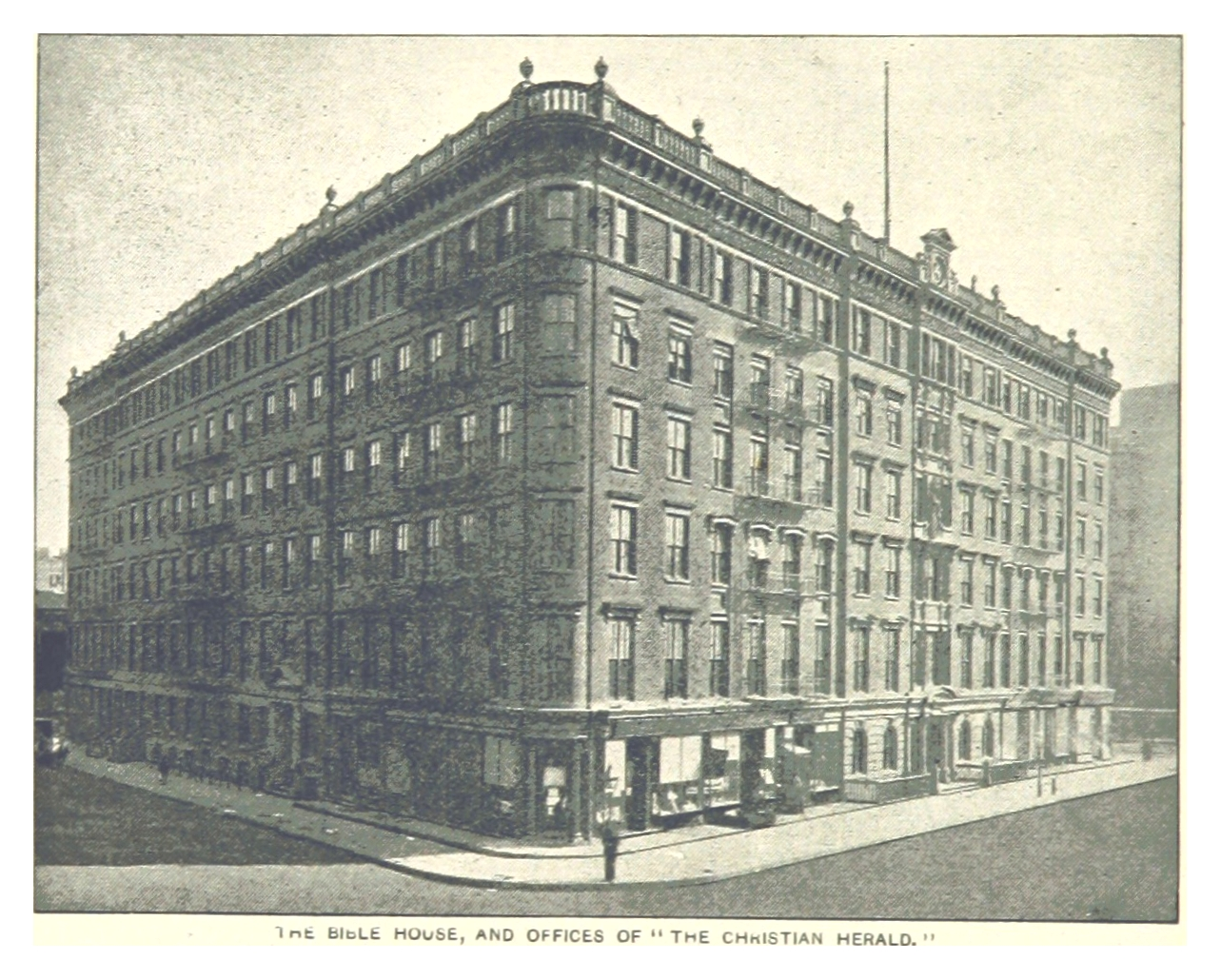
The Bible House and offices of the Christian Herald, built 1853, seen here 1893, demolished 1956

American Bible Society used the King James Bible, and, starting in 1858, appointed committees to prevent textual corruption. The American Bible Society provided the first Bibles in hotels and the first pocket Bibles for soldiers during the American Civil War. The first translation by the American Bible Society was in 1818 into Lenape of Delaware, a Native American language. By the 1830s, American Bible Society sold several English Bibles and Testaments, including a pocket version. The organization owned stereotype plates that allowed it to print Scripture in French, Spanish, and German. It also carried Bibles from other printers in various languages, including Gaelic, Welsh, Dutch, Mohawk, Hawaiian, and Seneca.

American Bible Society began its outreach to the blind in 1835. The organization was a supporter of Samuel Gridley Howe, who developed a raised-letter printing system called “Boston” or “Howe” type. A Bible using Howe’s type was heavily funded and sold by American Bible Society in the first half of the 19th century. By the end of the 19th century, the organization was printing the entire Bible in the New York Point System.

In an incident well publicized at the time, the ABS refused a donation offered in 1834 by the American Anti-Slavery Society. The purpose was to subsidize the distribution of Bibles to American slaves, about one-sixth of the population, as abolitionists believed that knowledge of the Bible hastened the end of slavery. (That the Bible supported slavery was maintained by a number of Southern clergymen.) While it sent Bibles to Liberia for the former slaves there, the ABS left domestic distribution in the hands of its state auxiliaries, who refused to distribute Bibles directly to slaves. The Society was widely seen as insufficiently committed to the abolition of slavery, to the point that the American and Foreign Anti-Slavery Society "decided to throw most of its support behind the American Missionary Society, an organization that it believed was making a 'systematic effort' to get Bibles and tracts to slaves."

In 1852, while Theodore Frelinghuysen was President of American Bible Society, the Bible House was built, occupying the whole of the block bounded by Third and Fourth Avenues, Astor Place, and Ninth Street in New York City. Frelinghuysen gave a speech at a ceremony for the new building. Suffragist and economist Virginia Penny offered an employment office for women in the Bible House, and she gave lectures on the many different types of jobs for women in New York City. By 1920, it was one of the oldest office buildings in the city.

The American Bible Society's mission is to make the Bible available to all people and to that end, during the 19th century, four canvasses of the United States for this purpose were undertaken. These canvasses took place in 1829, 1856, 1866, and in 1882. During the fourth canvass, in 1882, more than 6.3 million families were visited, and 473,806 families were supplied with Bibles; in addition nearly 300,000 individuals received Bibles. American Bible Society sold 437,000 Scriptures and portions in 1898 in China.

=== 20th century ===
By 1912, American Bible Society issued Bibles for use in the United States in 83 languages besides English. Foreign circulation was rising steadily, increasing from 250,000 copies in 1876 to over 2 million copies in 1915. President Woodrow Wilson analogized the society's agents and colporteurs to "shuttles in a great loom that is weaving the spirits of men together." Although American Bible Society continues to publish and print Bibles with partner printing presses, it ceased printing Bibles on printing presses owned by the organization itself in 1922. American Bible Society celebrated a century of service to China in 1934. Vice President John R. Mott recalled that in 1833 American Bible Society sent $3,000 to Elijah Coleman Bridgman, first U.S. Protestant missionary to China, to print scriptures in Chinese. As of 1934 American Bible Society had spent $2,897,383 distributing nearly 70 million volumes of Scripture in China.

The society moved to a new location, 450 Park Avenue near 57th Street, in 1936. Known again as the Bible House, the new, six-story structure was said to better suited for prevalent practices and needs. The teacher and university president William Mather Lewis gave a speech entitled "The Bible and Modern Problems" at the dedication, saying that following scripture was the best way to combat the ongoing threats of fascism and communism.

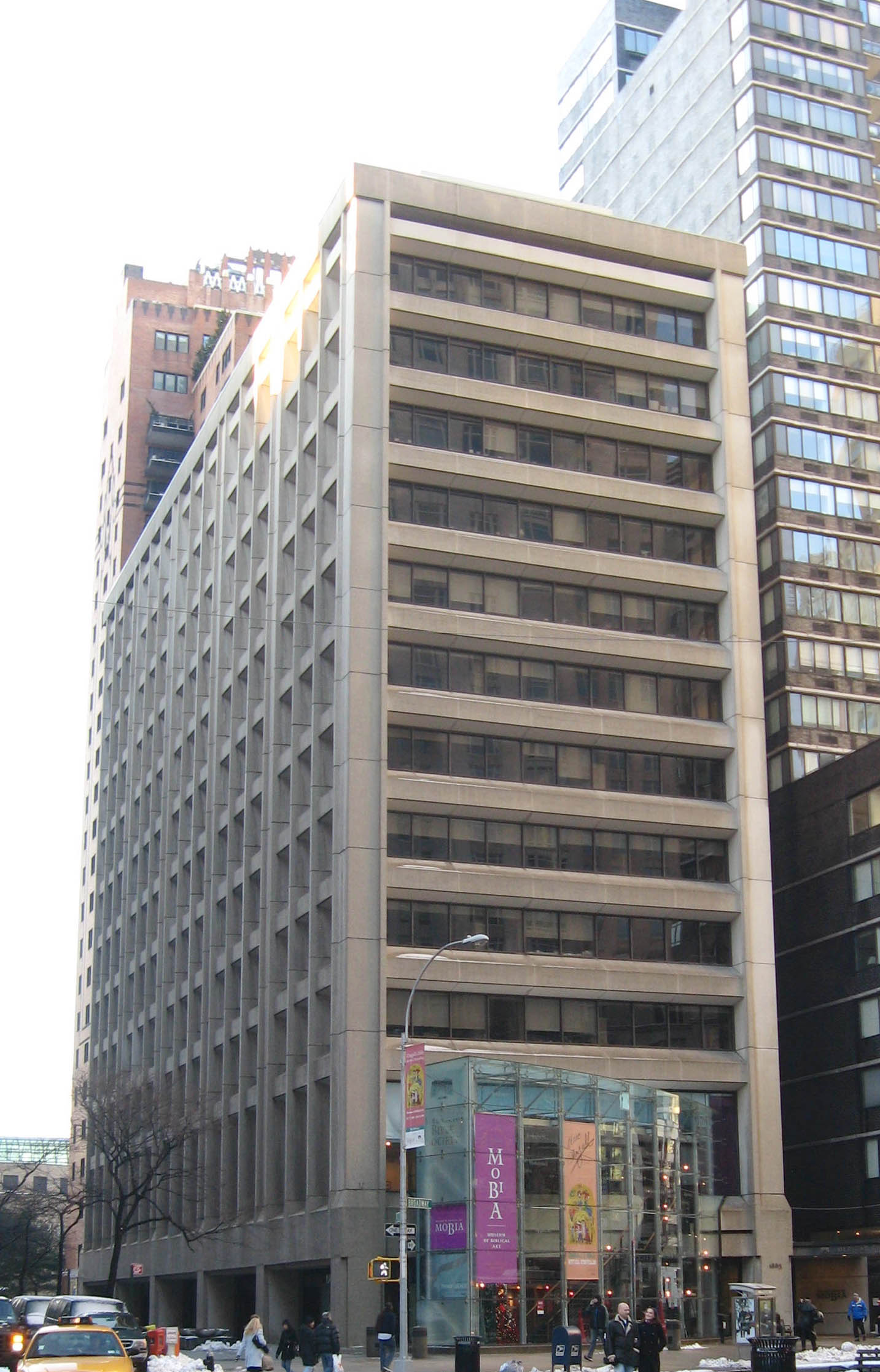
The society's headquarters at 1865 Broadway in New York: opened in 1966, seen here in 2008, vacated in 2015, demolished in 2016

By 1966, however, the society had offices in four additional other buildings around the city. A new structure was completed at 1865 Broadway, near Columbus Circle, and all of the organization's offices were consolidated within it. The 12-story building was designed by Skidmore, Owings & Merrill LLP in a Brutalist style, with structural engineering from Weiskopf & Pickworth. The New York Times was among those who would come to see likely Biblical symbolism in the final product, with visual allusions to Jacob's Ladder, the Twelve Apostles, or the Twelve Tribes of Israel. The building's opening was celebrated in speeches by the popular preacher and writer Ralph Washington Sockman and by Congressman Peter H. B. Frelinghuysen, Jr., a descendant of Theodore Frelinghuysen.

By the early 1970s, the American Bible Society was working on the Spanish Versión Popular translation that was intended to be easy to read, such as when compared to the traditional and established Reina Valera translation. Regardless of the language, bibles had to be proofread before publication. The society usually did proofreading in-house but by the early 1970s were also contracting to a freelance entity, the Tripp Proofreading Service. This was begun by Mildred Tripp of Wantagh, New York, in the 1960s, using methods she had developed at Oxford University Press. She eventually sold the service to Peachtree Publishing Services, which the American Bible Society continues to contract with for proofreading.

In 1998, American Bible Society paid about $1.6 million to Sony Music Entertainment in order to distribute several Christian children's series, including Angel Wings and Kingsley's Meadow. In 1999, the organization launched its first major Internet ministry, ForMinistry.com, a free church web-builder. Operations ceased in 2013 after 14 years of serving over 180,000 churches and ministries.

=== 21st century ===
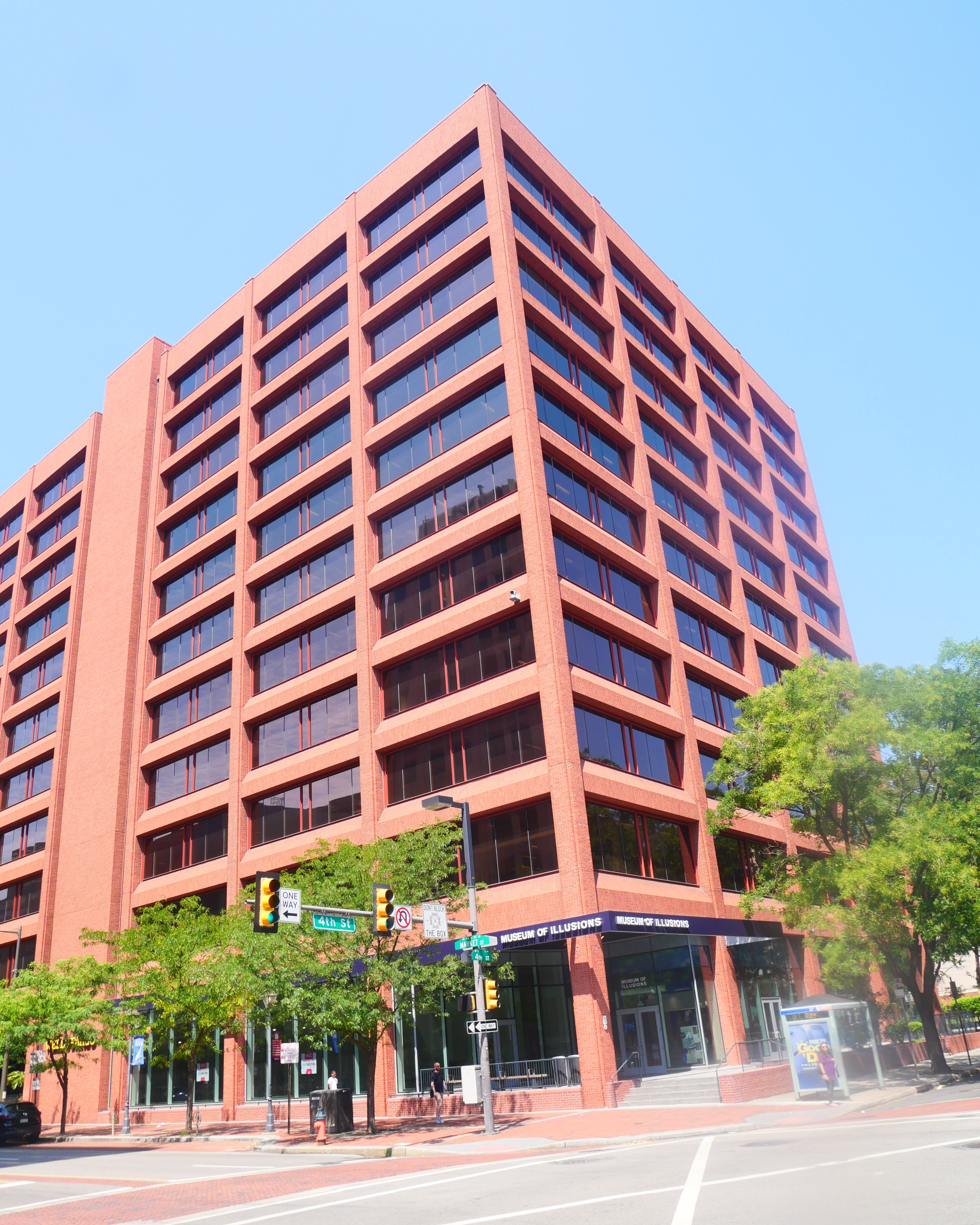
Since 2015, the society has occupied some leased space at 401 Market Street in Philadelphia

In the aftermath of the September 11 attacks, American Bible Society distributed more than one million Scriptures and offered downloadable portions free of charge to those affected by the tragedy. Staff members also volunteered at Ground Zero distributing Scripture Portions to rescue workers. It has also maintained its commitment to the military, including producing a pocket-sized military Bible, developed jointly with the aid of Catholic and Protestant chaplains from all branches of the armed forces. Since 1817, it has distributed almost 60 million free Bible resources to America's armed forces. It also provides Scriptures to victims of natural disasters.

Following the tsunami in 2004, American Bible Society worked in cooperation with the United Bible Societies and partner Bible Societies in Thailand, Indonesia, India and Sri Lanka to provide a host of Bible resources to people in the affected regions. In 2005, it sent nearly a million Bibles and Scripture portions to those who survived the devastation of Hurricane Katrina. American Bible Society formed a partnership with Habitat for Humanity to give a free Bible to each of its new homeowners in the United States.

In 2007, American Bible Society partnered with The Salvation Army to promote literacy with its program Mission: Literacy.

In 2008, American Bible Society published its first polyglot Bible and presented a specially bound copy to Pope Benedict XVI. The text was printed in five languages: Hebrew, Greek, Latin, English and Spanish.

In 2010, American Bible Society launched an annual, nationwide study to survey trends in the U.S. regarding spirituality and Scripture engagement called State of the Bible. American Bible Society launched a new Bible Search tool, an ad-free web engine that searches across ten translations of the Bible and targets the "Bible curious" and Protestant, Catholic and Eastern Orthodox believers. Also in 2010, American Bible Society launched the Bible-based Trauma Healing ministry in a war zone in East Africa.

In 2013, American Bible Society and United Bible Societies launched the Digital Bible Library, a repository that houses digital copies of Bible translations and makes the texts available for repurposing across any media platform. Doug Birdsall was also appointed in 2013 as President and CEO.

In 2014, American Bible Society contracted with ICANN to operate the .BIBLE TLD Registry. The availability of .BIBLE domain names will accelerate global online Bible engagement. The first site to launch was American.Bible in September 2015 In 2014, Roy Peterson succeeded Doug Birdsall, having previously served as President of the Seed Company and Wycliffe Bible Translators.

In 2015, American Bible Society announced that it had sold 1865 Broadway to AvalonBay Communities for US$300 million and was moving to a new location in Philadelphia, leasing 100,000 square feet at 401 Market Street. The society said the Broadway building had needed costly renovations and the cost of business and living in New York had become too much. They additionally said that people arrived in the area for other reasons and "they don't come to New York to learn about our nation's history or the Bible." As it happened there was a historical connection to Philadelphia, as co-founder and initial president Boudinot had been from there. After the move, the organization had about 120 employees in Philadelphia. The sale price was almost thrice the society's yearly budget and the board chair proclaimed, "The sale is a strong mission accelerator." The 1865 Broadway structure was soon demolished and replaced with a high-end residential complex.

In December, 2017, American Bible Society introduced the Affirmation of Biblical Community, an employee policy which requires staff to align around a core set of Christian beliefs and practices. The organization came under criticism as excluding individuals who are homosexual, stating they had to agree that marriage was between one man and one woman, or unwed heterosexuals living together, stating they had to agree not to have sex until they were married. The organization lost 20 percent of its workforce in 2018. Leadership of the organization claims the 20 percent attrition in 2018 was consistent with annual totals, but could not show that the organization suffered a 20% loss in staff in 2017, prior to the new Affirmation policy.

On October 28, 2019, American Bible Society announced the retirement of President Roy Peterson. He had held the role since 2014. Robert Briggs was announced as the Interim President and CEO. On June 23, 2020, Robert L. Briggs was appointed by the Board of Directors as permanent President and CEO.

In 2022, after two years on the job, President Robert Briggs left American Bible Society. Jeff Brown, former board chairman stepped in as interim president. Brown was then replaced in September 2022 by another former board member, David Viehman. Paul Cleckner joined as Interim CEO in 2023, having previously held the role of interim CEO of Women’s Hospital in Baton Rouge, Louisiana. In January 2024, Dr. Jennifer Holloran was introduced as the new president and CEO of American Bible Society. Dr. Holloran had previously served for 22 years in various leadership roles at Wycliffe Bible Translators USA, most recently as chief operating officer.

=== Museums ===
==== Faith and Liberty Discovery Center ====
The Faith and Liberty Discovery Center was a museum that existed on Independence Mall from 2021 to 2024. It said it "explores the relationship between faith and liberty in America from its founding to today, by illuminating the influence of the Bible on individuals in key historical and personal moments."

The project was originally slated to begin construction in Spring of 2017. The Center was completed and opened in 2021.

American Bible Society leadership described the FLDC as “...an exciting experience for people of all faiths and backgrounds,"

In 2019, American Bible Society paid to relocate White Water, a 40-foot-long, 16-foot high masterpiece of geometric stainless steel sculpture of 1978 by Robinson Fredenthal, from 401 Market Street to the Woodmere Art Museum. The piece was commissioned for its location at 401 Market Street by the Philadelphia Redevelopment Authority's Percent for Art Program, which mandated a certain percentage of construction costs for a development involving city-owned property to go toward public art. The Faith and Liberty Discovery Center included a 4-story-high sculpture called the Beacon. The surfaces is said to represent the three documents essential to the founding of the United States: the Declaration of Independence, the U.S. Constitution, and the Bible.

In March 2024, the American Bible Society announced it would close the center.

==== Museum of Biblical Art ====
The Museum of Biblical Art, was an independent but affiliated organization and was housed in American Bible Society's building at 1865 Broadway, in New York. Once the society decamped to Philadelphia, the museum was unable to find new space and closed.

== Rare Scripture Collection ==
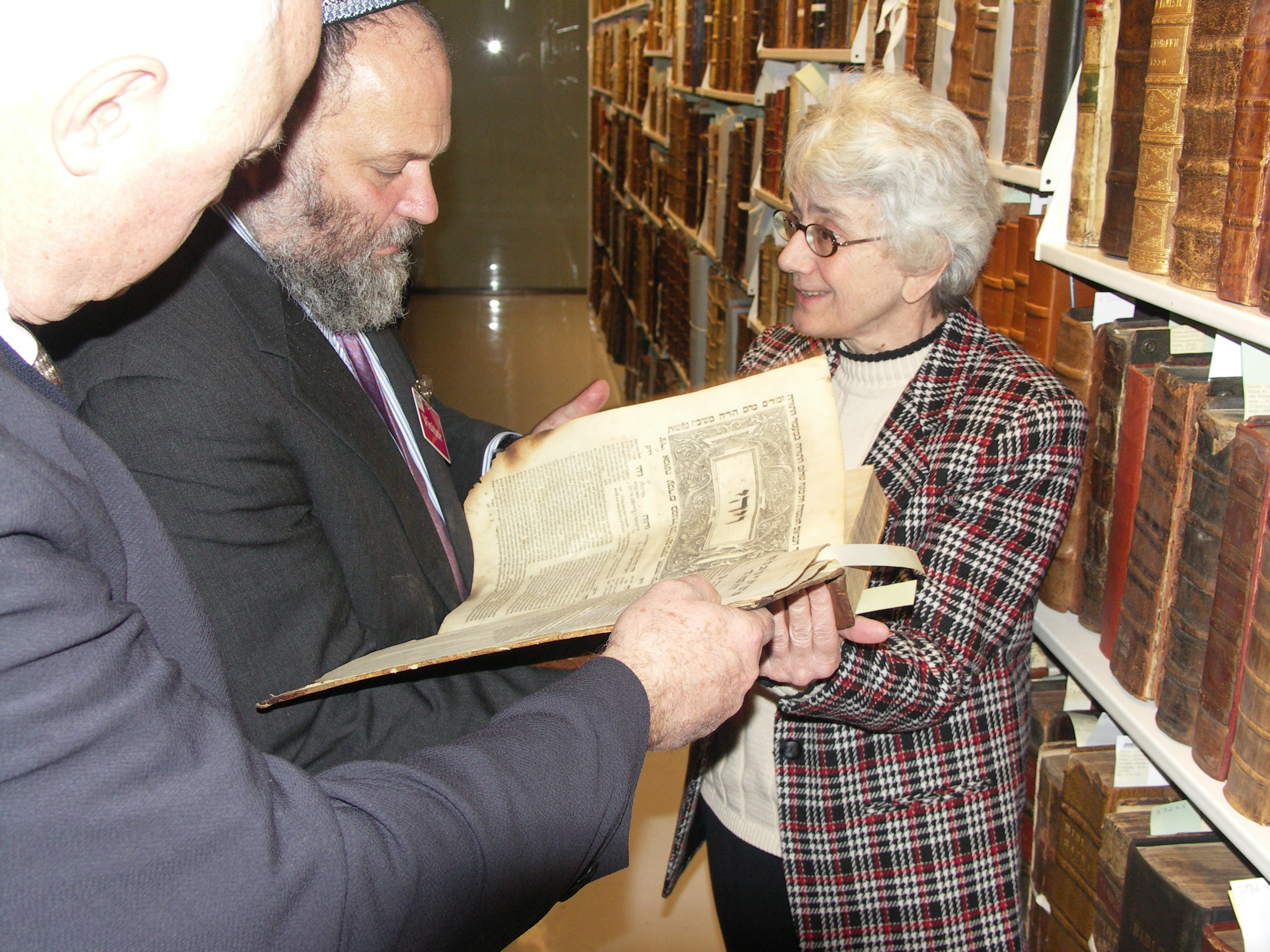
Israel MK Effie Eitam reviewing a 16th-century Hebrew Bible at American Bible Society's Bible Library with Dr. Liana Lupas.

American Bible Society has a Scripture collection over 45,000 volume holdings, one of the largest collection of Bibles in the world including a number of interesting and valuable editions of ancient and historic Bibles dating back as far as the Gutenberg edition, of which American Bible Society has several pages under protection. The collection contains editions of scripture in every language, from many countries and regions and spanning nearly six centuries and is the second largest collection of religious books, with the Vatican's being the largest.

== See also ==
- Bible society
- British and Foreign Bible Society
- List of Protestant missionary societies in China (1807–1953)
- Open Scripture Information Standard
