= USS Eager =

Minesweeper of the United States Navy

History

United States
- Name: USS Eager
- Builder: American Ship Building Company, Lorain, Ohio
- Laid down: 29 December 1943
- Launched: 10 June 1944
- Commissioned: 23 November 1944
- Decommissioned: 27 September 1946
- Reclassified: MSF-224, 7 February 1955
- Stricken: 1 May 1962
- Fate: Transferred to Mexican Navy, 2 October 1962

History

Mexico
- Name: ARM DM-06
- Acquired: 2 October 1962
- Stricken: 1986
- Fate: unknown

General characteristics
- Class & type: Admirable-class minesweeper
- Displacement: 650 long tons (660 t)
- Length: 184 ft 6 in (56.24 m)
- Beam: 33 ft (10 m)
- Draft: 9 ft 9 in (2.97 m)
- Propulsion: 2 × ALCO 539 diesel engines, 1,710 shp (1,280 kW); Farrel-Birmingham single reduction gear; 2 shafts
- Speed: 15 knots (28 km/h)
- Complement: 104
- Armament: 1 × 3"/50 caliber (76 mm) DP gun; 2 × twin Bofors 40 mm guns; 1 × Hedgehog anti-submarine mortar; 2 × Depth charge tracks

Service record
- Part of: U.S. Pacific Fleet (1944–1946); Mexican Navy (1962–1986)
- Operations: Battle of Okinawa
- Awards: 1 Battle star

USS Eager (AM-224) was an Admirable-class minesweeper built for the United States Navy during World War II. She was awarded 1 battle star during service in the Pacific in World War II. She was decommissioned in September 1946 and placed in reserve. While she remained in reserve, Eager was reclassified as MSF-224 in February 1955 but never reactivated. In October 1962, she was sold to the Mexican Navy and renamed ARM DM-06. She was stricken in 1986, but her ultimate fate is not reported in secondary sources.

== U.S. Navy career ==
Eager was launched 10 June 1944 by American Shipbuilding Co., Lorain, Ohio, and commissioned 23 November 1944. Under the command of Lt JG F.A. Fitton, Eager sailed through the Saint Lawrence to outfit at Boston, Massachusetts, and train off the Virginia Capes. She arrived at New London, Connecticut, 15 March 1945, to join the Italian submarine Dandolo which she escorted to Guantánamo Bay, then continued to San Diego, California, arriving 7 April. Underway 23 April, Eager called at Pearl Harbor, Eniwetok, Guam, and Saipan and arrived at Okinawa 10 June escorting a convoy. She escorted ships and patrolled off Okinawa until the war's end, then swept a channel into Jinsen as an avenue for occupation of Korea. She entered Sasebo 10 September for sweeping operations, which included the novel role of supervising Japanese minesweepers.

Eager departed for the United States on 28 December 1945, arriving at San Pedro, California, on 8 February, and went out of commission into reserve 27 September 1946. Eager received one battle star for World War II service.

While she remained in reserve, Eager was reclassified MSF-224 on 7 February 1955. Eager was stricken 1 May 1962 and, on 2 October that year, transferred to Mexico.

== Mexican Navy career ==
The former Eager was acquired by the Mexican Navy in October 1962 and renamed ARM DM-06. She was stricken in 1986, but her ultimate fate is not reported in secondary sources.
