= Kingsley's Meadow =

Christian children's video series

- VHS cover of the episode, "Hang in There!"
- Genre: Children; Comedy; Christianity
- Created by: Tony Salerno
- Country of origin: United States
- Original language: English
- No. of episodes: 26

Production
- Executive producer: Walt Kubiak
- Running time: 30 minutes
- Production company: American Bible Society

Original release
- Network: Kids & Teens TV
- Release: February 15, 1999 – February 10, 2003

Kingsley's Meadow is a Christian children's direct-to-video series that ran from 1999 to 2003. The series was about a teenage lion named Kingsley who, with his friends, learn the virtues and values of the Bible. The series also featured live-action footage of children reenacting stories from the Bible. The series was created by Tony Salerno.

== Production ==
In 1998, alongside Angel Wings, American Bible Society paid about $1.6 million to Sony Music Entertainment in order to distribute the series. The Biblical passages and songs used in the series were based on the Contemporary English Version, which was previously published by the American Bible Society themselves.

== Characters ==
- Kingsley - a teenage lion who tells his Meadow friends the stories his father taught him when he was younger. He serves as the host of the series.
- Aaron - a hedgehog who is honest and does whatever his mother tells him to.
- Birdtha - a songbird who loves to sing and gossip.
- Bryron - an elephant who delivers packages for the "Pachyderm Postal Service" (PPS).
- Monk - a chipmunk who serves as the best friend of Kingsley.
- Singing Flowers - the three flowers who appear in the series.

== Episodes ==
=== Season 1 (1999–2001) ===
- Hang in There! - The Story of Ruth: Goodness and The Story of Elisha: Perseverance (July 1, 1999)
- Wise Guy - The Story of David and Solomon: Attentiveness and The Story of Naaman: Self-Control (July 1, 1999)
- Munch, Munch, Where's My Lunch? - The Story of Hannah: Thankfulness and The Story of Moses: Patience (July 1, 1999)
- Funny Money - The Story of Daniel: Contentment and The Story of Jonah: Obedience (July 1, 1999)
- 1-2-3, Count on Me - The Story of Joseph: Forgiveness and The Story of Abraham: Responsibility (June 26, 2000)
- Just the Facts, Mac - The Story of Samuel: Truthfulness and The Story of David and Saul: Respect (June 26, 2000)
- Eager Beaver - The Story of Joshua: Diligence and The Story of Jacob: Honesty (January 15, 2001)

=== Season 2 (2002–2003) ===
- Flash! Boom! Bam! - The Story of Esther: Courage and The Story of Jonathan and David: Friendship (February 11, 2002)
- Heart of Gold - The Story of Noah: Dependability and The Story of Abraham and Lot: Generosity (March 18, 2002)
- The Golden Trust Award - The Story of Gideon: Cautiousness and The Story of Caleb: Trustworthiness (September 26, 2002)
- Spread a Little Kindness - The Story of Rahab: Kindness and The Story of Nehemiah: Industriousness (September 26, 2002)
- Share the Love - The Story of Elijah: Sharing and The Story of Nebuchadnezzar: Love (February 10, 2003)
- Faithful Friends are Forever - The Story of Shadrach, Meshach, and Abednego: Faithfulness and The Story of Solomon: Wisdom (February 10, 2003)

== Voice cast ==
- Ray Massa as Kingsley the Lion

== Reception ==
The series was given a positive review by The Dove Foundation, stating that the show "promises a fun and enjoyable time for your child as they learn the moral values taught in each story".
