= Eager (novel) =

2003 novel by Helen Fox

EAGER
- Cover of first paperback edition 2004
- Author: Helen Fox
- Cover artist: Adam Willis
- Language: English
- Genre: Science fiction Children's literature
- Publisher: Hodder Children's Books
- Publication date: 2003
- Media type: Print
- Pages: 297
- ISBN: 0-340-87583-6
- OCLC: 56462603

Eager is a children's science-fiction novel written by Helen Fox, and first published in 2003. Eager is the name of a self-aware robot in a futuristic society controlled by a company called LifeCorp. Eager was shortlisted for the West Sussex Children's Book Award 2005–2006.

== Plot summary ==
The plot is set in Britain at the end of the 21st Century and revolves around an experimental type of robot that can think for itself, EGR3 (called Eager). Eager learns by experience as a human would, is intellectually curious, and capable of emotion. He can feel wonder, excitement, and loss. His inventor sends him as an assistant to an old-fashioned robot, Grumps, who acts as a butler to the Bell family. Though much-loved, Grumps is running down and can no longer be repaired.

Mr. Bell works for the technocratic corporation, Life Corp, which supplies the robots that cater to every human need. His children, Gavin and Fleur, learn of an underground group that opposes Life Corp and the danger of a robot rebellion brewing. The ultra-high-tech, eerily human BDC4 robots are behaving suspiciously, and the Bell children and Eager are drawn into an adventure. Eager's abilities are tested to the limit, and he tries to find the answer to the question: what does it mean to be alive?

== Themes ==
Questions of where technology may be heading, what constitutes life and death, and the morality of creating self-aware machines to serve, or sometimes replace, humans are raised. Eager is the first of three novels.

== Reception ==
Kirkus Reviews describe Eager as "The Jetsons in a lightweight dystopia." but also "While Eager’s adventure isn’t thrilling, his discoveries about life, formed through amusing conversations with virtual reality Socrates, are thought-provoking." A review posted to The Guardian called it "A very funny book and at one point a lesson in paranoia against technology."

== Sequels ==
Two sequels were published; Eager's Nephew (2005) and Eager and the Mermaid (2007).
