= Helen Eager =

Australian artist (born 1952)

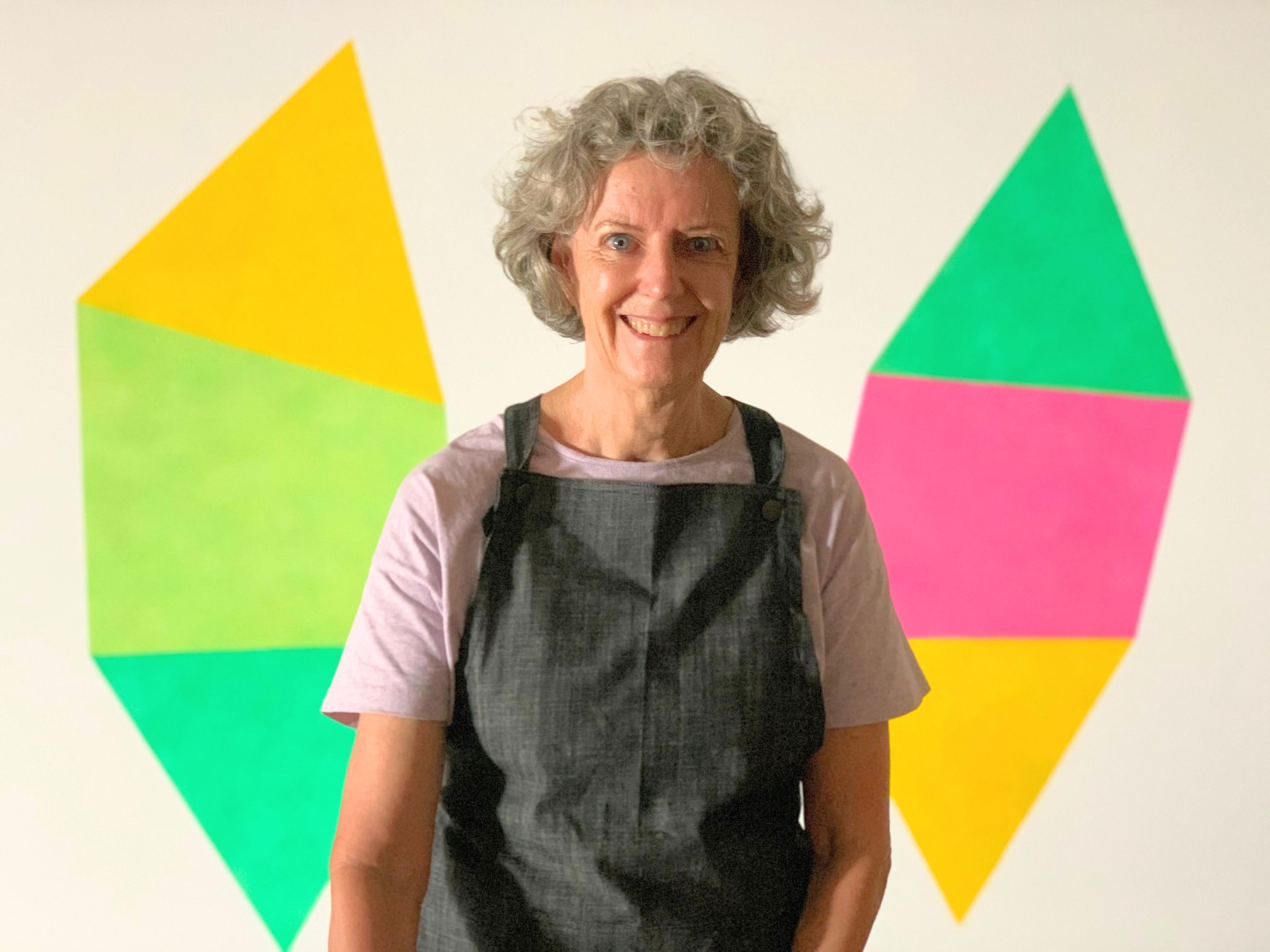
Helen Eager in the studio 2020

Helen Eager (born 27 September 1952, Sydney, Australia) is an Australian artist with an exhibition history of over 40 years. Her work 'Tango' was selected for the Inaugural Circular Quay Foyer Wall Commission at the Museum of Contemporary Art Australia (MCA), Sydney in 2011. An initial temporary site-specific commission, 'Tango' is now permanently on display in a new location at MCA. Eager's paintings, works on paper, video's and prints are held in national and state collections, including the National Gallery of Australia, Art Gallery of NSW, National Gallery of Victoria and the Art Gallery of South Australia.

== Education ==
Eager first studied art at the South Australian School or Arts in Adelaide from 1972 to 1975. Accepting a Visual Arts Board Grant for study in Europe and United States; she studied at Kala Art Institute, from 1981 to 1982. She completed her Masters of Visual Arts at College of Fine Art, New South Wales in 1990, and an artist residency at the Greene Street Studio, New York, in 1988.

== Early work ==
Eager first became known for her paintings of familiar objects such as chairs, tea cups and vases. Manipulating color and light, "her art makes us more responsive to, and even wary of, otherwise benign interiors."

From 1988 Eager work leaned more and more to abstraction. Her compositions explore links between shapes. For ten years those shapes were triangles, although the shapes are currently multi-sided. The interplay between color and light recurs in Eager's abstract work. Her 2021 survey of 40 years of drawing articulated these developments.

== Exhibitions ==
Eager held solo exhibitions at Sydney's Watters Gallery between 1977 and 1991 and Utopia Art Sydney from 2009. Other solo exhibitions were held in Brisbane, Melbourne, and Adelaide. She has been the subject of 33 solo exhibitions and been included in 146 group or multi-artist exhibitions.

Eager was represented by Watters Gallery in the early part of her career. Since 2009 she has been represented by Utopia Art Sydney. Eager will hold an exhibition of work with Utopia Art Sydney in September and October 2024.

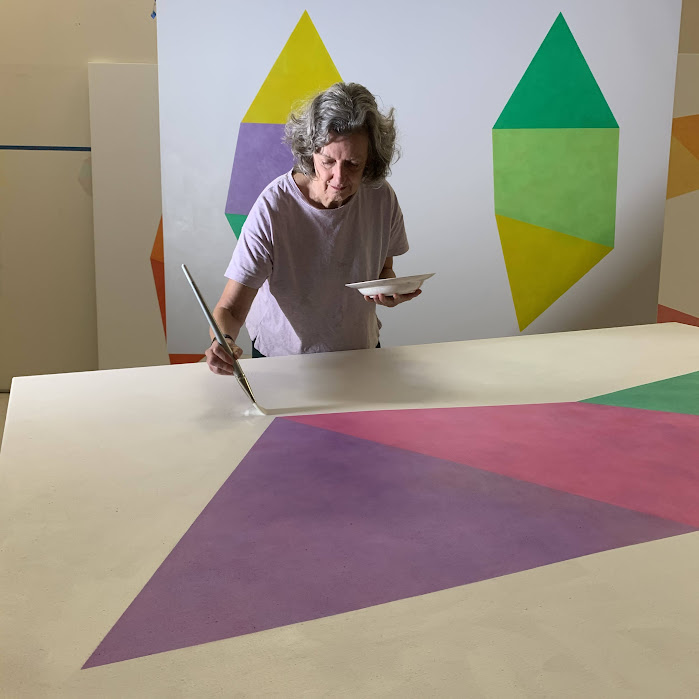
Eager in her studio painting.

As a print-maker and painter, Eager has participated in numerous group exhibitions, including the Tokyo Print Biennale, Japan, 1979, and Sydney Contemporary, 2019, Carriageworks, Sydney.

Eager is one of ten artists participating in the Dobell Drawing Biennial 2024 at the AGNSW New England Regional Art Gallery. It will hold a career survey exhibition in October 2024

== Vivid 2022 ==
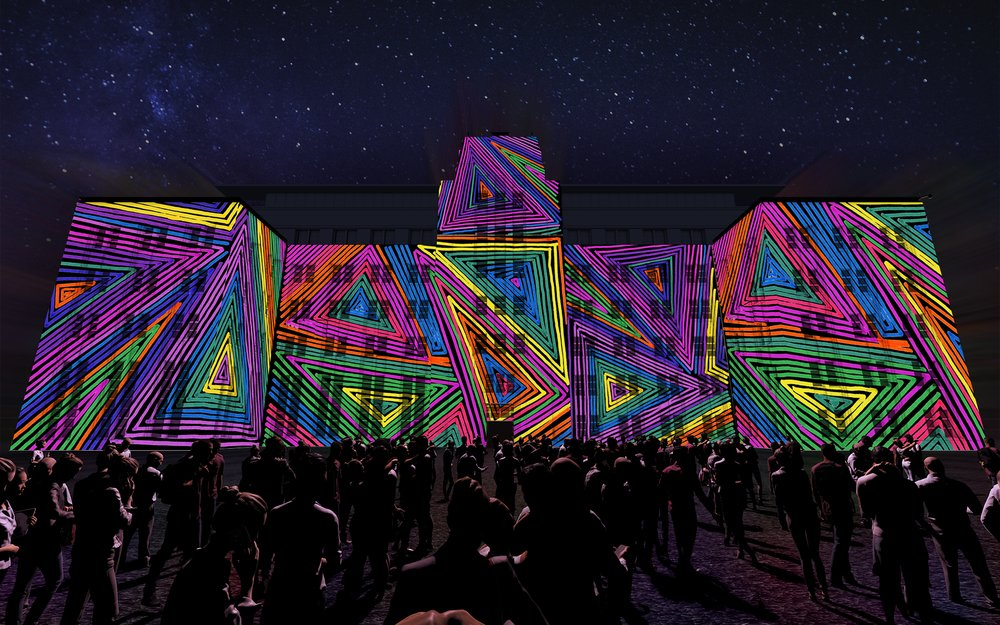
The Vivid crowd looks at New York Sunday during Vivid 2022

Eager was announced as creating a light work to be projected onto the Museum of Contemporary Art as a centerpiece of the Vivid 2021 Light Festival. Due to the Covid pandemic, Vivid was postponed from 2021 until 2022, opening May 27. The work New York Sunday was an 8.30 min long, constantly changing and morphing representation of Eager's career, accompanied by the electronic music of Peter Mac. It was described as "a sure crowd pleaser" and "one of the highlights of the Festival"

== Media ==
Eager was profiled in Art Collector and Artist Profile magazines in 2021. Her work from "Intersections" was used on the cover of Art Almanac in 2015

== Critical Response ==
According to John McDonald, art critic of the Sydney Morning Herald writing in the 2018 Good Weekend "there's no reason to hesitate" when considering acquiring an Eager work.
