= Ranger Hal =

1960's Children's TV Show

Ranger Hal was a children's television program that originated in Washington, DC, on WTOP-TV Channel 9 (now WUSA), a station owned by The Washington Post newspaper. It aired from 1957 to 1969 in a weekday and Saturday morning timeslot. It was hosted by Hal Shaw (1925–1999), a local television personality who created and produced the show.

The title character, Ranger Hal, is a fictional US Forest Service Ranger who was assigned to a national forest. He befriended various local animals (represented by puppets) including Oswald (or Ossie) the Rabbit, Dr. Fox, and Eager Beaver. Shaw voiced all the characters, but a staff of puppeteers animated them. Some of the puppeteers went on to greater fame, including Barry Levinson and Max Robinson.

After the initial success of the show on WTOP, The Washington Post replicated the concept at their Jacksonville, Florida affiliate, WJXT Channel 4. The Ranger Hal Show ran from 1958 through 1969, starring Henry Baran (the stage name of Henry Baranek, 1927–1979). Running in a similar timeslot, it was popular with adults as well as children, and maintained good viewing numbers for nearly its entire run.

When the original show ended in 1969, Hal Shaw was promoted to WTOP management. In 1977, he suffered from a brain aneurysm that left him permanently disabled. In 1985, the Forest Service made him an honorary ranger. He retired to his farm near Great Falls, Virginia, where he died from cancer in 1999.
