= Iger =

Iger is a surname. Notable people with the name include:

- Bob Iger (born 1951), American businessman, chairman and CEO of The Walt Disney Company
- Fred Iger (1924–2015), American comic book publisher
- Jerry Iger (1903–1990), American cartoonist

== See also ==
- Eisner & Iger, former comic book "packager"
- IGER, the Institute of Biological, Environmental and Rural Sciences
