= Casimiro Eiger =

Polish-Colombian art curator

Casimiro Eiger (born Kazimierz Mieczysław Eiger; 22 September 1909 – 15 March 1987), was a Polish immigrant activist, art critic, gallerist, and diplomatic representative of Poland in Colombia from 1946 to 1952.

== Biography ==
Kazimierz Mieczysław Eiger was born on 22 September 1909 into a wealthy Jewish industrialist family. His parents were Bolesław (1868–1923) and Diana Eiger (1868–1923), who was the daughter of industrialist Markus Silberstein. He had three siblings: his sister, Maria Eiger-Kamińska (1897–1983), was a Communist activist; his brother Stefan Napierski (1899–1940), a poet; and Zdzisław Eiger (died 1924).

He spent his youth in Lisowice, Zakopane (1921–1923), and Warsaw, where he studied at the Prince Józef Poniatowski High School No. 5 in Warsaw from 1926. He received a bachelor's degree in political and social sciences from the University of Geneva in 1931. From 1932 to 1936, he studied literature and art history at the University of Paris. He returned to Poland in 1938. Shortly before the outbreak of World War II, he left for Paris. From there, he travelled to Marseille, from where he sailed to South America through Morocco in 1941. However, the countries he arrived in refused to grant him asylum. Thanks to the efforts of diplomat Mieczysław Chałupczyński, Colombia issued him a visa.

In 1943, Eiger arrived in Bogotá. At his inspiration and with the help of Agence France-Presse correspondent Anna Kipper, the monthly Por Nuestra Libertad y la Vuestra ("For Our Freedom and Yours") was published there from 1943 to 1945. A collection of aid was organised for the Polish victims of the war and the Polish Armed Forces in the West. The Association of Poles in Colombia was established, linked to the Polish government-in-exile in London. Until 1945, he worked at the Polish embassy in Bogotá. After Chałupczyński's sudden death, Eiger served as the representative of the Polish government-in-exile from 1946 to 1952. He was also accredited to Ecuador. It was mainly an honorary role, due to Colombia's recognition of the Communist government in Warsaw.

He taught art history, the French language, French culture, and French literature at the Universidad Colegio Mayor de Cundinamarca from 1946 to 1959, and at the National University of Colombia from 1956 to 1964.

He was the founder and director of the first two profession art galleries in Bogotá: El Callejón and Arte Moderno, from 1961 to 1987. He was also a cofounder of the Bogotá Museum of Modern Art. During the 1950s, he was a respected art critic in Colombia and played a significant role in promoting local contemporary art. He was the producer of radio programmes about art for Radiodifusora Nacional de Colombia and HJCK. He was awarded the National Order of Merit for Art and Literature (Polish: Narodowym Orderem Zasług dla Sztuki i Literatury) on 12 March 1987.

He was a homosexual. As an adult, he identified as a Catholic. Other than French, he was fluent in Spanish, German, English, and to a lesser extent, Russian. He declared Polish nationality and citizenship until the end of his life. He was buried at the Central Cemetery in Bogotá.
