= Irena Tuwim =

Polish poet and translator

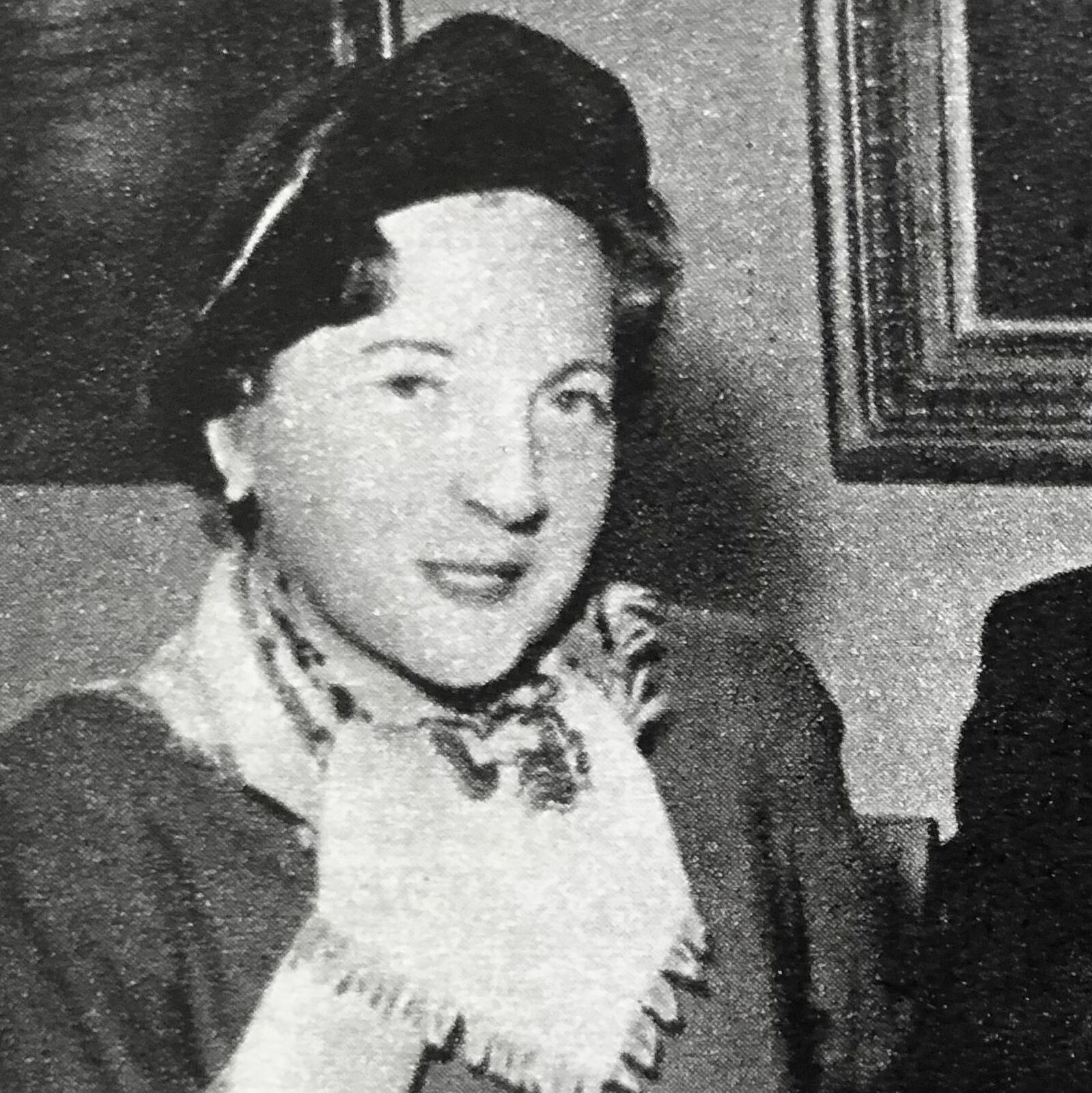
- Born: 22 August 1898 Łódź
- Died: 7 December 1987 (aged 89) Warsaw
- Language: Polish
- Notable works: translation of Winnie-the-Pooh, The House at Pooh Corner, Mary Poppins
- Spouse: Stefan Napierski (1922-1935); Julian Stawiński (1935-1973)

Irena Tuwim (1899–1987) was a Polish poet and translator. She translated Winnie-the-Pooh and The House at Pooh Corner to Polish.
