= Conrad Wilhelm Eger =

Norwegian businessman (1880–1966)

Conrad Wilhelm Eger, often referred to as C. W. Eger (12 December 1880 – 2 December 1966) was a Norwegian businessperson. An associate of Sam Eyde, Eger was the chief executive officer of Elkem from 1912 to 1950, and later played a role in building the Norwegian iron industry.

== Early life ==
He was born in Kristiania as a son of barrister Nicolai Andresen Eger (1849–1910) and his wife Marie Frimann Dietrichson (1853–1946). He was a brother of barrister Adolf Eger. In October 1911 he married Dikke Smith Housken (1890–1938), a daughter of dentist Ole Smith Housken.

== Business career ==
He took his examen artium in 1899 and engineer education in Dresden. After graduation in 1906 he became affiliated with industrialist Sam Eyde. From 1907 to 1908, Eger headed Eyde's engineer office in Kristiania. Between 1908 and 1910, he oversaw the construction of the power plant at Lienfoss in Telemark. In 1911 Eger took over as chief executive officer of the company Arendals Fossekompani. The next year, he became chief executive of Elektrokemisk, later renamed Elkem.

He had been a board member of Elektrokemisk since 1910. In 1912, he was also named as chair of the silicon carbide production company Arendal Smelteverk. He was also the chairman of the Norwegian Lawn Tennis Federation from 1913 to 1920. In 1924 he published the book Lawn-tennis; reissued in 1930 under the name Tennis.

== World War II ==
On 9 April 1940, Norway had been invaded by Germany as a part of World War II. The ruling cabinet Nygaardsvold and the Royal Family fled the capital Oslo, and Fascist politician Vidkun Quisling took advantage of the situation to perform a coup d'etat. However, this was highly unpopular among the Norwegian people, and the newly arrived German occupants did not support such a government either. The Supreme Court of Norway, with support from directors in business life and civil administration, was given the green light by German envoy Curt Bräuer to establish the so-called Administrative Council. On 3 May 1940, the Administrative Council established the Committee for Industry and Trade (Nemnda for industri og omsetning), to maintain industrial production in Norway throughout the hardships of the war. Conrad Wilhelm Eger had a central role in this committee, together with Carl Bøyesen, Einar Schjelderup, Elias Volan and chairman Einar Sunde. Eger was also a member of a committee that reviewed the potential for building more aluminium plants.

The German occupants eventually tightened their control over Norway, spearheaded by Reichskommissar Josef Terboven. The Administrative Council was abolished on 25 September 1940, and the Committee for Industry and Trade was abolished in February 1941. The Committee for Industry and Trade was scrutinized after the war, as a part of the legal purge in Norway after World War II.

In the autumn of 1941, Eger was behind a resistance to the German-friendly working committee in the Federation of Norwegian Industries. Together with Gunnar Schjelderup he created the industrial development group Studieselskapet for Norsk Industri. From 1944 it was coordinated with the industrial planning for the post-war age, conducted out of London and New York by Norwegian authorities-in-exile. Eger was also a central figure in Hjemmefrontens Ledelse. He had to flee to the neutral Sweden in 1944.

== Post-war ==
Eger was instrumental in the establishment of Norsk Jernverk in Mo i Rana in 1946, having been appointed as chairman of the national Ironworks Commission in August 1945 by the Gerhardsen's First Cabinet. He was chair of Elkem after stepping down as chief executive; from 1950 to 1959.

He chaired Forsikringsselskapet Norden from 1950 to 1955, and chaired the supervisory council of Christiania Bank og Kreditkasse from 1946 to 1953. He was also involved in academia, as a council member of NTNF and from 1951 as a fellow of the Norwegian Academy of Science and Letters. He was decorated as a Commander of the Order of St. Olav in 1954.
