= Ankerske Naturstein =

Stonemasonry company in Norway

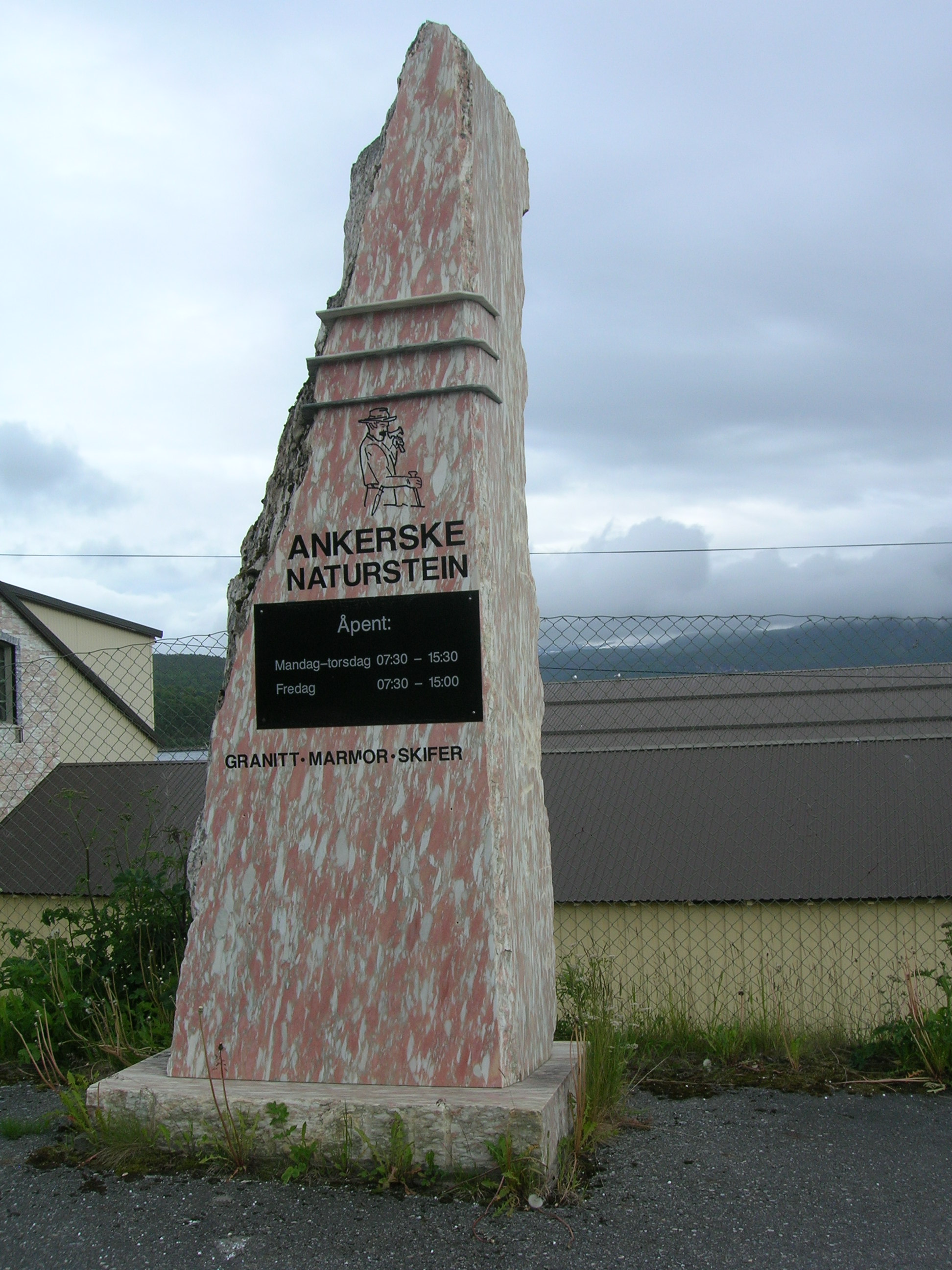

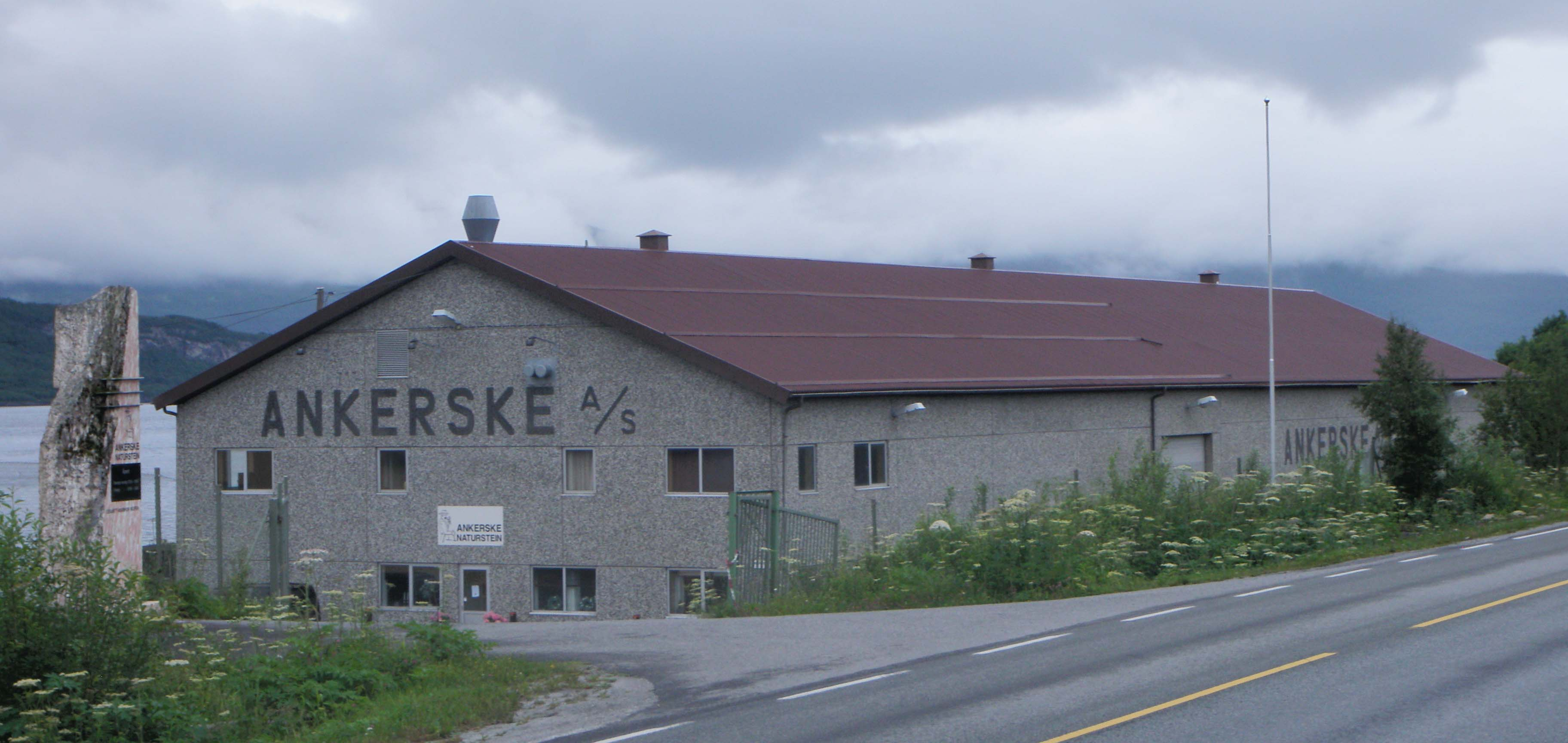
Ankerske Naturstein in Fauske

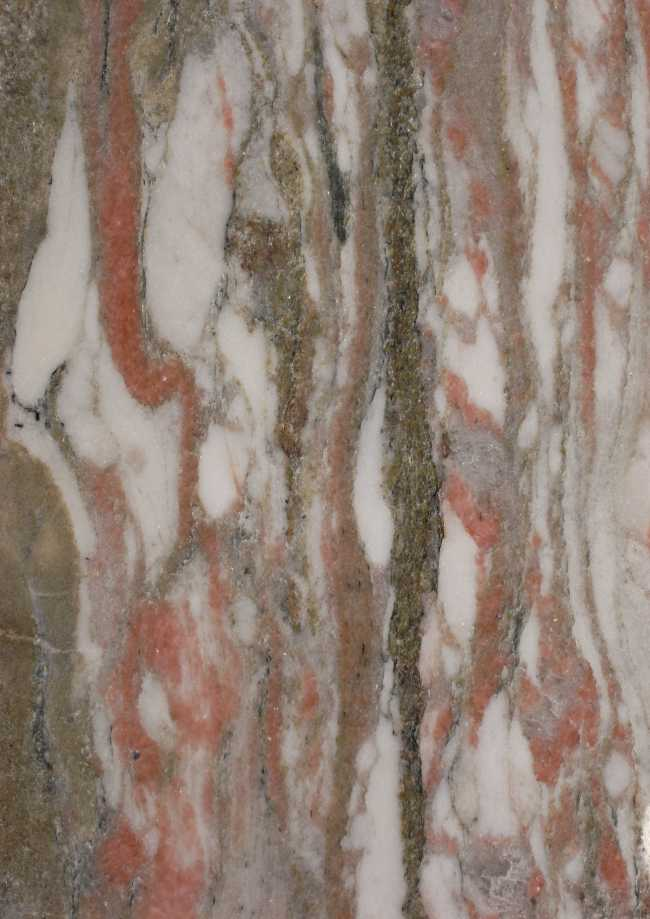
Marble Norwegian Rose or Furuli Rosé

Ankerske Naturstein is a stonemasonry company in Fauske, Norway. It was established as Den Ankerske Marmorforretning by Christian August Anker in 1885, when he established a marble refinery in Isebakke in Smaalenenes Amt. He bought a marble quarry in Fauske, and in 1910 the refinery was also moved there. It eventually expanded with several new quarries. Among others the company delivered marble to the United Nations Building.

The refinery in Fauske has been owned by the employees since 1999 under the name Ankerske Naturstein. The quarry was sold in 2000. The marble from the Furuli deposit was processed here.
