= Faith and Liberty Discovery Center =

Coordinates: 39.9508°N 75.1480°W

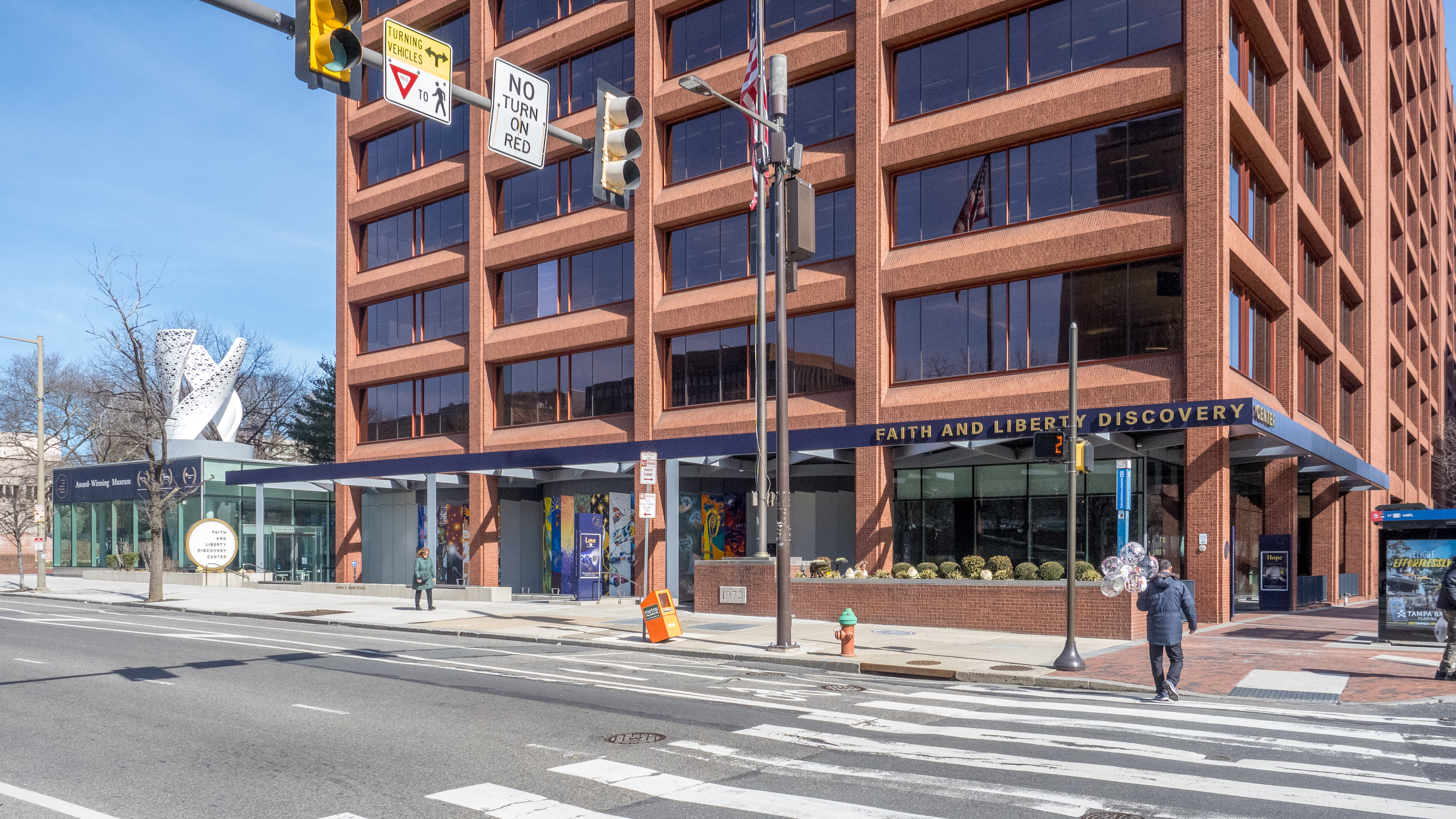
- Exterior of the Faith and Liberty Discovery Center, 2024
- Established: May 1, 2021
- Location: 101 N Independence Mall E Philadelphia, Pennsylvania, U.S.
- Type: History museum
- Website: www.faithandliberty.org

The Faith and Liberty Discovery Center (FLDC) was a museum on Philadelphia's Independence Mall.

The purpose of the museum, owned and operated by American Bible Society, was to explore the impact of Bible and religion on American society, particularly the impact during the Colonial American Period. The museum had galleries dedicated towards exploring faith, liberty, justice, hope, unity and love and how those topics impacted American cultural and political history.

Opened in July 2021, the museum closed in March 2024.

== Background ==
The 40,000 square feet (3,700 m^{2}), $60 million project was designed by Local Projects, the firm that designed the National September 11 Memorial & Museum. Local Projects created technology for all visitors, including a lamp, that helps tailor their experiences.

== History ==
The center opened in May 2021 and focused on the impact of the Bible on the men and women who built United States, from the Founders, through abolitionists and suffragists, celebrating the civil rights activists, and continuing to the present day.

In 2021, Local Projects and the FLDC were named for exhibition design of the year in the Dezeen Awards 2021 public vote. Architectural design was led by the Philadelphia principals of JacobsWyper Architects' SaylorGregg Studio.

In March 2024, the American Bible Society announced it would be closing the center and The Faith and Liberty Discovery Center closed on Thursday, March 28, 2024.

== See also ==
- American Bible Society
