= Romney Presbyterian Church =

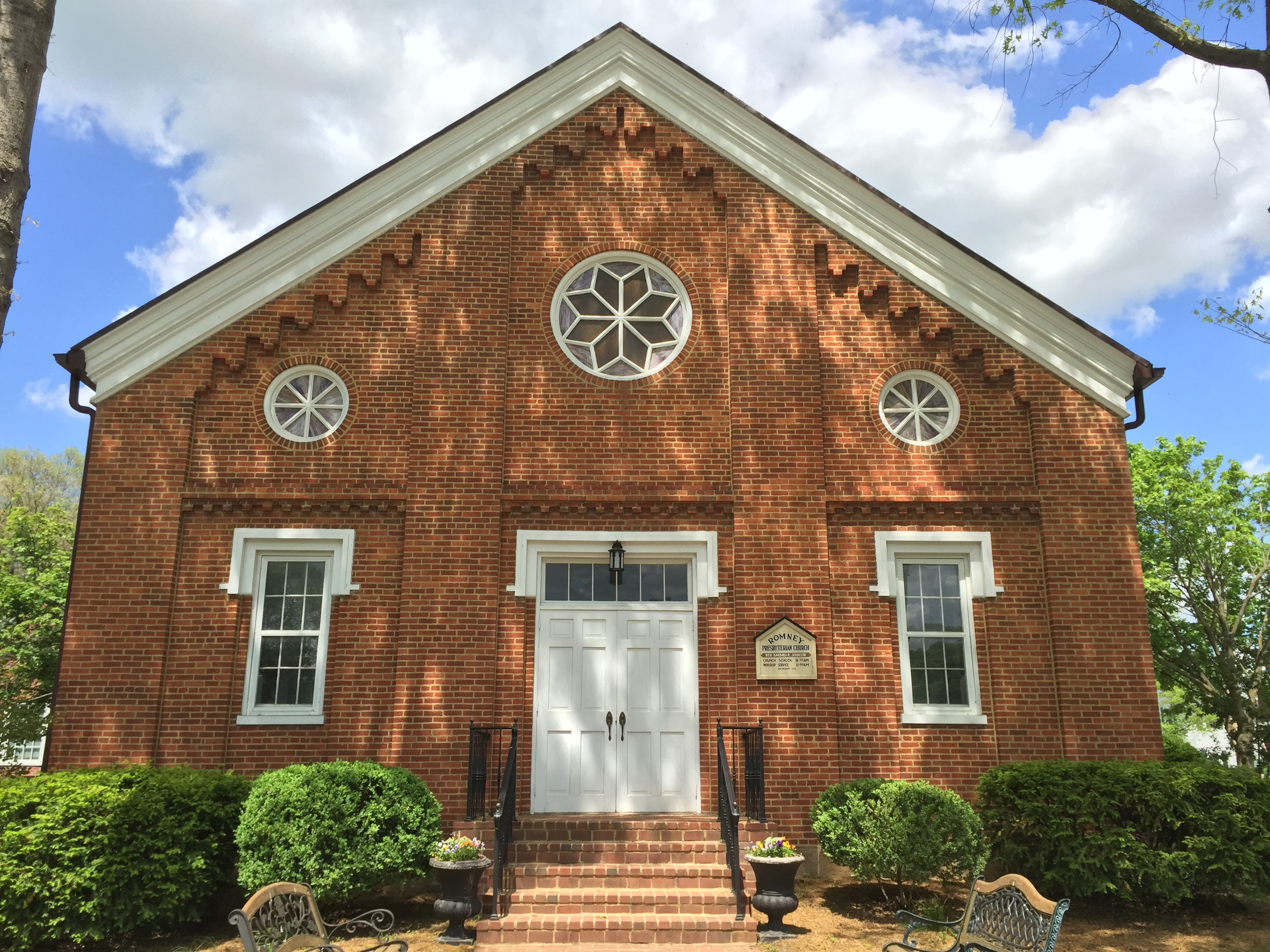
- Southern elevation facing Rosemary Lane

- Romney Presbyterian Church Romney Presbyterian Church (Eastern Panhandle of West Virginia) Romney Presbyterian Church (West Virginia) Romney Presbyterian Church (the United States)
- 39.343637°N 78.757196°W
- Location: 100 West Rosemary Lane; Romney, West Virginia
- Country: United States
- Denomination: Presbyterian Church (USA)
- Previous denomination: Presbyterian Church in the United States
- Website: www.romneypresbyterianchurch.org

History
- Founded: 1860

Romney Presbyterian Church is a historic Presbyterian church in Romney, West Virginia.

== Location ==
The church is located at 100 West Rosemary Lane in Romney, West Virginia.

== History ==
The church building was erected in 1860.

During the American Civil War of 1861–1865, it was used both as a stable and a hospital for the Confederate States Army.
