= Wirgman Building =

Commercial, residential building in Romney, US

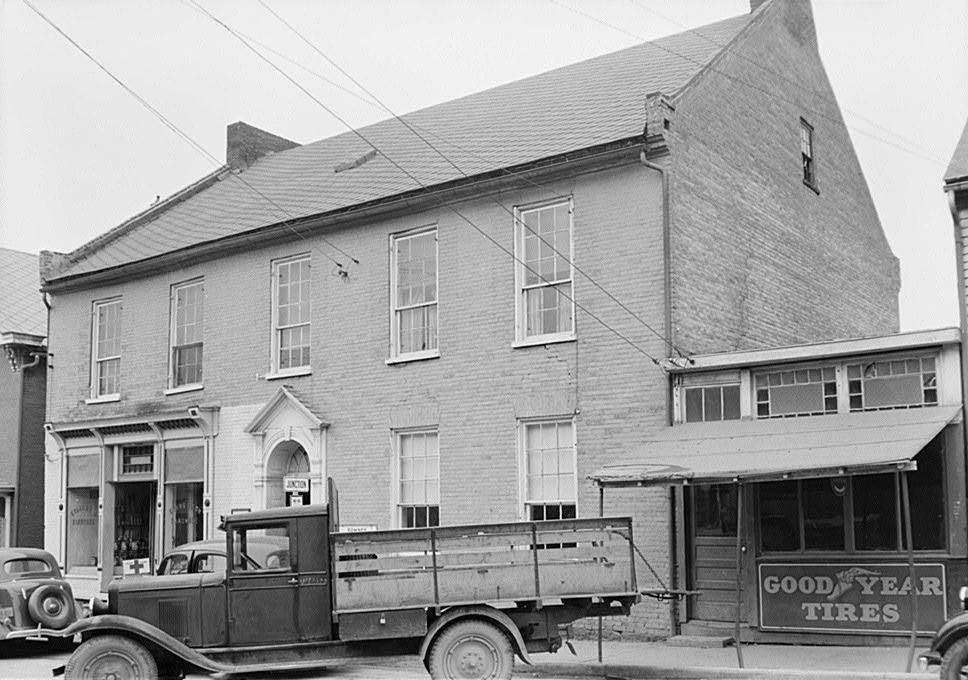
- Historic American Buildings Survey photograph of the Wirgman Building in 1937.

- Location within Romney, West Virginia Location within Eastern Panhandle of West Virginia Location within West Virginia Location within the United States
- Alternative names: Old Wirgman Building; Bank of the Valley of Virginia Building; Valley Bank Building; Bank of Romney Building; First National Bank of Romney Building

General information
- Type: Commercial and residential
- Architectural style: Federal
- Location: East Main Street, Romney, West Virginia, United States
- Coordinates: 39.341874°N 78.755719°W
- Current tenants: Former tenants: Bank of the Valley of Virginia; Hampshire Review; Bank of Romney; First National Bank of Romney; Peaford Company furniture store
- Completed: circa 1825
- Destroyed: 1964
- Demolished: 1965
- Client: William Vance (c. 1825)
- Owner: Mrs. W. F. Wirgman (1937)

The Wirgman Building was an early 19th-century Federal-style commercial and residential building located on East Main Street (U.S. Route 50) in Romney, West Virginia. It was completed around 1825 to serve as the Romney branch office of the Bank of the Valley of Virginia, and served as a location for every subsequent bank established in Romney, including the Bank of Romney and the First National Bank of Romney. During the American Civil War, the building was used as a military prison. For a time, its second floor housed the offices and printing plant of the Hampshire Review newspaper, and by 1947 its ground floor housed office and mercantile space, and the second floor was divided into apartments.

In 1964 the Wirgman Building sustained damage in a fire; it was demolished the following year to make way for the new Bank of Romney headquarters building, which opened in 1966. Prior to its demolition, in 1937, the Wirgman Building was photographed and documented by the National Park Service's Historic American Buildings Survey.

== History ==
=== Background ===
In 1790, the trustees of the Town of Romney commissioned John Mitchel to draft a cadastral survey map of Romney. Prior to this survey, Thomas Fairfax, 6th Lord Fairfax of Cameron had commissioned a similar cadastral survey of the town sometime before its incorporation on December 23, 1762. On June 30, 1790, Mitchel submitted to the trustees a "Plan of the Town of Romney" that divided the town into 100 land lots of equal size, with four lots adjacent to the courthouse comprising the "publick" square. The Wirgman Building was later built upon the "publick" land lot numbered "Lot 76". Romney's first cemetery was present on the lot when it was a part of the courthouse square. The cemetery's interments were located on the actual site and to the rear of the future Wirgman Building.

=== Bank of the Valley of Virginia ===
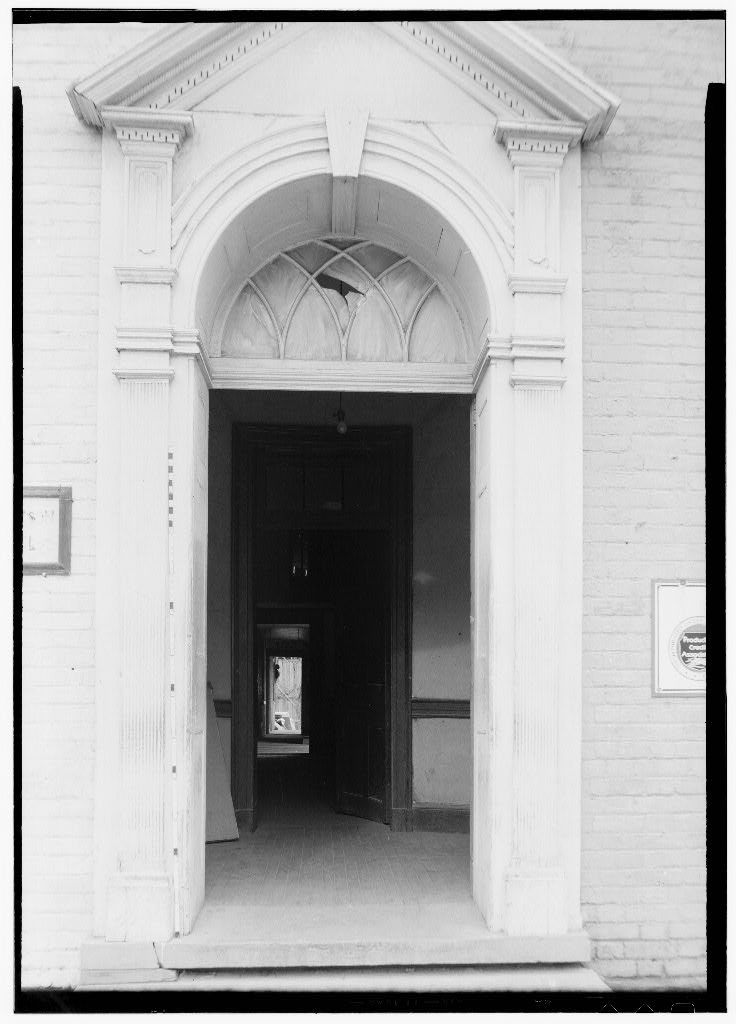
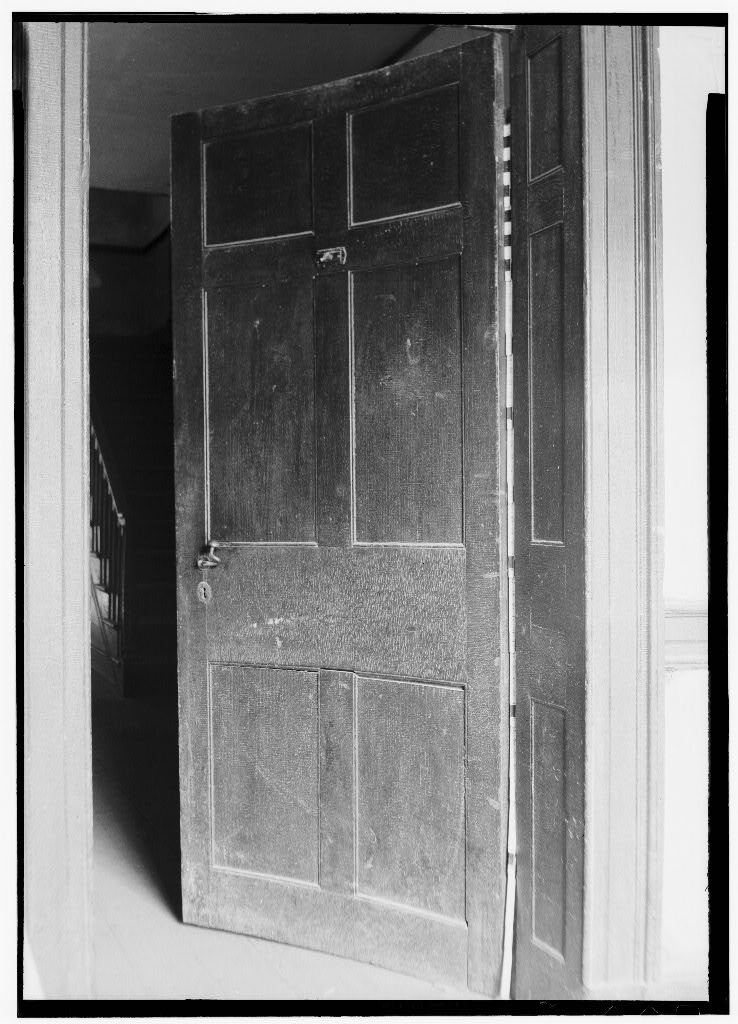
Historic American Buildings Survey (HABS) photographs from 1937 of the Wirgman Building's main entryway (pictured left) and the rounded interior doorway between the building's entrance and stair halls (pictured right).

The Wirgman Building was erected around 1825 by William Vance to house the office of the newly established Romney branch of the Bank of the Valley of Virginia, which was headquartered in Winchester, Virginia. In an act of the Virginia General Assembly on February 5, 1817, the Bank of the Valley of Virginia was authorized to open branches in Berkeley, Hampshire, Hardy, and Jefferson counties if citizens in each of these areas could raise $100,000 in stock to establish a branch. This provision was met when the necessary stock was raised, and the Bank of the Valley of Virginia branch in Romney was opened around 1825 in the Wirgman Building. In 1845, historian Henry Howe traveled through Romney and described the town as "one of considerable business, and has a branch of the Bank of the Valley, several stores, and about 350 inhabitants". The bank branch continued to operate from the Wirgman Building until the Bank of the Valley of Virginia in Winchester suspended its operations and those of its branches following the outbreak of the American Civil War in 1861.

=== American Civil War ===
During the American Civil War, the Wirgman Building was frequently used as a military prison by both Confederate States Army and Union Army forces during their occupations of Romney. In early 1862, Lieutenant John Blue, a spy for the command of Stonewall Jackson, was captured by Union Army soldiers while he was conducting a reconnaissance mission to determine the size and strength of the Union Army forces occupying Romney. Pending his transfer to a military prison in Wheeling where he was to be tried as a suspected spy, Blue was imprisoned in a room on the second floor of the Wirgman Building. During the early morning of April 20—Easter Day—Blue disabled the only guard on duty, disguised himself in a Union Army coat and headgear and barricaded the remainder of the prison garrison within the building. Blue, unnoticed by the occupying Union Army forces, walked to the periphery of Romney town and reached safety.

=== Hampshire Review ===
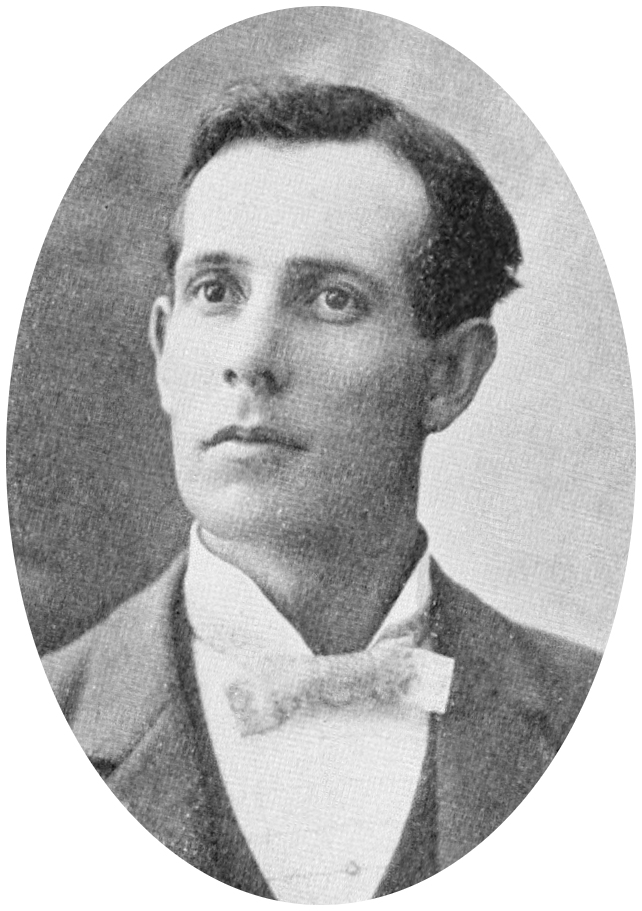
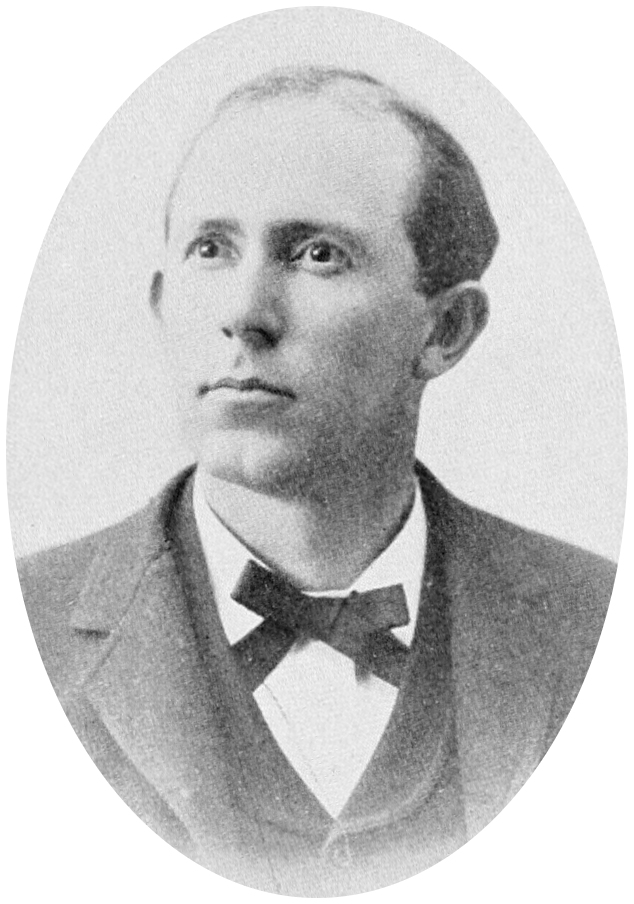
John J. Cornwell (pictured left) and his brother William B. Cornwell (pictured right) purchased the Hampshire Review in 1890, and operated the newspaper from the second floor of the Wirgman Building until 1895.

The Hampshire Review newspaper occupied the building's second floor with its offices and printing plant from 1884 to 1895. In 1890 John J. Cornwell—who later became West Virginia's governor—and his brother William B. Cornwell purchased the newspaper, which continued to operate from the second floor of the Wirgman Building until 1895, when the brothers relocated the office and printing plant to the first floor of their new brick building on West Main Street. During its occupation of the Wirgman Building, the Hampshire Review was printed with a hand-operated Benjamin Franklin printing press.

=== Bank of Romney ===
Banking operations in Hampshire County ceased throughout the American Civil War; a new banking institution was not established in Romney until 1888. By September of that year, a coordinated effort by Romney's leading citizens amassed subscriptions for the entirety of the initial offering of 300 shares of stock for the establishment of the Bank of Romney. The shareholders of the Bank of Romney petitioned the Secretary of State of West Virginia for a charter with capital stock totaling $30,000.

Following the state's approval of its charter, the Bank of Romney commenced its operations in the Wirgman Building on December 20, 1888. The bank occupied two rented rooms on the building's first floor, which it shared with a pharmacy. The Bank of Romney initially used a safe as its bank vault, and security for the bank was provided by a nightwatchman who slept in one of the bank's two rooms. The Wirgman Building's security was further enhanced with the installation of wire mesh glass and bars in the windows. During the bank's occupation at the Wirgman Building, Henry Bell Gilkeson served as the bank's president. The Bank of Romney began to outgrow its first floor space almost immediately after its incorporation, and in 1906 it moved across East Main Street to a new bank building.

=== First National Bank of Romney ===
The Wirgman Building again housed a banking institution four years later when the First National Bank of Romney opened on June 11, 1910, in the first floor office space previously occupied by the Bank of Romney. The First National Bank of Romney vacated the Wirgman Building in 1911, when it moved to its new, three-story building known as the National Building at the corner of West Main and South High Streets directly across from Literary Hall. At various times from its construction around 1825 until 1911, the Wirgman Building served as the location for every bank established in Romney since the Bank of the Valley of Virginia.

=== Later years ===
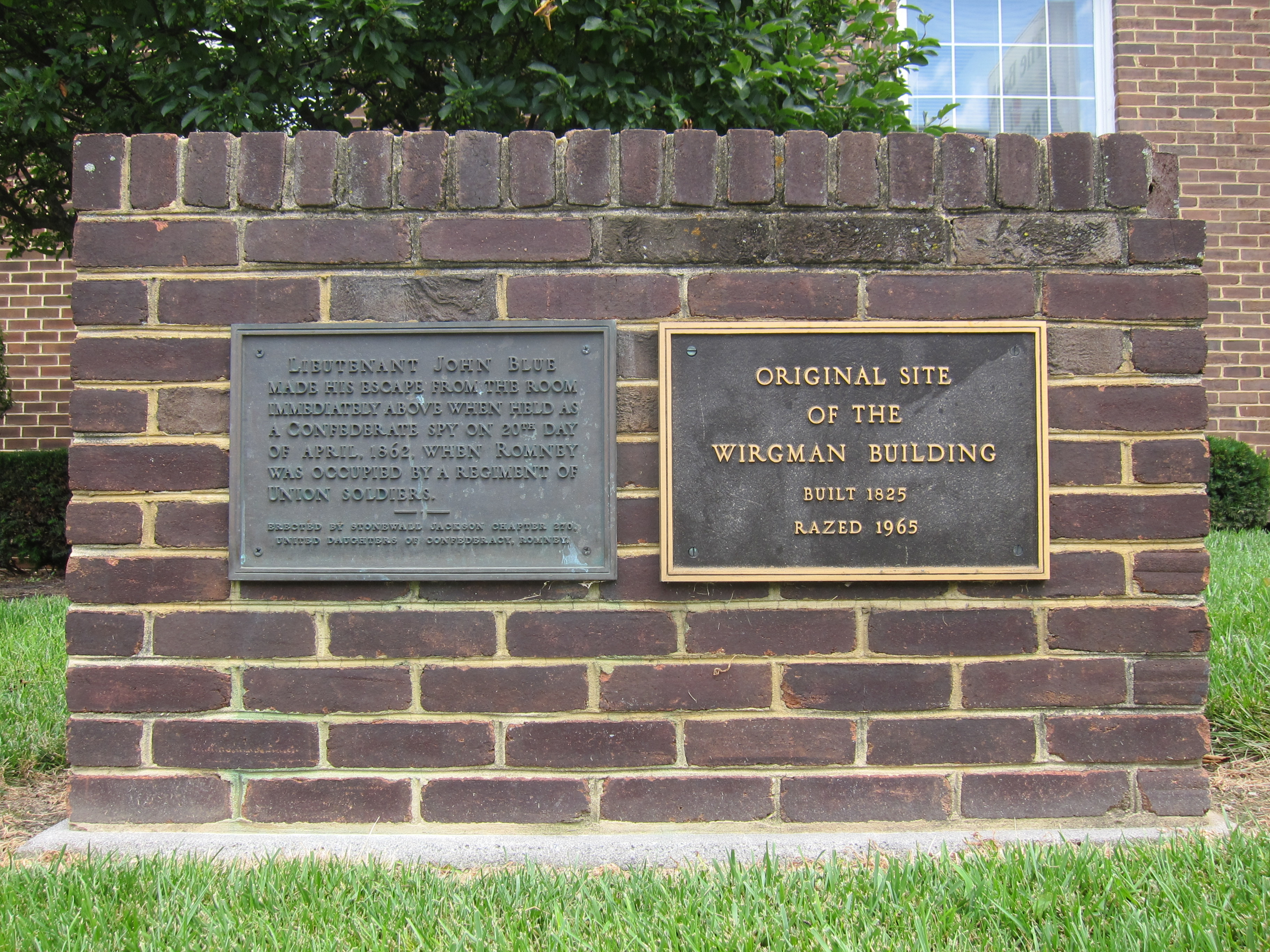
Two historical markers in front of the Bank of Romney memorialize the Wirgman Building: the first marker (pictured left) was erected by the United Daughters of the Confederacy to commemorate Lieutenant John Blue's escape from the building during the American Civil War, and the second marker (pictured right) reads "Original Site of the Wirgman Building. Built 1825. Razed 1965."

In its final years, the Wirgman Building housed office and mercantile spaces on its first floor, and its second floor was divided into apartments. In 1937, the National Park Service Historic American Buildings Survey (HABS) photographed and documented the architectural details of the building. At the time of its documentation by HABS, the building was owned by Mrs. W. F. Wirgman, whose family's surname likely gave the structure its local toponym. HABS referred to the Wirgman Building as the "Valley Bank Building" in its supplemental documentation, which was completed by Archie A. Biggs. In September 1937, the West Virginia State Road Commission released a state road map highlighting the history of the Potomac Highlands through photographs; the map included a feature on the Wirgman Building and Lieutenant John Blue's escape during its use as a military prison during the American Civil War.

By 1954, the Wirgman Building housed an electrical shop and two residential units. Throughout the 1950s, the Romney community used the building for multiple purposes. The Romney Fire Department used the building to host its annual Easter flower sale in March 1956, and in December 1956, the Hampshire County Democratic Committee was permitted to erect a sign on the building. In 1962, the Wirgman Building was one of the Romney landmarks recognized during the city's observance of its bicentennial.

==== Fire and demolition ====
On February 15, 1964, the Wirgman Building sustained significant damage from a fire. At the time of the fire, the first floor of the building housed the Peaford Company furniture store. Mrs. John Williams, operator of the nearby New Century Hotel, was the first person to observe the fire; she raised the alarm around 6:25 a.m. The Romney Fire Department responded and fought the blaze for over eight hours, with the assistance of fire companies from Augusta, Slanesville, and Fort Ashby. When firefighters left the scene around 3:30 p.m., only the brick walls of the building remained standing. Firefighters approximated that 60,000 U.S. gallons (230,000 L) of water had been used to fight the fire. Though assessed to have been extinguished, the fire re-established the following day.

According to Romney Fire Department Chief Eugene Dorsey, the Wirgman Building was uninsured and its damage was estimated at $5,000. Dorsey estimated damages to the partially-insured Peaford Company furniture store at $6,000.

Following the fire, the Bank of Romney purchased the Wirgman Building and demolished it, along with the neighboring historic Brady House, in 1965 to make way for the bank's new headquarters building. Having outgrown its 1906 building, the Bank of Romney returned across East Main Street to the site of the Wirgman Building following completion of its new, larger headquarters facility in 1966.

== Architecture ==
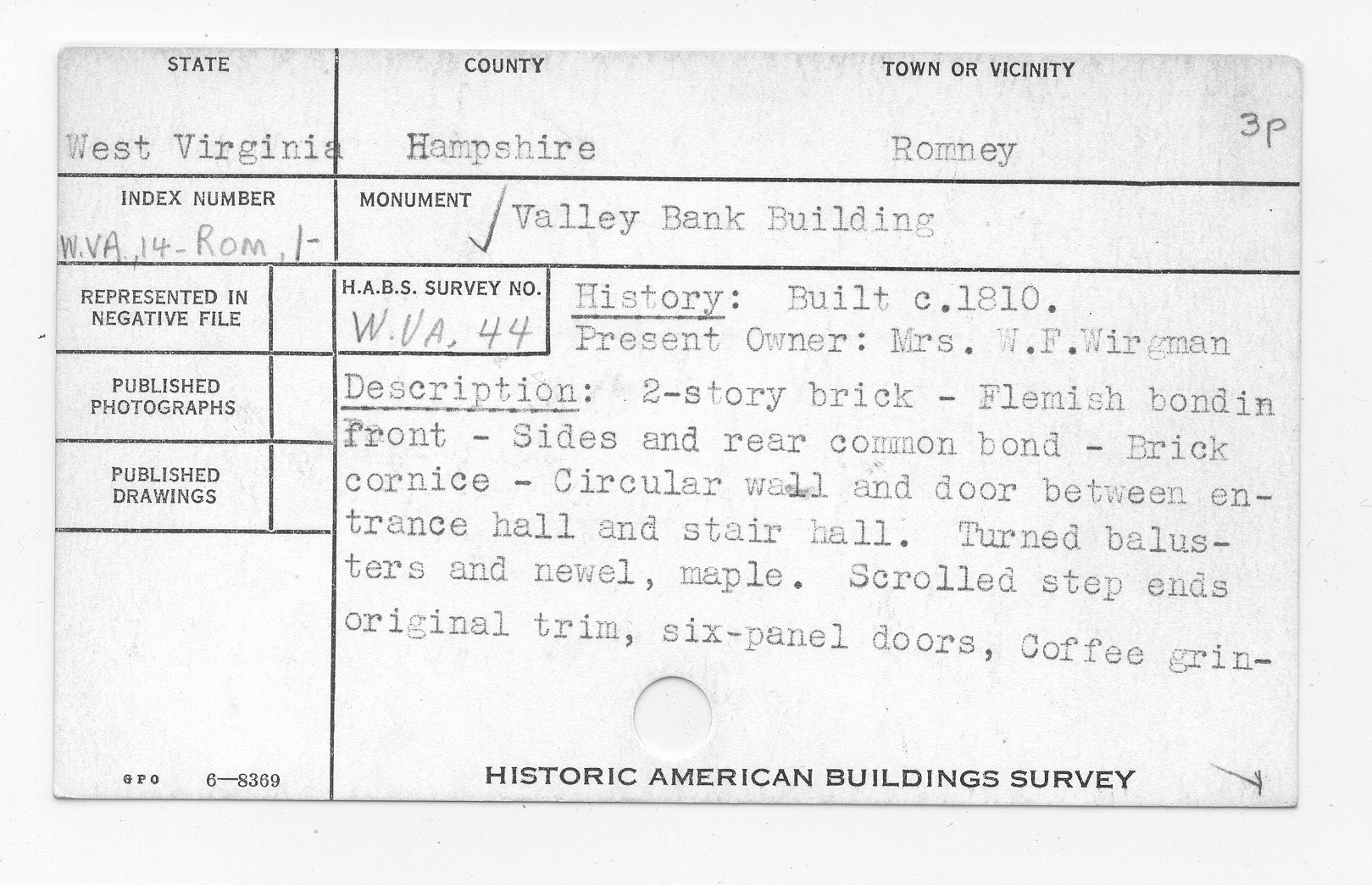
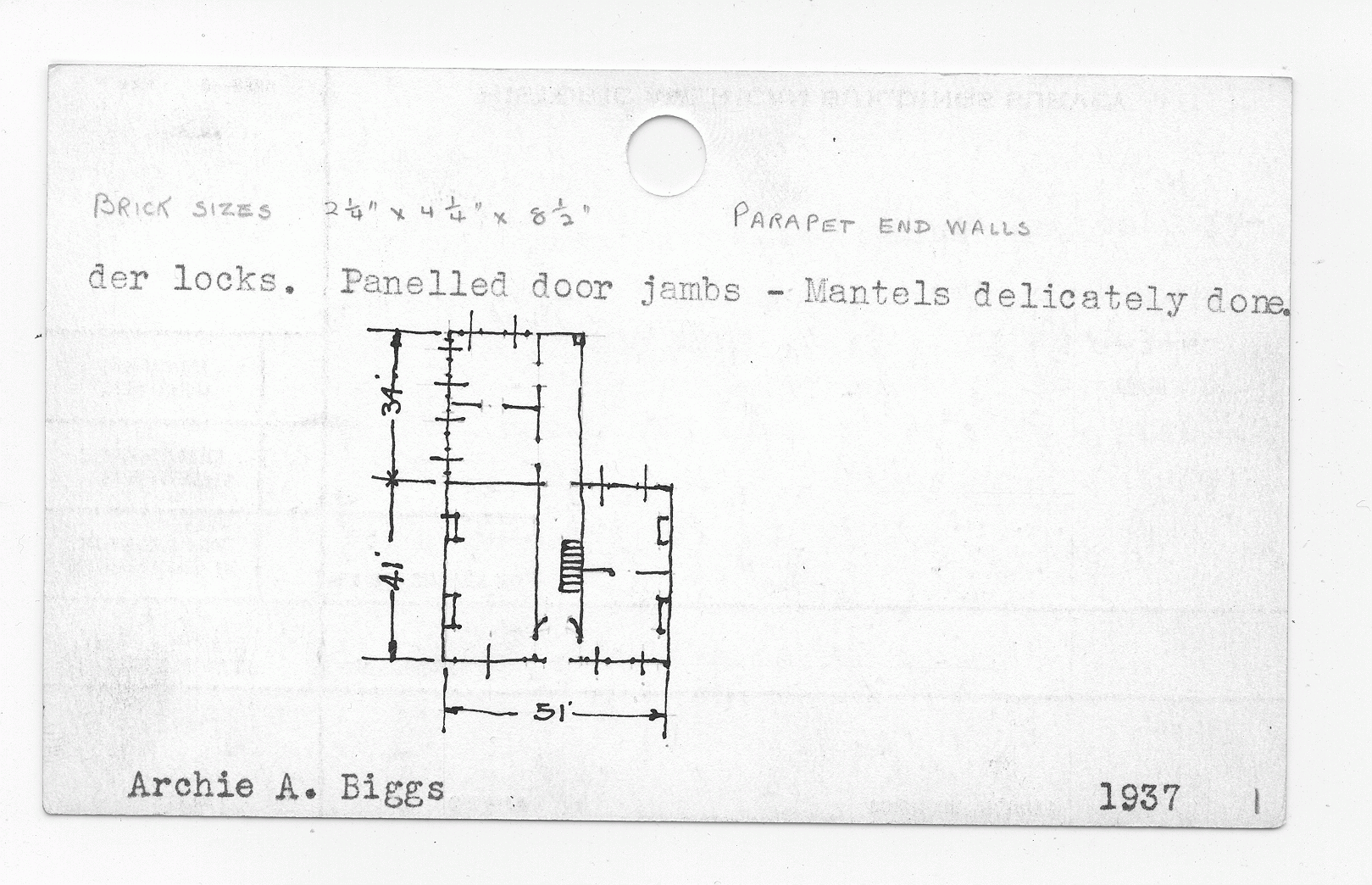
Historic American Buildings Survey supplementary documentation illustrating the architectural layout and details of the Wirgman Building, completed by Archie A. Biggs in 1937.

Existing information on the architectural details of the Wirgman Building are known through the HABS supplementary documentation written by Archie A. Biggs in 1937, and a Cumberland Evening Times article in 1954. The Cumberland Evening Times averred that the building had not undergone major structural changes since the American Civil War.

=== Exterior ===
The Wirgman Building was exemplary of the Federal style of architecture. It was a thick-walled edifice rising two stories and constructed of brick. The building's brickwork was built in the Flemish bond style on the building's façade and in the American bond style on the building's sides and rear face. The building's façade along East Main Street measured 51 feet (16 m), and its sides measured 41 feet (12 m), with a rear extension measuring 34 feet (10 m). The building featured a brick cornice along its roofline and parapet end walls on its sides. According to HABS documentation, the building's bricks measured 2 ¼ x 4 ¼ x 8 ½ in size.

=== Interior ===
A circular wall with a six-panel wooden door rounded to mimic the wall's curvature was located between the entrance hall and the stair hall of the Wirgman Building. The stairway's balustrade in the stair hall featured turned baluster shafts and a newel post crafted from maple. The stairs themselves featured scrolled step ends. The building's interior doors were six-panel wooden doors with paneled door jambs. Instead of turning door knobs, these wooden doors were equipped with "iron lever-like" devices that unlatched the doors when pushed down. HABS supplementary documentation described "coffee grinder"-style locks. Its doorways were reported to have maintained their original decorative molding trim, and the fireplace mantelpieces as being "delicately done". The Wirgman Building also featured old wooden floors, which the Cumberland Evening Times said emitted "aged groans" when walked upon.

== Legacy ==
In his Buildings of West Virginia (2004), architectural historian S. Allen Chambers wrote that of the "most significant early buildings" demolished in Romney, the Wirgman Building is one of the town's "major losses". Prior to its destruction, a 1954 article in the Cumberland Evening Times characterized the building as an "aged monument to the Civil War and horse and buggy days, as motorized traffic on U.S. 50 whizzes by its door". In 1982, the Cumberland Evening Times listed the Wirgman Building among a list of Romney's significant demolished landmarks, along with the original Romney First Baptist Church, the Brady House, the New Century Hotel, and the original Romney Christian Church.

Two commemorative plaques in front of the Bank of Romney are the only reminders of the Wirgman Building at its original site. A plaque erected by the Stonewall Jackson Chapter of the United Daughters of the Confederacy to commemorate the escape of Lieutenant John Blue from the Wirgman Building during its use as a Union Army military prison was originally affixed to the building's street façade. The other plaque says: "Original Site of the Wirgman Building. Built 1825. Razed 1965."

== Bibliography ==
- Blue, John (1994). Daniel P. Oates (ed.). Hanging Rock Rebel: Lt. John Blue's War in West Virginia and the Shenandoah Valley. Shippensburg, Pennsylvania: Burd Street Press. ISBN 978-0-942597-62-2. OCLC 29254746.
- Brannon, Selden W., ed. (1976). Historic Hampshire: A Symposium of Hampshire County and Its People, Past and Present. Parsons, West Virginia: McClain Printing Company. ISBN 978-0-87012-236-1. OCLC 3121468.
- Chambers, S. Allen (2004). Buildings of West Virginia. Oxford, New York City: Oxford University Press. ISBN 978-0-19-516548-7. OCLC 53315276.
- Federal Writers' Project (1937). Historic Romney 1762–1937. Romney, West Virginia: Federal Writers' Project, The Town Council of Romney, West Virginia. OCLC 2006735.
- Federal Writers' Project; West Virginia State Board of Education; Federal Works Agency; Work Projects Administration (1941). West Virginia: A Guide to the Mountain State. New York City: Federal Writers' Project, The Conservation Commission of West Virginia, Oxford University Press. ISBN 9781603540476. OCLC 289199. Archived from the original on October 11, 2013 – via Google Books.
- Hampshire County Extension Homemakers (1991). Hampshire County, West Virginia: A Pictorial History. Marceline, Missouri: Hampshire County Extension Homemakers, Walsworth Publishing Company. ISBN 978-1-60354-047-6. OCLC 51940415.
- Maxwell, Hu; Swisher, Howard Llewellyn (1897). History of Hampshire County, West Virginia From Its Earliest Settlement to the Present. Morgantown, West Virginia: A. Brown Boughner, Printer. OCLC 680931891. OL 23304577M.
- Munske, Roberta R.; Kerns, Wilmer L., eds. (2004). Hampshire County, West Virginia, 1754–2004. Romney, West Virginia: The Hampshire County 250th Anniversary Committee. ISBN 978-0-9715738-2-6. OCLC 55983178.
