= Marshall S. Cornwell =

American writer and newspaper publisher

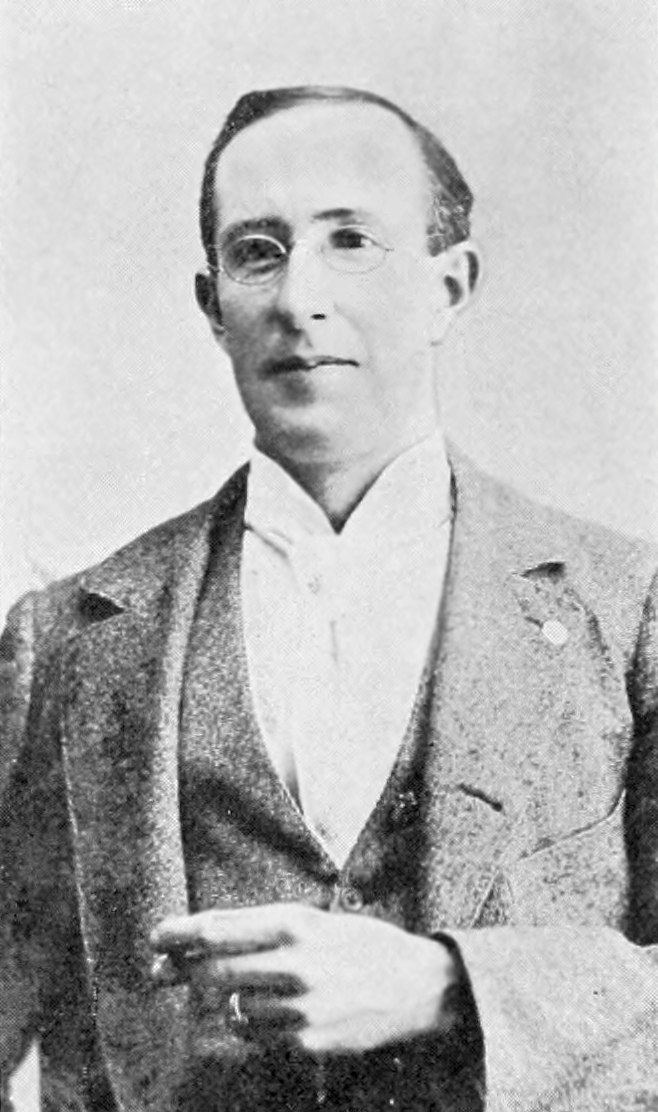
- Born: Marshall Silas Cornwell; October 18, 1871 near Springfield, West Virginia, US
- Died: May 26, 1898 (aged 26); Romney, West Virginia, US
- Resting place: Indian Mound Cemetery, Romney, West Virginia
- Occupations: newspaper publisher; newspaper editor; journalist; assistant clerk, West Virginia House of Delegates; writer; poet; Secretary, West Virginia Schools for the Deaf and Blind Board of Regents
- Works: Wheat and Chaff (1899)
- Political party: Republican
- Parent(s): Jacob H. Cornwell (father); Mary Eleanor Taylor Cornwell (mother)
- Relatives: William B. Cornwell (brother); John J. Cornwell (brother); Edna Brady Cornwell (sister-in-law); Stephen Ailes (great-nephew)

Marshall Silas Cornwell (October 18, 1871 – May 26, 1898) was a 19th-century American newspaper publisher and editor, writer and poet in the U.S. state of West Virginia. Cornwell was a younger brother of railroad and timber executive William B. Cornwell (1864–1926) and West Virginia Governor John Jacob Cornwell (1867–1953).

He was born on his family's farm on South Branch Mountain near Springfield, West Virginia in 1871 and received his education at home and in nearby rural schools. He left his family's farm and became editor and publisher of the South Branch Gazette newspaper in Petersburg, West Virginia in 1893. The newspaper prospered under his leadership and his editorials received the attention of United States Senator Stephen Benton Elkins. He was briefly the editor of The Mountain Breeze newspaper in Petersburg in 1894. At the invitation of Elkins, Cornwell began operating The Inter-Mountain newspaper in Elkins, West Virginia that same year, and its circulation increased under his leadership. During his tenure there, Cornwell served as an assistant clerk of the West Virginia House of Delegates under Chief Clerk William M. O. Dawson, who later served as Governor of West Virginia. In 1896 Cornwell represented Randolph County as a delegate to the West Virginia Republican Party 2nd Congressional District convention.

Cornwell's health declined in 1896, possibly due to tuberculosis, and he subsequently resigned as the editor of The Inter-Mountain to concentrate on improving his health. During the winter of 1896–97, Cornwell traveled to the eastern shore of Florida and wrote poetry. He returned to Hampshire County in 1897, where he was appointed secretary of the West Virginia Schools for the Deaf and Blind Board of Regents. He also wrote a column in his brothers' Hampshire Review newspaper entitled "Wheat and Chaff." Cornwell traveled to the Rio Grande in southwest Texas throughout the winter of 1897–98 to improve his health in the warmer climate. He continued writing short essays about his travels and the places he encountered. Cornwell returned to his home in Romney in 1898 where he died from tuberculosis at age 26. Following his death, his brothers William and John Jacob published a collection of his poetry in 1899 in a volume entitled Wheat and Chaff. After this, newspapers across the United States, including the St. Louis Globe-Democrat, The Baltimore Sun, The Morning Post in Raleigh and The Railroad Trainman republished his poem "Success".

== Early life and education ==
Marshall Silas Cornwell was born on his family's farm on South Branch Mountain (also known as "Jersey Mountain") near Springfield, 12 miles (19 km) from Romney, in Hampshire County, West Virginia on October 18, 1871. He was the third-eldest son and child of Jacob H. Cornwell and his wife Mary Eleanor Taylor Cornwell. Cornwell's older brothers were railroad and timber executive William B. Cornwell (1864–1926) and John Jacob Cornwell (1867–1953), who served as the 15th Governor of West Virginia (1917–21).

Cornwell grew to adulthood on his family's farm and although he did not have access to a liberal education, he received his education at home and in rural schools. As an autodidact in various subjects, he was well-read, exhibited an "insatiable thirst for knowledge" and possessed a remarkable memory.

== Career as newspaper editor and publisher ==
In 1890 Cornwell's elder brothers William and John Jacob Cornwell purchased The Review newspaper in Romney. Later that year, the Cornwell brothers purchased The Review's rival newspaper in Romney, the South Branch Intelligencer. Following this acquisition, the Cornwell brothers added Hampshire to the newspaper's name and included and the South Branch Intelligencer in smaller print within the masthead underneath The Hampshire Review. His brothers' newspaper work may have inspired Cornwell's interest in becoming a newspaper editor and publisher.

In 1893 Cornwell left his family's farm and became the editor and publisher of the South Branch Gazette newspaper in Petersburg in Grant County, West Virginia. When he became managing editor of the South Branch Gazette, The Clarksburg Telegram praised Cornwell "as one of the rising young men of the Little Mountain State." The Gazette became a profitable newspaper under his leadership and its success, and his well-written editorials, received the attention of United States Senator Stephen Benton Elkins. In 1894, Cornwell became the editor of The Mountain Breeze newspaper in Petersburg.

Elkins invited Cornwell to take charge of The Inter-Mountain newspaper in Elkins in Randolph County. Cornwell accepted the position from Elkins in 1894 and made a success of the paper just as he had done with the Gazette in Petersburg. The circulation of The Inter-Mountain increased under his leadership. The Clarksburg Telegram again remarked upon Cornwell's abilities as a newspaper editor in June 1895, stating that The Inter-Mountain was "destined to play a prominent part in the journalism of this State if it continues long under the management of that energetic and wide awake young West Virginian, M. S. Cornwell." In July 1895, Cornwell and Tygart's Valley News editor Z. F. Collett jointly published an eight-page, eight-columned illustrated paper celebrating the notable businesspersons and industries of Elkins and other towns along the West Virginia Central Railroad. This special edition paper earned praise from the Cumberland Evening Times newspaper in nearby Cumberland, Maryland. Cornwell specially wrote and recited his poem "The Blue and the Gray" at a joint celebration of Washington's Birthday by a Grand Army of the Republic post and a United Confederate Veterans camp in Elkins.

In addition to his newspaper work, Cornwell also became active in the West Virginia Republican Party. In 1895, he served as an assistant clerk of the West Virginia House of Delegates under Chief Clerk William M. O. Dawson during a session of the West Virginia Legislature. Dawson later served as the 12th Governor of West Virginia (1905–09). On June 23, 1896, Cornwell represented Randolph County as a delegate to the West Virginia Republican Party 2nd Congressional District convention in Morgantown.

== Writing and poetry career ==
Cornwell's health began to fail, possibly as a result of tuberculosis, and he resigned from his position as editor of The Inter-Mountain in 1896. Throughout his career as a newspaper editor, Cornwell wrote poetry in his spare time and had some of it published. J. Slidell Brown, president of the West Virginia Editorial Association, asked Cornwell compose a special poem to commemorate the association's annual meeting in Elkins in 1896. He wrote an ode to editors entitled "The Editor-Man"; however he had grown too ill to attend the conference and Brown read the poem in his absence. "The Editor Man" was later published in the Buffalo Evening News in August 1897.

Cornwell traveled to the eastern coast of Florida in search of a cure for his worsening illness in late 1896. In Florida he studied the "character of the country and people" and continued to write poetry. He returned to Hampshire County, West Virginia in early 1897 and initiated a correspondence with American writer and poet James Whitcomb Riley. In a letter dated March 12, 1897, from Indianapolis, Riley commended Cornwell on a collection of his poems with special attention given to his poem "Success". Of "Success" Riley wrote "your gift seems genuine and far above that indicated in verse, meeting general approval." "Success" had previously earned Cornwell a first place, cash prize in a poetry competition sponsored by West Virginia University's Athenaeum newspaper, which featured his poem in their paper.

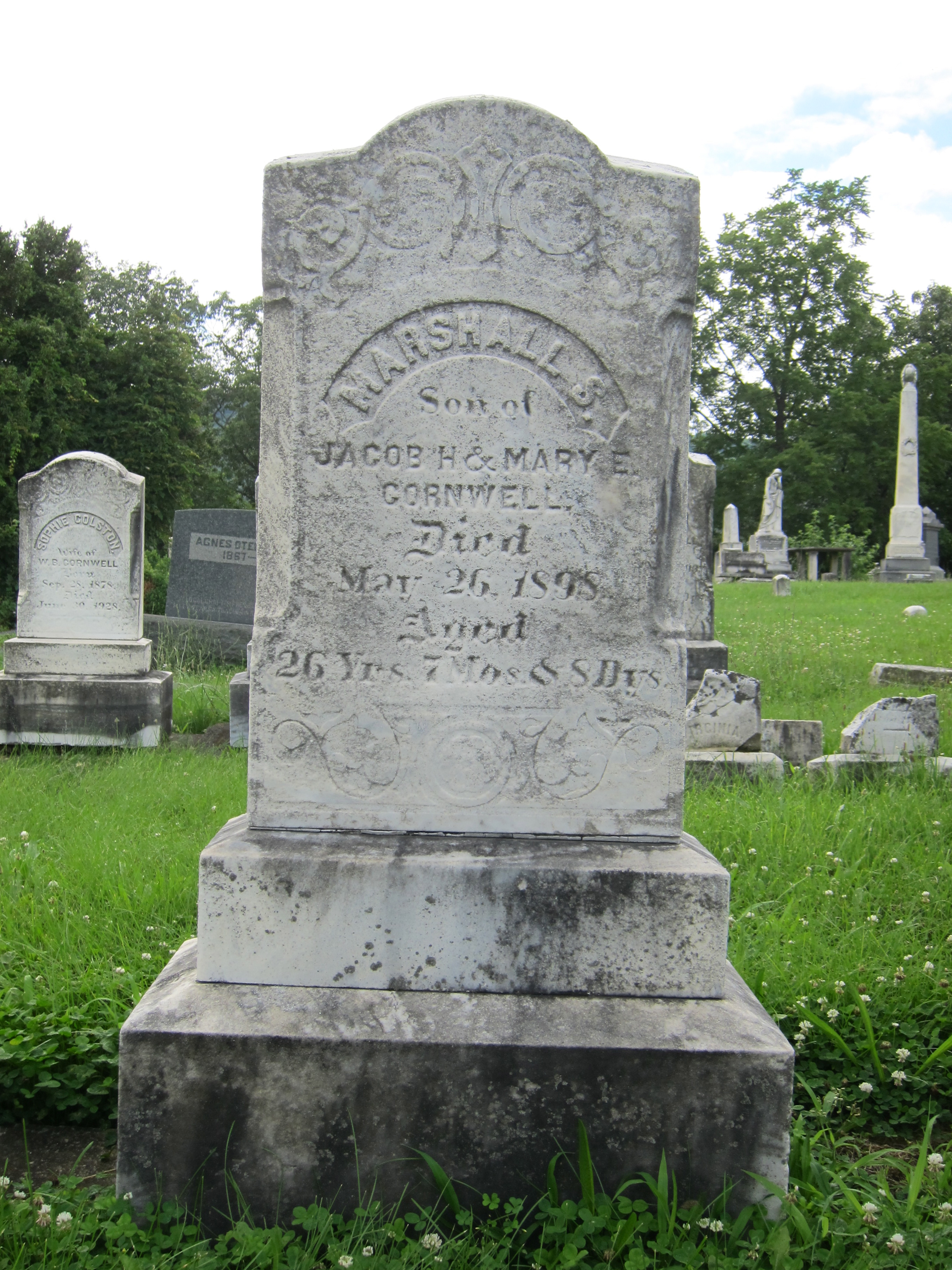
Gravestone at the interment site of Marshall S. Cornwell at Indian Mound Cemetery in Romney.

In June 1897 the Board of Regents of the West Virginia Schools for the Deaf and Blind selected Cornwell to serve as its secretary. While in Romney, Cornwell wrote a column for his brothers' Hampshire Review newspaper, entitled "Wheat and Chaff."

During the winter of 1897–98 Cornwell again traveled to a warmer climate to recuperate from his illness; this time to El Paso, Texas and other locations along the Rio Grande in Texas. He continued to write throughout his travels, and authored short essays about the new places and people he encountered. His brothers William and John Jacob Cornwell published some of these works in the Hampshire Review. While in El Paso Cornwell sent a message to his family in Romney informing them he "had given up the battle and was coming home to die." Cornwell returned to his home in Romney, where he remained during the final stages of his illness. Family members surrounded Cornwell during his last hour. He succumbed to tuberculosis and died at his home in Romney on the morning of May 26, 1898, at age 26. Cornwell was interred in Indian Mound Cemetery in Romney. During his graveside service, Reverend Washburn read Cornwell's poem "Some Day."

== Literary works ==
Cornwell addressed a variety of topics in his writing. While much of his earlier poetry was concerned with weather and the natural environment and landscapes, he authored "Only A Tramp", honoring an unnamed man killed by a Cumberland and Pennsylvania Railroad train. Author Kenneth R. Bailey described the poem as "a sensitive piece about a less fortunate man whose story would never be known but whose life was not to be scorned". According to Bailey, as his health deteriorated from his terminal illness, his later poetry was "introspective, poignant, even philosophical, but not sad".

After Cornwell's death, his brothers William and John Jacob received numerous requests for copies of his poetry. In response, and as a memorial to their brother, William and John Jacob published a collection of Cornwell's poetry in 1899 entitled Wheat and Chaff. Wheat and Chaff, the name of his column in the Hampshire Review, was a pocket-sized volume of around 95 pages, containing poetry, letters and extracts from correspondence written throughout the course of Cornwell's journeys.

According to West Virginia historian Virgil Anson Lewis in his History and Government of West Virginia (1912), Wheat and Chaff was Cornwell's "best and most enduring monument". Cornwell's poem "Success" was republished in the St. Louis Globe-Democrat, The Baltimore Sun (1904) along with an abbreviated biography, The Morning Post in Raleigh (1904), and The Railroad Trainman (1906).

== Bibliography ==
- Ambler, Charles Henry (1933). A History of West Virginia. New York: Prentice Hall. OCLC 1990398. Archived from the original on June 27, 2014 – via Google Books.
- Bailey, Kenneth R. (2011). ""…coming home to die." The brief life of Marshall S. Cornwell" (PDF). West Virginia Historical Society Magazine. Vol. XXV, no. 1. Charleston, West Virginia: West Virginia Historical Society. pp. 8–11. Archived from the original (PDF) on November 26, 2017.
- Baltimore and Ohio Railroad (1928). Baltimore and Ohio Railroad Magazine. Vol. 2. Baltimore: Baltimore and Ohio Railroad. OCLC 852772682 – via Google Books.
- Brotherhood of Railroad Trainmen (1906). The Railroad Trainman, Volume 23. Cleveland: Brotherhood of Railroad Trainmen. OCLC 7865800. Archived from the original on June 27, 2014 – via Google Books.
- Callahan, James Morton (1913). Semi-Centennial History of West Virginia: With Special Articles on Development and Resources. Charleston, West Virginia: Semi-Centennial Commission of West Virginia. OCLC 1079905 – via Internet Archive.
- Cornwell, Marshall S. (1899). Cornwell, William B.; Cornwell, John J. (eds.). Wheat and Chaff. Romney, West Virginia: Cornwell Brothers. OCLC 10830951 – via Internet Archive.
- Hampshire County Extension Homemakers (1991). Hampshire County, West Virginia: A Pictorial History. Marceline, Missouri: Hampshire County Extension Homemakers, Walsworth Publishing Company. ISBN 978-1-60354-047-6. OCLC 51940415.
- Harris, John T., ed. (1917). West Virginia Legislative Hand Book and Manual and Official Register, 1917. Charleston, West Virginia: Tribune Printing Company. OCLC 9771361. Archived from the original on January 7, 2014 – via Google Books.
- Lewis, Virgil Anson (1912). History and Government of West Virginia. New York, Cincinnati: American Book Company. OCLC 609213478. Archived from the original on April 27, 2016 – via Google Books.
- Maxwell, Hu; Swisher, Howard Llewellyn (1897). History of Hampshire County, West Virginia From Its Earliest Settlement to the Present. Morgantown, West Virginia: A. Brown Boughner, Printer. OCLC 680931891. OL 23304577M.
- Maxwell, Hu (1898). The History of Randolph County, West Virginia: From Its Earliest Settlement to the Present, Embracing Records of All the Leading Families, Reminiscences and Traditions. Morgantown, West Virginia: Acme Publishing Company. OCLC 729489200 – via Open Library.
- Munske, Roberta R.; Kerns, Wilmer L., eds. (2004). Hampshire County, West Virginia, 1754–2004. Romney, West Virginia: The Hampshire County 250th Anniversary Committee. ISBN 978-0-9715738-2-6. OCLC 55983178.
- Painter, Franklin Verzelius Newton (1907). Poets of Virginia. Richmond, Atlanta: B. F. Johnson Publishing Company. OCLC 2170843 – via Internet Archive.
- West Virginia Department of Archives and History (1906). Biennial Report of the Department of Archives and History of the State of West Virginia, Volume 2. Charleston, West Virginia: West Virginia Department of Archives and History. OCLC 1586332. Archived from the original on June 27, 2014 – via Google Books.
- West Virginia Legislature (2011). Darrell E. Holmes, Clerk of the West Virginia Senate (ed.). "West Virginia Blue Book, 2011". West Virginia Blue Book. Charleston, West Virginia: Chapman Printing. ISSN 0364-7323. OCLC 1251675.
