= 1912 West Virginia gubernatorial election =

- November 5, 1912
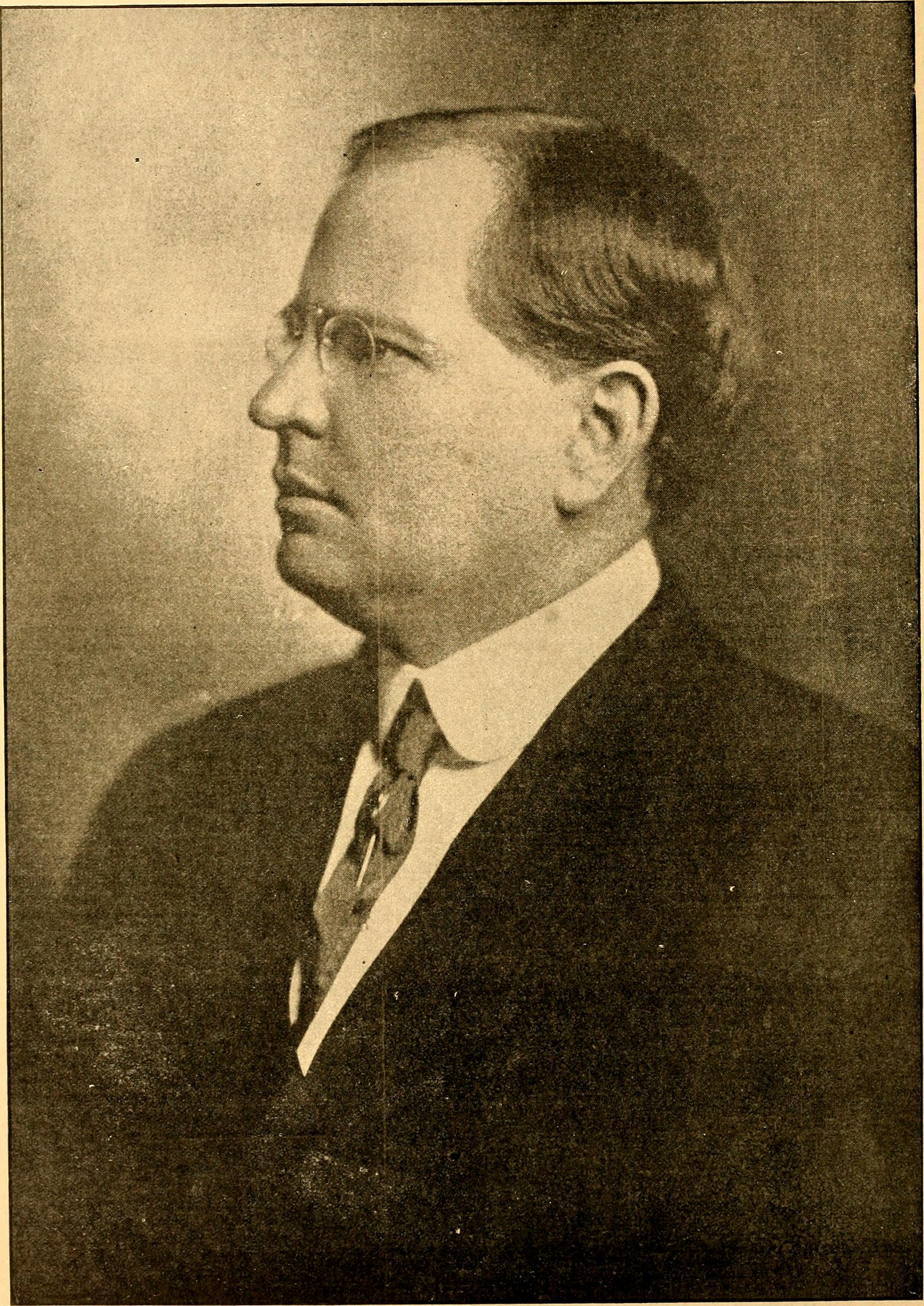

| Nominee | Henry D. Hatfield | William R. Thompson | Walter B. Hilton |
| Party | Republican | Democratic | Socialist |
| Popular vote | 128,062 | 119,292 | 15,048 |
| Percentage | 47.74% | 44.47% | 5.61% |
- County results Hatfield: 40–50% 50–60% 60–70% 70–80% Thompson: 40–50% 50–60% 60–70% 70–80%
Governor before election
William E. Glasscock
Republican
Elected Governor
Henry D. Hatfield
Republican

The 1912 West Virginia gubernatorial election took place on November 5, 1912, to elect the governor of West Virginia.

== Results ==
1912 West Virginia gubernatorial election
| Party | Candidate | Votes | % |
|---|---|---|---|
| Republican | Henry D. Hatfield | 128,062 | 47.74 |
| Democratic | William R. Thompson | 119,292 | 44.47 |
| Socialist | Walter B. Hilton | 15,048 | 5.61 |
| Prohibition | Goodloe Jackson | 5,870 | 2.19 |
| Total votes | | 268,272 | 100 |
| Republican hold | | | |
