= 1920 West Virginia gubernatorial election =

- November 2, 1920
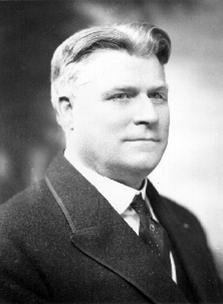

| Nominee | Ephraim F. Morgan | Arthur B. Koontz | Samuel B. Montgomery |
| Party | Republican | Democratic | Nonpartisan League |
| Popular vote | 242,237 | 185,662 | 81,330 |
| Percentage | 47.32% | 36.27% | 15.89% |
- County results Morgan: 30–40% 40–50% 50–60% 60–70% 70–80% Koontz: 40–50% 50–60% 60–70% Montgomery: 30–40%
Governor before election
John J. Cornwell
Democratic
Elected Governor
Ephraim F. Morgan
Republican

The 1920 West Virginia gubernatorial election took place on November 2, 1920, to elect the governor of West Virginia. Adam Brown Littlepage unsuccessfully ran for the Democratic nomination.

== Results ==
West Virginia gubernatorial election, 1920
| Party | Candidate | Votes | % |
|---|---|---|---|
| Republican | Ephraim F. Morgan | 242,237 | 47.32 |
| Democratic | Arthur B. Koontz | 185,662 | 36.27 |
| Nonpartisan League | Samuel B. Montgomery | 81,330 | 15.89 |
| Socialist | Matthew Samuel Holt | 2,695 | 0.53 |
| Total votes | | 511,924 | 100 |
| Republican gain from Democratic | | | |
