= David Shear (West Virginia politician) =

American businessperson and politician

Mayor of Romney, West Virginia
- In office 1951–1968
- Preceded by: John C. Linthicum
- Succeeded by: Edgar S. Baker

Member of the Romney Town Council
- In office 1933–1941

Member of the Hampshire County Public Assistance Council
- In office 1942–1957

Personal details
- Born: September 16, 1896 Congress Poland, Russian Empire
- Died: December 6, 1968 (aged 72) Hampshire Memorial Hospital, Romney, West Virginia, U.S.
- Resting place: Mikro Kodesh Beth Israel Cemetery, Baltimore, Maryland, U.S.
- Party: Democratic Party
- Spouse: Annett Burger Shear
- Relations: Nathan Shear (father); Lena Caplon Shear (mother)
- Profession: Businessperson and politician

David Shear (September 16, 1896 – December 6, 1968) was an American businessperson and politician in the U.S. state of West Virginia. Born in Congress Poland in 1896, Shear and his family emigrated to the United States in 1907, settling in Romney, West Virginia. After serving in the United States Army during World War I, Shear started his career in the mercantile business and he became the owner of Shear's Department Store in Romney. Shear's political career began in 1933 when he was elected to the Romney town council, eventually serving as mayor for nine terms from 1951 until he died in 1968. Under his leadership, the town of Romney saw significant improvements in infrastructure and community services, including enhancements to the water system and the establishment of various civic initiatives.

In addition to his mayoral duties, Shear was actively involved in numerous community organizations, including the American Legion and B'nai B'rith, and played a role in the founding of the Romney Fire Company and the Romney Lions Club. He was noted for his contributions to public service and community welfare, serving on various boards and committees throughout his life. Shear married Annett Burger in 1954 and died on December 6, 1968, leaving a legacy of civic engagement and community improvement. His remains were interred at Mikro Kodesh Beth Israel Cemetery in Baltimore.

== Early life and family ==
David Shear was born in Congress Poland, Russian Empire, on September 16, 1896. He was the son of Nathan Shear and his wife Lena Caplon Shear, and he was one of ten children—six daughters and four sons—born to the couple who survived to adulthood. His siblings included brothers Coleman and Jacob Shear and sisters Sarah Shear Kaufman and Hilda Shear Wasser. Shear's father Nathan was born in 1859, and Shear and his family resided in the village of Alside before emigrating from Poland to the United States. Shear and his family emigrated to the United States from Poland and settled in Romney, West Virginia, in 1907. Upon their arrival to the United States, Shear's father was a peddler. In Romney, Shear and his family lived with Shear's father's cousin Michael I. Bennett, who operated Bennett's Men's Store on Main Street. When Shear and his family relocated to Romney, they first stayed with the Bennett family before moving to a vacant schoolhouse, and then moving into a large house on Main Street. Shear's father established a men's and women's clothing store in Romney and another store in Keyser, West Virginia, before dying in Baltimore in 1931. Shear's mother Lena later died in Washington, D.C., in 1950.

Shear attended and graduated from Romney Public School; however, he did not receive a high school education because Romney did not have a public high school then. He started his career delivering express packages from the Wells Fargo office at the Romney train station to area businesses and residences. Shear first performed these deliveries using a spring wagon drawn by his black mare named Fancy, and then he exchanged his mare for a Ford Model T truck, which he operated until 1917.

Shear entered the United States Army in 1917, and he was discharged in 1919. In 1919, Shear served on a committee that organized Soldiers' Day for returning World War I soldiers in Romney.

Following his discharge, Shear entered the mercantile business in 1919, and in 1920, Shear became the owner and manager of Shear's Department Store at 24 West Main Street in Romney. Shear bought the lot at this location and erected the building housing his store. Shear and his brothers made the blocks to build his store using a hand machine.

== Political career ==
=== Romney town council ===
In 1933, Shear was elected to a seat on Romney's town council, and on July 3 of that year, he participated in his first regular monthly council meeting and was appointed to the council's ordinance committee. On July 6, 1936, Shear was appointed to serve on the council's street, water, and ordinance committees. In total, Shear served on the Romney town council for five terms from 1933 to 1941. (Note: Shear served on the Romney town council for five terms from 1933 to 1941, according to the Hampshire Review, the Cumberland Evening Times, and the following West Virginia Blue Book issues: 1935, 1936, 1938, 1939, and 1940.)

=== Hampshire County Public Assistance Council ===
In 1942, Shear became a member of Hampshire County's Public Assistance Council, and he served as the council's chairperson from 1943 to 1957. (Note: Shear served as a member of Hampshire County's Public Assistance Council from 1942 to 1952 and as its chairperson from 1943 to 1957, according to the following West Virginia Blue Book issues: 1942, 1943, 1944, 1945, 1946, 1947, 1948, 1949, 1950, 1951, 1952, 1953, 1954, 1955, 1956, and 1957.)

=== Mayor of Romney ===
Shear served as mayor of Romney for nine terms, from 1951 until his death in 1968. (Note: Shear served as mayor of Romney for nine terms from 1951 until his death in 1968, according to Historic Hampshire, the Cumberland Evening Times, and the following West Virginia Blue Book issues: 1951, 1952, 1953, 1954, 1955, 1956, 1957, 1958, and 1968.)

At the time Shear commenced his first term as mayor, the Romney municipal government was in debt and its physical equipment consisted of a couple of old trucks. Under his leadership, Romney underwent improvements to its water system, streets, sewage disposal system, and street lighting.

In December 1954, Shear proclaimed 15 December as "Safe Driving Day" in Romney. In January 1958, Shear proclaimed the week of February 2, 1958, as Religious Emphasis Week for Romney citizens to engage in regular public worship at the church or synagogue of their faith, daily family prayer, and religious education of children. In May 1961, Shear endorsed and offered his municipal administration's support to the Romney Volunteer Fire Company proposal to construct a public swimming pool at School Street and West Rosemary Lane. That same month, he encouraged Romney and Hampshire County residents to participate in Governor Wally Barron's "Keep West Virginia Clean and Green" highway clean-up initiative, which was initiated in Hampshire County by a clean-up parade in Romney.

In March 1962, Shear officially opened the town's Easter Seals campaign by purchasing the first sheet of easter seals from the Hampshire County Society for Crippled Children and Adults and in his mayoral proclamation for this event, he stated, "By uniting in spirit and action through the Easter Seal Campaign, we help restore strength, hope, and financial independence to the handicapped."

Shear was mayor of Romney when the town celebrated its bicentennial anniversary in the summer of 1962, and he also served on the board of directors of Romney Bicentennial, Inc., which was a non-profit corporation created in 1961 to organize, direct, and conduct the bicentennial celebration. In his letter to mark the occasion in Romney Bicentennial, 1762 – 1862 – 1962, Shear wrote:

To Our Friends and Guests:

It is my privilege as Mayor of the Town of Romney to extend the official welcome of the town to all our visitors and friends who will be with us on the occasion of the celebration of Romney's two hundredth birthday.

The people of Romney and Hampshire County have worked hard to make this celebration a memorable one. We are proud of our rich heritage and our present day accomplishments and we hope that you will enjoy them with us.

Very truly yours,

David Shear

Mayor

In June 1968, under Shear's leadership, Romney completed further improvements to its municipal water system and water plant, and the town received $125,000 in direct grants and $25,000 in supplementary grants from the United States Department of Commerce Economic Development Administration for the project. These improvements to the Romney municipal water system attracted the Kinney Shoe Company factory, and enabled expansions to the West Virginia Schools for the Deaf and the Blind and Hampshire Memorial Hospital.

=== Selective Service System board ===
While serving as mayor, Shear also served as a member of the West Virginia Selective Service System's Local Board No. 56 for Hampshire County, beginning in 1952, and received a five-year certificate of appreciation for his service to the system in 1957. In May 1957, Shear announced his intention to seek reelection as mayor for a third term. He served on the board until 1958. (Note: Shear served as a member of West Virginia Selective Service System Local Board No. 56, Hampshire County, from 1952 to 1958, according to the following West Virginia Blue Book issues: 1952, 1953, 1954, 1955, 1956, 1957, and 1958.)

== Community and civic affairs ==
Shear was a member of many community and international organizations, including B'nai B'rith; Romney Lions Club; Romney Fire Company; American Legion, Hampshire Post No. 91; Loyal Order of Moose, Romney Lodge 1371; Boy Scouts of America, Potomac Council; the Hampshire County Welfare Board; the Hampshire County Draft Board; and the Hampshire Memorial Hospital board of directors. When the hospital was built on Depot Street in 1957, Shear served as a member of its inaugural board of directors. On July 10, 1964, Shear became an incorporator of the Hampshire Development Corporation. Shear played an active role in organizing the Romney Fire Company, serving as its vice president, and was a charter member of the Romney Lions Club in 1947. Shear was a member of Clinton Lodge 86 Ancient Free and Accepted Masons, and in 1967, he was awarded a 50-year service pin.

=== American Legion ===
Following his service in World War I, Shear became an organizer and charter member of Romney's American Legion Hampshire Post No. 91 in 1921. In 1931, he was selected to serve on the American Legion's West Virginia Department foreign relations committee, representing the department's 10th district. In 1933, Shear served as the Hampshire County representative for the American Legion West Virginia Department initiative to compile a record of graves for veterans of all wars in Hampshire County. In 1944 and 1945, Shear served as the American Legion West Virginia Department's 10th district commander. Shear served as district commander from 1945 to 1946, and commander of Romney's Hampshire Post No. 91 from 1947 to 1949. In February 1958, Shear was appointed a general member of the American Legion's National Distinguished Guests Committee by National Commander John S. Gleason Jr. He also served as trustee for the American Legion building in Romney. In total, Shear attended 40 consecutive national conventions, beginning with the first one held in Paris in 1927.

== Other business ventures ==
In January 1956, Shear was elected to the board of directors of the Romney Federal Credit Union. He was reelected to the board of directors in 1964.

== Personal life ==
Shear was a member of the Beth Jacob Congregation in Cumberland, Maryland, and served as vice president of the synagogue. On March 24, 1954, Shear married Annett Burger of Baltimore in the study of Rabbi Joseph Schimelman in Cumberland, Maryland. Prior to his marriage, Shear had obtained his marriage license at the Allegany County Courthouse.

== Later life, death, and legacy ==
In 1957, Shear stated that he was the only Jewish person residing in the town of Romney. In November 1968, the town of Romney held a testimonial dinner at the American Legion building to honor Shear's service to the community and present him with a silver tea service as a token of affection and esteem. Shear died on December 6, 1968, at Hampshire Memorial Hospital in Romney. He was interred on December 8, 1968, at Mikro Kodesh Beth Israel Cemetery on Bowleys Lane in Baltimore. Shear and his family were buried at this cemetery, and not in their community of Romney, in keeping with Jewish burial tradition.

== Bibliography ==
- Ailes, John C., ed. (1962). Romney Bicentennial, 1762 – 1862 – 1962. Romney, West Virginia: Hampshire Review. OCLC 24620033.
- Brannon, Selden W. (1976). Historic Hampshire: A Symposium of Hampshire County and Its People, Past and Present. Parsons, West Virginia: McClain Printing Company. ISBN 978-0-87012-236-1. OCLC 3121468 – via Internet Archive.
- Shinedling, Abraham I. (1963). West Virginia Jewry: Origins and History 1850–1958. Vol. II. Philadelphia: Press of Maurice Jacobs, Inc. OCLC 1391892428 – via Internet Archive.
- West Virginia Legislature (1935). Charles Lively, Clerk of the West Virginia Senate (ed.). West Virginia Blue Book, 1935 (PDF). Charleston, West Virginia: Jarrett Printing Company. ISSN 0364-7323. OCLC 1251675. Archived (PDF) from the original on October 15, 2023.
- West Virginia Legislature (1936). Charles Lively, Clerk of the West Virginia Senate (ed.). West Virginia Blue Book, 1936 (PDF). Charleston, West Virginia: Jarrett Printing Company. ISSN 0364-7323. OCLC 1251675. Archived (PDF) from the original on December 22, 2022.
- West Virginia Legislature (1938). Charles Lively, Clerk of the West Virginia Senate (ed.). West Virginia Blue Book, 1938 (PDF). Charleston, West Virginia: Jarrett Printing Company. ISSN 0364-7323. OCLC 1251675. Archived (PDF) from the original on October 15, 2023.
- West Virginia Legislature (1939). Charles Lively, Clerk of the West Virginia Senate (ed.). West Virginia Blue Book, 1939 (PDF). Charleston, West Virginia: Jarrett Printing Company. ISSN 0364-7323. OCLC 1251675. Archived (PDF) from the original on October 15, 2023.
- West Virginia Legislature (1940). Charles Lively, Clerk of the West Virginia Senate (ed.). West Virginia Blue Book, 1940 (PDF). Charleston, West Virginia: Jarrett Printing Company. ISSN 0364-7323. OCLC 1251675. Archived (PDF) from the original on October 15, 2023.
- West Virginia Legislature (1942). A. Hale Watkins, Clerk of the West Virginia Senate (ed.). West Virginia Blue Book, 1942 (PDF). Charleston, West Virginia: Jarrett Printing Company. ISSN 0364-7323. OCLC 1251675. Archived (PDF) from the original on October 15, 2023.
- West Virginia Legislature (1943). Fred B. Watkins, Clerk of the West Virginia Senate (ed.). West Virginia Blue Book, 1943 (PDF). Charleston, West Virginia: Jarrett Printing Company. ISSN 0364-7323. OCLC 1251675. Archived (PDF) from the original on October 15, 2023.
- West Virginia Legislature (1944). Fred B. Watkins, Clerk of the West Virginia Senate (ed.). West Virginia Blue Book, 1944 (PDF). Charleston, West Virginia: Jarrett Printing Company. ISSN 0364-7323. OCLC 1251675. Archived (PDF) from the original on April 23, 2021.
- West Virginia Legislature (1945). J. Howard Myers, Clerk of the West Virginia Senate (ed.). West Virginia Blue Book, 1945 (PDF). Charleston, West Virginia: Jarrett Printing Company. ISSN 0364-7323. OCLC 1251675. Archived (PDF) from the original on October 20, 2021.
- West Virginia Legislature (1946). J. Howard Myers, Clerk of the West Virginia Senate (ed.). West Virginia Blue Book, 1946 (PDF). Charleston, West Virginia: Jarrett Printing Company. ISSN 0364-7323. OCLC 1251675. Archived (PDF) from the original on April 23, 2021.
- West Virginia Legislature (1947). J. Howard Myers, Clerk of the West Virginia Senate (ed.). West Virginia Blue Book, 1947 (PDF). Charleston, West Virginia: Jarrett Printing Company. ISSN 0364-7323. OCLC 1251675. Archived (PDF) from the original on April 27, 2021.
- West Virginia Legislature (1948). J. Howard Myers, Clerk of the West Virginia Senate (ed.). West Virginia Blue Book, 1948 (PDF). Charleston, West Virginia: Jarrett Printing Company. ISSN 0364-7323. OCLC 1251675. Archived (PDF) from the original on April 23, 2021.
- West Virginia Legislature (1949). J. Howard Myers, Clerk of the West Virginia Senate (ed.). West Virginia Blue Book, 1949 (PDF). Charleston, West Virginia: Jarrett Printing Company. ISSN 0364-7323. OCLC 1251675. Archived (PDF) from the original on October 15, 2023.
- West Virginia Legislature (1950). J. Howard Myers, Clerk of the West Virginia Senate (ed.). West Virginia Blue Book, 1950 (PDF). Charleston, West Virginia: Jarrett Printing Company. ISSN 0364-7323. OCLC 1251675. Archived (PDF) from the original on October 15, 2023.
- West Virginia Legislature (1951). J. Howard Myers, Clerk of the West Virginia Senate (ed.). West Virginia Blue Book, 1951 (PDF). Charleston, West Virginia: Jarrett Printing Company. ISSN 0364-7323. OCLC 1251675. Archived (PDF) from the original on October 15, 2023.
- West Virginia Legislature (1952). J. Howard Myers, Clerk of the West Virginia Senate (ed.). West Virginia Blue Book, 1952 (PDF). Charleston, West Virginia: Jarrett Printing Company. ISSN 0364-7323. OCLC 1251675. Archived (PDF) from the original on October 15, 2023.
- West Virginia Legislature (1953). J. Howard Myers, Clerk of the West Virginia Senate (ed.). West Virginia Blue Book, 1953 (PDF). Charleston, West Virginia: Jarrett Printing Company. ISSN 0364-7323. OCLC 1251675. Archived (PDF) from the original on September 10, 2023.
- West Virginia Legislature (1954). J. Howard Myers, Clerk of the West Virginia Senate (ed.). West Virginia Blue Book, 1954 (PDF). Charleston, West Virginia: Jarrett Printing Company. ISSN 0364-7323. OCLC 1251675. Archived (PDF) from the original on January 3, 2021.
- West Virginia Legislature (1955). J. Howard Myers, Clerk of the West Virginia Senate (ed.). West Virginia Blue Book, 1955 (PDF). Charleston, West Virginia: Jarrett Printing Company. ISSN 0364-7323. OCLC 1251675. Archived (PDF) from the original on January 3, 2021.
- West Virginia Legislature (1956). J. Howard Myers, Clerk of the West Virginia Senate (ed.). West Virginia Blue Book, 1956 (PDF). Charleston, West Virginia: Jarrett Printing Company. ISSN 0364-7323. OCLC 1251675. Archived (PDF) from the original on October 16, 2023.
- West Virginia Legislature (1957). J. Howard Myers, Clerk of the West Virginia Senate (ed.). West Virginia Blue Book, 1957 (PDF). Charleston, West Virginia: Jarrett Printing Company. ISSN 0364-7323. OCLC 1251675. Archived (PDF) from the original on October 16, 2020.
- West Virginia Legislature (1958). J. Howard Myers, Clerk of the West Virginia Senate (ed.). West Virginia Blue Book, 1958 (PDF). Charleston, West Virginia: Jarrett Printing Company. ISSN 0364-7323. OCLC 1251675. Archived (PDF) from the original on October 15, 2023.
- West Virginia Legislature (1968). J. Howard Myers, Clerk of the West Virginia Senate (ed.). West Virginia Blue Book, 1968 (PDF). Charleston, West Virginia: Jarrett Printing Company. ISSN 0364-7323. OCLC 1251675. Archived (PDF) from the original on September 15, 2021.

Political offices
Preceded by John C. Linthicum	Mayor of Romney, West Virginia; 1951–1968	Succeeded by Edgar S. Baker
