= William B. Cornwell =

American lawyer (1864–1926)

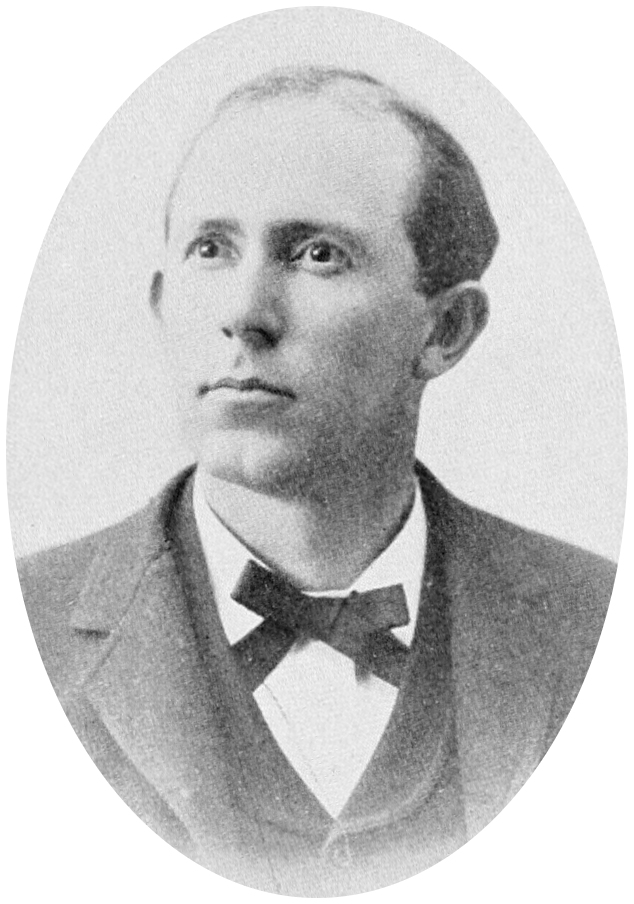
- Portrait of William B. Cornwell as a young lawyer, prior to 1897.

Prosecuting Attorney for Hampshire County
- In office 1892–1900
- Preceded by: Robert W. Dailey, Jr.
- Succeeded by: Joshua Soule Zimmerman

Personal details
- Born: November 25, 1864 Hampshire County, West Virginia, United States
- Died: April 8, 1926 (aged 61) Romney, West Virginia, United States
- Resting place: Indian Mound Cemetery, Romney, West Virginia, United States
- Party: Democratic Party
- Spouse(s): Nannie V. Dellinger; Sophie H. Colston
- Relations: Jacob H. Cornwell (father); Mary Eleanor Taylor (mother); John J. Cornwell (brother); Marshall S. Cornwell (brother); Stephen Ailes (great-nephew)
- Education: West Virginia University College of Law
- Profession: lawyer, businessperson, newspaper editor and publisher, and railroad and timber executive

William Benjamin Cornwell (November 25, 1864 – April 8, 1926) was an American lawyer, businessperson, newspaper editor and publisher, and railroad and timber executive in the U.S. state of West Virginia. He was an older brother of writer and newspaper publisher Marshall S. Cornwell (1871–1898) and of West Virginia Governor John J. Cornwell (1867–1953).

Cornwell studied jurisprudence at the West Virginia University College of Law, and afterward began practicing law in Romney. In 1890, he and his brother, John J. Cornwell, purchased The Review and South Branch Intelligencer newspapers. Following their acquisition of the South Branch Intelligencer, they renamed the newspaper Hampshire Review. In 1900, Cornwell sold his ownership in the Hampshire Review to his brother John. While he owned the newspaper, Cornwell served as the Prosecuting Attorney for Hampshire County (1892–1900). In addition to serving as Prosecuting Attorney, he served as the Commissioner of School Lands for Hampshire County in 1900. In 1902, he relocated to Fairmont, where he engaged in the practice of law until 1910.

He and his brother, John were corporators and shareholders of the South Branch Boom and Lumber Company following its incorporation in 1901. They were also corporators and shareholders of the Potomac White Sand Company of Green Spring following its incorporation in 1902. Cornwell served as the president of the Hampshire Southern Railroad which was constructed under his leadership, beginning in June 1909, and he continued to operate it until 1911 when it was purchased by the Moorefield and Virginia Railroad Company.

Cornwell organized, and became the president of, the Winchester and Western Railroad which had been incorporated in 1916. In addition to serving as the company's president, he also served on its board of directors. In 1921, he also organized a subsidiary, Winchester Lumber Corporation, for the purpose of developing the timber resources of Hampshire and Hardy counties in West Virginia and Frederick County in Virginia. Cornwell served as the president and general manager of the Winchester Lumber Corporation. He died in 1926 in Romney, West Virginia and was interred next to his first wife Nannie and second wife Sophie at Indian Mound Cemetery.

== Early life and family ==
William Benjamin Cornwell was born in Hampshire County, West Virginia on November 25, 1864, the eldest child and son of Jacob H. Cornwell and his wife Mary Eleanor Taylor. Shortly after his birth, his parents moved the family west to Ritchie County, West Virginia, where his mother's twin brother John Taylor and uncle Eli Taylor were residing. Cornwell and his family returned to the Cornwell family farm on South Branch Mountain (also known as Jersey Mountain) in Hampshire County in 1869.

== Legal education and career ==
Cornwell studied jurisprudence at the West Virginia University College of Law and graduated from the institution. He commenced practicing law in Romney, and shortly thereafter, was elected Prosecuting Attorney for Hampshire County in 1892, and continued to serve in that position until 1900. In addition to serving as Prosecuting Attorney, Cornwell served as the Commissioner of School Lands for Hampshire County in 1900. His brother John Jacob studied law in Cornwell's law office in Romney, and was admitted to the state bar association in 1894.

On June 30, 1891, Cornwell married Nannie V. Dellinger (1869–1893) of Middletown, Virginia. They had two children before her death on June 29, 1893. Cornwell's second marriage was to Sophie H. Colston (1878–1928) in Martinsburg, West Virginia on June 14, 1899. She was the daughter of W. B. Colston and his wife Minnie Colston of Martinsburg. Cornwell relocated to Fairmont in 1902, and engaged in the practice of law there. In 1906, lawyer Raymond J. Abbaticchio arrived in Fairmont and entered Cornwell's law office and later became a junior member of the law firm of Cornwell & Abbaticchio. They maintained their partnership until Cornwell's departure from Fairmont in 1910.

== Newspaper publishing career ==
In 1890, shortly after Cornwell began practicing law in Romney, he and his brother John Jacob Cornwell purchased the newspaper The Review from C. F. Poland, who assured the newspaper's subscribers in a November 6, 1890, farewell editorial that the new owners would continue to publish the Review while following "Jeffersonian principles." At the time they purchased the newspaper, The Review used the Wirgman Building's second floor for its offices and printing plant. Later that same year, they purchased The Review's rival newspaper in Romney, the South Branch Intelligencer. Following this acquisition, Cornwell and his brother added Hampshire to the newspaper's name and included and the South Branch Intelligencer in smaller print within the masthead underneath The Hampshire Review. The Hampshire Review continued to operate from the second floor of the Wirgman Building until 1895 when Cornwell and his brother relocated the newspaper's office and printing plant to the first floor of their new brick building on West Main Street. In 1900, Cornwell sold his ownership in the Hampshire Review to his brother, and in 1902, he moved to Fairmont.

== Business and railroad career ==
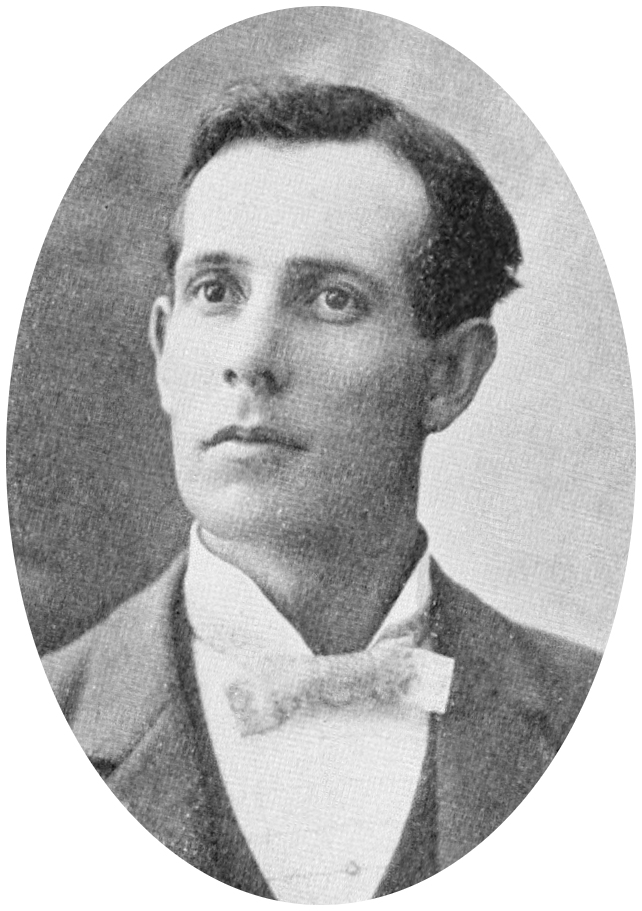
Portrait of Cornwell's brother, John Jacob Cornwell, prior to 1897. Cornwell and his brother were partners in various business ventures prior to John Jacob Cornwell serving as Governor of West Virginia.

Cornwell and brother John Jacob were corporators and shareholders of the South Branch Boom and Lumber Company following the issue of its incorporation charter on May 1, 1901. Its principal office was located in Romney, West Virginia. The company constructed a log boom on the South Branch Potomac River to collect and contain floating logs timbered from nearby forests. They were also corporators and shareholders of the Potomac White Sand Company of Green Spring, West Virginia, following the issue of its incorporation charter on May 10, 1902. This company engaged in the mining, preparation, manufacturing, and distribution of sand and other extracted minerals.

=== Hampshire Southern Railroad Company ===
On August 20, 1906, the Hampshire Southern Railroad Company (HSRC) was incorporated to facilitate the construction and operation of a rail line along the south branch of the Potomac River connecting Grant and Hardy counties to the Baltimore and Ohio Railroad at Green Spring via West Romney Station at Romney. In addition to Cornwell, the company's corporators included his brother John Jacob, Duncan Sinclar, and his law firm partner Raymond J. Abbaticchio. Cornwell served as president of the HSRC whose track was laid under his leadership beginning in June 1909. The HSRC line was constructed 18 miles (29 km) from the southern terminus of the Baltimore and Ohio Railroad's South Branch line at West Romney Station to McNeill; operations began along this completed section on April 20, 1910. Later in 1910, both freight and passenger service commenced between Romney and Moorefield. By October 1910, the remainder of the rail line was completed and operations began from Moorefield to Petersburg.

In May 1910, Cornwell and his wife purchased a property known as Mill Meadows, located at the confluence of Mill Creek and the South Branch Potomac River near Vanderlip. Cornwell made significant improvements to the property, including the construction of a bridge over Mill Creek connecting the residence to U.S. Route 50, and the building of additions to the residence using materials from the property's mill, which had been razed around 1908. Cornwell also built a barn and several other ancillary structures on the property. He and his wife sold Mill Meadows in August 1920 to James H. Blue.

The HSRC continued to operate this rail line until December 11, 1911, when it was purchased by the Moorefield and Virginia Railroad Company. The Moorefield and Virginia Railroad Company assumed the $700,000 mortgage against the rail line. Cornwell and Eugene Ailes, the son-in-law of his brother John Jacob, served as officers of the conveyancing company for the transaction. The Moorefield and Virginia Railroad Company subsequently transferred the rail line to the Baltimore and Ohio Railroad Company in November 1913.

=== Winchester and Western Railroad Company ===
Cornwell organized and became the president of the Winchester and Western Railroad Company (WWRC) which had been incorporated in Virginia on August 16, 1916. It received its charter on August 31, 1916, to build and operate a rail line connecting Wardensville and the Lost River valley of West Virginia to the Baltimore and Ohio Railroad and the Cumberland Valley Railroad at Winchester, Virginia. In addition to serving as the railroad company's president, Cornwell also served on the board of directors of the WWRC. Fellow Romney lawyer and businessman Joshua Soule Zimmerman served as the company's secretary. Residents of Winchester and Frederick County, Virginia purchased $75,000 worth of ownership interest in the WWRC prior to its construction. By May 17, 1921, the Inter-Mountain Construction Company had completed 40 miles (64 km) of the WWRC line between Winchester and Wardensville. The line was serviced by gasoline engine locomotives for hauling freight and passengers.

=== Winchester Lumber Corporation ===
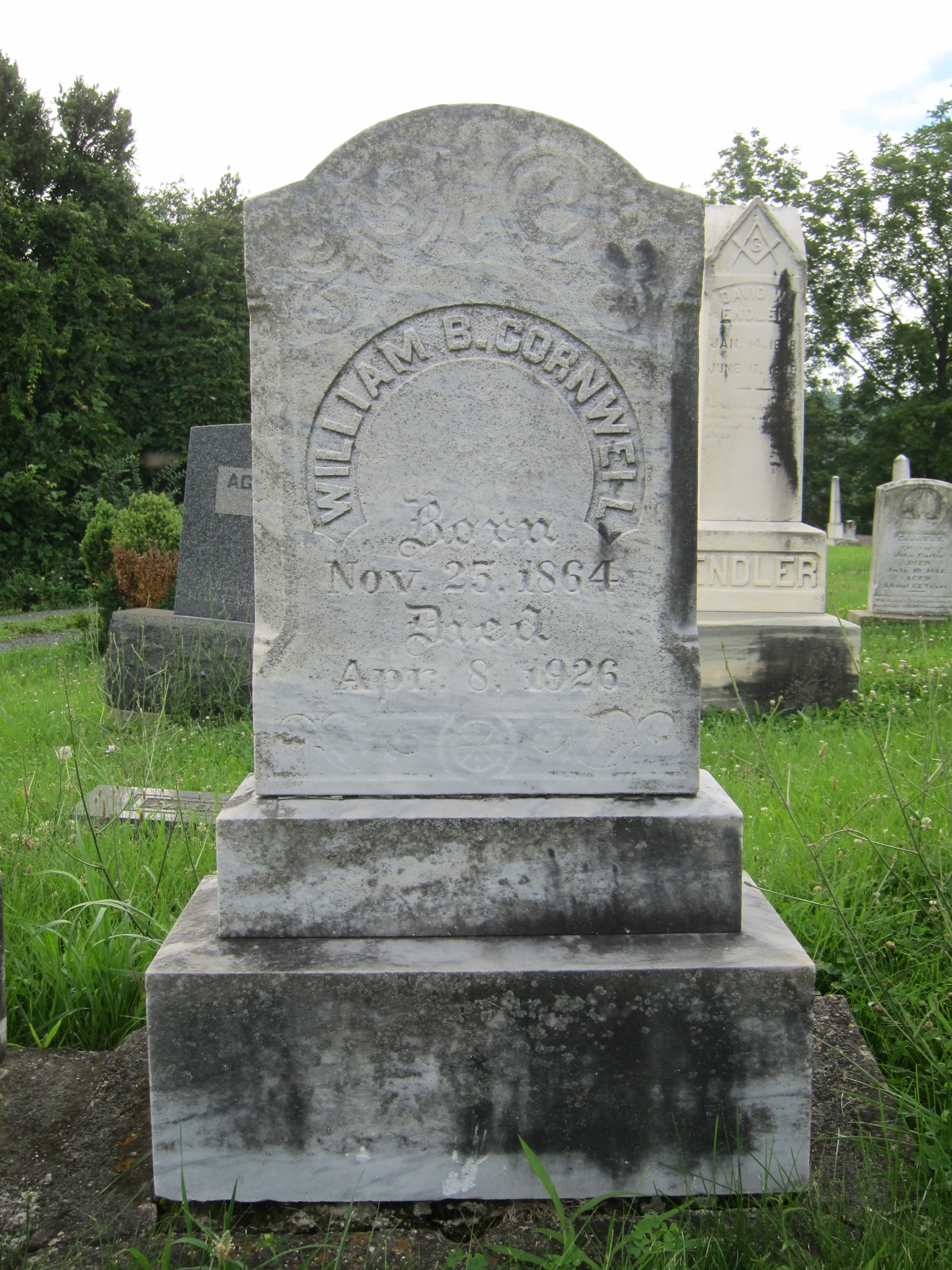
Gravestone at the interment site of William B. Cornwell at Indian Mound Cemetery in Romney, West Virginia.

Cornwell organized the subsidiary Winchester Lumber Corporation (WLC) in 1921 for the purpose of developing the timber resources of Hampshire and Hardy counties in West Virginia and Frederick County in Virginia. Under his leadership, the WLC acquired 35,000 acres (14,000 ha; 55 sq mi) of tracts of mountainous woodlands in Hardy, Hampshire, and Frederick counties in proximity to the Winchester and Western Railroad line. Cornwell served as the president and general manager of the WLC, and planned the construction of twenty sawmills, several general woodworking and finishing plants, power stations, and a cooperage plant. He operated the WLC from the Winchester and Western Railroad Building in Winchester. Due to illness, Cornwell resigned as president and general manager of the company in the summer of 1925. In October 1925, after four years of operation, the Winchester Lumber Corporation filed for bankruptcy with debts estimated at $711,000 and assets worth slightly more than half of its debts. The Winchester and Western Railroad Company was unaffected by the bankruptcy of its subsidiary.

== Later life and death ==
As a member of the Winchester business community, Cornwell was a founding member and director of the Winchester Rotary International Club in 1921, and served as chairman of the club's initial nominating committee.

In December 1923, while visiting the Winchester residence of W. A. Baker, a fellow director of the Winchester and Western Railroad, Cornwell was rendered unconscious after a large longcase clock in a hallway toppled over, striking him on the head, and knocking him down. The longcase clock inflicted a severe wound to the back of Cornwell's head. He received first aid treatment from a physician present at the residence and was taken to his Winchester home where he regained consciousness.

Cornwell died as a result of ventricular hypertrophy at 5:00 p.m. on April 8, 1926, in Romney, West Virginia. Dr. Robert W. Dailey had attended Cornwell from March 13, 1925, until his death. Cornwell was interred on April 10, 1926, next to his first wife Nannie and second wife Sophie at Indian Mound Cemetery in Romney.

== Bibliography ==
- Baltimore and Ohio Railroad Company (1920). Baltimore and Ohio Magazine, Volume 8, Issues 1–12. Baltimore: Baltimore and Ohio Railroad. OCLC 852772682. Archived from the original on January 7, 2014 – via Google Books.
- Brannon, Selden W., ed. (1976). Historic Hampshire: A Symposium of Hampshire County and Its People, Past and Present. Parsons, West Virginia: McClain Printing Company. ISBN 978-0-87012-236-1. OCLC 3121468.
- Butcher, Bernard L. (1912). Genealogical and Personal History of the Upper Monongahela Valley, West Virginia. Baltimore: Clearfield Company, Inc. ISBN 978-0-8063-4849-0. OCLC 774029616. Archived from the original on January 7, 2014 – via Google Books.
- Camp, Walter Mason (1916). Railway Review, Volume 59. Chicago: W. A. Smith. OCLC 1606700. Archived from the original on October 31, 2013 – via Google Books.
- Hampshire County Extension Homemakers (1991). Hampshire County, West Virginia: A Pictorial History. Marceline, Missouri: Hampshire County Extension Homemakers, Walsworth Publishing Company. ISBN 978-1-60354-047-6. OCLC 51940415.
- Harris, John T. (Clerk of the West Virginia State Senate) (1917). West Virginia Legislative Hand Book and Manual and Official Register, 1917. Charleston, West Virginia: Tribune Printing Company. OCLC 9771361. Archived from the original on January 7, 2014 – via Google Books.
- Maxwell, Hu; Swisher, Howard Llewellyn (1897). History of Hampshire County, West Virginia From Its Earliest Settlement to the Present. Morgantown, West Virginia: A. Brown Boughner, Printer. OCLC 680931891. OL 23304577M.
- Munske, Roberta R.; Kerns, Wilmer L., eds. (2004). Hampshire County, West Virginia, 1754–2004. Romney, West Virginia: The Hampshire County 250th Anniversary Committee. ISBN 978-0-9715738-2-6. OCLC 55983178.
- Poor, Henry Varnum (1922). Poor's Manual of Railroads, Volume 55. Poor's Manual Company. OCLC 5585553. Archived from the original on November 5, 2013 – via Google Books.
- The Iron Age (1922). "The Iron Age, Volume 109". Iron Age. Chilton Company. ISSN 0021-1508. OCLC 5257259. Archived from the original on January 7, 2014 – via Google Books.
- United States Railroad and Mining Register Company (1906). The Railway World, Volume 50. Philadelphia: United States Railroad and Mining Register Company. OCLC 7865790. Archived from the original on October 11, 2013 – via Google Books.
- Virginia State Corporation Commission (1917). Annual Report of the State Corporation Commission of Virginia. Compilations from Returns of Railroads, Canals, Electric Railways and Other Corporate Companies. Virginia State Corporation Commission. OCLC 780068890. Archived from the original on November 3, 2013 – via Google Books.
- West Virginia (1902). Public Documents, Volume 1. Government of West Virginia. OCLC 608326018. Archived from the original on April 8, 2016 – via Google Books.
- West Virginia Auditor's Office; West Virginia Insurance Department; Office of the State Bank Examiner (1901). The Auditor of the State of West Virginia for the Years 1899–1900. Charleston, West Virginia: Butler Printing Company. OCLC 682353179. Archived from the original on October 29, 2013 – via Google Books.

Legal offices
Preceded by Robert W. Dailey, Jr.	Prosecuting Attorney for Hampshire County; 1892–1900	Succeeded by Joshua Soule Zimmerman
