= Ira E. Robinson =

American judge and politician

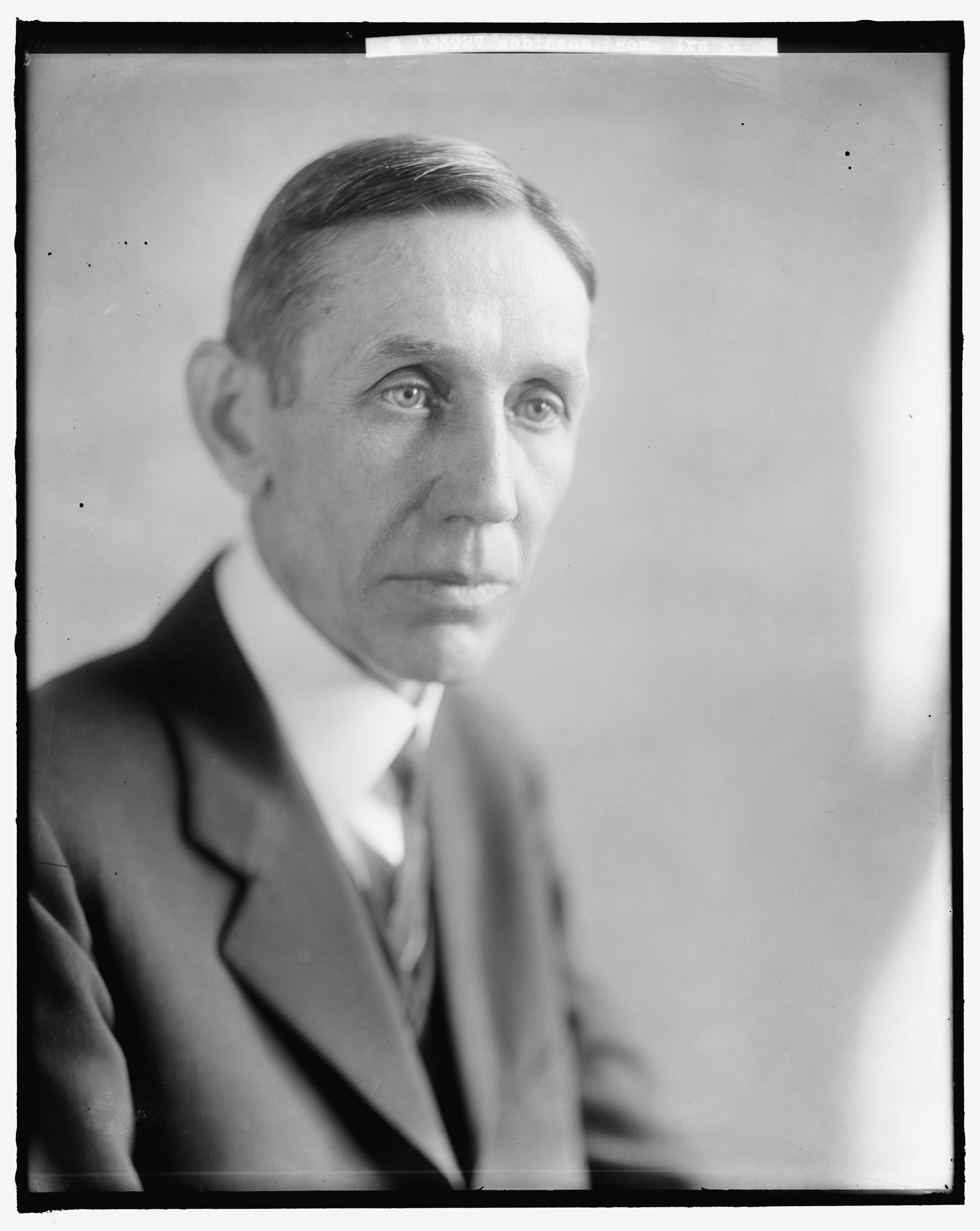
- Portrait by Harris & Ewing, c. 1928

Member of the Federal Radio Commission
- In office March 1928 – January 15, 1932
- President: Calvin Coolidge; Herbert Hoover
- Preceded by: William H. G. Bullard
- Succeeded by: Thad H. Brown

Justice of the Supreme Court of Appeals of West Virginia
- In office October 15, 1907 – October 26, 1915
- Preceded by: Joseph M. Sanders
- Succeeded by: John W. Mason

Member of the West Virginia Senate from the 11th district
- In office December 1, 1902 – December 1, 1904 Serving with Charles W. Swisher
- Succeeded by: Joseph H. McDermott

Personal details
- Born: Ira Ellsworth Robinson; September 16, 1869 Taylor County, West Virginia
- Died: October 28, 1951 (aged 82) Philippi, West Virginia
- Party: Republican

Ira Ellsworth Robinson (September 16, 1869 – October 28, 1951) was an American politician, judge, and the second chairman of the Federal Radio Commission (1928–32).

== Biography ==
Robinson was born in Taylor County, West Virginia, near Grafton. He graduated from the Fairmont State Normal School in 1889 and then studied law, being admitted to the bar in 1891. From 1896 to 1900, he was the Taylor County prosecuting attorney. He was a member of the Board of Regents of the State Normal School system from 1901 to 1907. Robinson was elected to the West Virginia Senate for the 1903-04 session and was then appointed to the Supreme Court of Appeals of West Virginia in 1907, being elected in 1908 to the remainder of the unexpired term (through 1915).

In 1916, Robinson was the Republican nominee for governor of West Virginia, losing by a narrow margin to Democrat John J. Cornwell. In 1917-18, he served as the chairman of the draft board for northern West Virginia. In 1921, he was put in charge of the administration of the federal War Minerals Relief Act.

In 1920, Robinson purchased an 1870 mansion in Barbour County which he renamed Adaland Mansion after his wife; it is now a museum. It was listed on the National Register of Historic Places in 1995.

In March 1928, Robinson was appointed to the Federal Radio Commission after the death of its first chairman William H. G. Bullard on November 24, 1927 and became its second chairman; Robinson served until his resignation in January 1932. He presided over the 1928 reallocation known as General Order 40, although he opposed it as too favorable to network radio stations. He helped mold much of the early regulation of radio in the US.

Robinson was forced to sell Adaland later in life and died in considerable financial difficulties. He is buried in Bluemont Cemetery in his birthplace of Grafton, West Virginia.

Party political offices
Preceded by Henry D. Hatfield	Republican nominee for Governor of West Virginia; 1916	Succeeded by Ephraim F. Morgan
