= 1916 West Virginia gubernatorial election =

- November 7, 1916
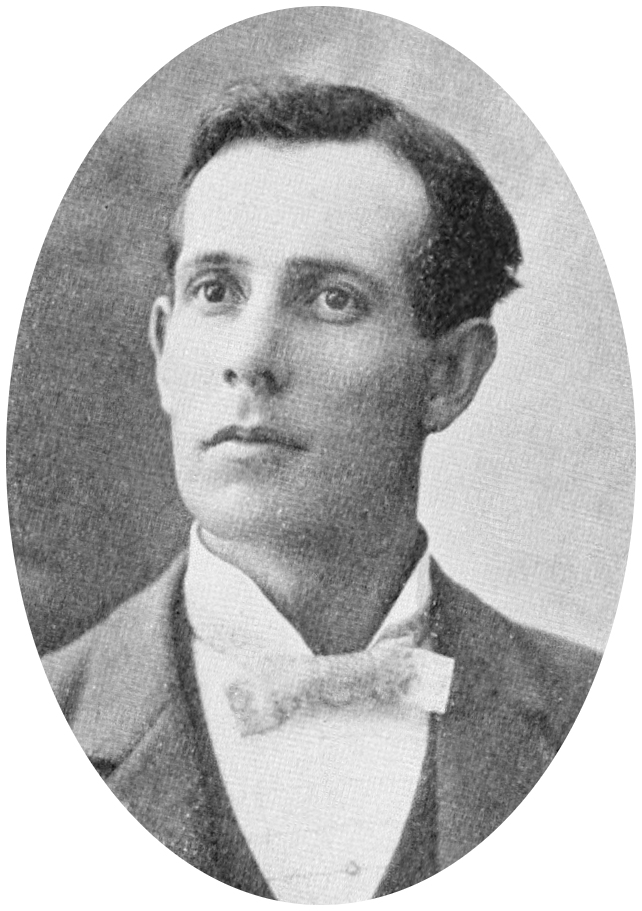

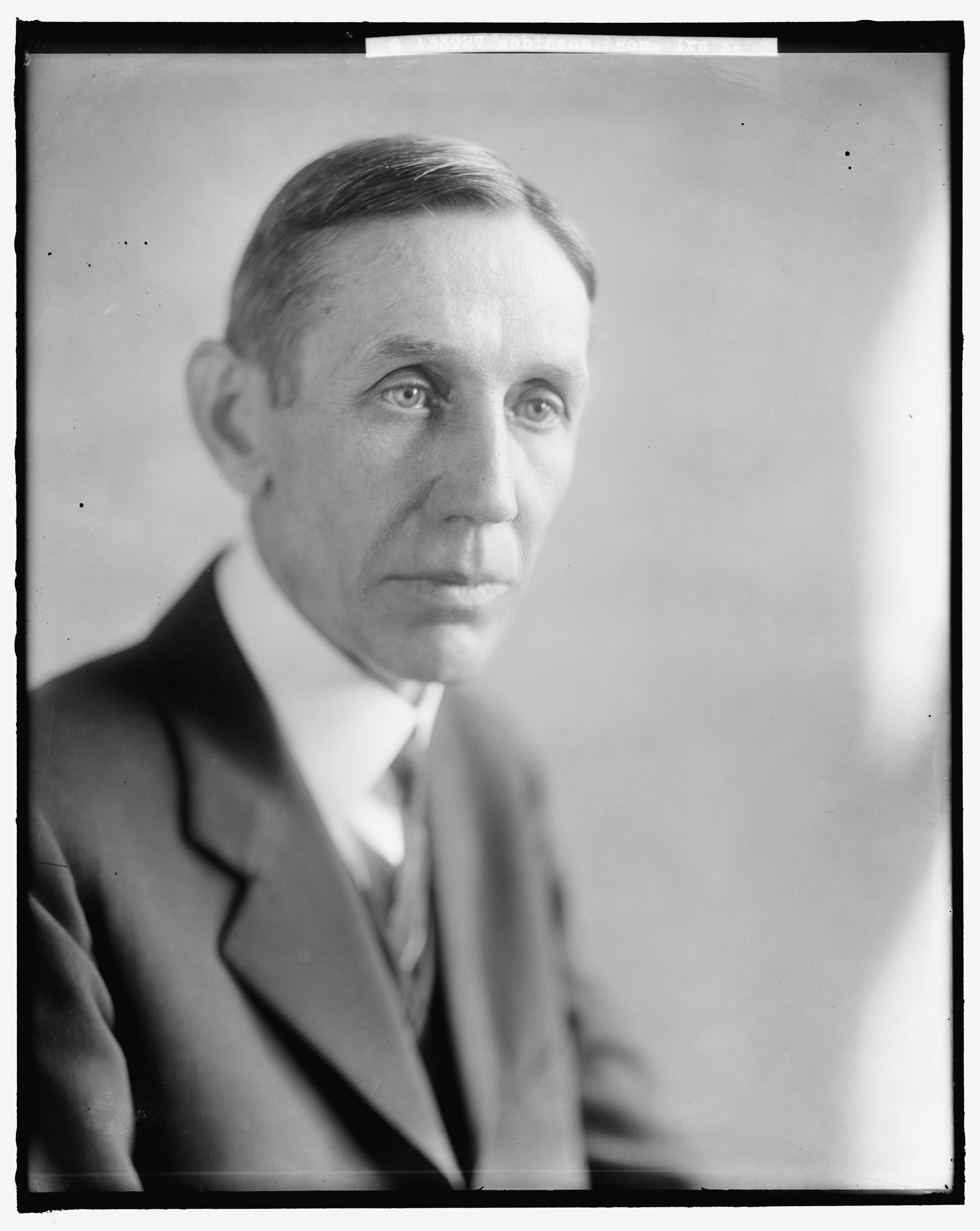
Nominee	John J. Cornwell	Ira E. Robinson
Party	Democratic	Republican
Popular vote	143,324	140,558
Percentage	49.55%	48.59%
- County results Cornwell: 50–60% 60–70% 70–80% Robinson: 50–60% 60–70% 70–80%
Governor before election
Henry D. Hatfield
Republican
Elected Governor
John J. Cornwell
Democratic

The 1916 West Virginia gubernatorial election took place on November 7, 1916, to elect the governor of West Virginia.

== Results ==
1916 West Virginia gubernatorial election
Party	Candidate	Votes	%
Democratic	John J. Cornwell	143,324	49.55
Republican	Ira E. Robinson	140,558	48.59
Socialist	Matthew Samuel Holt	5,399	1.87
Total votes		289,281	100
Democratic gain from Republican			
