= Governor Hatfield =

Governor Hatfield may refer to:

- Henry D. Hatfield (1875–1962), 14th Governor of West Virginia
- Mark Hatfield (1922–2011), 29th Governor of Oregon
