= Ephraim F. Morgan =

American politician (1869–1950)

Ephraim Morgan
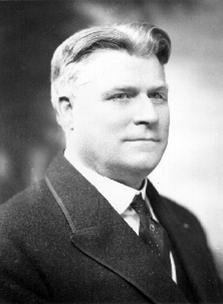
- Morgan in 1922

16th Governor of West Virginia
- In office March 4, 1921 – March 4, 1925
- Preceded by: John J. Cornwell
- Succeeded by: Howard Mason Gore

Personal details
- Born: January 16, 1869 Marion County, West Virginia, U.S.
- Died: January 15, 1950 (aged 80) Bethesda, Maryland, U.S.
- Party: Republican
- Spouse: Alma Bennett Morgan
- Profession: Politician

Military service
- Allegiance: United States
- Branch/service: United States Army
- Battles/wars: Spanish-American War

Ephraim Franklin Morgan (January 16, 1869 – January 15, 1950) was an American Republican politician who served as the 16th governor of West Virginia from 1921 to 1925.

== Early life and education ==
He was born on a farm near Forksburg, Marion County, West Virginia, a descendant of the first white settler of western Virginia, Morgan Morgan, and his son David Morgan. He studied at Fairmont State Normal School and graduated from the West Virginia University law school in 1897. After establishing a law practice in Fairmont, Morgan enlisted in the First West Virginia Infantry during the Spanish–American War. In 1902, he married Alma Bennett.

== Political career ==
Following the war, he became the Fairmont city attorney. He served as a judge of the Marion County Intermediate Court from 1907 to 1912 and as a member of the West Virginia Public Service Commission from 1915 to 1920.

At the time Morgan became governor, a virtual state of war existed between union coal miners and coal operators. The United Mine Workers union was protesting for the right to organize miners in the southwestern part of the state. In late summer 1921, the governor called upon President Warren G. Harding to dispatch federal troops to end an armed miners' march in Boone and Logan counties. After the conflict ended, Morgan used National Guard troops to discourage miners from again taking up arms. A more detailed discussion of the 1921 armed miners' march and the Battle of Blair Mountain can be found in Clayton D. Laurie's "The United States Army and the Return to Normalcy in Labor Dispute Interventions: The Case of the West Virginia Coal Mine Wars, 1920–1921" in West Virginia History, Volume 50 (1991).

Under Morgan, the legislature created a sinking fund to provide financial assistance to new programs, namely a new road system. He appointed a Capitol Commission to devise a plan for replacing the old state capitol, which was destroyed by fire on January 3, 1921. The west wing of the present state capitol was completed in 1925. One week before leaving office, Ephraim and Alma Morgan became the first residents of the present West Virginia Governor's Mansion.

After his term as governor, Morgan served as solicitor for the United States Department of Commerce before retiring in Fairmont, West Virginia. In 1940, he was defeated for the Republican nomination for the United States Senate. He died in Bethesda, Maryland, on January 15, 1950, one day before his 81st birthday.

Party political offices
| Preceded by Ira E. Robinson | Republican nominee for Governor of West Virginia; 1920 | Succeeded by Howard Mason Gore |
Political offices
| Preceded by John J. Cornwell | Governor of West Virginia; 1921–1925 | Succeeded by Howard M. Gore |
