= 1908 West Virginia gubernatorial election =

- November 3, 1908
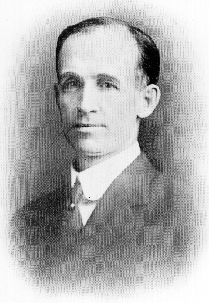

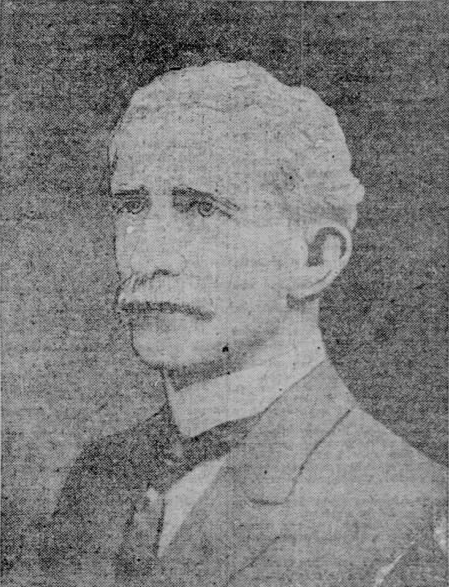
Nominee	William E. Glasscock	Louis Bennett Sr.
Party	Republican	Democratic
Popular vote	130,807	118,909
Percentage	50.70%	46.09%
- County results Glasscock: 50–60% 60–70% 70–80% Bennett: 50–60% 60–70% 70–80%
Governor before election
William M. O. Dawson
Republican
Elected Governor
William E. Glasscock
Republican

The 1908 West Virginia gubernatorial election took place on November 3, concurrently with the presidential election. Republican nominee William E. Glasscock was elected Governor of West Virginia, defeating Democratic nominee Louis Bennett Sr.

== Democratic nomination ==
=== Candidates ===
- Louis Bennett Sr. of Lewis County, former Speaker of the West Virginia House of Delegates.
- Adam Brown Littlepage of Kanawha County, state senator and counsel for the United Mine Workers.

=== Convention ===
Louis Bennett Sr. was nominated on the first ballot on July 30. His competitor, Adam B. Littlepage, was nominated for the position of Secretary of State.

By a wide margin, (Note: Contemporary newspapers cite the numbers as 710 for, 412 against, while Tucker 2008 lists the numbers as 712 for, 411 against.) the convention adopted two planks calling for the continuation of disenfranchisement of black voters and segregation of train cars. The adoption of the planks was opposed by former Governor William A. MacCorkle, who warned that they would cause the party's defeat in the general election.

== Republican nomination ==
=== Candidates ===
- William Hearne of Ohio County, attorney
- Arnold C. Scherr of Grant County, State Auditor
- Charles W. Swisher of Marion County, Secretary of State

=== Campaign and conventions ===
The Republican Party of West Virginia's nomination process in this period was a patchwork of indirect primaries and conventions, all taking place over several months.

Early in the race, Hearne touted that he would go to the convention with the full support of the Northern Panhandle. He was awarded the full slate of delegates from his home state of Ohio County, owing to no other candidates contesting the race. However, after losing the Marshall County primary to Scherr, Hearne dropped out. After the Ohio County Republican Party's executive committee selected a slate of delegates supportive of Scherr, Hearne re-entered the race, demanding to select his own delegates. On July 7, the state party's executive committee ruled in favor of Hearne, leading Scherr's supporters to bolt the convention.

Scherr's supporters, going by the title "Lincoln Republicans", adopted a platform demanding primary elections and nominated a separate set of candidates for statewide office. Within a week, four of the statewide nominees had left the Lincoln Republican ticket - Thomas C. Miller and John T. Harris repudiating the convention that they had attended, James K. Hall and John T. Harris having been nominated by friends without their knowledge.

=== Compromise ===
Scherr, Swisher, and presidential nominee William Howard Taft, among other party leaders, held a conference in Hot Springs, Virginia for several days in August. Taft refused to side with either faction.

On September 23, the regular Republicans and Lincoln Republicans agreed to both support William E. Glasscock, as a compromise. Additionally, changes to the nomination process was made, with delegates apportioned based on the county rather than the district, and requiring either a primary or a district convention to be held.

== General election ==
=== Results ===
West Virginia gubernatorial election, 1908
Party	Candidate	Votes	%
Republican	William E. Glasscock	130,807	50.70
Democratic	Louis Bennett Sr.	118,909	46.09
Independent	E. W. Miller	4,967	1.93
Socialist	I. W. Houston	3,308	1.28
Total votes		257,991	100
Republican hold			

Official results, as published in The Charleston Mail on December 2. (Note: Totals for Mills and Houston were not printed. By-county percentages are based only on major party votes.)
County	William E. Glasscock Republican		Louis Bennett Sr. Democratic		Edward Mills Prohibition		Harold W. Houston Socialist	
County	#	%	#	%	#	%	#	%
Barbour	2,012	54.4%	1,685	45.6%				
Berkeley	2,641	50.3%	2,606	49.7%				
Boone	995	49.1%	1,032	50.9%				
Braxton	2,365	47.9%	2,573	52.1%				
Brooke	1,310	53.3%	1,147	46.7%				
Cabell	4,738	50.4%	4,665	49.6%				
Calhoun	975	44.0%	1,243	56.0%				
Clay	1,317	61.3%	832	38.7%				
Doddridge	1,720	62.2%	1,045	37.8%				
Fayette	5,594	57.8%	4,082	42.2%				
Gilmer	918	36.6%	1,587	63.5%				
Grant	1,220	74.3%	421	25.7%				
Greenbrier	2,366	46.3%	2,742	53.7%				
Hampshire	561	22.7%	1,910	77.3%				
Hancock	1,179	61.7%	733	38.3%				
Hardy	593	31.6%	1,284	68.4%				
Harrison	4,542	50.8%	4,404	49.2%				
Jackson	2,579	56.4%	1,994	43.6%				
Jefferson	1,235	32.9%	2,519	67.1%				
Kanawha	9,018	54.3%	7,585	45.7%				
Lewis	2,028	49.4%	2,081	50.6%				
Lincoln	2,183	55.2%	1,750	44.8%				
Logan	723	33.9%	1,409	66.1%				
Marion	4,095	49.1%	4,251	50.9				
Marshall	3,415	54.5%	2,855	45.5%				
Mason	3,063	60.4%	2,009	39.6%				
McDowell	5,598	69.2%	2,491	30.8%				
Mercer	3,787	52.2%	3,468	47.8%				
Mineral	1,893	53.9%	1,619	46.1%				
Mingo	2,028	56.6%	1,554	43.4%				
Monongalia	2,908	59.6%	1,972	40.4%				
Monroe	1,480	49.5%	1,507	50.5%				
Morgan	1,116	66.3%	567	33.7%				
Nicholas	1,763	49.7%	1,781	50.3				
Ohio	6,381	45.8%	7,550	54.2%				
Pendleton	884	42.3%	1,204	57.7%				
Pleasants	970	50.9%	936	49.1%				
Pocahontas	1,615	54.2%	1,366	45.8%				
Preston	3,748	69.5%	1,643	30.5%				
Putnam	2,073	54.1%	1,760	45.9%				
Raleigh	2,414	54.3%	2,033	45.7%				
Randolph	2,220	44.0%	2,829	56.0%				
Ritchie	2,181	60.4%	1,430	39.6%				
Roane	2,309	54.8%	1,907	45.2%				
Summers	1,856	45.7%	2,207	54.3%				
Taylor	1,901	51.9%	1,772	48.1%				
Tucker	1,783	56.4%	1,380	43.6%				
Tyler	2,032	58.5%	1,441	41.5%				
Upshur	2,502	72.8%	933	27.2%				
Wayne	2,392	47.8%	2,610	52.2%				
Webster	914	42.9%	1,216	57.1%				
Wetzel	2,179	42.5%	2,953	57.5%				
Wirt	1,013	48.9%	1,060	51.1%				
Wood	4,238	48.8%	4,439	51.2%				
Wyoming	1,244	59.8%	837	40.1%				
Totals	130,807	50.7%	118,909	46.1%	4,967	1.9%	3,308	1.3%
