= South Carolina "Carrie" Bronson Hatfield =

- Born: September 9, 1876; Warfield, Kentucky, U.S.
- Died: May 8, 1962 (aged 85); Huntington, West Virginia, U.S.
- Known for: First lady of West Virginia, 1913-1917

South Carolina "Carrie" Bronson Hatfield (September 9, 1876 – May 8, 1962) was the wife of former Governor of West Virginia Henry D. Hatfield and served as that state's first lady from 1913 to 1917. She was born September 9, 1876, at Warfield, Kentucky. In 1895, she married Henry D. Hatfield. As first lady, she hosted social gatherings and participated in Charleston civic affairs. After leaving office, the Hatfields resided in Washington, D.C., where Governor Hatfield served a term in the United States Senate, then moved to Huntington, West Virginia, where she died on May 8, 1962.

Honorary titles
| Preceded by Mary Miller Glasscock | First Lady of West Virginia; 1913–1917 | Succeeded by Edna Brady Cornwell |
