= Alma Bennett Morgan =

- Born: June 24, 1877; Monongalia County, West Virginia, U.S.
- Died: April 5, 1960 (aged 82); Morgantown, West Virginia, U.S.
- Known for: First lady of West Virginia, 1921-1925

Alma Bennett Morgan (24 June 1877 – 4 April 1960) was the wife of former Governor of West Virginia Ephraim F. Morgan and served as West Virginia's First Lady from 1921 to 1925.

== Life ==
Alma was born in 1877 to Albert and Isabelle Bennett in Monongalia County, West Virginia. She taught school in Marion County, West Virginia. This is where she met Ephraim F. Morgan, and the two married in September 1903. As first lady, she ardently opposed the consumption of alcohol and actively campaigned for a woman's right to vote. She provided design ideas to architect Walter F. Martens in the design of the West Virginia Governor's Mansion. They moved into the newly constructed mansion six days before leaving office. After leaving office, the Morgans lived in Washington, D.C. and in Fairmont, West Virginia. The couple had two children. One child died at the age of fifteen months. After Ephraim died in 1950, Alma moved to Morgantown, West Virginia, where she died on April 5, 1960.

Honorary titles
Preceded by Edna Brady Cornwell	First Lady of West Virginia; 1921 – 1925	Succeeded by Bertie Ison Martin Conley
