= Forksburg, West Virginia =

Unincorporated community in West Virginia, United States

Forksburg
- Unincorporated community
- Location within the state of West Virginia Forksburg (the United States)
- Coordinates: 39°28′43″N 80°2′49″W
- Country: United States
- State: West Virginia
- County: Marion
- Elevation: 1,381 ft (421 m)
- Time zone: UTC-5 (Eastern (EST))
  - Summer (DST): UTC-4 (EDT)
- GNIS ID: 1718149

Forksburg is an unincorporated community in Marion County, West Virginia, United States. Its post office is closed.

== Notable person ==
- Ephraim F. Morgan - former Governor of West Virginia.
