= William E. Glasscock =

American politician (1862–1925)

13th Governor of West Virginia
- In office March 4, 1909 – March 14, 1913
- Preceded by: William M. O. Dawson
- Succeeded by: Henry D. Hatfield

Personal details
- Born: December 13, 1862 Monongalia County, Virginia (now West Virginia)
- Died: April 12, 1925 (aged 62) Morgantown, West Virginia
- Party: Republican
- Spouse: Mary Miller Glasscock
- Profession: Politician

William Ellsworth "Willy" Glasscock (December 13, 1862 – April 12, 1925) was an American politician who served as the 13th governor of West Virginia as a Republican from 1909 to 1913.

== Biography ==
William Glasscock was born on a farm near Arnettsville, Virginia, now part of Monongalia County, West Virginia on December 13, 1862. He was educated in the local public school system and graduated from West Virginia University in Morgantown, West Virginia. In 1888, he married Mary Miller.

Glasscock worked for several years as a teacher, becoming the superintendent of schools in 1887 before leaving education to become the clerk of the county circuit court in 1890. He was admitted to the bar in 1903 and began practicing law. He worked as an attorney for Senator Stephen B. Elkins. At Elkins' recommendation, Glasscock was appointed as the internal revenue collection for the District of West Virginia in 1905 by President Theodore Roosevelt.

In 1908, Glasscock resigned from this position to run for governor. He ran as the Republican nominee for Governor of West Virginia in 1908, beating Louis Bennett Sr. by 12,133 votes. In his last year as governor, he declared martial law three times, sending troops to quell violent Coal Wars. Glasscock then returned to practicing law.

Glasscock was ill for the last several years of his life, and he spent time in Florida attempting to recuperate during his final weeks. He died at home at Morgantown, West Virginia early in the morning of April 12, 1925, with wire reports attributing his demise to a "general breakdown of health."

Glasscock was buried in Oak Grove Cemetery, with the minister of the local Methodist Episcopal Church officiating.

Party political offices
Preceded by William M. O. Dawson	Republican nominee for Governor of West Virginia; 1908	Succeeded by Henry D. Hatfield
Political offices
Preceded by William M. O. Dawson	Governor of West Virginia; 1909–1913	Succeeded by Henry D. Hatfield
