= Edna Brady Cornwell =

- Born: May 26, 1868; Romney, West Virginia
- Died: December 1, 1958 (aged 90); Romney, West Virginia
- Known for: First lady of West Virginia, 1917-1921

Edna Brady Cornwell (1868–1958) was the wife of former Governor of West Virginia John J. Cornwell and served as that state's First Lady, 1917-1921. She was born May 26, 1868, at Romney, West Virginia. In 1891 she married John J. Cornwell, publisher of the Hampshire Review. As first lady, she hosted social gatherings and participated in Charleston civic affairs. After leaving office, the Cornwells returned to Romney, West Virginia. After Gov. Cornwell died in 1953, Edna Cornwell continued as publisher of the Hampshire Review until her death on December 1, 1958.

Honorary titles
Preceded by South Carolina "Carrie" Bronson Hatfield	First Lady of West Virginia; 1917 – 1921	Succeeded by Alma Bennett Morgan
