= Henry D. Hatfield =

American politician (1875–1962)

- Hatfield, c. 1913, photographed by George Grantham Bain

United States Senator from West Virginia
- In office March 4, 1929 – January 3, 1935
- Preceded by: Matthew M. Neely
- Succeeded by: Rush Holt Sr.

14th Governor of West Virginia
- In office March 14, 1913 – March 5, 1917
- Preceded by: William E. Glasscock
- Succeeded by: John J. Cornwell

President of the West Virginia Senate
- In office January 30, 1911 – January 24, 1913
- Governor: William E. Glasscock
- Preceded by: Robert F. Kidd
- Succeeded by: Samuel V. Woods

Member of the West Virginia Senate from the 6th district
- In office December 1, 1908 – December 1, 1912
- Preceded by: W. W. Whyte
- Succeeded by: James A. Strother

Personal details
- Born: Henry Drury Hatfield; September 15, 1875 Mingo County, West Virginia, US
- Died: October 23, 1962 (aged 87) Huntington, West Virginia, US
- Party: Republican
- Spouse: South Carolina "Carrie" Bronson Hatfield (m. 1895; died 1962)
- Relations: Devil Anse Hatfield (uncle); Benjamin Franklin Fairless (son-in-law)
- Education: University of Louisville (DMD)
- Profession: Politician, physician

Henry Drury Hatfield (September 15, 1875 – October 23, 1962) was an American politician. He served a term as the 14th governor of West Virginia, in addition to one term in the United States Senate.

== Biography ==
Hatfield was born on September 15, 1875, in Sidney, West Virginia, the second son of Elias Hatfield and Elizabeth Chafin Hatfield. He was a nephew of Devil Anse Hatfield, a belligerent of the Hatfield–McCoy feud. He attended Franklin College, then studied medicine at the University of Louisville and New York University, graduating in 1895 and 1904, respectively. He married South Carolina "Carrie" Bronson in 1895.

Hatfield began his career as a physician of the Pocahontas Fuel Company. He then served as health commissioner of Mingo County, West Virginia from 1895 to 1900. He was a surgeon for the Norfolk and Western Railway between 1895 and 1913, and between 1899 and 1913, served as chief surgeon of a hospital. His first non-medical position was serving as road commissioner of McDowell County, West Virginia, which he did from 1900 to 1905. From 1906 to 1912, he was a member of the McDowell County court.

A Republican, Hatfield served in the West Virginia Senate from 1908 to 1912, from the 6th district, and was its president from January 30, 1911, to January 24, 1913. From March 14, 1913, to March 5, 1917, he was Governor of West Virginia. He inherited the Paint Creek–Cabin Creek strike of 1912, which he settled by pardoning Mother Jones and other labor leaders. He also signed into law the first Workers' compensation program. Though, he declared mashal law and had weapons seized and strikers arrested whom he did not pardon. He received criticism from conservative newspapers for raising taxes, which they called "unnecessary". After his term as governor ended, he retired from politics, though later returned.

Hatfield was a delegate of the Republican National Convention in 1916, 1932, 1944, 1948, and 1952. He was a noncombatant during World War I, serving in the United States Army Medical Corps from 1917 to 1919, as head of American Base Hospital No. 36; he was mustered from service at the rank of major. He served in the United States Senate, from March 4, 1929, to January 3, 1935. During his tenure, he was a member of the Senate Committee on Immigration.

After losing his 1934 re-election, Hatfield settled in Huntington, West Virginia, where he owned farmland and operated a hospital. Religiously, he was a Methodist. He died on October 23, 1962, aged 87, in Huntington. He is buried in Woodmere Cemetery. His daughter was the wife of business executive Benjamin Franklin Fairless.

Party political offices
Preceded by William E. Glasscock	Republican nominee for Governor of West Virginia; 1912	Succeeded by Ira E. Robinson
Preceded by Howard Sutherland	Republican nominee for U.S. Senator from West Virginia (Class 1); 1928, 1934	Succeeded by Thomas Sweeney
Political offices
Preceded by L. J. Forman	President of the West Virginia Senate; 1911–1913	Succeeded by Samuel V. Woods
Preceded by William E. Glasscock	Governor of West Virginia; 1913–1917	Succeeded by John J. Cornwell
U.S. Senate
Preceded by Matthew M. Neely	Class 1 U.S. Senator from West Virginia; 1929–1935	Succeeded by Rush D. Holt Sr.
