= Hampshire Review =

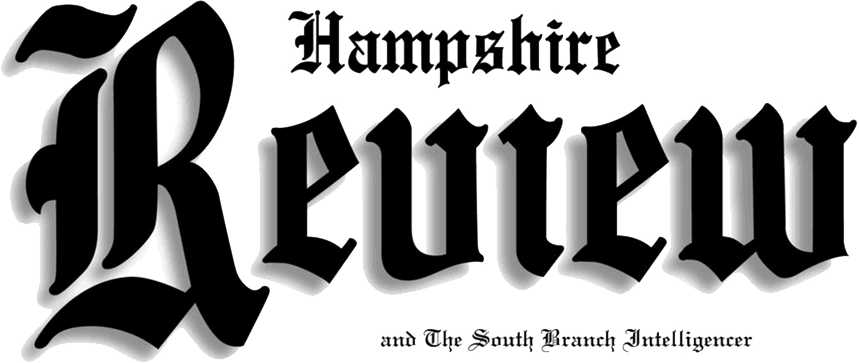
- Type: Weekly newspaper
- Format: Broadsheet
- Owner(s): Cornwell & Ailes Inc.
- Publisher: Craig See
- Editor: Sallie See
- Founded: 1884
- Headquarters: 74 West Main St. Romney, WV 26757
- Circulation: 7,150 (as of 2016)
- ISSN: 0736-5497
- OCLC number: 9805487
- Website: hampshirereview.com

The Hampshire Review is a weekly newspaper serving Hampshire County in the U.S. state of West Virginia. Headquartered in the city of Romney, it is published on Wednesday. Its 2020 circulation was 7,200. It is owned by Cornwell & Ailes Inc.

== The early Hampshire Review ==
Established 1884 by the Review Company, the Hampshire Review was launched as a seven column folio by C.F. Poland. The strongest paper in the county up until that time, it was edited and owned by Poland until he sold it to the Cornwell Brothers in 1890. Poland moved on to the Intelligencer, a long-established paper in the area.

== South Branch Intelligencer and merger ==
Sometime around 1830, William Harper started the Hampshire and Hardy Intelligencer, changed shortly to the South Branch Intelligencer A six-column four page paper, initially printed on a Franklin Press, it was a Whig party vehicle up until the American Civil War, but became a Democratic paper after it.

After Harper's death in 1887, his wife took over the paper, selling it to a stock company in 1890. The stock company put C.F. Poland, who had recently sold the Hampshire Review, at the helm. In 1897 the stock and fixtures were sold to the Cornwells and merged with the Review, with John Jacob.

John Jacob Cornwell continued as editor until winning election for governor in 1916. The Cornwell family has had a stake in the paper since the 1890s.

== Resources ==
- List of newspapers in West Virginia
