= John J. Cornwell =

American politician (1867–1953)

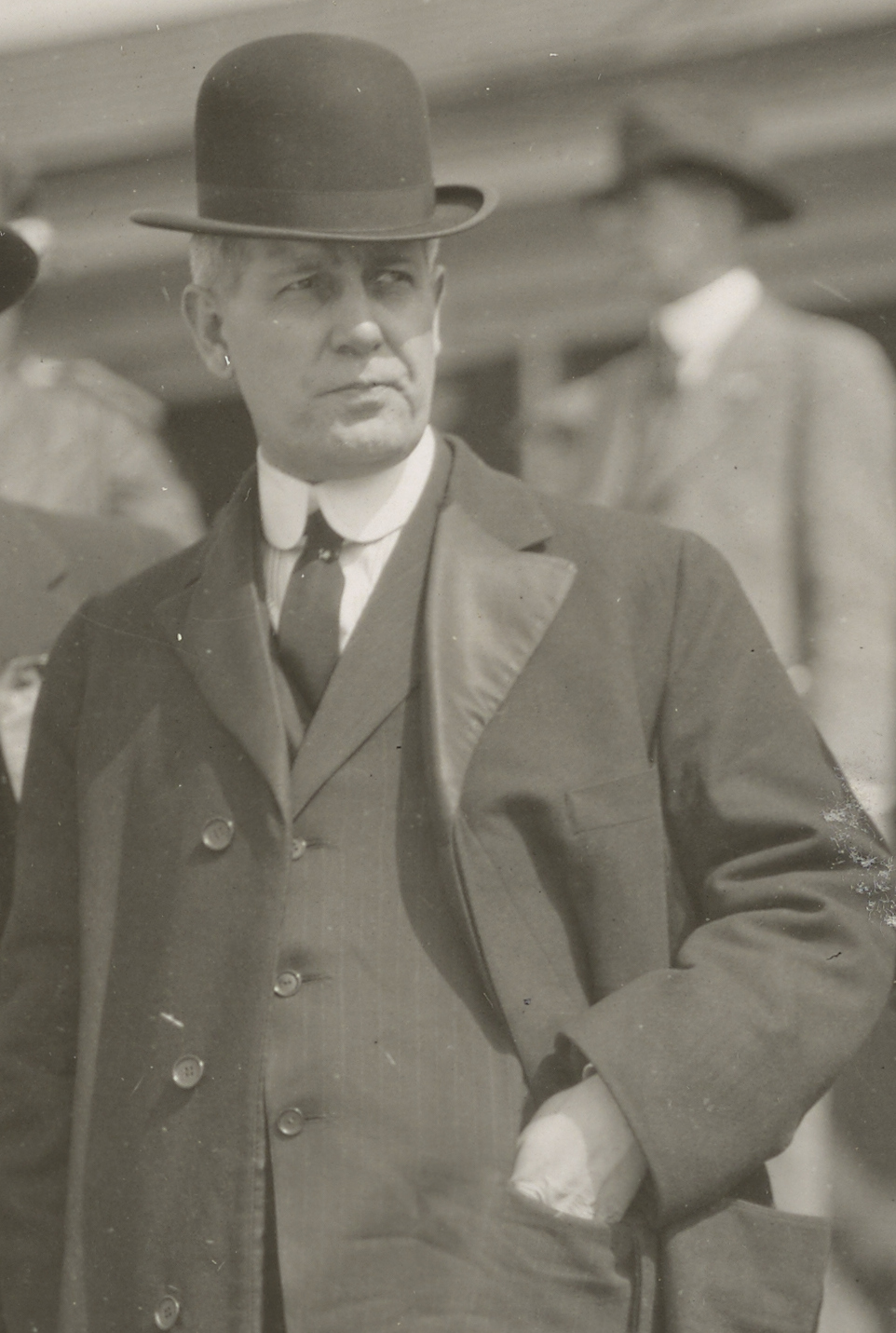
- Cornwell in 1918

15th Governor of West Virginia
- In office March 5, 1917 – March 4, 1921
- Preceded by: Henry D. Hatfield
- Succeeded by: Ephraim F. Morgan

Member of the West Virginia Senate
- In office 1899–1905

Personal details
- Born: July 11, 1867 Ritchie County, West Virginia, U.S.
- Died: September 8, 1953 (aged 86) Cumberland, Maryland, U.S.
- Party: Democratic
- Spouse: Edna Brady Cornwell
- Profession: Politician

John Jacob Cornwell (July 11, 1867 – September 8, 1953) was a conservative Democratic politician from Romney in Hampshire County, in the U.S. state of West Virginia. Cornwell served as the 15th governor of West Virginia, from 1917 to 1921. He also served in the West Virginia Senate from 1899 to 1905.

== Background ==
John Jacob Cornwell was born on a farm near the community of Pennsboro in Ritchie County, into a family whose ancestor Peter Cornwell, born in Wales in 1634, settled in the Virginia Colony. In 1870, when John J. Cornwell was three years old, his family moved to Hampshire County in West Virginia's Eastern Panhandle. Cornwell attended Shepherd University in Shepherdstown at the age of sixteen and upon graduating became a schoolteacher in Hampshire County.

In 1890, Cornwell and his brother, William B. Cornwell, acquired the Romney Hampshire Review and assumed the roles of publishers and editors of the newspaper. In 1892, he married Edna Brady. In 1897, Cornwell and his brother bought out the competing paper, the South Branch Intelligencer, adding its name and 1829 founding date to the Review's masthead.

== Political Office ==
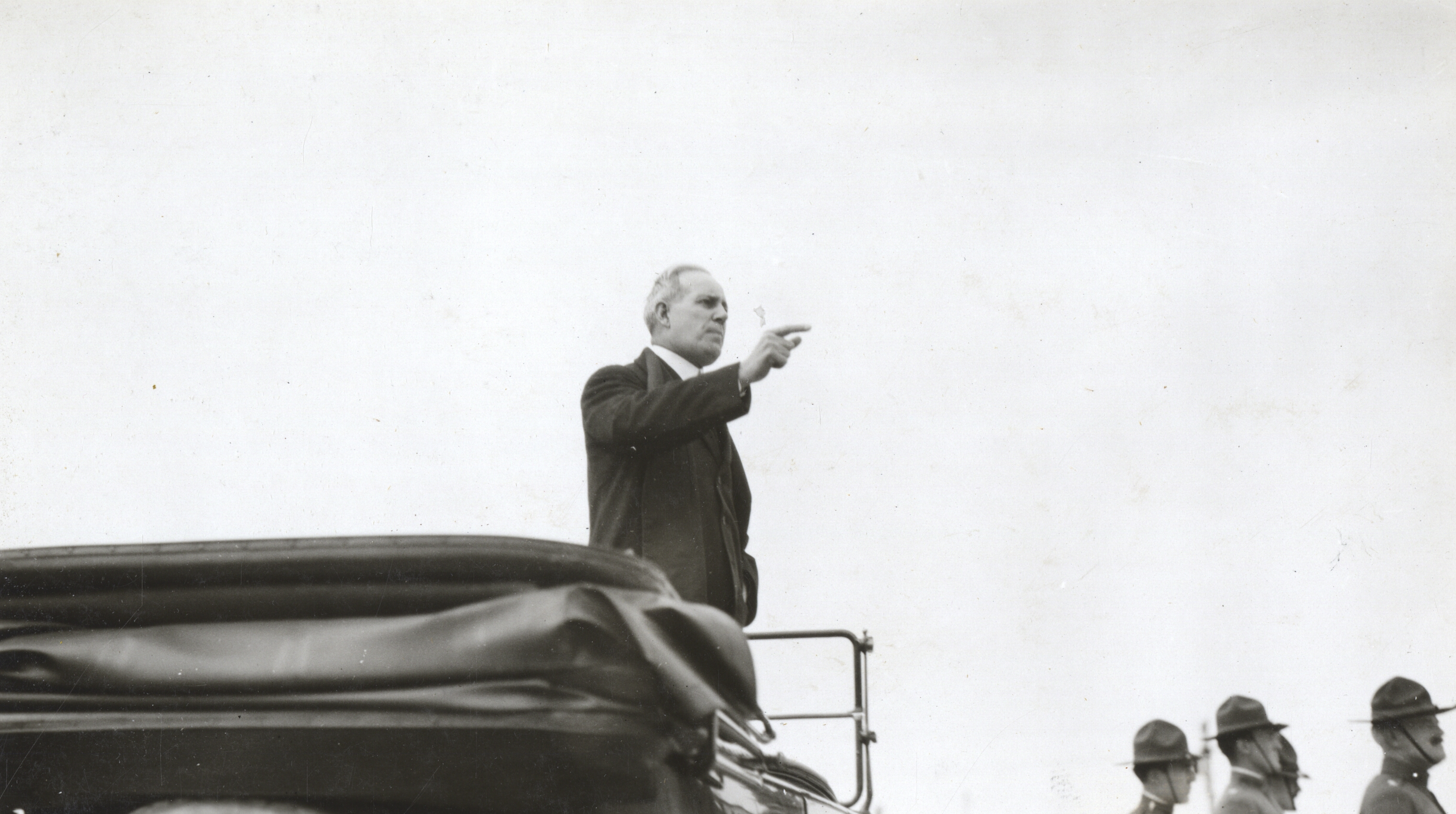
Cornwell speaking in 1918

Cornwell was admitted to the bar in 1898 and served as a state senator from 1899 to 1905. He was defeated in his first gubernatorial bid by William Mercer Owens Dawson in 1904, but was elected governor in 1916, took office in March 1917, and served until 1921. Cornwell was the only Democrat elected to a statewide office in 1916, and he was the only Democrat to serve as governor in a thirty-six-year span between 1897 and 1933.

One month after Cornwell took office as governor, the United States entered World War I and due in part to his efforts, West Virginia had one of the highest percentages of volunteers of any state. Also during his term, the state reached an agreement on a public debt figure owed to Virginia since West Virginia's statehood in 1863. Cornwell advocated strengthening the mining code, the creation of a state board of education, and the establishment of the West Virginia Department of Public Safety, now officially known as the West Virginia State Police. He supported women's suffrage, adding it to the agenda for a special session of the legislature in February 1920. West Virginia became the 34th state to ratify the Nineteenth Amendment, which granted women nationwide the right to vote. During his time as governor, several reforms were implemented.

Cornwell's term was marked by growing labor unrest in the coal industry of southern West Virginia. He discouraged an armed miners' march in 1919 by assuring them he would address their grievances. His failure to handle the situation led to increased violence, including the infamous shootout between miners and coal company guards in Matewan, Mingo County.

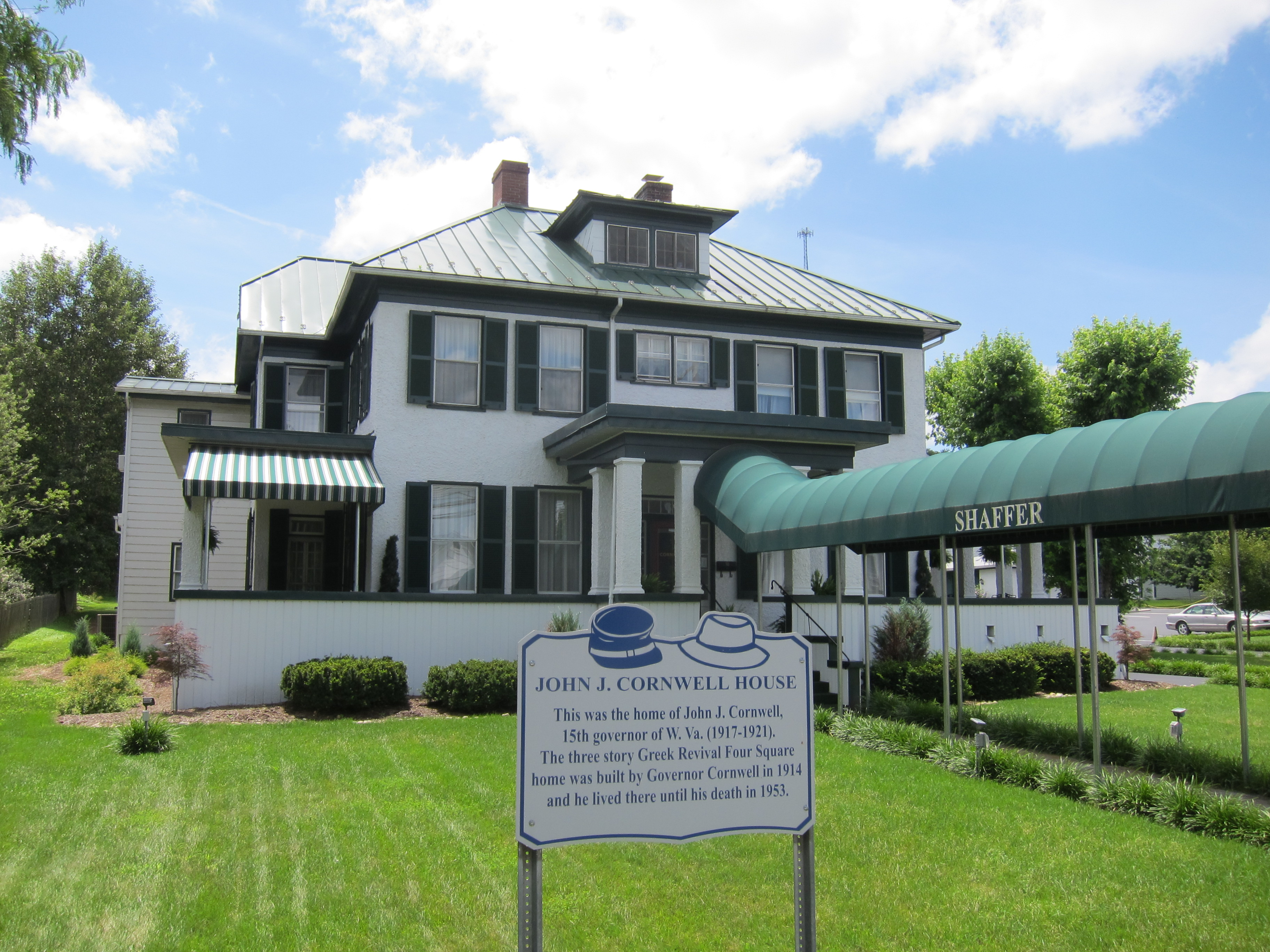
The John J. Cornwell House on East Main Street in Romney.

After leaving office in 1921, Cornwell served as a director and general counsel for the Baltimore and Ohio Railroad.

== Death ==
Upon retirement, Cornwell lived at his home on Main Street in Romney. He contracted pneumonia and died at Cumberland Memorial Hospital in Cumberland, Maryland on September 8, 1953. Cornwell is interred with his wife and son in Romney's Indian Mound Cemetery. His descendants continue to run the Hampshire Review today.

John J. Cornwell Elementary School in Levels, West Virginia was named for him, in honor of his teaching background and strong support of education in the state.

Party political offices
Preceded by John H. Holt	Democratic nominee for Governor of West Virginia; 1904	Succeeded by Louis Bennett Sr.
Preceded by William R. Thompson	Democratic nominee for Governor of West Virginia; 1916	Succeeded by Arthur B. Koontz
Political offices
Preceded by Henry D. Hatfield	Governor of West Virginia; 1917–1921	Succeeded by Ephraim F. Morgan
