= Confederate Memorial (Romney, West Virginia) =

West Virginia monument for Confederate soldiers killed in the American Civil War

- Confederate Memorial Association; Hampshire County, West Virginia
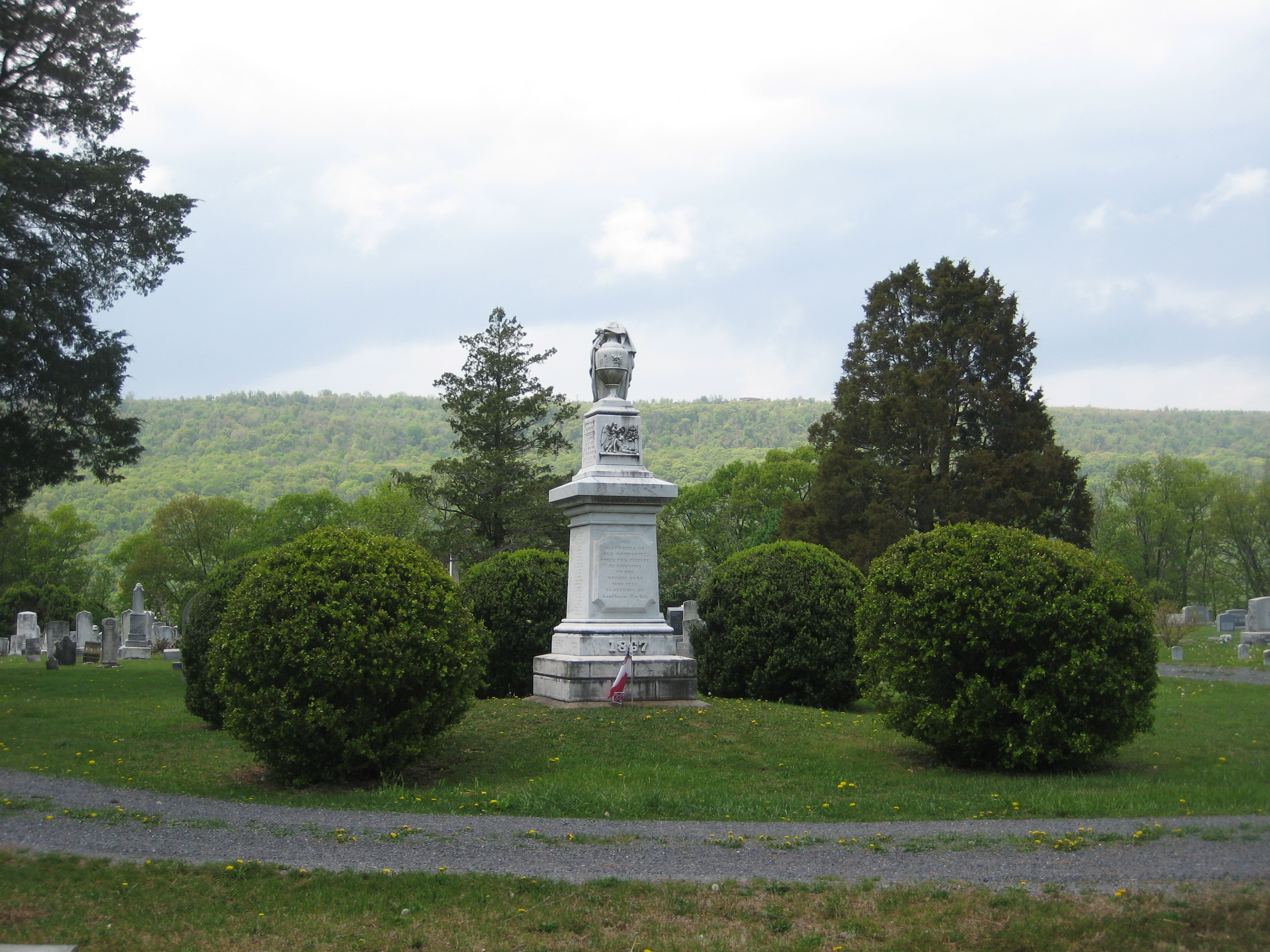
- The Confederate Memorial in 2010
- For the men of Hampshire County who died fighting for the Confederate States of America in the American Civil War.
- Unveiled: September 26, 2001
- Location: 39°20′33″N 78°45′56″W; Indian Mound Cemetery; Romney, West Virginia, United States
- Designed by: Gaddes Brothers of Baltimore, Maryland
- "The Daughters of Old Hampshire Erect This Tribute of Affection to Her Heroic Sons Who Fell in Defence of Southern Rights."
- Location of the Confederate Memorial in Romney Confederate Memorial (West Virginia)

The Confederate Memorial (also referred to as the First Confederate Memorial) at Indian Mound Cemetery in Romney, West Virginia, commemorates residents of Hampshire County who died during the American Civil War while fighting for the Confederate States of America. It was sponsored by the Confederate Memorial Association, which formally dedicated the monument on September 26, 2001. The town of Romney has claimed that this is the first memorial structure erected to memorialize the Confederate dead in the United States and that the town performed the nation's first public decoration of Confederate graves on June 1, 1866.

The idea to memorialize the Confederate war dead of Hampshire County was first discussed in the spring of 1866. Following the decoration of the graves that summer, the Confederate Memorial Association engaged in fundraising for construction of the memorial, and by 1867 the necessary funds were raised. The inscription The Daughters of Old Hampshire Erect This Tribute of Affection to Her Heroic Sons Who Fell in Defence of Southern Rights was selected, and the contract for the memorial's construction was awarded to the Gaddes Brothers firm of Baltimore. The memorial's components were delivered to Indian Mound Cemetery on September 14, 1867, and the memorial was dedicated on September 26 of that year. The construction of the Confederate Memorial marked the beginning of an era of post-war revitalization for Hampshire County following the American Civil War.

The memorial comprises a base with four sides and a capstone, standing on a raised mound. The list of 125 names engraved on the monument includes four captains, seven lieutenants (one of which was a chaplain), three sergeants, and 119 privates. The memorial underwent a restoration in 1984, and is decorated annually with a handmade evergreen garland and wreath on Hampshire County Confederate Memorial Day.

== Confederate Memorial Association ==
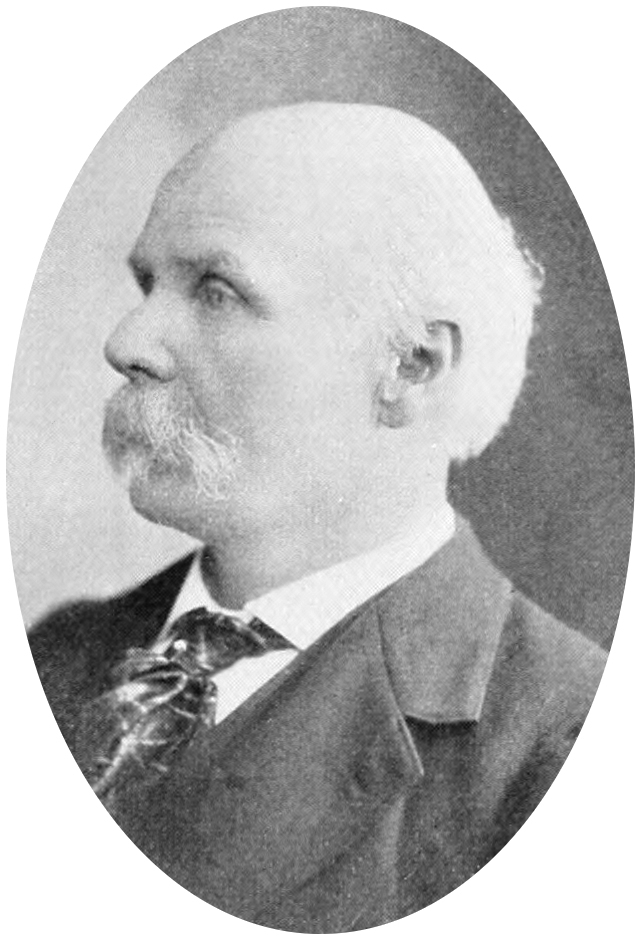
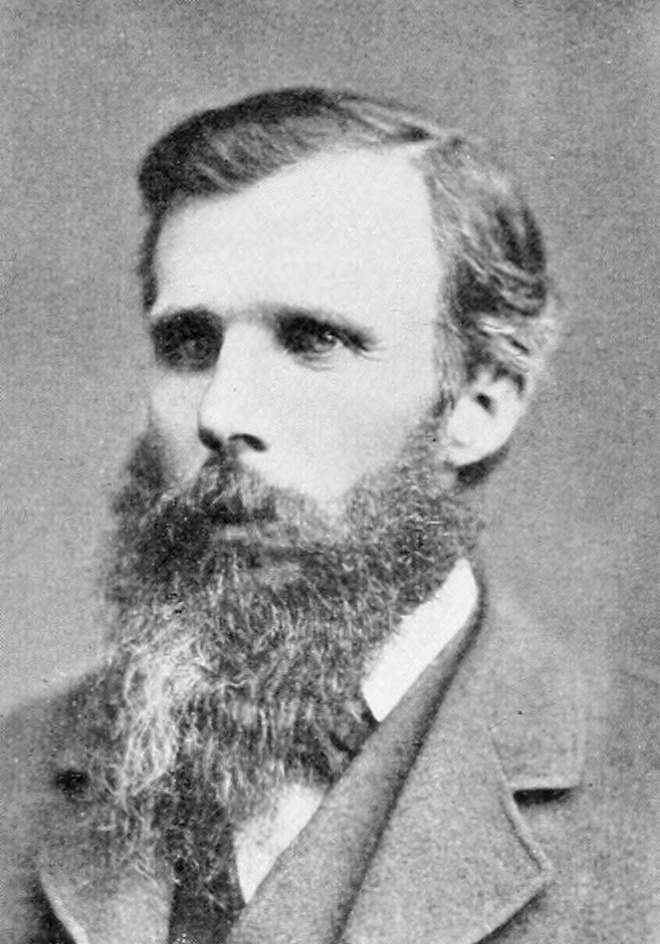
Robert White (pictured left) and his brother Christian Streit White (pictured right) were among the first residents of Romney to conceive of the idea for a Confederate memorial.

The idea to memorialize the men of Hampshire County who had died fighting in the Military of the Confederate States of America during the American Civil War was first discussed at a meeting in early spring of 1866 at the Romney residence of former Confederate Colonel Robert White. In addition to White, those present at the meeting included his brother Christian Streit White, his future sister-in-law Elizabeth "Bessie" Jane Schultze, and his sister Frances Ann White, who later married Samuel Lightfoot Flournoy.

Following the meeting, the concept gained support among other residents of Romney. Later in the spring of 1866, a group of Hampshire County women held a public meeting to organize the Confederate Memorial Association with the mission of honoring the men who had died fighting for the Confederacy and providing financial aid to their families. At this meeting, the association appointed officers, adopted a constitution, and organized committees to arrange for the decoration of Confederate interments. (Note: Maxwell & Swisher 1897, p. 694. In their History of Hampshire County, West Virginia (1897), historians Hu Maxwell and Howard Llewellyn Swisher gathered from the Confederate Memorial Association's minute book the officers of the association: "Presidents: Mrs. Robert White, Mrs. Abraham Smith, Mrs. J. P. Wilson, Mrs. J. L. Vance, Mrs. [Garrett Williams] Parsons [(Mary Avery Covell Parsons)]. Vice-Presidents: Mrs. Margaret V. Taylor, Miss Miranda Taylor, Mrs. C. E. Blue, Mrs. C. S, White, Mrs. J. L. Vance, Mrs. John J. Inskeep. Secretaries: Misses Bessie J. Schultze [later Mrs. C. S, White], Tillie Kern, Mary V. Foote, Ellen Kane, Mary Heiskell, Lou McCarty. Treasurers: Mrs. J. D. Armstrong, Mrs. Michael Blue, Miss Virginia Parsons, Mrs. Julius Waddle.")

The people of Hampshire County had been overwhelmingly pro-Confederate during the American Civil War, but the county now lay within Unionist West Virginia. West Virginia's first state constitution disenfranchised Confederate veterans and partisans and forbade them from holding elected office. In spite of these impediments and risking the ire of Unionist authorities, members of the Confederate Memorial Association and their families marched through Romney to Indian Mound Cemetery and formally decorated the gravestones at the interment sites of Confederate dead on June 1, 1866. Few Hampshire County residents participated in this first decoration of the Confederate graves, fearing reproach from Federal authorities; some who had pledged to take part in the decoration later refused to do so for the same reason.

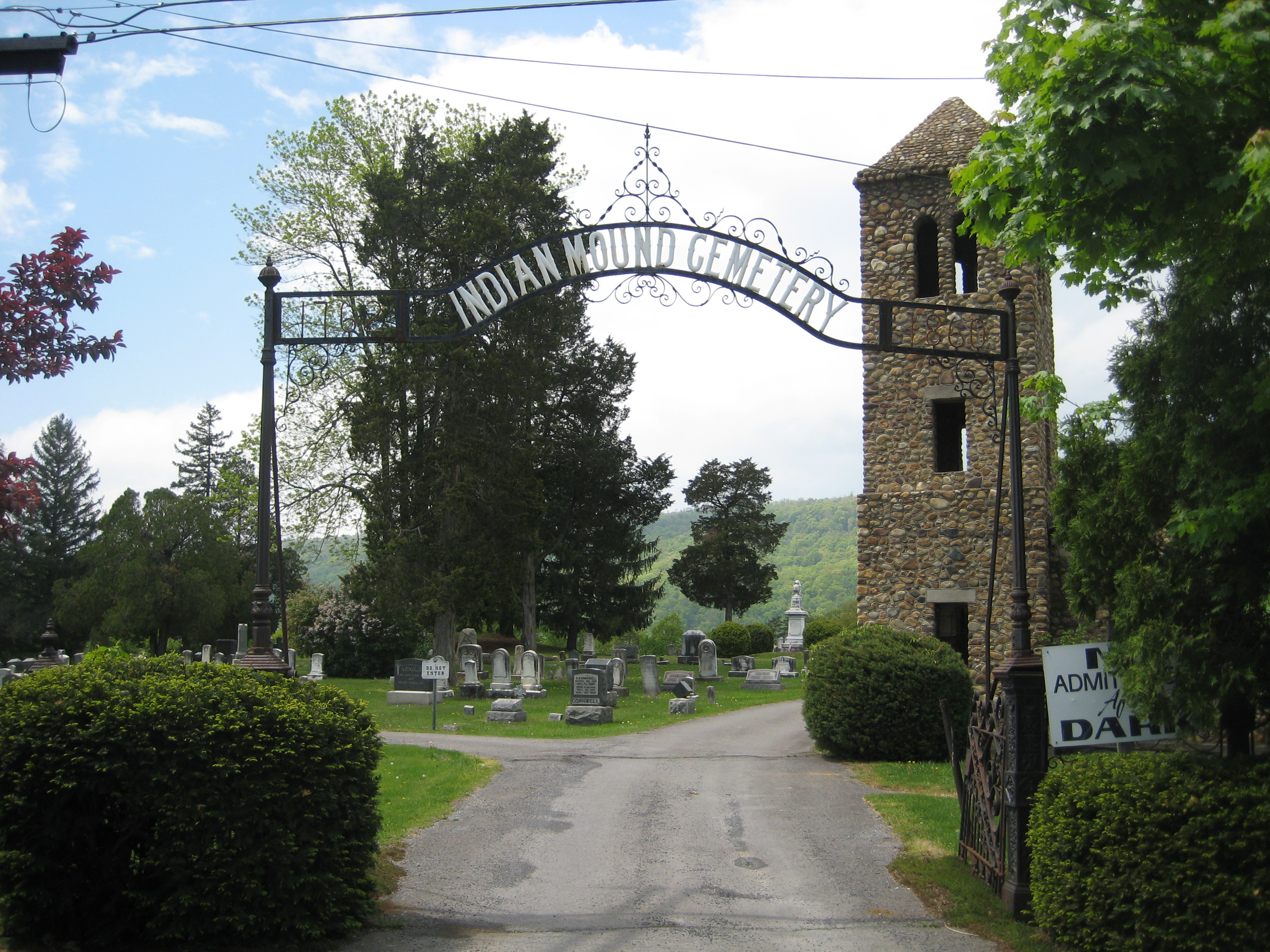
The Confederate Memorial (pictured center right) is located atop a small mound in Indian Mound Cemetery just inside the cemetery's entrance.

This adornment in Indian Mound Cemetery has been called the first such public decoration of Confederate burials, but the claim is disputed by other towns in the Southern United States. Romney's decoration contributed to a precedent that spread throughout the South during the Reconstruction Era. Relatives and loved ones of the Union dead buried in Indian Mound Cemetery also began to follow this precedent by decorating the cemetery's Union headstones.

== Fundraising ==
Following the first decoration of the graves in 1866, momentum built for the erection of a permanent monument to the Confederate dead at Indian Mound Cemetery. The Confederate Memorial Association engaged in fundraising for construction of the memorial, including sewing circles, bazaars, and fairs. Confederate veterans and others in Hampshire County undertook additional fundraising efforts, including entertainment shows and general solicitation. In addition to raising funds for the construction of the memorial, the Confederate Memorial Association also raised money for the widows and children of the Confederate dead. By October 15, 1866, the gross receipts returned to the association's treasury amounted to $1,170.91 USD, of which the Confederate Memorial Association provided US$421.58 to the Confederate widows and orphaned children. Fundraising continued until June 1867.

== Design selection ==
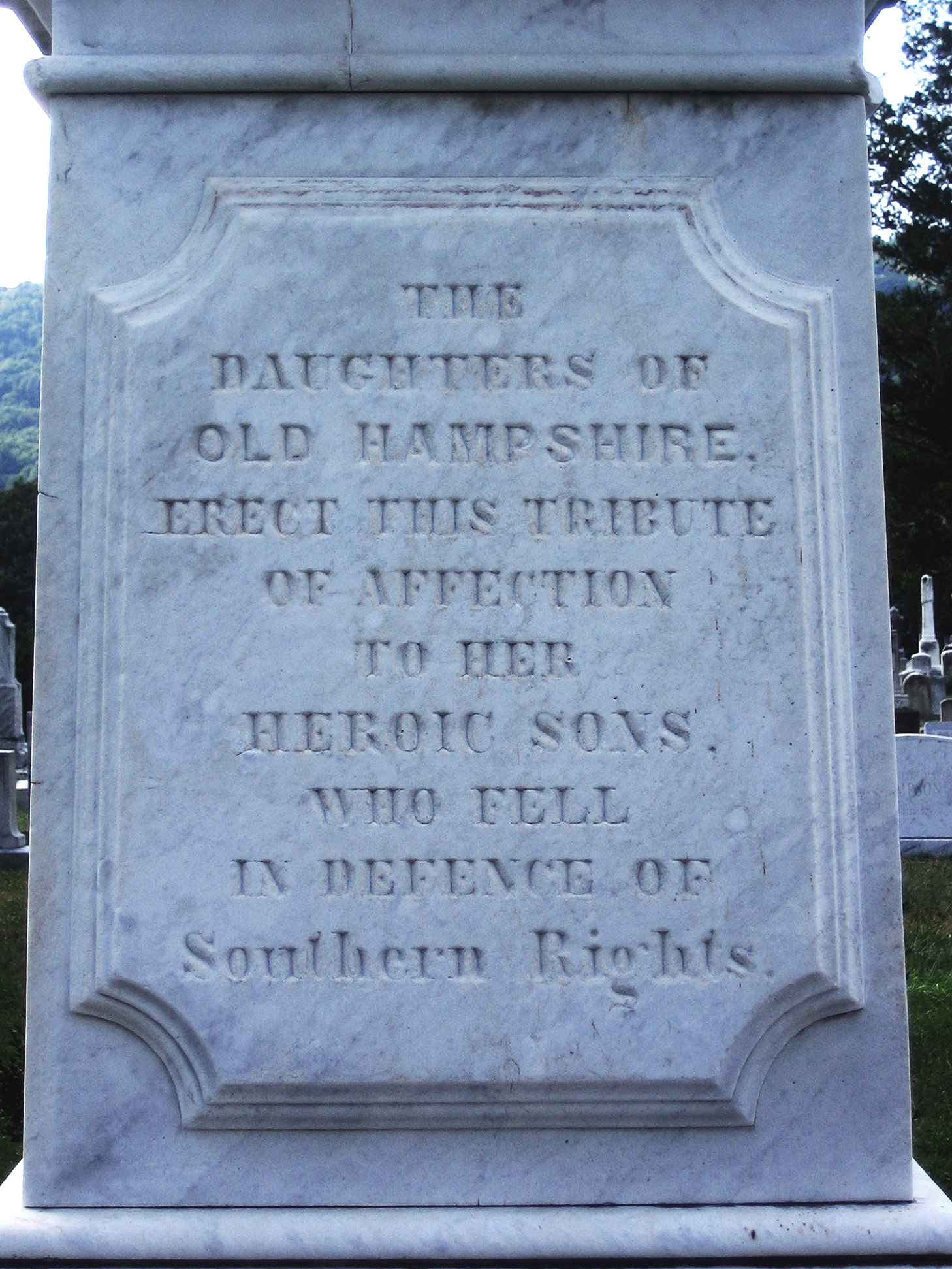
The main inscription (pictured) etched into the façade of the Confederate Memorial

By June 6, 1867, the Confederate Memorial Association had raised the necessary funds and proceeded to select the design, inviting and considering the opinions of Confederate veterans and others across Hampshire County.

In July 1867, a committee of the Confederate Memorial Association narrowed the numerous proposals it had received for the memorial's inscription to three finalists. The first inscription finalist said the Confederate soldiers "died in defense of what they believed to be right", the second said they were "our sons and brothers, who fell as soldiers in the Confederate army", and the third, which was ultimately adopted by the committee, read in full: "The Daughters of Old Hampshire Erect This Tribute of Affection to Her Heroic Sons Who Fell in Defence of Southern Rights".

== Construction ==
Once the design and inscription had been chosen, the association appointed committees to select a contractor. At the end of the process, the contract was awarded to the Gaddes Brothers firm of Baltimore. They were asked to fabricate a white Italian marble monument. The memorial was designed, sculpted, and manufactured at a cost of US$1,133.63. According to United Daughters of the Confederacy historian Mary Bell Foote, the words "Southern Rights" were initially omitted from the end of the memorial's inscription during its fabrication due to the "bitter feelings at the time" following the American Civil War, and Federal statutes banning such monuments. After the memorial's components were packaged for shipping to Romney, the words "Southern Rights" were secretly etched into the white marble and the components quickly boarded over and shipped.

The memorial's components were delivered to Indian Mound Cemetery on September 14, 1867, and it was erected at its present location by a group of Romney volunteers. Bob Fisher was paid US$5.00 for raising the earthen mound around the monument's location and US$4.11 for providing lodging to one of the Gaddes brothers at his residence. William Sheetz was paid US$18.80 for building the memorial's raised mound and supporting foundation. Twelve days later on September 26, the Confederate Memorial was formally dedicated in a public ceremony. (Note: Maxwell & Swisher 1897, p. 695. At the end of their chapter "Closing Events of the War" in History of Hampshire County, West Virginia, Maxwell and Swisher give special recognition to the following individuals for their efforts in funding and erecting the Confederate Memorial, although their specific roles are not given: "Mrs. James D. Armstrong, Mrs. James N. Morehead, Misses Susie M. Pancake, Susie Poling, Louise Greitzner, Lizzie Inskeep, Lieutenant C. W. Pattie, D. W. Endler.")

== Location and design ==
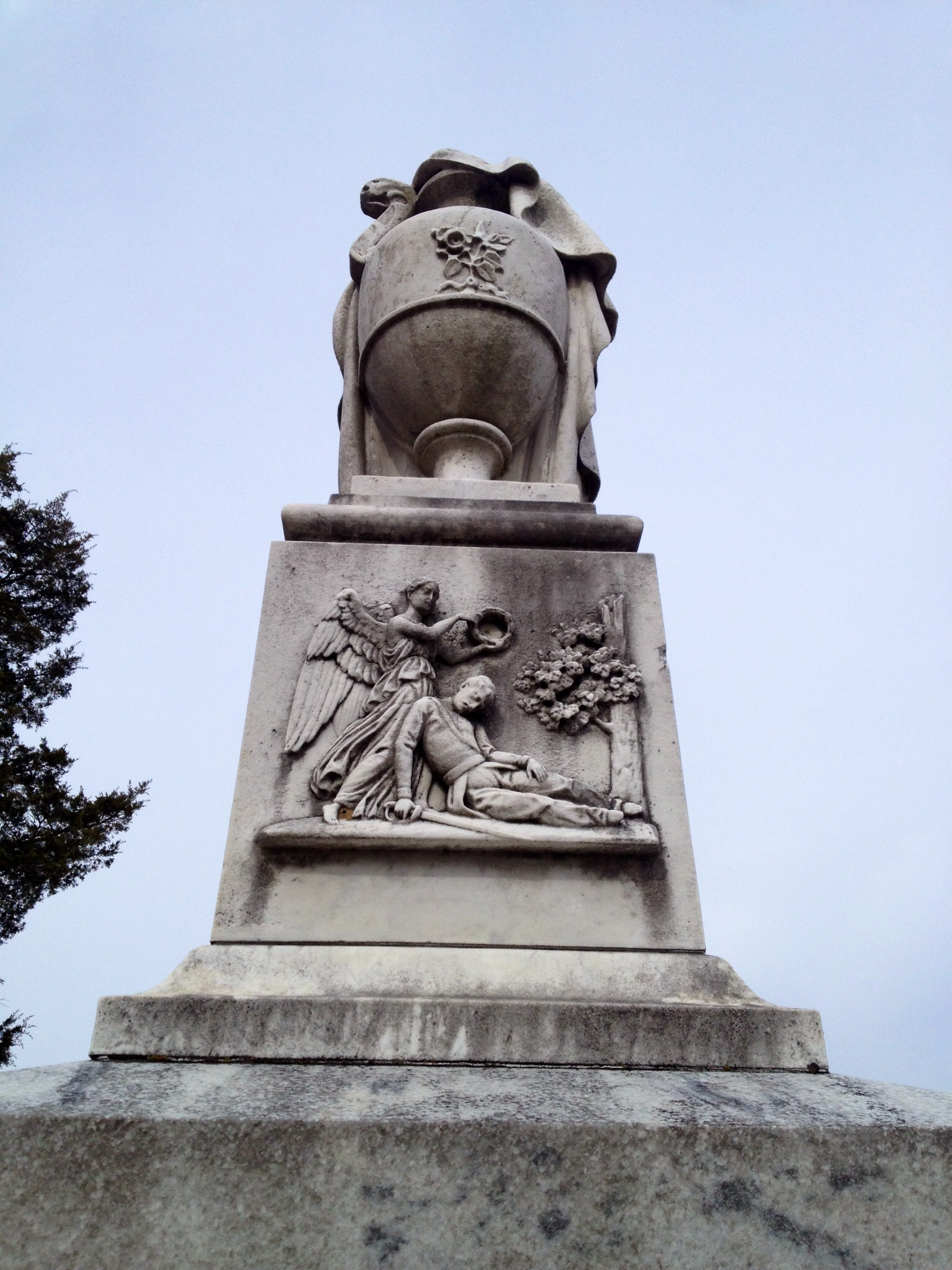
A high relief on the monument's top block represents either Fame or an angel placing a laurel wreath upon the head of a dying soldier clasping his sword.

The Confederate Memorial stands upon a raised mound ringed by five boxwoods within the original section of Indian Mound Cemetery, not far from the cemetery's entrance. Several family interment plots surround the memorial and its circular raised lawn. A burial ground where Confederate and Union dead were buried during the American Civil War lies adjacent to the memorial.

The Confederate Memorial is in the form of an four-sided monument, measuring 4 square feet (0.37 m^{2}) at its base and 12 feet (3.7 m) in height. The structure's pedestal consists of two major stylized blocks of white marble, topped by a sculpture of a cloth draped urn. Carved into the façade of the smaller top block of the memorial is a high relief that represents either Fame or an angel placing a laurel wreath upon the head of a dying soldier clasping his sword. Below, on the façade of the larger block, is the inscription: "The Daughters of Old Hampshire Erect This Tribute of Affection to Her Heroic Sons Who Fell in Defence of Southern Rights." The other three sides of the memorial contain the engraved names of 125 Hampshire County men who died for the Confederate cause. A number representing the total fallen Confederates was not included in the memorial as it was not precisely known at the time of the monument's construction. The memorial's foundation block bears the date of its erection, "1867".

=== Inscribed names ===
The list of 125 names engraved on the monument consists of four captains, seven lieutenants (one of which was a chaplain), three sergeants, and 119 privates. Since the memorial's erection in 1867, several names of Hampshire County's Confederate dead were found to have been omitted from the memorial. These names have been included in the "Confederate Honor Roll" along with those names etched in the memorial and the names of Confederate veterans. Each of these names is recited during the annual ceremony held on Hampshire County Confederate Memorial Day. The following is the list of Confederate dead etched into the Confederate Memorial:

Military rank	Inscribed names
Captains	G. F. Sheetz, A. Smith, G. W. Stump, J. M. Lovett
Lieutenants	M. Blue, J. Buzzard, J. Earsom, H. Engle, W. F. Johnson, J. N. Moorehead, F. D. Sherrard, Rev. J. S. Reese
Sergeants	B. W. Armstrong, J. C. Leps, G. Cheshire
Privates	A. T. Pugh, J. W. Park, S. Park, J. W. Poland, J. Peer, R. J. Parran, C. Parran, H. Powell, N. Pownall, J. W. Ream, G. W. Ruckman, L. Spaid, P. Stump, H. Senoff, A. Shingleton, J. Stewart, S. Swisher, E. Gaylor, M. Taylor, J. Taylor, E. P. Ward, I. Wolfe, J. Washington, M. Watkins, H. Wilson, G. Shoemaker, L. D. Shanholtzer, J. Strother, W. Unglesbee, B. Wills, J. Haines, J. F. Hass, M. Harmison, A. Hollenback, G. Hott, E. Hartley, B. Hare, –. Householder, M. V. Inskeep, J. Johnson, J. H. Johnson, T. Keely, J. Kern, S. Loy, E. Milleson, O. Milleson, S. Mohler, F. M. Myers, J. W. Marker, T. McGraw, I. Mills, J. Merritt, J. W. Pugh, O. V. Pugh, J. Kump, P. Noland, J. Rudolph, J. M. Reese, M. V. Reid, W. O. Lupton, J. Noreland, J. Starns, F. C. Sechrist, G. W. Strother, J. D. Adams, I. P. Armstrong, E. Allen, J. W. Baker, H. Baker, J. W. Barley, H. Bird, W. J. Blue, T. T. Brooks, R. Brown, J. W. Boro, I. D. Carroll, J. Cupp, J. S. Davis, J. A. Daily, J. Davy, S. Engly, J. Floury, J. Furlow, I. V. Gibson, R. C. Grace, T. T. Gross, R. Gill, J. P. Greitzner, A. Haines, J. J. Arnold, F. Abee, A. J. Baker, William Baker, J. Bumgarner, Morgan Brill, Mat Brill, G. Delaplains, J. Doughett, J. Engle, C. Garvin, G. R. Garvin, J. Hammock, T. Harrison

== Restoration ==
In 1984, the Confederate Memorial underwent an extensive restoration. The monument had darkened due to weathering. The surfaces of the memorial were sanded and sealed for future protection. This restoration effort was funded through charitable contributions. The names of the contributors were inscribed within the same treasurer's book used to record the memorial's inaugural contributions on June 6, 1866. The monument's restoration cost totaled US$2,850.

== Hampshire County Confederate Memorial Day ==
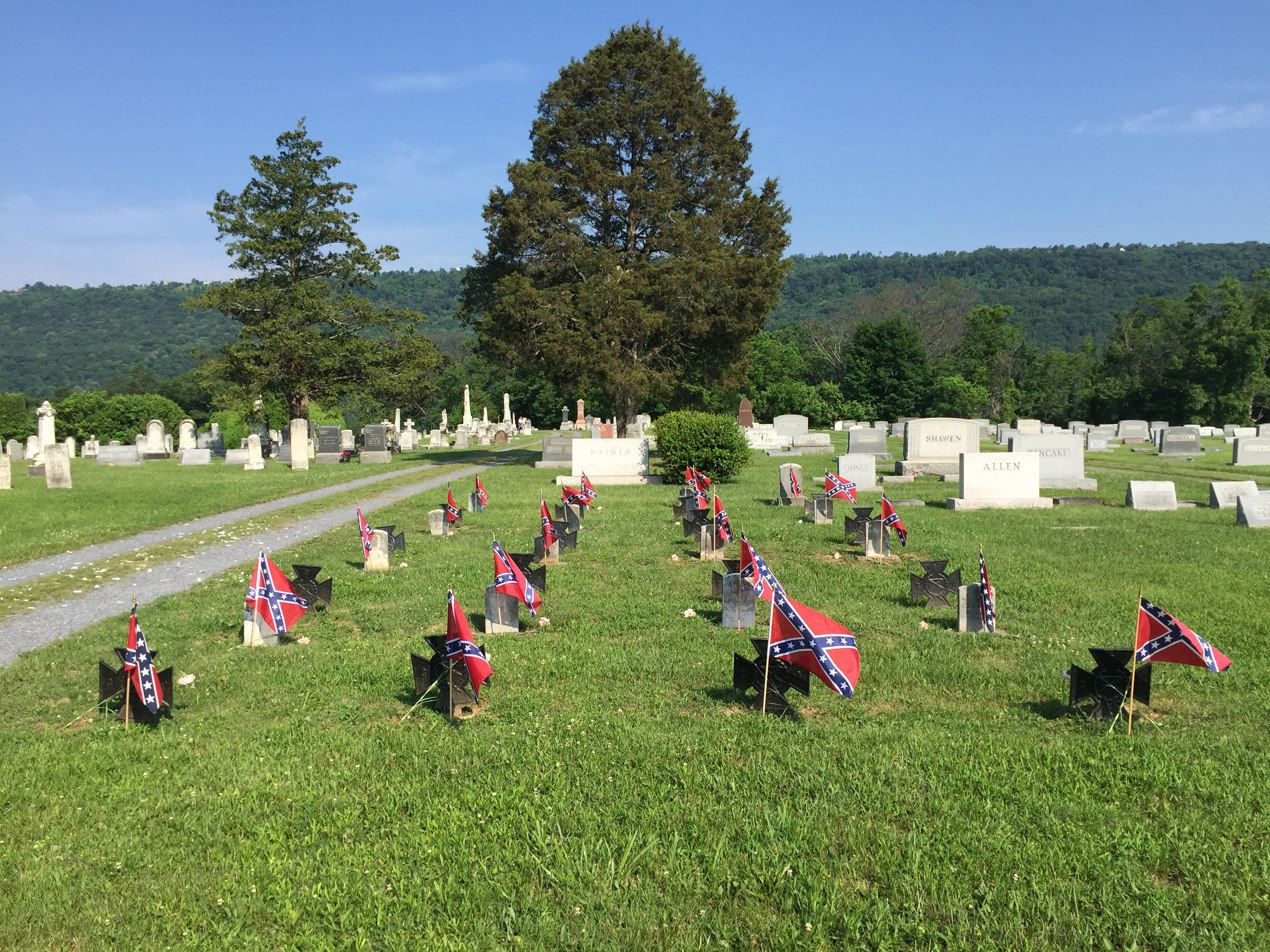
Headstones (pictured) at the interment sites of Confederate war dead in Indian Mound Cemetery, adjacent to the Confederate Memorial

The tradition of decorating the Confederate graves in Indian Mound Cemetery has continued annually since June 1, 1866, and occurs on the first Saturday in June, which is known as Hampshire County Confederate Memorial Day or June Decoration Day. On this day, participants in the ceremony march down Main Street (U.S. Route 50) through Romney with American Civil War reenactors carrying Confederate flags. A handmade evergreen garland measuring 30 feet (9.1 m) in length is suspended from the Confederate Memorial, along with evergreen wreaths. Flowers and Confederate flags are also placed at each of the Confederate headstones. The decorations are usually placed at the memorial and upon the Confederate gravestones by reenactors. Invited speakers address participants. A roll of honor is recited at the memorial, followed by a musket salute. Ceremony participants include descendants of the founding members of the Confederate Memorial Association.

== Significance ==
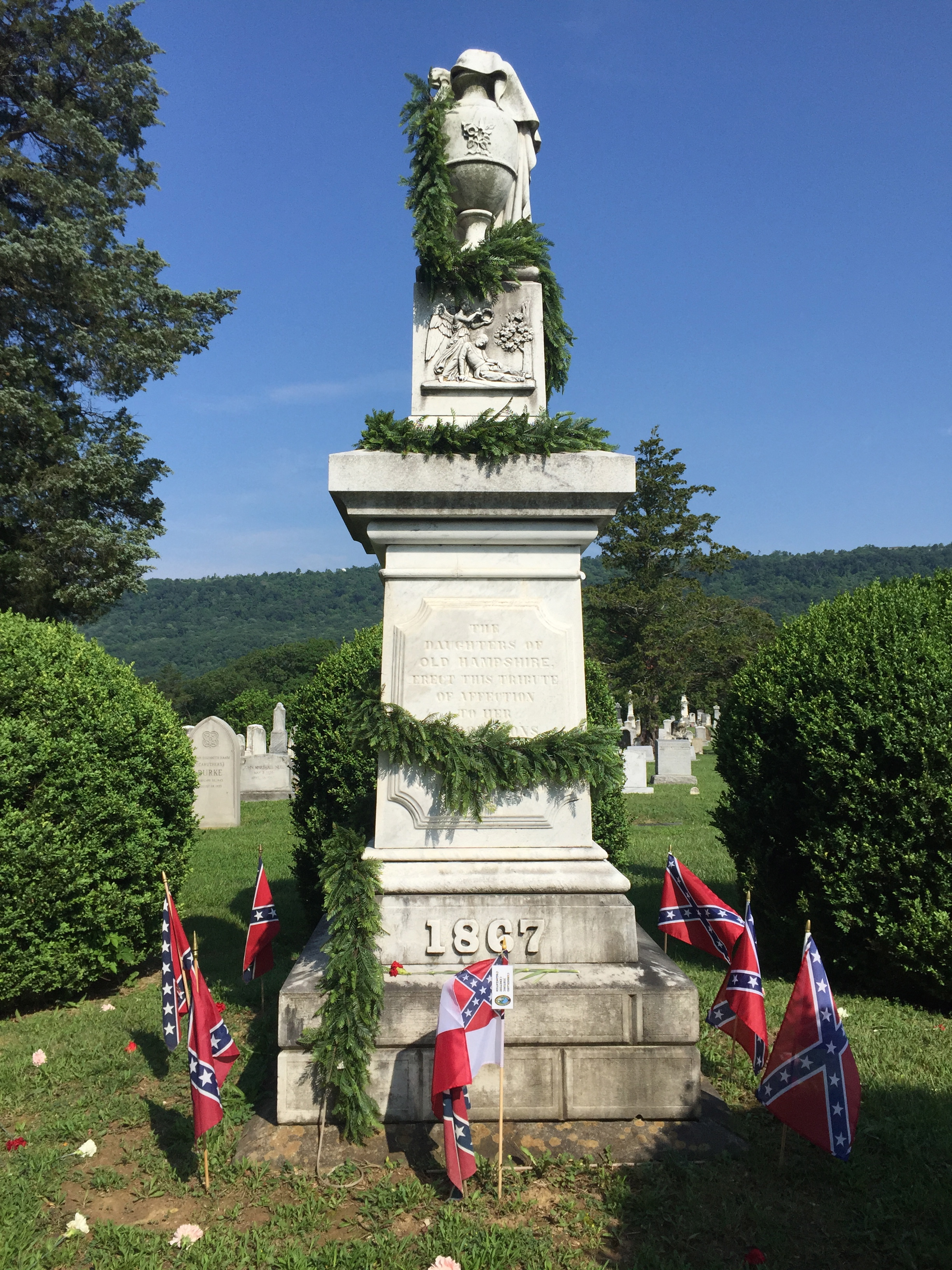
The Confederate Memorial decorated for Confederate Memorial Day in 2015

The construction of the Confederate Memorial marked the beginning of an era of post-war revitalization for Hampshire County following the American Civil War. The memorial became a symbol of the county's restored confidence. The citizens of Hampshire County worked together to reestablish and rebuild the institutions, municipal buildings, and businesses destroyed during the war. The Confederate Memorial Association that constructed the monument was a part of a larger movement throughout the post-war American South, especially in Virginia, which sought to provide suitable interments for Confederate war dead. Historian Caroline E. Janney averred that these "Ladies' Memorial Associations" used "gender in the interest of Confederate politics", which laid the groundwork for the establishment of the Lost Cause of the Confederacy belief.

The memorial is among the first monuments erected to memorialize the Confederate dead in the United States. Romney's claim to have the first Confederate Memorial is disputed by Cheraw, South Carolina, as its monument was dedicated two months prior on July 26, 1867. However, the Cheraw memorial omits the mention of "Confederacy", "Confederate", or "Southern".

== Vandalism ==
As part of the 2–4 June 2017 observance of Hampshire County Confederate Memorial Day and the 150th anniversary of the Confederate Memorial's construction, participants installed a tombstone, a Cross of Honor, and Confederate flags at the gravesite of African-American Alfred Whiting in nearby African-American Mount Pisgah Benevolence Cemetery. In addition, participants performed a ceremony and presentation on Whiting's Confederate service at his gravesite. However, Whiting's status as a Confederate veteran is a matter of debate among local historians. In August 2017, public debate over Confederate monuments and memorials was exacerbated by the Unite the Right rally in Charlottesville, Virginia. While this debate was centered around the placement of Confederate monuments in public spaces, the Confederate Memorial in Romney is located on private land owned by the Indian Mound Cemetery Association Board of Directors.

Between 16 and 17 September 2017, the Confederate Memorial was vandalized. The unknown perpetrators spray painted black graffiti on the monument and removed Confederate flags previously emplaced nearby the monument. Papers with vulgar language were also left behind by the perpetrators. Following the vandalism, the damaged parts of the monument were covered with cardboard and tape.

== See also ==
- List of historic sites in Hampshire County, West Virginia
- Romney, West Virginia, during the American Civil War
- West Virginia in the American Civil War

== Bibliography ==
- Ayers, Edward L.; Gallagher, Gary W.; Torget, Andrew J., eds. (2008). Crucible of the Civil War: Virginia from Secession to Commemoration. Charlottesville, Virginia and London: University of Virginia Press. ISBN 978-0-8139-3049-7. OCLC 5792807413. Archived from the original on April 24, 2016 – via Google Books.
- Brannon, Selden W., ed. (1976). Historic Hampshire: A Symposium of Hampshire County and Its People, Past and Present. Parsons, West Virginia: McClain Printing Company. ISBN 978-0-87012-236-1. OCLC 3121468.
- Chambers, S. Allen (2004). Buildings of West Virginia. Oxford; New York: Oxford University Press. ISBN 978-0-19-516548-7. OCLC 53315276.
- Federal Writers' Project (1937). Historic Romney 1762–1937. Romney, West Virginia: Federal Writers' Project, The Town Council of Romney, West Virginia. OCLC 2006735.
- Johnson, Kristina Dunn (2009). No Holier Spot of Ground: Confederate Monuments & Cemeteries of South Carolina. Charleston, South Carolina: The History Press. ISBN 978-1-59629-397-7. OCLC 301948612. Archived from the original on January 3, 2014 – via Google Books.
- Maxwell, Hu; Swisher, Howard Llewellyn (1897). History of Hampshire County, West Virginia From Its Earliest Settlement to the Present. Morgantown, West Virginia: A. Brown Boughner, Printer. OCLC 680931891. OL 23304577M.
- Munske, Roberta R.; Kerns, Wilmer L., eds. (2004). Hampshire County, West Virginia, 1754–2004. Romney, West Virginia: The Hampshire County 250th Anniversary Committee. ISBN 978-0-9715738-2-6. OCLC 55983178.
- Riley, Elihu S. (December 1906). "The First Confederate Monument". Book of the Royal Blue. 10. Baltimore: Passenger Department, Baltimore and Ohio Railroad: 17–18. OCLC 8378751. Archived from the original on January 3, 2014 – via Google Books.
