= Fort Pearsall =

French and Indian War-era fort in colonial Virginia

Coordinates: 39°20′35″N 78°46′00″W

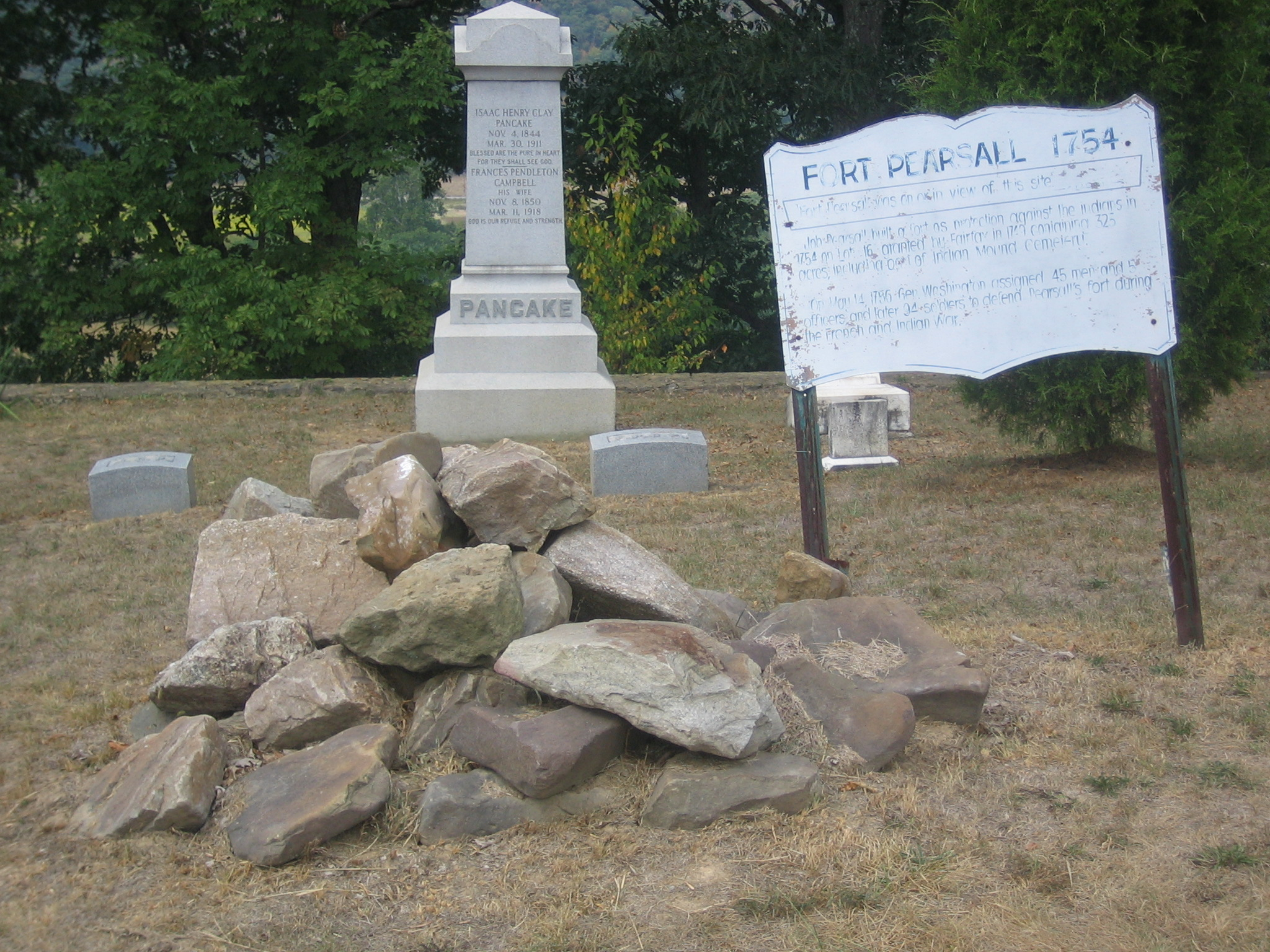
Fort Pearsall marker at Indian Mound Cemetery

Fort Pearsall was an early frontier fort constructed in 1756 in Romney, West Virginia (then known as Pearsall's Flats, Virginia) to protect local settlers in the South Branch Potomac River valley against Native American raids. The area around present-day Romney had been settled as early as 1725 by hunters and traders in the valley.

Fort Pearsall was originally erected as a log house with a stockade by Job Pearsall (Pearsal or Pearsoll) and his brother John on their plantation in an area between Indian Mound Cemetery and the South Branch Potomac River near the river crossing of the old Fort Loudoun Road (Northwestern Turnpike) to Winchester in 1738, according to tradition. However, a look at when forts were built in the region indicates that the fort was likely built when a fort was really needed; in 1755 in the aftermath of the failed Braddock campaign in the opening days of the French and Indian War. Possibly, Job Pearsall and his brother John constructed the stockade to protect the settlers of Pearsall's Flats and the South Branch Potomac Valley. The brothers also constructed a number of homes for settlers that same year.

Pearsall’s stockade was provisioned as a fort for the Virginia Regiment, a bona fide military force raised by the colony, by George Washington in 1755 and garrisoned in 1756. The fort came under the command of Captain Robert McKenzie during the French and Indian War. Fort Pearsall was garrisoned at various times during the war until 1758. At around 1758, there were at least 100 people living in the general area of Pearsall's Flats, though this can't be verified by historical records. The number seems suspect unless the "general area" includes the South Branch River Valley eight miles south to The Trough and some 15 miles to the north at the confluence with the North Branch Potomac River.

After the hostilities in the area, Thomas Fairfax, 6th Lord Fairfax of Cameron recognized the fact that more settlers would be interested in moving into the South Branch Potomac Valley and that he would gain substantial revenue from the sales of plots of land in the Pearsall's Flats vicinity. Lord Fairfax sent a survey party to Pearsall's in 1762 to formally lay out the town into 100 lots. Lord Fairfax then renamed the town Romney in honor of the Cinque Ports city on the English Channel. Some confusion ensued for several decades concerning the ownership of land within the town as counterclaims were made by the original settlers and those who purchased lots laid out by Lord Fairfax's surveyors.

According to oral tradition, Pearsall's Fort was garrisoned again in 1774 for Lord Dunmore's War, however, it cannot be documented in the historical records. Today, a marker stands in Indian Mound Cemetery by the "Yellow Banks" overlooking the South Branch commemorating Fort Pearsall. Alongside the marker is a pile of what are thought to be remnants of the old fort.

== See also ==
- List of historic sites in Hampshire County, West Virginia
