= John Rinehart Blue =

American military officer, educator, businessperson, and politician

- Blue's portrait in the West Virginia Blue Book (1955)

Member of the West Virginia House of Delegates from Hampshire County
- In office 1953–1959
- Preceded by: William L. Thompson
- Succeeded by: William Basil Slonaker

Personal details
- Born: October 13, 1905 Romney, West Virginia, U.S.
- Died: May 27, 1965 (aged 59) Augusta, West Virginia, U.S.
- Resting place: Indian Mound Cemetery
- Party: Democratic Party
- Spouse: Madeline Stanford McDowell Blue
- Relations: John David Blue (father); Mary Buckner Rinehart (mother); Lt. John Monroe Blue (grandfather)
- Children: 3
- Education: Presbyterian College (B.S.); West Virginia University
- Profession: Educator, businessperson, and politician

Military service
- Branch/service: United States Army; United States Army Reserve
- Years of service: 1942–1946 (USA)
- Rank: first lieutenant
- Battles/wars: World War II

John Rinehart Blue (October 13, 1905 – May 27, 1965) was an American military officer, educator, businessperson, and politician in the U.S. state of West Virginia. Blue was a Democratic member of the West Virginia House of Delegates representing Hampshire County, from 1953 until 1959.

Born in 1905 in Romney, West Virginia, Blue was a grandson of Lieutenant John Monroe Blue, a member of the 11th Virginia Cavalry during the American Civil War. Blue graduated from Presbyterian College in 1928 and completed his graduate studies at West Virginia University. He enlisted in the U.S. Army and served from 1942 until 1946, and afterward served as a first lieutenant in the 398th Airborne Infantry Regiment, 100th Airborne Division of the U.S. Army Reserve. From 1948 until his death, Blue operated a Ben Franklin five and dime variety store in Romney. He also served as principal of the West Virginia Schools for the Deaf and Blind Advanced School for the Deaf.

In August 1953, West Virginia governor, William C. Marland, appointed Blue to fill William L. Thompson's seat in the West Virginia House of Delegates, and Blue was sworn in the following December. He was reelected to his seat in 1954 and 1956; however, he lost in the 1958 Democratic Party primary to William Basil Slonaker. Blue attempted to win back his seat in 1962 but lost to Slonaker in the primary. Blue continued to operate his Benjamin Franklin store and remained actively involved in Romney community organizations until his death in 1965.

== Early life and education ==
John Rinehart Blue was born on October 13, 1905, in Romney, West Virginia, to John David Blue and his wife Mary Buckner Rinehart Blue. Blue's father, John David Blue, was a local businessperson, who served as the manager of Romney's Farmers Exchange for 25 years, and was a son of Lieutenant John Monroe Blue, a prominent member of the 11th Virginia Cavalry of the Confederate States Army during the American Civil War. Blue's mother, Mary Buckner Rinehart Blue, was a homemaker and a member of local organizations, to include the Romney Women's Club.

Blue attended the local Romney schools, and subsequently attended Presbyterian College in Clinton, South Carolina, where he was a member of the Rapier Club and served as a corporal in the school's Reserve Officers' Training Corps. Blue graduated from Presbyterian with a Bachelor of Science degree in 1928. He later completed graduate studies at West Virginia University in Morgantown, West Virginia.

== Early career ==
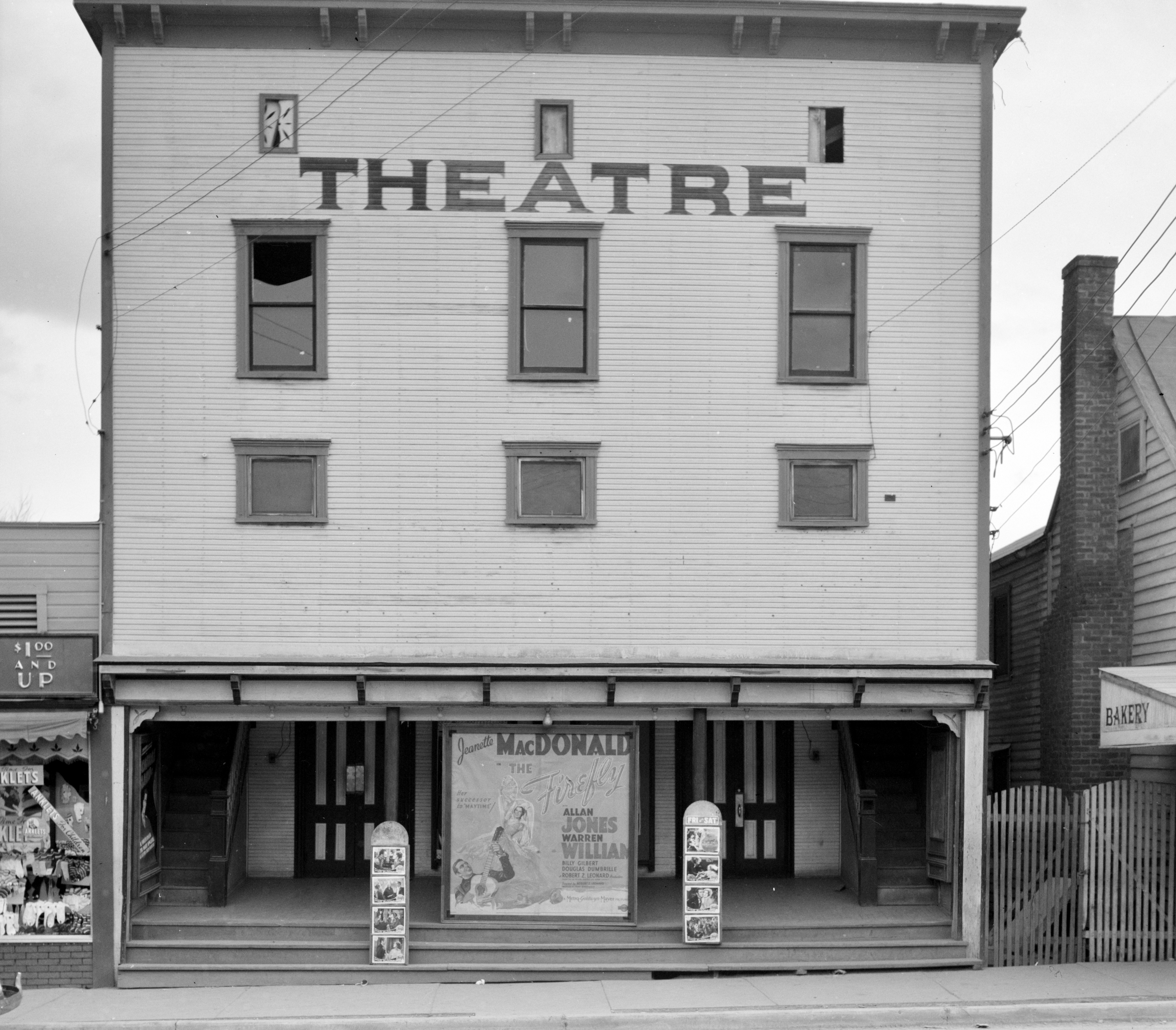
The old Romney theatre (photographed in 1938), which became the second location for Blue's Ben Franklin store

Blue became affiliated with the Advanced School for the Deaf of the West Virginia Schools for the Deaf and Blind (WVSDB) in 1933. He became principal of the Advanced School for the Deaf and served in this position until June 30, 1952. While serving at WVSDB, Blue served as a member of the committee for the Deaf School's Boy Scout Troop No. 66. In 1960, Blue unsuccessfully applied for the WVSDB superintendent's position.

During World War II, Blue enlisted as a private in the U.S. Army at the age of 37 on November 20, 1942, in Clarksburg, West Virginia. Following his enlistment, Blue was inducted into the U.S. Army in Columbus, Ohio. He separated from the U.S. Army in May 1946 with the rank of first lieutenant. Blue later served as a first lieutenant in Company G, 398th Airborne Infantry Regiment, 100th Airborne Division of the United States Army Reserve.

In October 1948, Blue purchased the J. W. Jackson Store, a Ben Franklin five and dime variety store, which was housed in the Blue Building owned by his father John David Blue, on Main Street in Romney. The Blue Building was later razed for the construction of the Pioneer Restaurant. Between 1955 and 1956, Blue relocated the Ben Franklin store to a three-story building on Main Street, which had previously housed Romney's theater. Following Blue's death, the Ben Franklin store was owned and operated by his wife, Madeline, until it ceased operation and closed in 1991.

== Political career ==
Following the resignation of William L. Thompson from the West Virginia House of Delegates on August 28, 1953, West Virginia governor, William C. Marland, appointed Blue to fill Thompson's vacant delegate seat representing Hampshire County on September 23, 1953, until the end of the term on November 30, 1954. He was sworn in as a house member on December 8, 1953.

In May 1954, Blue filed for re-election to his seat in the Democratic Party primary election. He was nominated for re-election to his delegate seat by Hampshire County Democratic voters in August 1954, having received 729 votes compared to 536 votes for James W. Short and 517 votes for Harold L. Welker, his Democratic opponents from the Romney area. Blue subsequently ran in the general election on November 2, 1954 for his delegate seat and won, receiving 1859 votes compared to 1355 votes for his opponent, Republican candidate Earl A. Loy of Augusta. As part of a West Virginia Legislature survey of state institutions, Blue participated in a delegation to inspect Potomac State College in 1955.

Blue filed as a candidate for reelection to his seat in the Democratic primary election in 1956. He won his primary election in May 1956, and was reelected to his seat in November 1956 after beating his Republican challenger Ben F. Slane of Slanesville, with 2,804 votes to 1,738. In January 1957, he was named to the House of Delegates' banking committee. Blue filed for inclusion on the ballot in the Democratic Party primary election in 1958, but later lost in the primary to William Basil Slonaker of Dillons Run, who won Blue's delegate seat in the 1958 general election. Blue attempted to recapture his delegate seat in 1962 but was defeated in the Democratic Party primary election by incumbent Slonaker, 579 to 1430 votes. In February 1960, Blue filed to run in the Democratic primary for sheriff of Hampshire County. Governor Wally Barron appointed Blue to a state committee on conservation education on August 24, 1962. The committee was established to provide West Virginians with "an understanding, knowledge and appreciation of the importance" of the state's natural resources.

== Personal life ==
Blue married Madeline Stanford McDowell on September 6, 1938. McDowell was the daughter of Angus and Madeline Stanford McDowell of Camden and Montgomery, Alabama. Blue and his wife Madeline had three children together. Blue's wife Madeline was a teacher for the primary grades at the WVSDB School for the Deaf for 35 years, served as president of the West Virginia Parent Teachers Association, and served as a member of the Hampshire County Board of Education for 28 years.

Blue was a life-long member of the Romney Presbyterian Church, where he served as the church's treasurer and as chairperson of the church's board of deacons. He was also a member of the Hampshire Post 91 of the American Legion and a member of Romney's Kiwanis club.

== Later life and death ==
Blue died suddenly on May 27, 1965, of coronary thrombosis caused by coronary artery disease, on his farm in Augusta, West Virginia. His funeral was held at the Romney Presbyterian Church, and he was interred at Indian Mound Cemetery in Romney on May 29, 1965.

== Bibliography ==
- McLendon, M. M., ed. (1927). PAC SAC 1927. Vol. 14. Clinton, South Carolina: The Senior Class of the Presbyterian College – via Internet Archive.
- Myers, J. Howard, ed. (1954). West Virginia Blue Book (PDF). Vol. 38. Charleston, West Virginia: Jarrett Printing Company. ISSN 0364-7323. OCLC 1251675. Archived (PDF) from the original on January 3, 2021 – via West Virginia Legislature.
- Myers, J. Howard, ed. (1955). West Virginia Blue Book (PDF). Vol. 39. Charleston, West Virginia: Jarrett Printing Company. ISSN 0364-7323. OCLC 1251675. Archived (PDF) from the original on January 3, 2021 – via West Virginia Legislature.
- Myers, J. Howard, ed. (1957). West Virginia Blue Book (PDF). Vol. 41. Charleston, West Virginia: Jarrett Printing Company. ISSN 0364-7323. OCLC 1251675. Archived (PDF) from the original on October 16, 2020 – via West Virginia Legislature.

West Virginia House of Delegates
Preceded by William L. Thompson	Member of the West Virginia House of Delegates from Hampshire County; 1953–1959	Succeeded by William Basil Slonaker
