= Indian Mound Cemetery =

Cemetery in Hampshire County, West Virginia, US

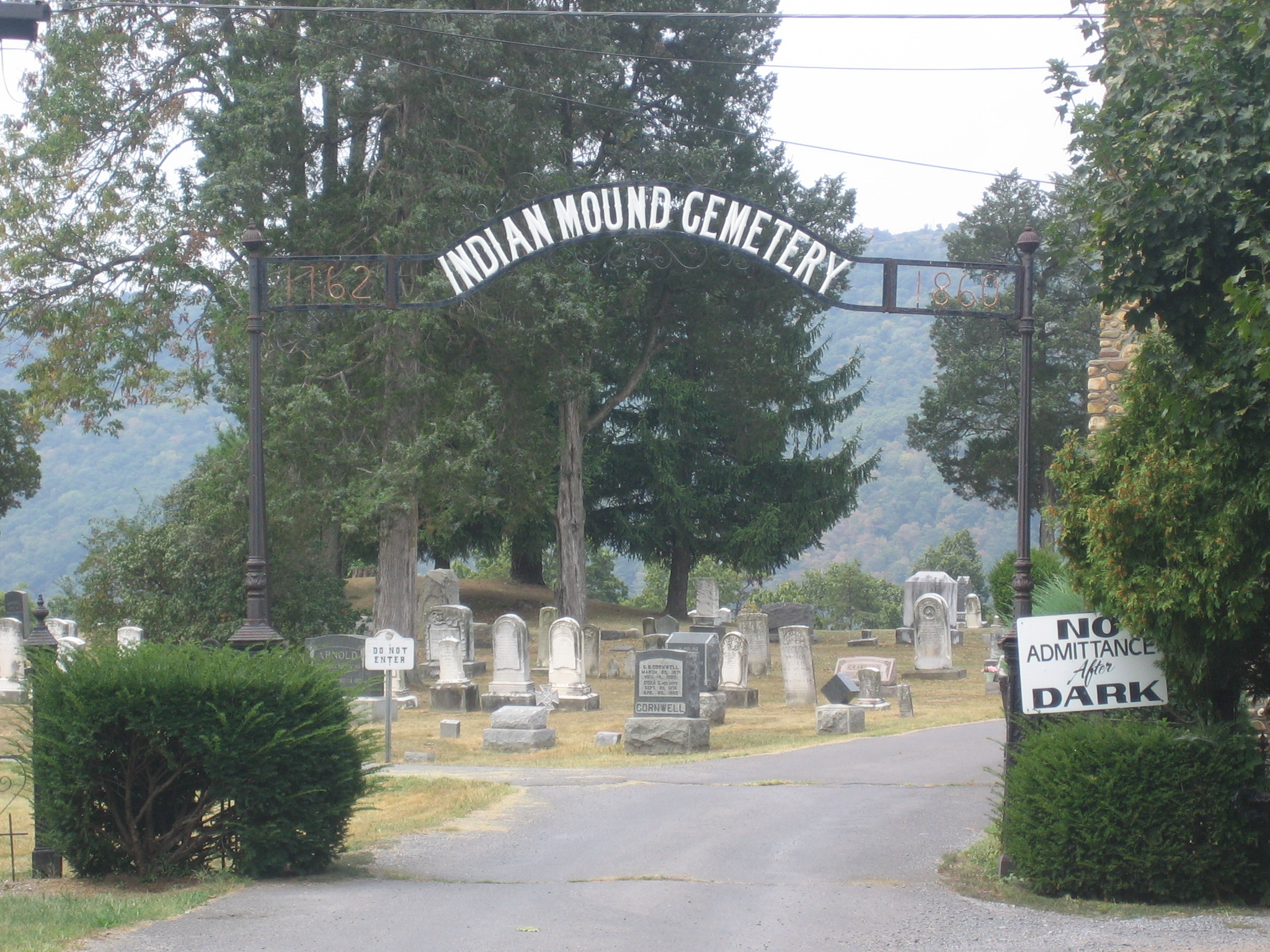
- Indian Mound Cemetery entrance along U.S. Route 50
- Interactive map of Indian Mound Cemetery

Details
- Established: 1859
- Location: Romney, West Virginia
- Country: United States
- Coordinates: 39°20′33″N 78°45′57″W
- Type: Private
- Owned by: Indian Mound Cemetery Association, Inc.
- No. of graves: >2,500
- Find a Grave: Indian Mound Cemetery
- The Political Graveyard: Indian Mound Cemetery

Indian Mound Cemetery is a cemetery located along the Northwestern Turnpike (U.S. Route 50) on a promontory of the "Yellow Banks" overlooking the South Branch Potomac River and Mill Creek Mountain in Romney, West Virginia, United States. The cemetery is centered on a Hopewellian mound, known as the Romney Indian Mound. Indian Mound Cemetery is also the site of Fort Pearsall, the Confederate Memorial, Parsons Bell Tower, and reinterments from Romney's Old Presbyterian Cemetery. The cemetery is currently owned and maintained by the Indian Mound Cemetery Association, Inc.

Indian Mound Cemetery is the burial site of two governors of West Virginia, a United States House Representative, a United States Secretary of the Army, an owner of the Washington Redskins, and descendants of the family of George Washington.

Days before the 150th anniversary of the Confederate Monument's dedication was to be observed, it was vandalized. The vandalism read "reparations now", and was done using black spray paint. The damage to the monument has since been repaired.

== History ==
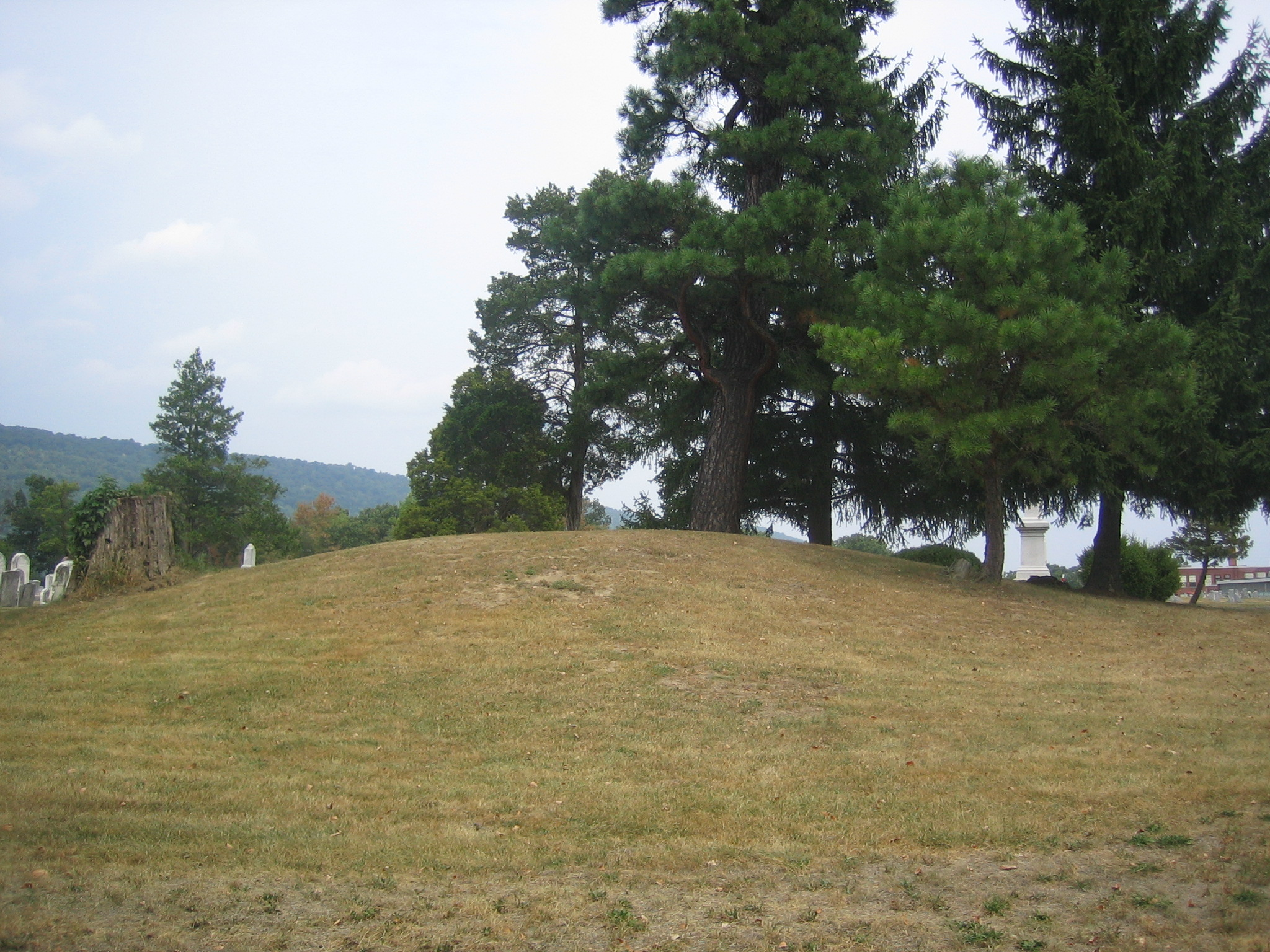
Romney Indian Mound

=== Romney Indian Mound ===
==== Physical description ====
The Romney Indian mound is a burial mound that measures 7 feet (2.1 m) in height and approximately 15 feet (4.6 m) in diameter, according to the site marker. Since this marker was erected, further research indicates the mound has been opened at some point in the past. It is the largest of the remaining mounds discovered in West Virginia's Eastern Panhandle. The Romney Indian Mound is representative of thousands of small Middle and Late Woodland burial mounds that occurred throughout much of eastern North America. Throughout its history, the Romney Indian Mound has traditionally been covered in pine trees, of which several remain as of 2010.

==== Origins ====
The Romney Indian Mound was constructed at what was once the crossroads of the Shawnee Trail, running north and south, and the east-west Indian Road (later the Northwestern Turnpike and U.S. Route 50) leading to the Allegheny Mountains.

The original owner of the mound, David Gibson, gave the site to the city of Romney on the condition that the mound would not be disturbed. For this reason, the city has never allowed the mound to be excavated. The Smithsonian Institution suggests the Romney Indian Mound possibly dates from between 500 and 1000 CE given the ages of similar mounds it excavated in the Eastern Panhandle. The mound was likely constructed by peoples of the Hopewell culture, who resided within West Virginia between 500 BC and 1,000 CE.

The Romney Indian Mound is perhaps the only accessible mound east of the Allegheny Mountains that has been preserved. This is mostly due in part to both its location high above the flood plain of the South Branch Potomac River and that it was never plowed over.

=== Indian Mound Cemetery Company and Association ===
Several years prior to the onset of the American Civil War, Romney's Old Presbyterian Cemetery at Gravel Lane and High Street had become full and the city of Romney sought to procure a larger tract for a new spacious cemetery.

Indian Mound Cemetery was incorporated by an act of the Virginia General Assembly around 1859. The land was conveyed to the Indian Mound Cemetery Company by David Gibson on May 31, 1860. The land conveyed by Gibson had previously been a tract of his nearby Sycamore Dale plantation. The cemetery's original design consisted of two plats: the higher plat around the Romney Indian Mound and the lower plat above Sulphur Spring Run reserved for the burials of African Americans. The latter separated from Indian Mound Cemetery and became known as the Mount Pisgah Benevolence Cemetery, which is currently maintained by the Mount Pisgah United Methodist Church.

On May 22, 1869, a meeting was held at the Hampshire County Courthouse to elect a board of directors of the Indian Mound Cemetery Company. The company operated the cemetery until it was incorporated by the state of West Virginia on August 25, 1925, as the Indian Mound Cemetery Association, Inc. The association has been administered by a self-perpetuating board of directors since 1925.

On October 6, 1925, an additional five acres to the north were purchased by the Indian Mound Cemetery Association, Inc. from Hiram C. and Katie Feidner Cooper.

=== American Civil War ===
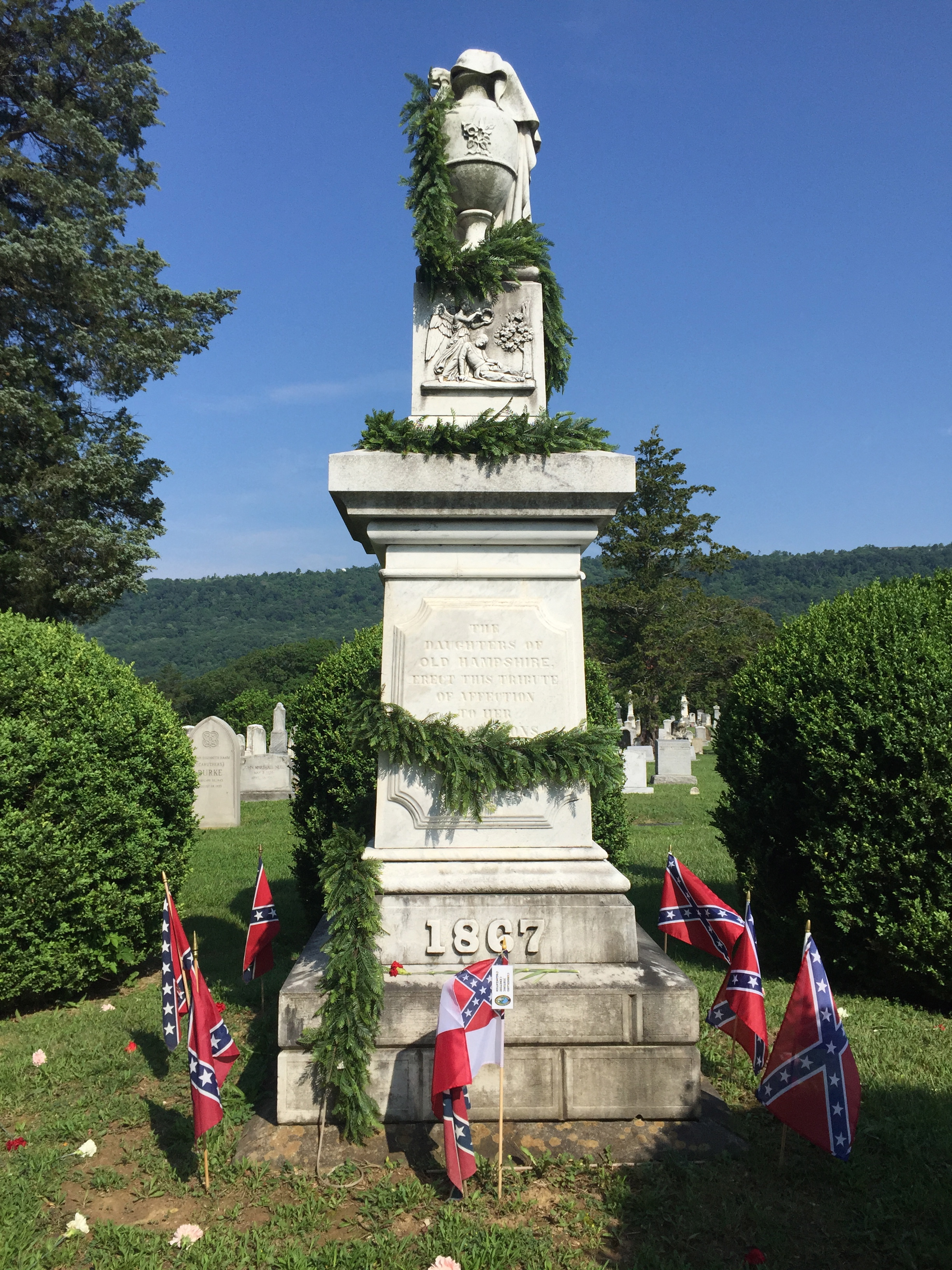
Confederate Memorial

==== Battle of Romney ====
Due to its strategic location on a bluff commanding views of the South Branch Potomac River, the Romney Covered Bridge, and the Northwestern Turnpike for half a mile, Indian Mound Cemetery was an important lookout position during the American Civil War. On October 22, 1861, Union Army General Scott ordered General Benjamin Franklin Kelley to concentrate his forces at New Creek (now known as Keyser) and attack and capture Romney. Kelley left New Creek early on the morning of October 27 and the Confederate States Army at Romney began preparations for his arrival. The Confederates planted a twelve-pound rifle cannon and a mountain howitzer in Indian Mound Cemetery ready to fire at the lead of the Union Army column as it emerged from Mechanicsburg Gap in Mill Creek Mountain. The Union forces drove in and advanced to Indian Mound Cemetery where the Confederate forces made a stand and opened fire on the Federals with the twelve-pound rifle cannon and the mountain howitzer. A severe cannonade took place between the artillery of both the Union and Confederate forces for an hour.

==== Burials ====
Also during the American Civil War, Indian Mound Cemetery was used as a burial ground by both Union and Confederate armies. The majority of soldiers killed in the vicinity of Romney were buried in blankets in the cemetery, many whose names are unknown. Captain Richard Ashby, the brother of Confederate General Turner Ashby, was interred with all the honors of war under a giant oak tree on July 4, 1861, in Indian Mound Cemetery shortly after his death at nearby Washington Bottom Farm on July 3 from wounds received in a skirmish on the Baltimore and Ohio Railroad. Turner Ashby attended his brother's funeral at Indian Mound Cemetery where his behavior was described in Edward A. Pollard's Southern History of the War as touching:

He stood over the grave, took his brother's sword, broke it and threw it into the opening; clasped his hands and looked upward as if in resignation; and then, pressing his lips as if in the bitterness of grief, while a tear rolled down his cheek, he turned without a word, mounted his horse and rode away. Thenceforth his name was a terror to the enemy.

Ashby's body was removed from the cemetery to Stonewall Cemetery in Winchester, Virginia, in October 1862 where it was reinterred next to Ashby's brother General Turner Ashby. Their grave is marked "The Brothers Ashby."

==== Confederate Memorial ====
The Confederate Memorial was erected by local ladies in honor of Hampshire County's Confederate dead and dedicated in Indian Mound Cemetery on September 26, 1867. It is considered one of the oldest, if not the first, permanent memorials to Confederate dead in the United States.

== Notable interments ==
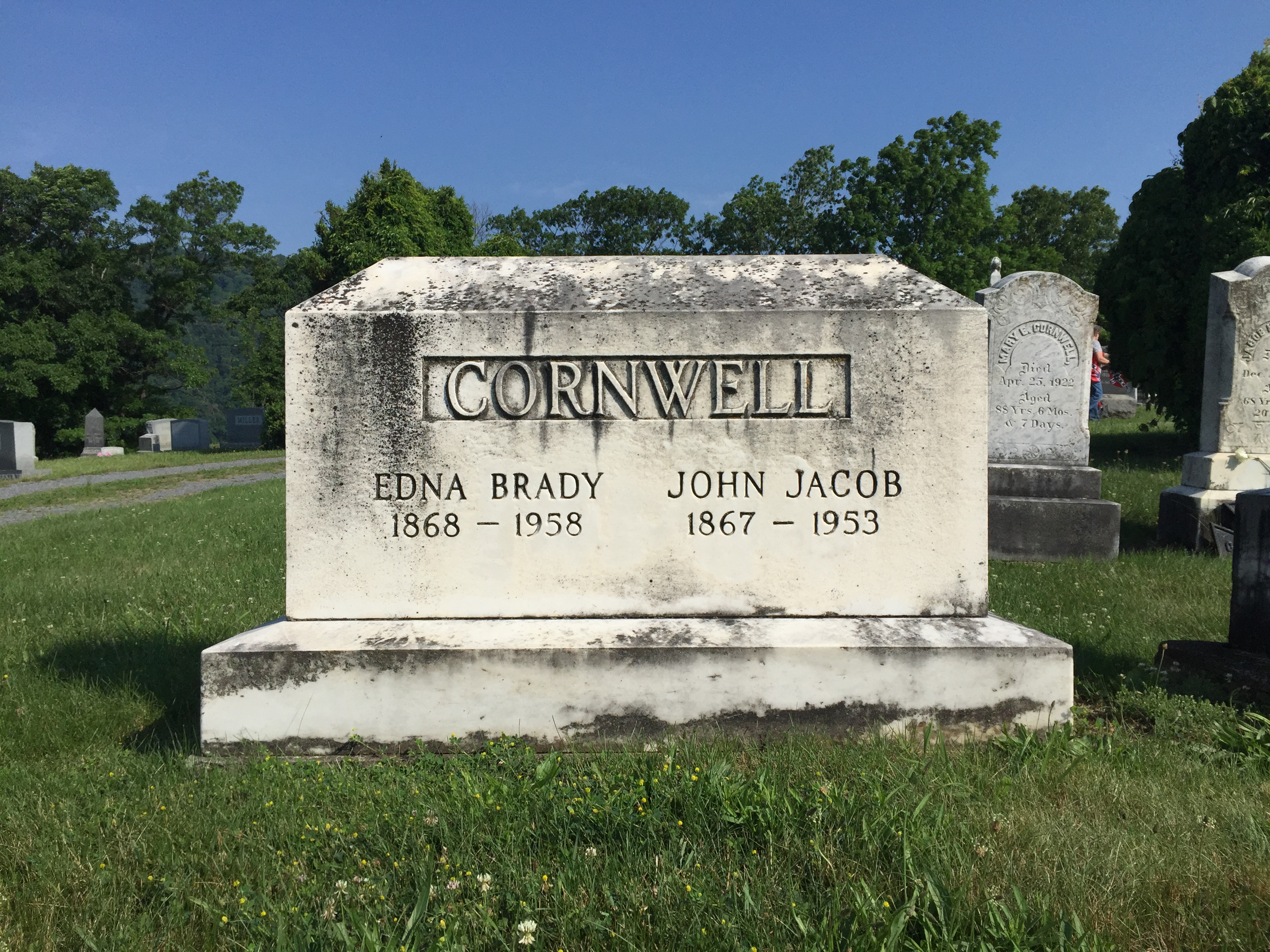
Grave of Governor John J. Cornwell and his wife Edna Brady Cornwell

- Stephen Ailes (1912–2001), United States Secretary of the Army
- James Dillon Armstrong (1821–1893), Virginia state senator and West Virginia circuit court judge
- William Armstrong (1782–1865), United States House Representative
- John Rinehart Blue (1905–1965), West Virginia House Delegate and School for the Deaf principal at the West Virginia Schools for the Deaf and the Blind (WVSDB)
- William C. Clayton (1831–1915), West Virginia state senator
- Edna Brady Cornwell (1868–1958), First Lady of West Virginia
- John J. Cornwell (1867–1953), 15th Governor of West Virginia
- Marshall S. Cornwell (1871–1898), newspaper editor and publisher, poet, and author
- William B. Cornwell (1864–1926), railroad and timber executive
- John Collins Covell (1823–1887), WVSDB principal
- Dr. William Henry Foote (1794–1869), Presbyterian clergyman and historian
- Henry Bell Gilkeson (1850–1921), West Virginia state senator, West Virginia house delegate, WVSDB principal, and Hampshire County Schools superintendent
- John Jeremiah Jacob (1757–1839), first ordained Methodist minister in Hampshire County
- John J. Jacob (1829–1893), 4th Governor of West Virginia
- Howard Hille Johnson (1846–1913), WVSDB founder and educator
- James Sloan Kuykendall (1878–1928), West Virginia House Delegate
- George Preston Marshall (1896–1969), owner and president of the Washington Redskins
- Gilbert Proctor Miller (1866–1927), orchardist; founder of Hampshire County's fruit industry
- Alexander W. Monroe (1817–1905), Speaker of the West Virginia House of Delegates and Confederate States Army officer
- George William Washington (1809–1876), gentleman farmer and diarist
- Christian Streit White (1839–1917), Clerk of Court for Hampshire County
- John Baker White (1868–1944), Military officer and West Virginia Board of Control member
- Robert White (1876–1935), Prosecuting Attorney for Hampshire County and West Virginia State Senator
- Joshua Soule Zimmerman (1874–1962), West Virginia House Delegate, Hampshire County Prosecuting Attorney, and orchardist

== Image gallery ==
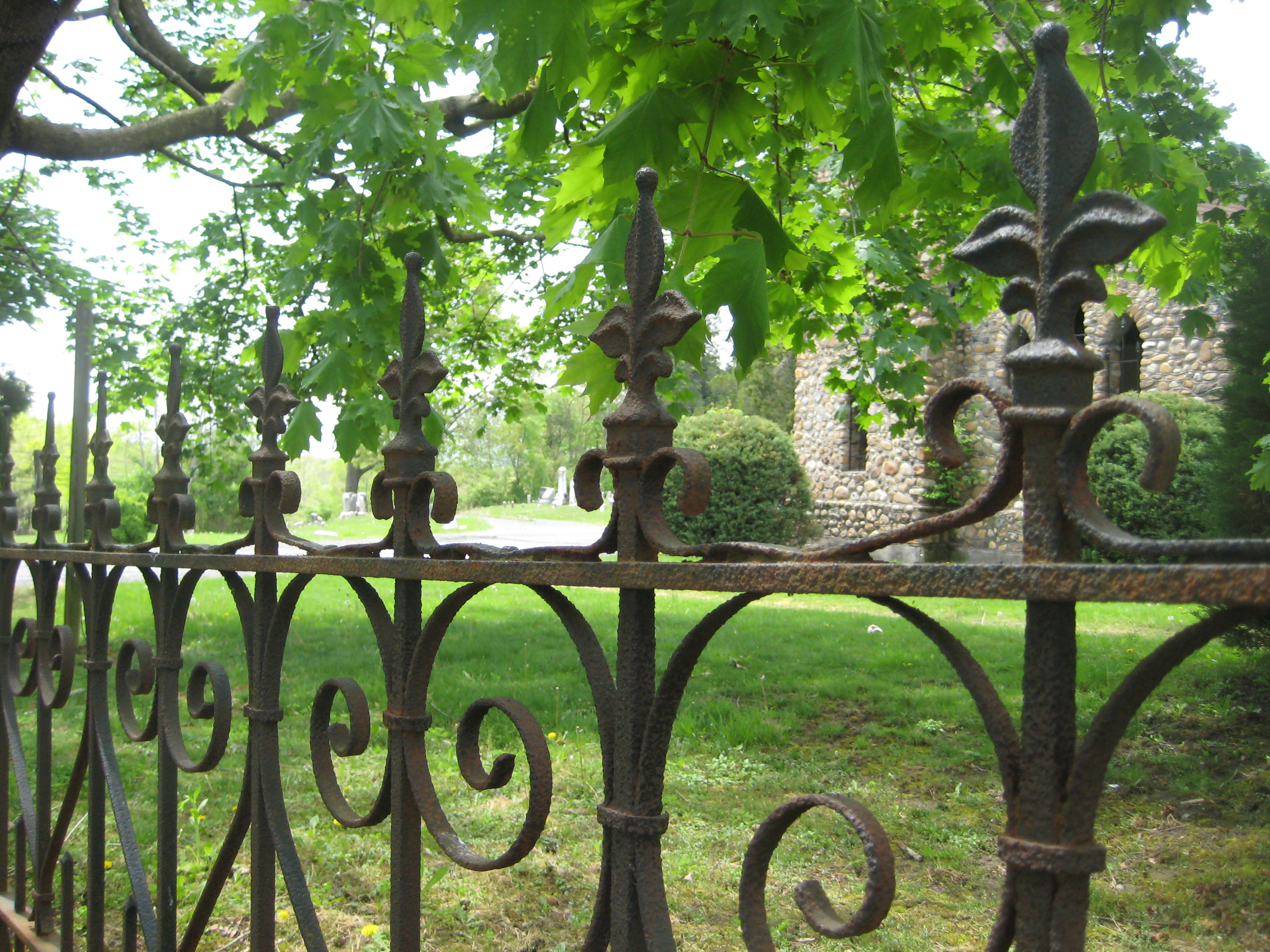
Iron fence at the entrance

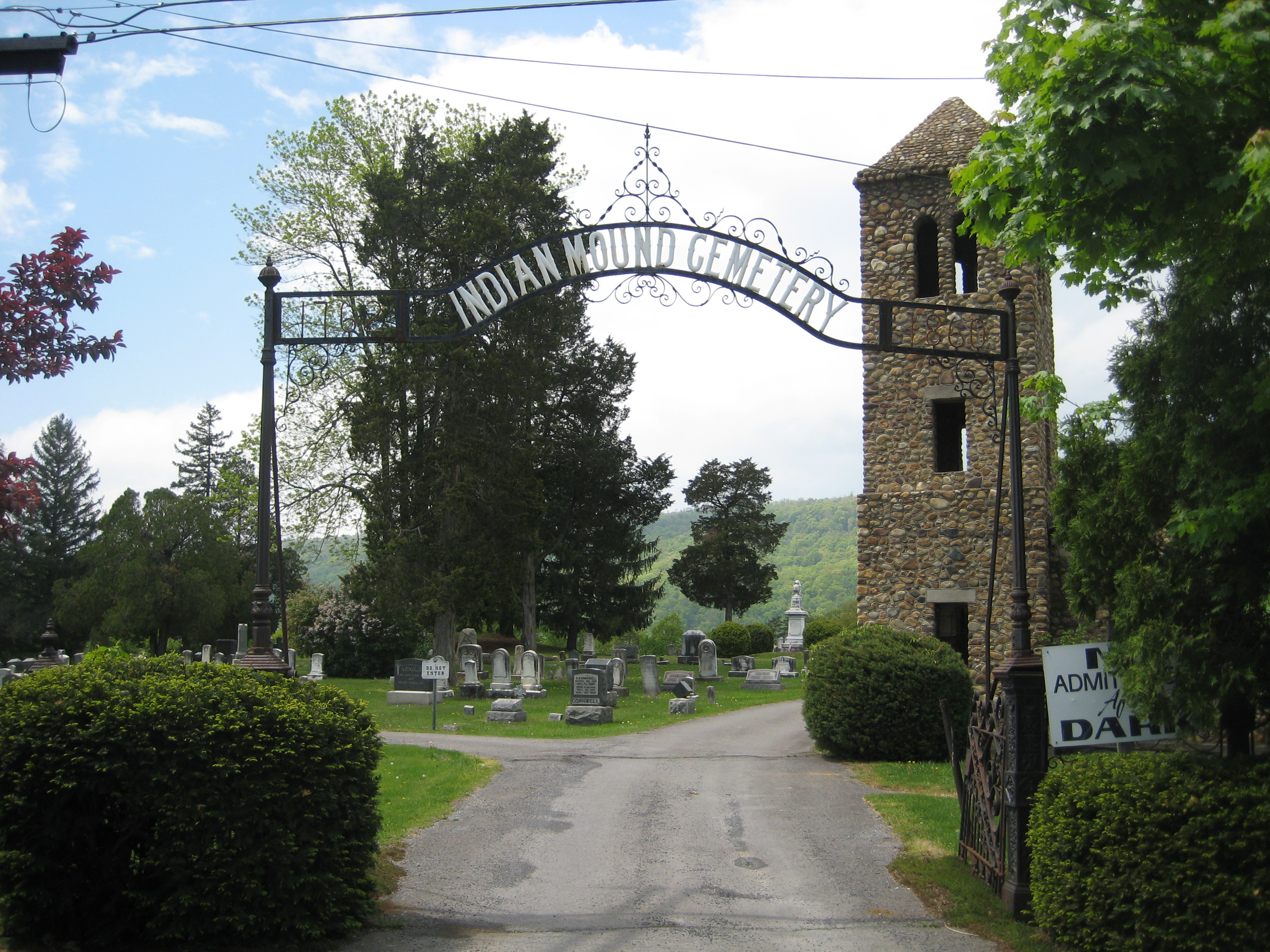
Entrance gate and Parsons Bell Tower

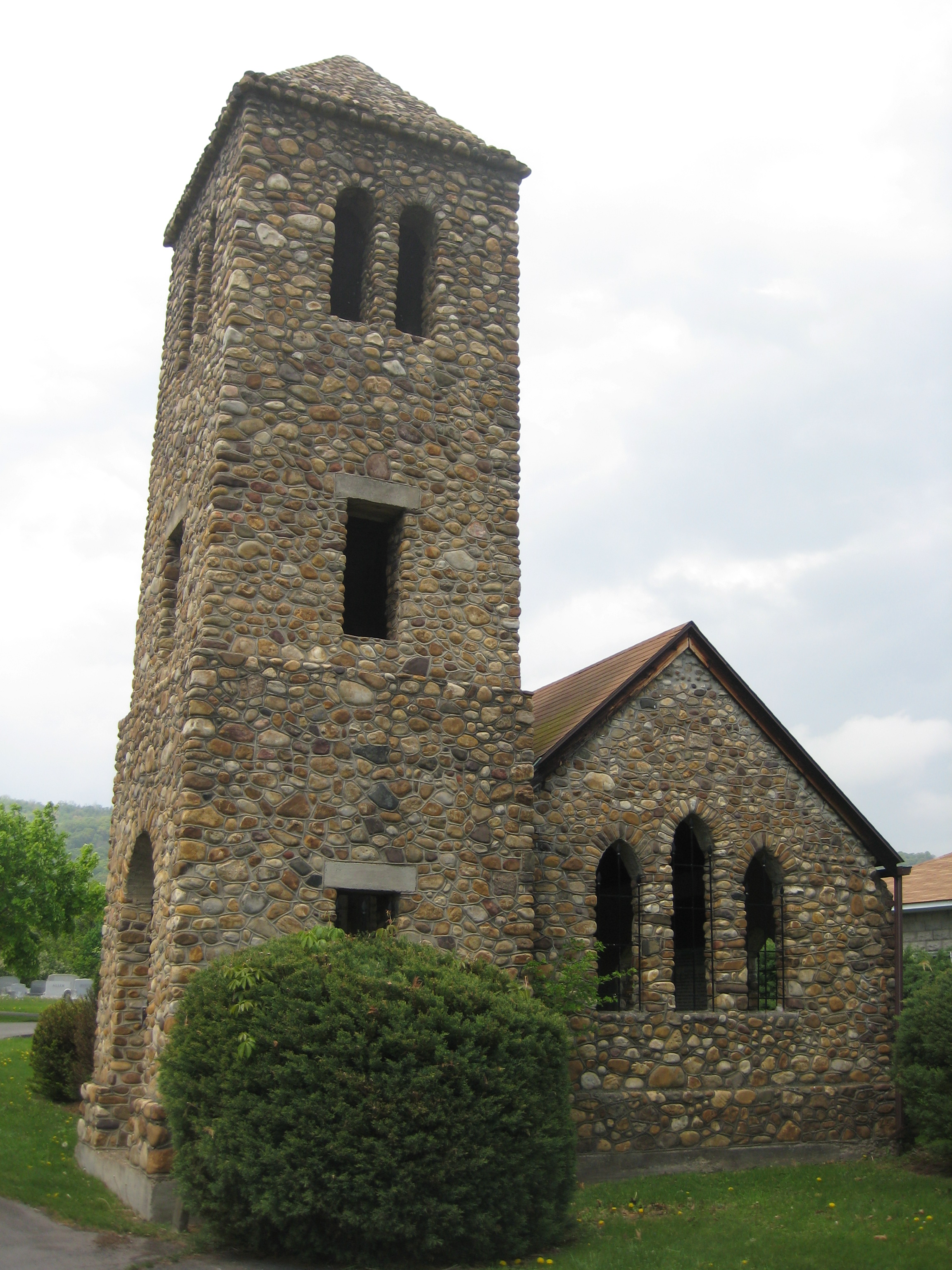
Parsons Bell Tower

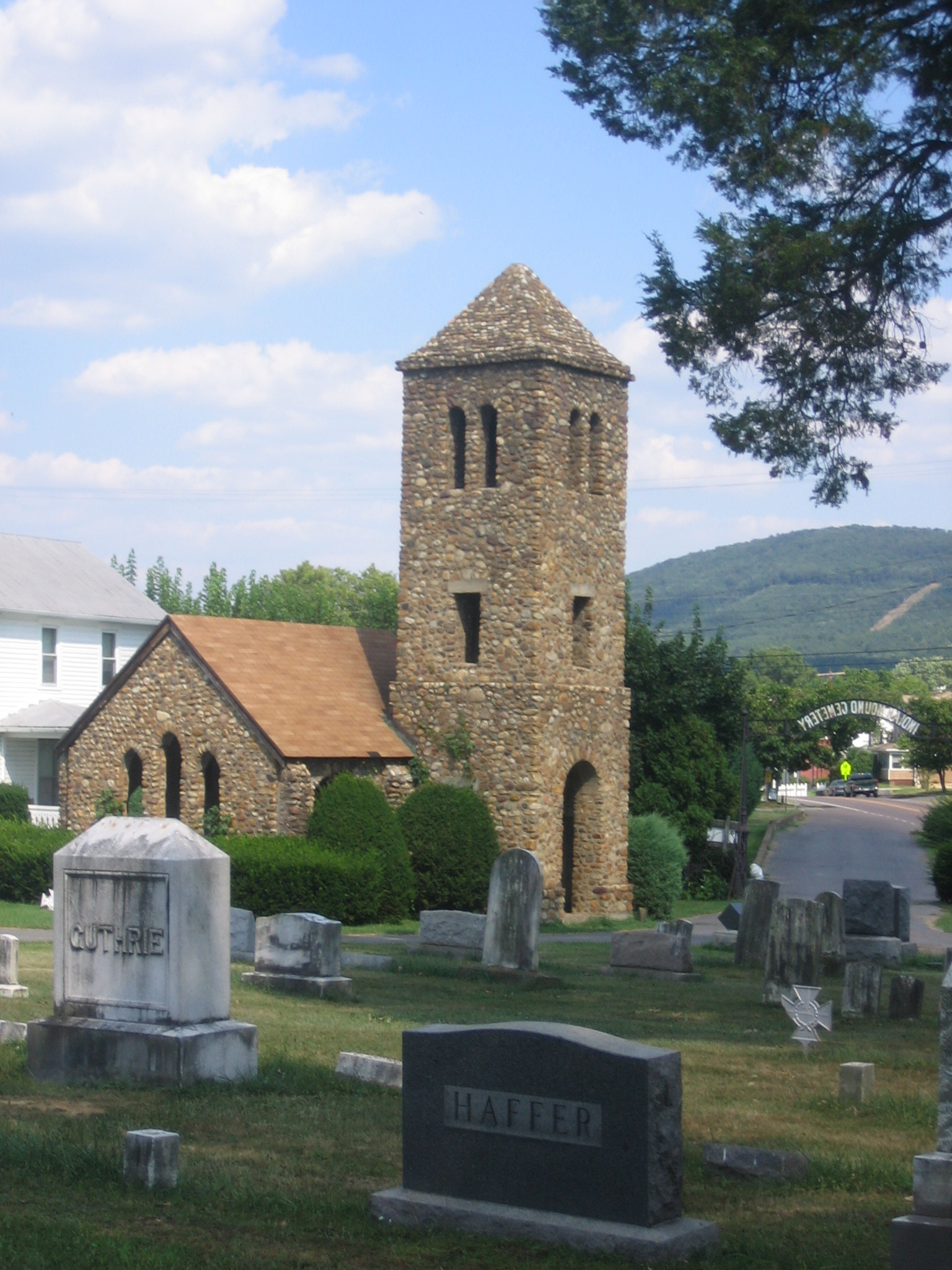
Parsons Bell Tower

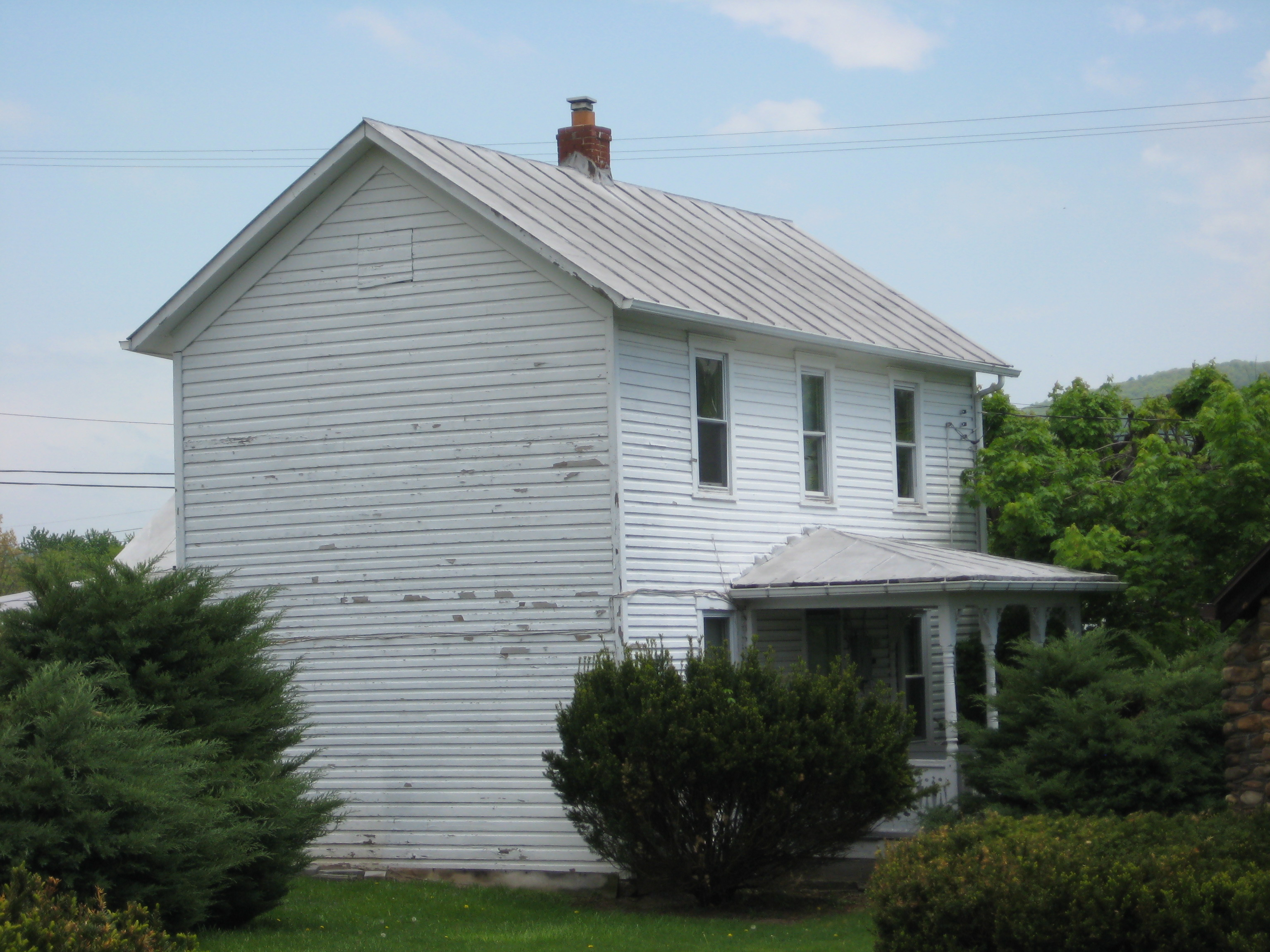
Caretaker's residence

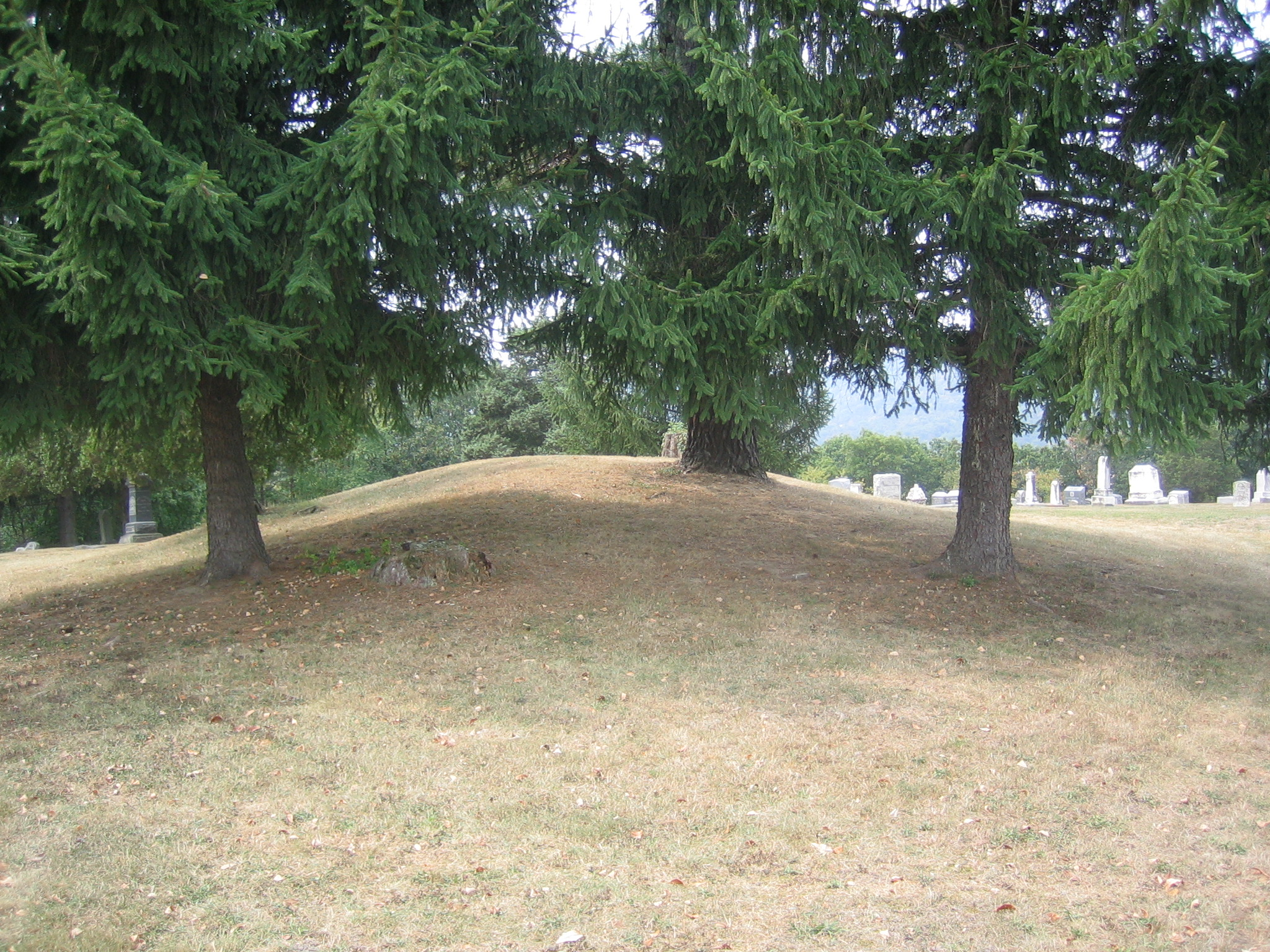
Romney Indian Mound

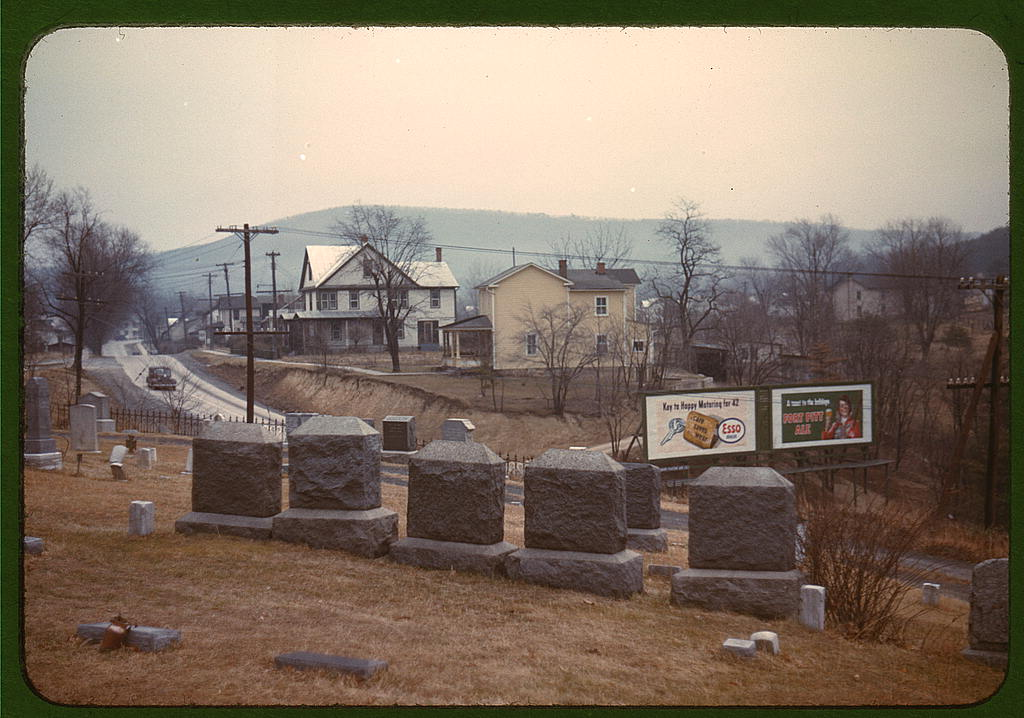
Indian Mound Cemetery and U.S. Route 50 in 1942

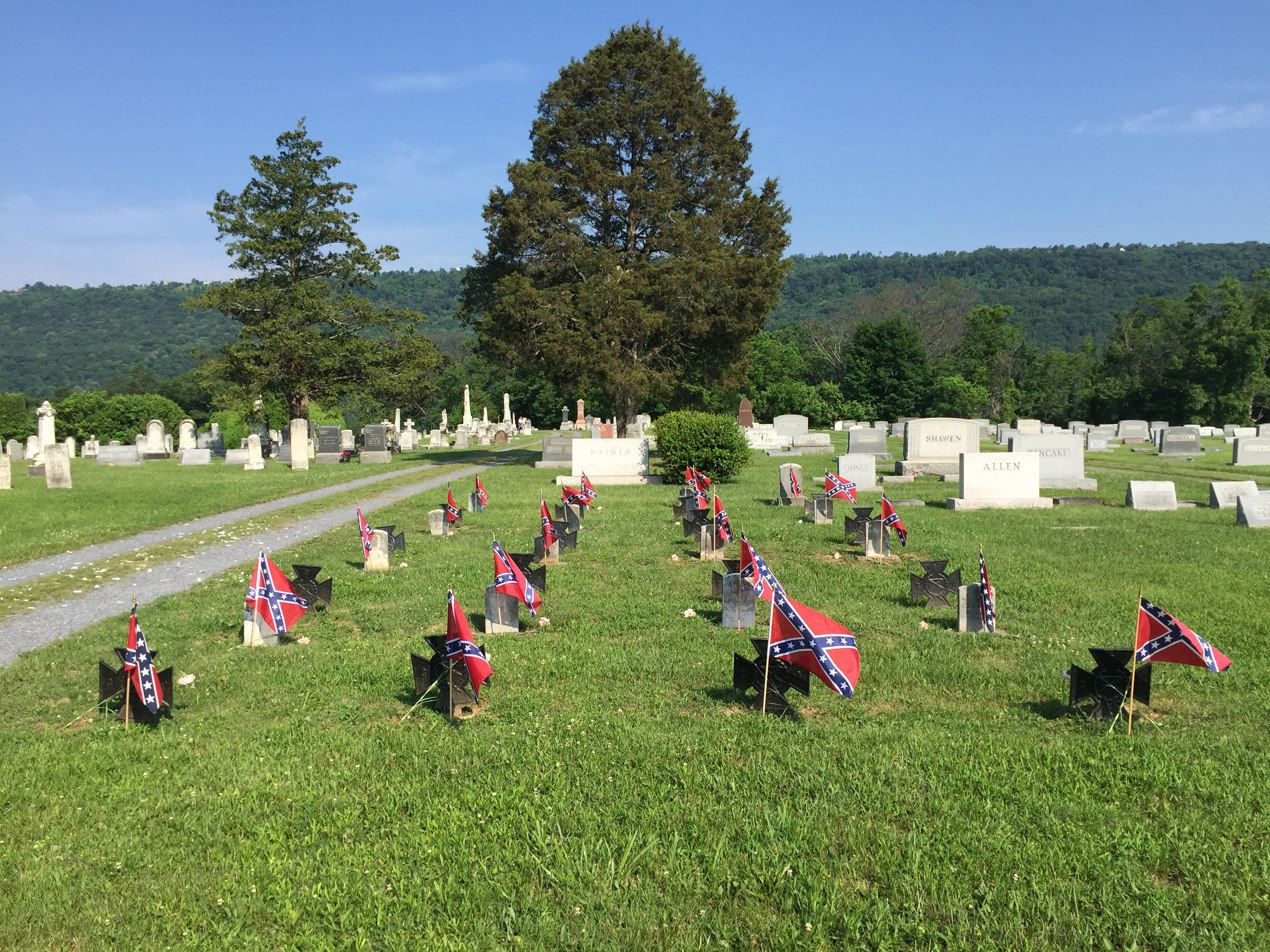
Unknown Confederate graves, decorated for Confederate Memorial Day

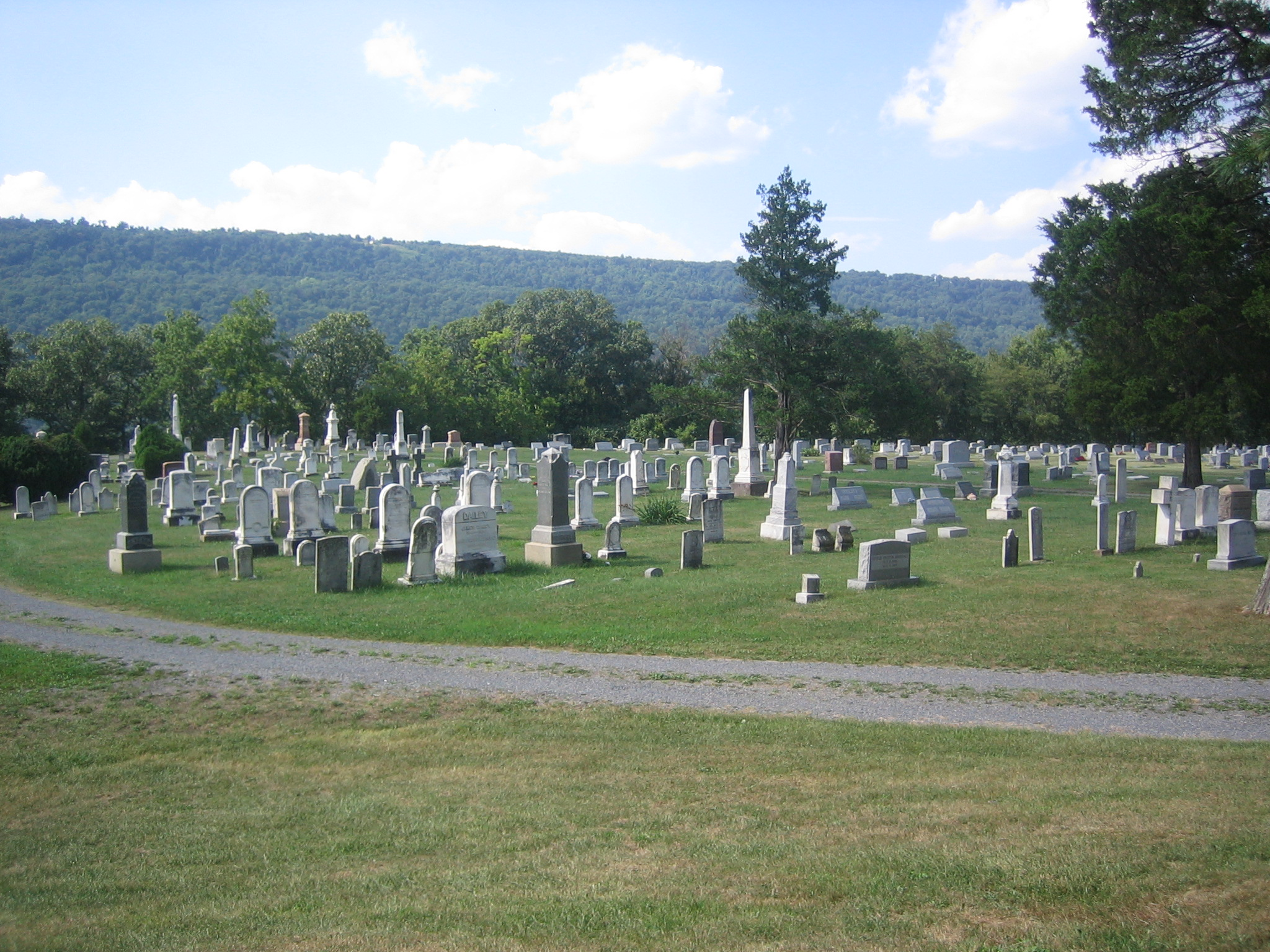
Gravestones at Indian Mound Cemetery

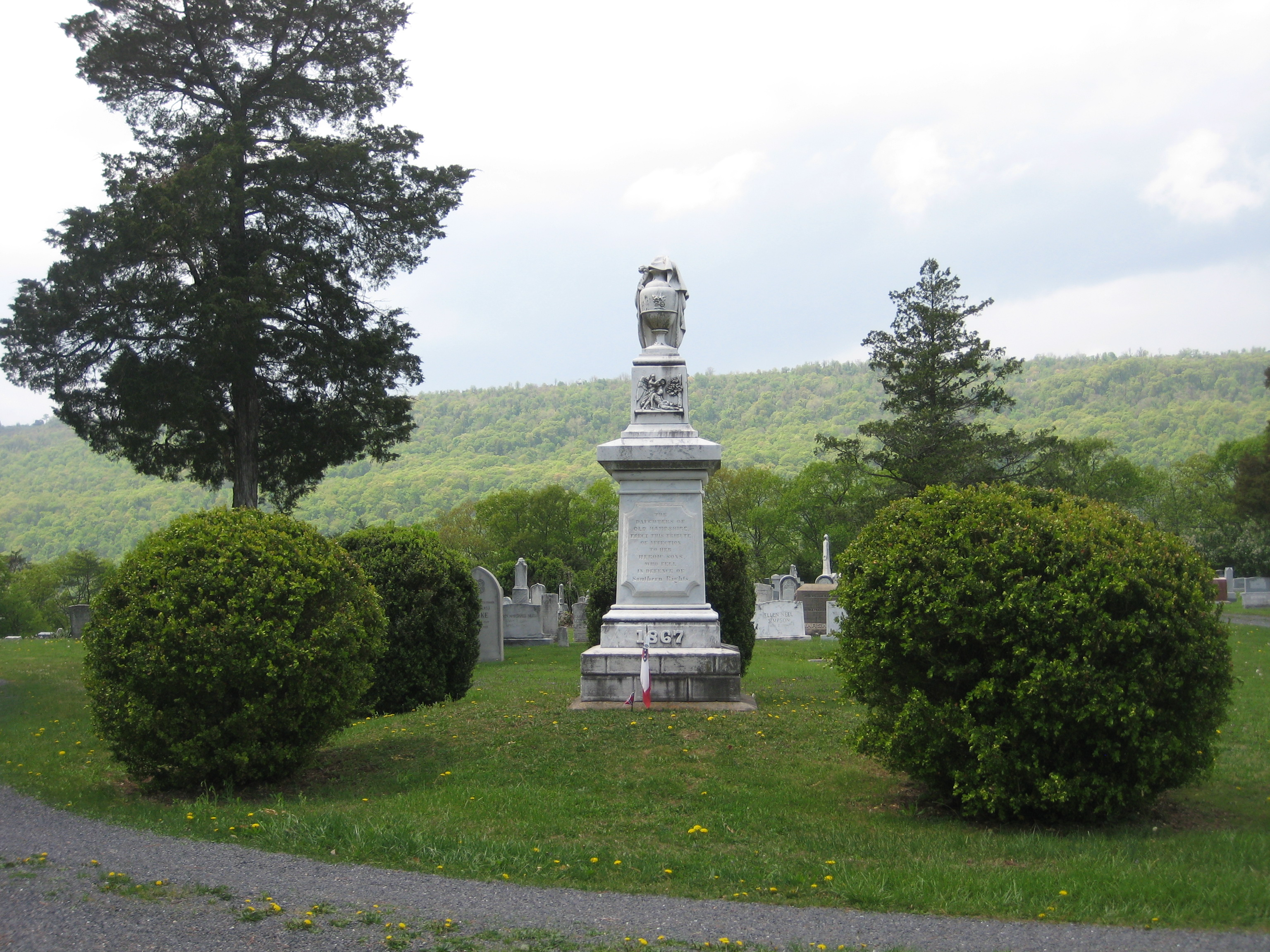
Confederate Memorial

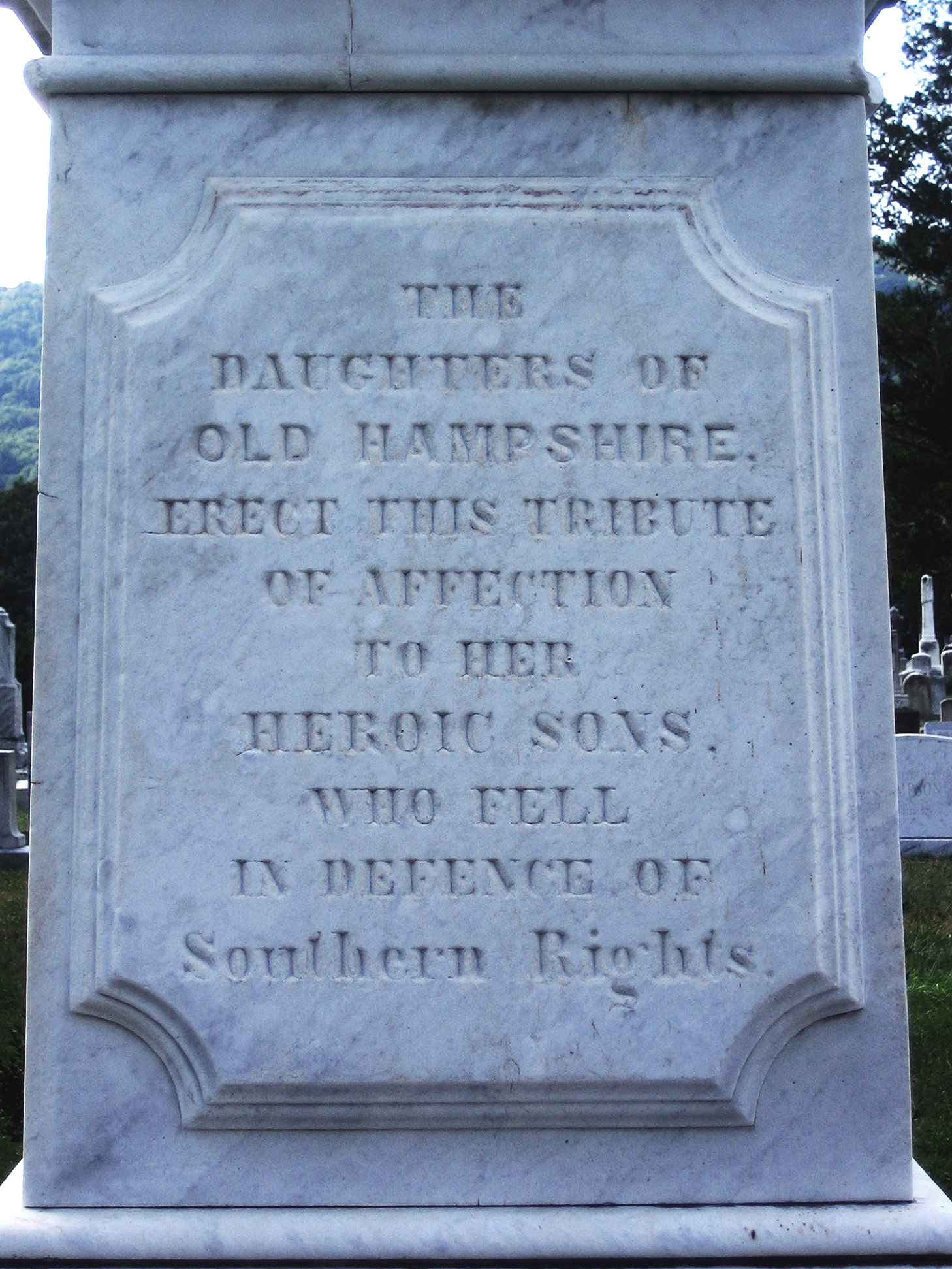
Confederate Memorial detail

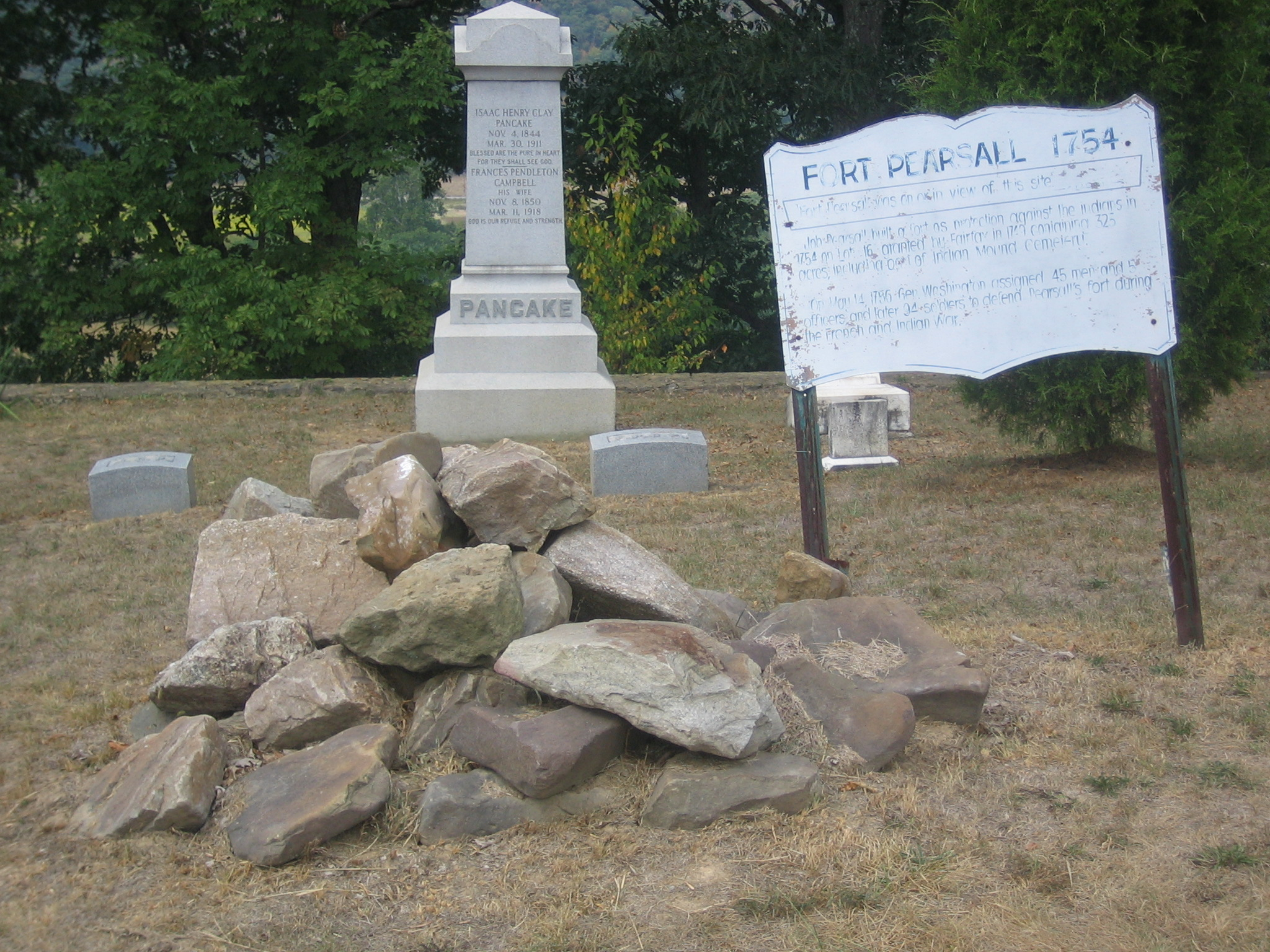
Old Fort Pearsall historical marker

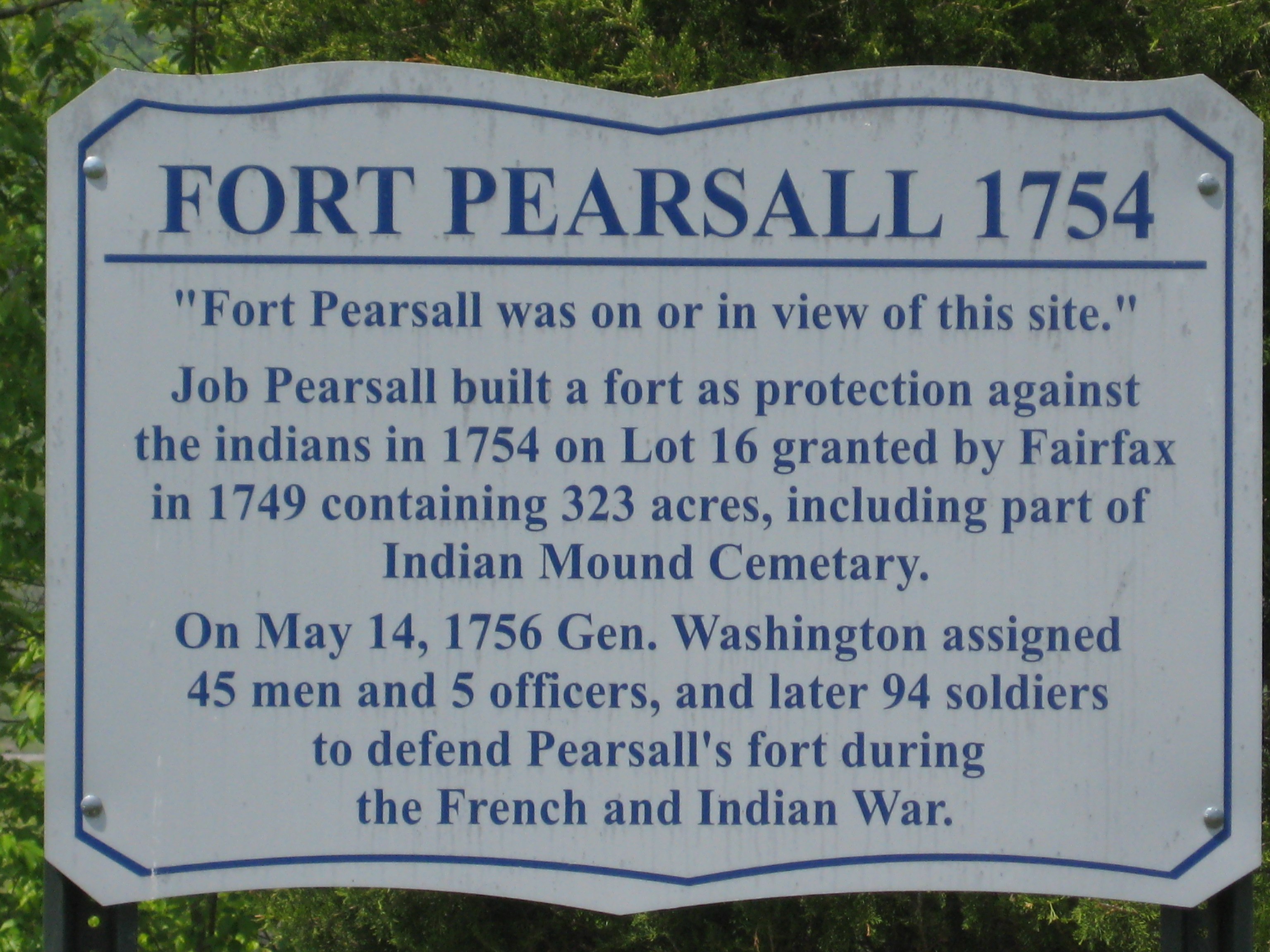
New Fort Pearsall historical marker

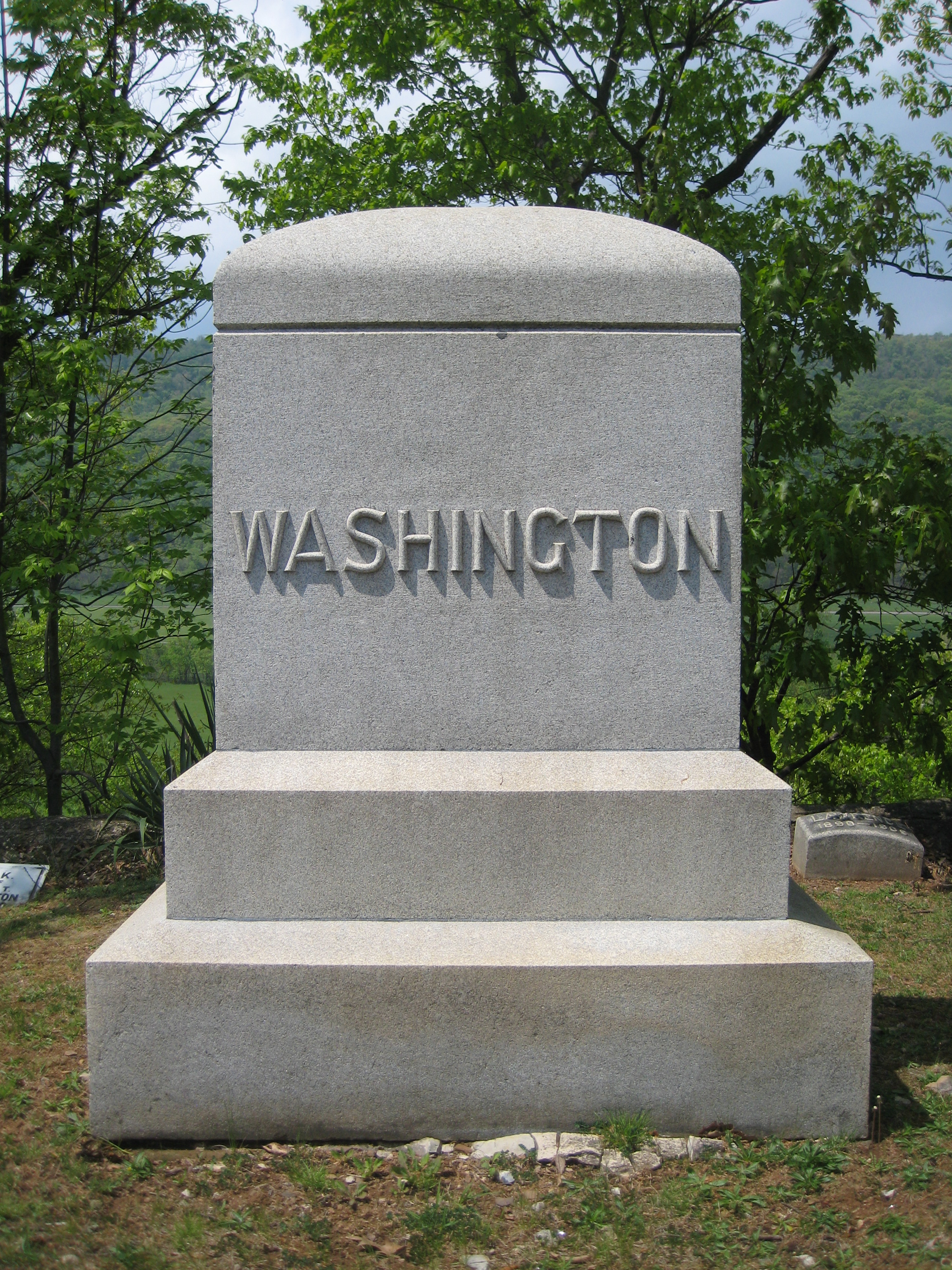
Washington family plot

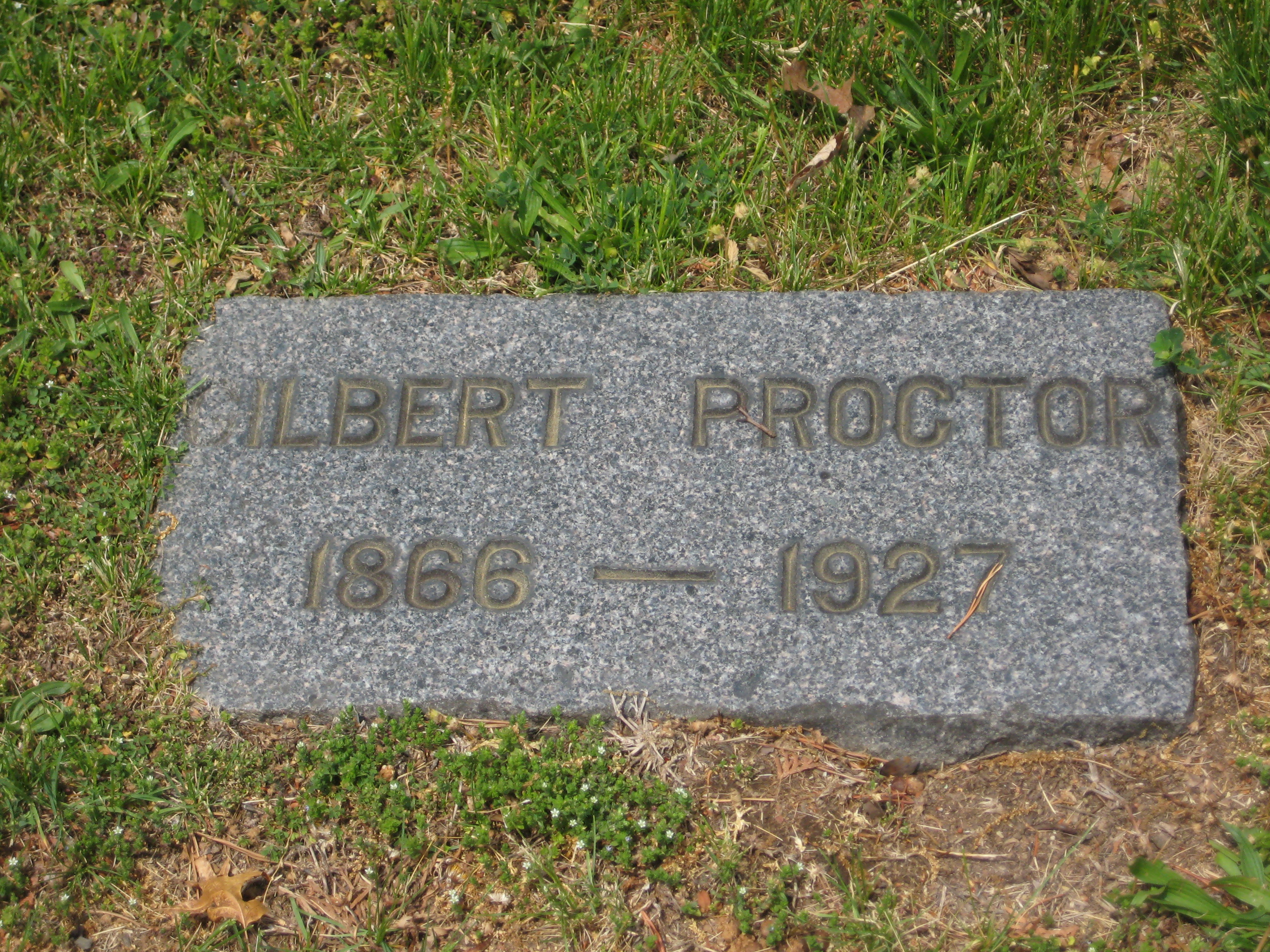
Grave of Gilbert Proctor Miller, founder of Hampshire County's fruit industry

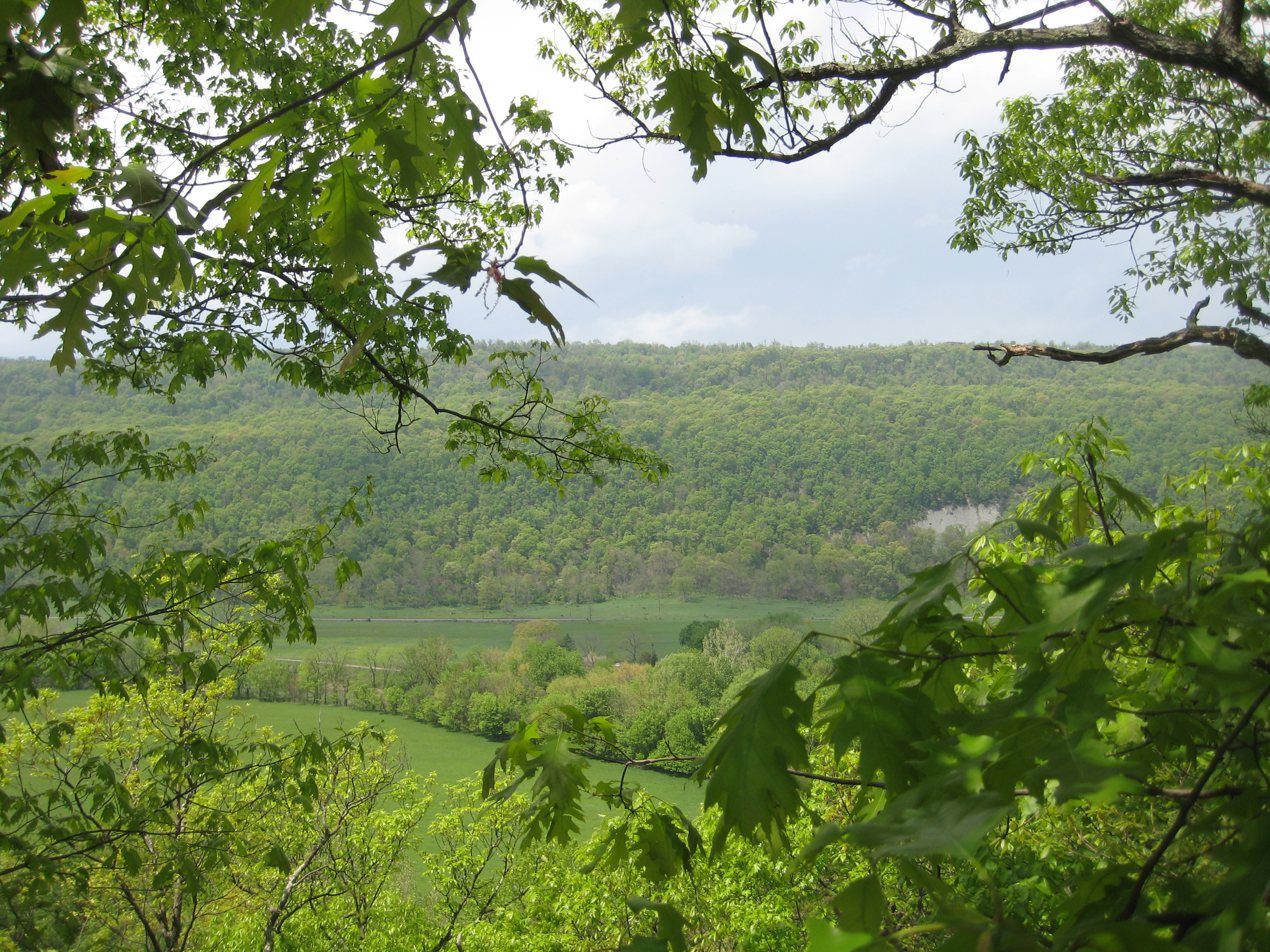
View of Mill Creek Mountain and the South Branch Potomac River

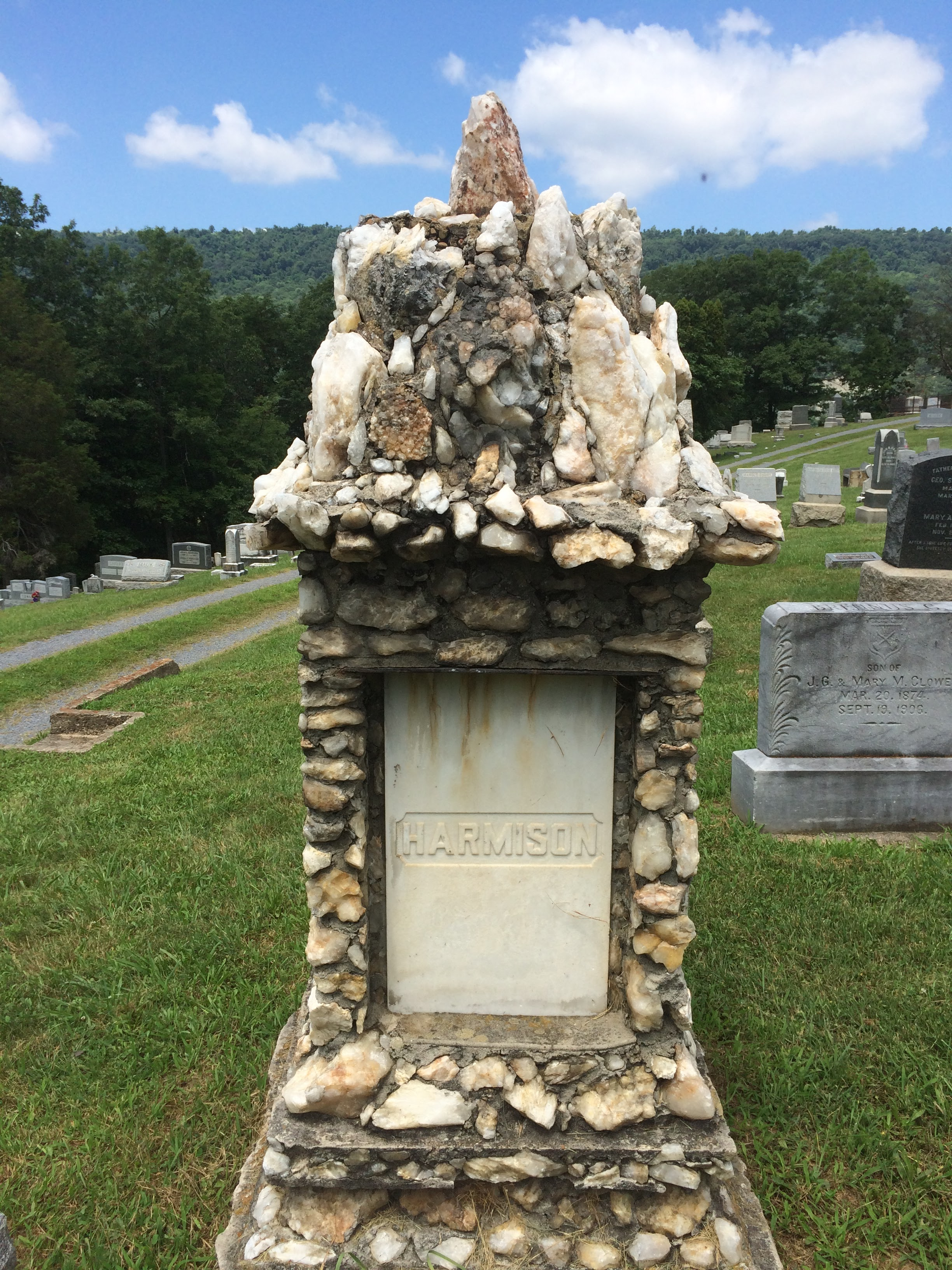
Harmison family marker

== See also ==
- List of historic sites in Hampshire County, West Virginia
- List of Hopewell sites
- Mount Pisgah Benevolence Cemetery
