= Mount Pisgah Benevolence Cemetery =

African American cemetery in Hampshire County, West Virginia, US

Details
- Established: 19th century
- Location: Northwestern Turnpike (U.S. Route 50); Town Hill; Romney, West Virginia
- Country: United States
- Coordinates: 39°20′31″N 78°46′02″W
- Type: Private
- Find a Grave: Mount Pisgah Benevolence Cemetery

Mount Pisgah Benevolence Cemetery is an African-American cemetery in Romney, West Virginia, United States. The cemetery is located along the Northwestern Turnpike (U.S. Route 50) below Indian Mound Cemetery overlooking Sulphur Spring Run. Historically known as the Romney Colored Cemetery and more recently as the Romney African-American Cemetery, the cemetery was created for African-Americans in the South Branch Valley who were not permitted to be interred in the city's Indian Mound Cemetery. The cemetery has been in use since the early 19th century and continues to serve Romney's African-American community.

The cemetery is the final resting place of Alfred Whiting Sr. A marker on his grave claims that he served in the Confederate States Army, although Historic Hampshire website notes his obituary states that he was a body servant, and no evidence exists to suggest that he had any formal position in the CSA.

The cemetery is currently maintained by the Mount Pisgah United Methodist Church, from which it takes its name. The town council of Romney has reportedly sought to secure the deed of the cemetery, as of November 2023.

== See also ==
- List of historic sites in Hampshire County, West Virginia
- Indian Mound Cemetery
