= Joseph A. Waddell =

American politician

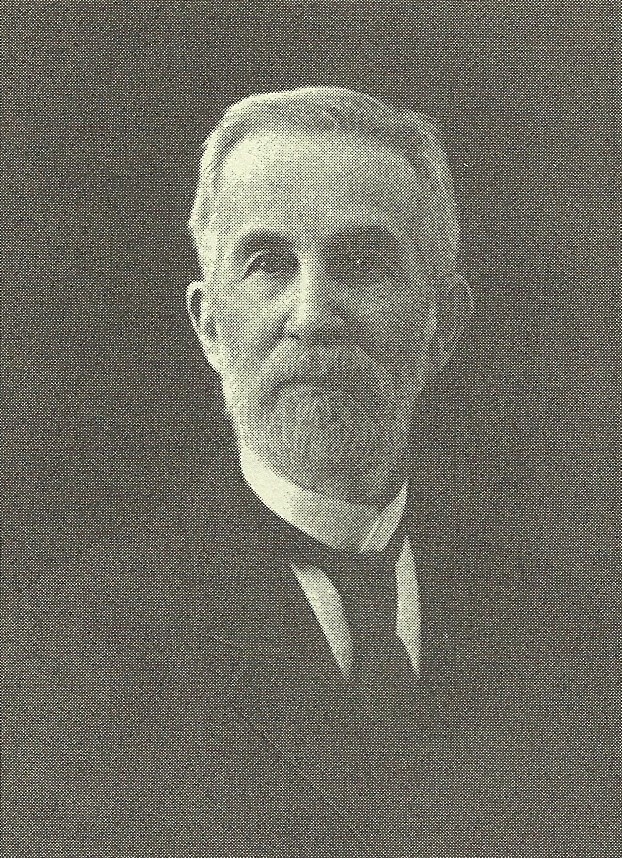

President pro tempore of the Senate of Virginia
- In office 1870–1871
- Preceded by: James F. Johnson
- Succeeded by: Henry Wirtz Thomas

Member of the Virginia Senate from the Augusta and Highland Counties district
- In office October 5, 1869 – December 5, 1871
- Preceded by: Nicholas K. Trout
- Succeeded by: Alexander B. Cochran

Member of the Virginia House of Delegates from the Augusta district
- In office December 4, 1865 – October 4, 1869 Serving with John B. Baldwin; George Baylor
- Preceded by: Bolivar Christian
- Succeeded by: Alexander B. Cochran

Personal details
- Born: March 19, 1823 Staunton, Virginia, U.S.
- Died: February 17, 1914 (aged 90) Staunton, Virginia, U.S.
- Party: Whig; Democrat
- Spouse(s): Virginia McClung; Laleah Dunwody
- Education: University of Virginia
- Profession: Lawyer, journalist, politician

Joseph Addison Waddell (March 19, 1823 – February 17, 1914) was an American lawyer, politician, newspaperman and author from Virginia. He served in the Virginia Constitutional Convention of 1868, representing Augusta County, Virginia, and also briefly represented that county's voters in both houses of the Virginia General Assembly. Waddell served as president pro tem of the Virginia Senate in 1870–71.

== Early and family life ==
Joseph Addison Waddell (who at times as a youth went by his middle name) was born to the former Catherine Ann Boys, wife of Dr. Addison Waddell, in Staunton, Virginia on March 19, 1823. His grandfather, Rev. James Waddell, had been known as the "blind preacher." His paternal great grandparents had emigrated to Pennsylvania from County Down in Ireland. His maternal grandfather, Capt. Nathan Boys, had served in Pennsylvania's navy in 1775, become Philadelphia's city commissioner (1793–97), and also represented the city in the Pennsylvania General Assembly. He had an elder brother, Dr. James Alexander Waddell (1818-1883; a physician and Presbyterian minister), as well as a younger brother, printer Lee Waddell (1832-1893), and younger sister, Catharine St. Clair Waddell Tate (1828-1914). Although his father had a medical degree from the University of Pennsylvania, Joseph Waddell was educated in Virginia: first at the Staunton Academy, then briefly at Washington College (which later became Washington and Lee University). He then moved to Charlottesville to study at the University of Virginia, then completed his legal studies back in Staunton at a private law school conducted by Judge Lucas P. Thompson.

In 1820, his father owned 8 slaves. By 1840, his father owned 18 slaves, and a decade later owned five slaves. In 1860, Joseph A. Waddell appears to own five slaves in Augusta County.

In 1842, Joseph Waddell married Virginia McClung (1822-1889), but they had no children. A year after her death, in 1890, he married Laleah Dunwody (1844-1919), who survived him.

== Career ==
After admission to the Virginia bar, Waddell had a private legal practice in his native Augusta County, but was drawn to journalism. He became co-editor and co-proprietor of the Staunton Spectator for twelve years. Originally a Whig, Waddell later became a Democrat.

In 1860, Waddell was appointed a commissioner in chancery, under the guidance of his mentor Judge Thompson, who presided over the circuit court for three decades, including during the American Civil War. Waddell would remain a commissioner in chancery for the rest of his legal career. He also served as the county's commissioner of accounts, and clerk of the Virginia Court of Appeals when it sat in Staunton.

In 1865, Augusta county voters elected Waddell to represent them, part-time in the Virginia House of Delegates. In 1867 they elected him as a Conservative to represent them at the Virginia Constitutional Convention of 1868. In the following election, he ran for the Virginia Senate, where he represented Augusta and neighboring Highland County until the district was redistricted to include only Augusta County following the census of 1870. Alexander B. Cochran, who succeeded to Waddell's former House of Delegates seat when Waddell ran for the Senate in 1869, then succeeded Waddell in the Virginia Senate in 1871. Waddell, a member of the Virginia Historical Society, wrote Home Scenes and Family Sketches (1864), Annals of Augusta County (1901 and 1902), and The Scotch-Irish of the Valley of Virginia (1895). He also served as president of the board of visitors of the Virginia School for the Deaf and Blind, and what was then known as the Western Lunatic Asylum (later as Western State Hospital).

Waddell died in 1914.
