= WVSB =

WVSB may refer to:

- WVSB (FM), a radio station (106.3 FM) licensed to serve South Bend, Indiana, United States
- WVXS, a radio station (104.1 FM) licensed to serve Romney, West Virginia, which held the call sign WVSB from 2000 to 2018
- WLOV-TV, a television station (channel 27) licensed to serve West Point, Mississippi, which held the call sign WVSB-TV from 1983 to 1991
