= Edgar Snowden Jr. =

American newspaper editor and state legislator

Edgar Snowden Jr. was an American 19th-century newspaper editor and state legislator in Virginia. He served in the Virginia Senate representing Alexandria, Fairfax and Loudoun Counties along with Thomas E. Taylor.

He worked at his father Edgar's Alexandria Gazette newspaper. He was an organizing officer of the Manassas Gap Railroad. He served as an assistant postmaster.

The Union Army used him and others as human shields on rail lines. His paper was pressured by Union authorities not to recognize the legislature in Richmond. Snowden was succeeded in the legislature by Henry Wirtz Thomas.

He was involved with the Alexandria Library Company. Carrol H. Quenzel wrote a biographical sketch about him.
