= West Virginia Schools for the Deaf and the Blind =

Public school in Romney, West Virginia, US

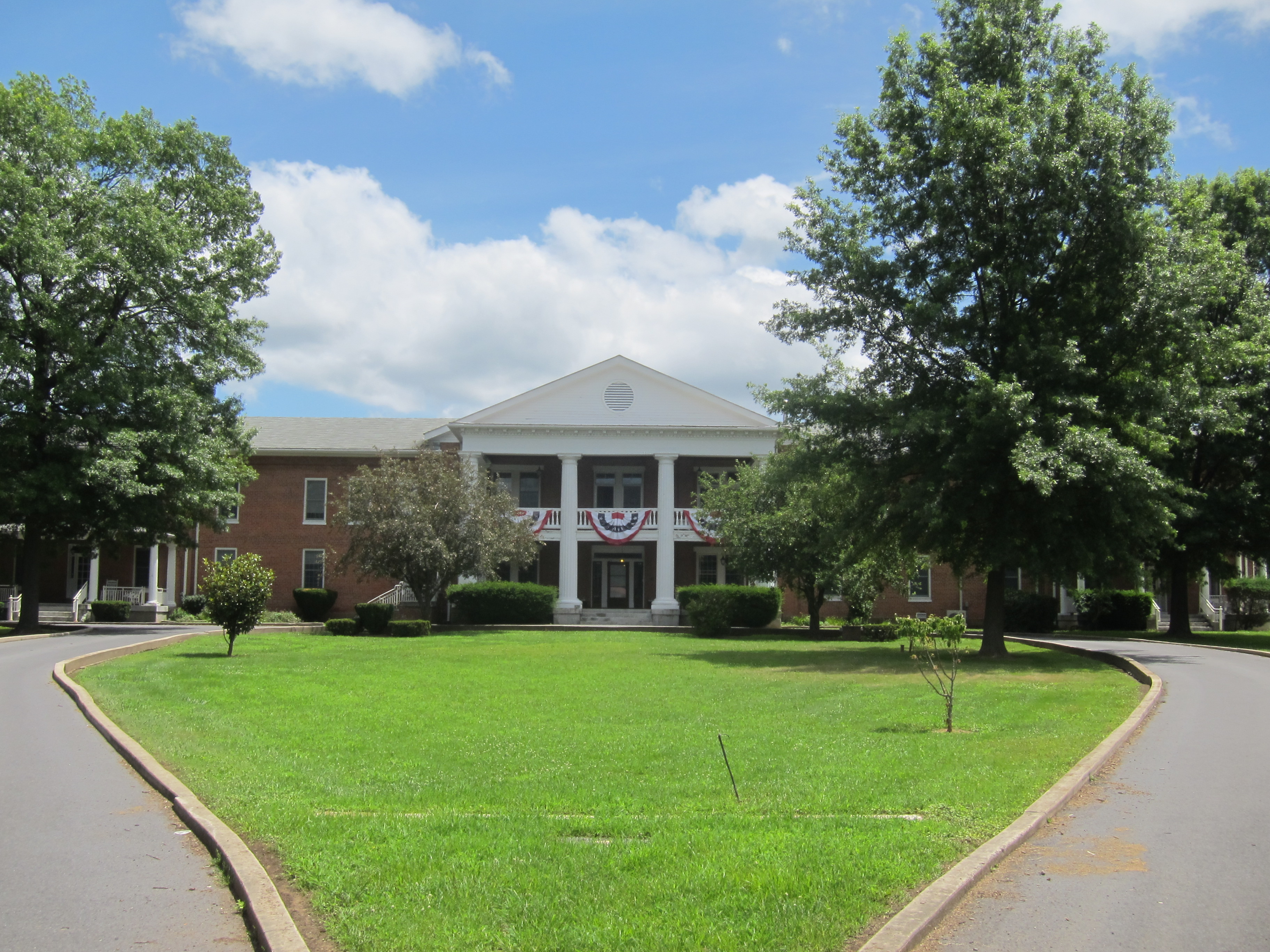
- The schools' administration building, 2013

Location
- 301 East Main Street; Romney, West Virginia 26757; United States; 39°20′26″N 78°45′07″W

Information
- Type: Public school
- Motto: Vision: Achieve. Challenge. Thrive.
- Established: March 3, 1870
- School board: West Virginia Board of Education
- State Superintendent: W. Clayton Burch
- Schools' Superintendent: Patricia Homberg
- Dean of Students: Melanie Hesse
- Website: www.wvsdb2.state.k12.wv.us

The West Virginia Schools for the Deaf and the Blind (WVSDB) were established by an Act of the Legislature on March 3, 1870. The School for the Deaf and the School for the Blind offer comprehensive educational programs for hearing impaired and visually impaired students respectively. There is also a unit for deafblind and multihandicapped children. Students are eligible to enroll at the age of three, must be residents of the state of West Virginia and exhibit a hearing or visual loss sufficient to prevent normal progress in the usual public school setting. The West Virginia Schools for the Deaf and Blind are located on a campus in Romney in West Virginia's Eastern Panhandle. Locally, the schools are referred to simply as The state school.

Both the School for the Deaf and the School for the Blind are supervised by the West Virginia Board of Education, supported by the state of West Virginia, and fully accredited by the North Central Association of Colleges and Schools at the elementary and secondary levels.

== History ==
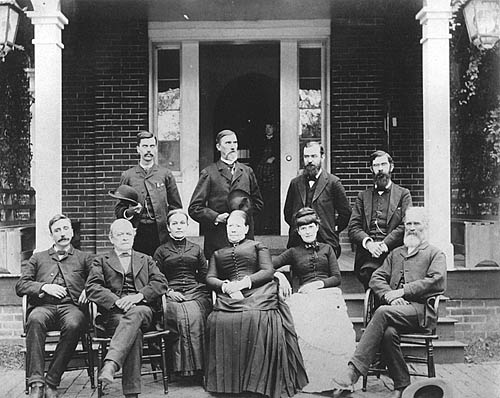
Faculty and staff at the West Virginia Schools for the Deaf and Blind in 1884. Standing left to right: Mr. Shaeffer, Principal John Collins Covell, Abraham D. Hays, and math professor E. L. Chapin; Seated left to right: school founder Howard Hille Johnson, J. B. McGann, Lulie Kern, Martha Clelland, Sarah Caruthers, and deaf school principal H. H. Chidester.

Students from the West Virginia Schools for the Deaf and the Blind performing for Governor Earl Ray Tomblin at the West Virginia State Capitol, 2016

The idea to establish a school in West Virginia for the deaf and blind began in 1869 or early 1870. Professor Howard Hille Johnson of Franklin, himself blind, was instrumental in bringing a school for the deaf and blind to West Virginia. During his youth, Johnson had attended the Virginia School for the Deaf and the Blind in Staunton, Virginia. Shortly after West Virginia's statehood, Johnson recognized the need for such a school in the state and he began canvassing the state, gathering support for his project. Several towns including Romney, Clarksburg, and Parkersburg all lobbied to have the school located there, but Romney was selected following an offer consisting of the buildings and grounds of the Romney Literary Society's Romney Classical Institute. The Romney Classical Institute had lain dormant since the American Civil War when its libraries' volumes were destroyed and its campus was left beyond repair.

On March 3, 1870, H. H. Johnson's dreams became a reality when the West Virginia Legislature approved a measure calling for the creation of the West Virginia Institution for the Deaf and Dumb and the Blind. The school opened on September 29, 1870, with thirty students, twenty-five deaf and five blind students. Through the years, additional buildings and grounds have been added to accommodate increasing enrollment. Currently, the main campus consists of sixteen major buildings, containing approximately 302,000 square feet (28,100 m^{2}), situated on seventy-nine acres of land.

On May 17, 1916, Helen Keller visited the West Virginia Schools for the Deaf and the Blind.

The historic administration building of the West Virginia Schools for the Deaf and the Blind was destroyed by fire on the morning of February 26, 2022.

== Campus ==
The school has the Helen Keller Dormitory.

== People associated with the West Virginia Schools for the Deaf and Blind ==
- Marshall S. Cornwell, Board of Regents secretary (1897)
- John Collins Covell, principal (1874–1887)
- Samuel Lightfoot Flournoy, trustee (1874–1887)
- Henry Bell Gilkeson, trustee (1876–1887) and principal (1887–1888)
- Howard Hille Johnson, trustee (1870) and professor (1870–1913)
- Robert White, trustee

== Image gallery ==
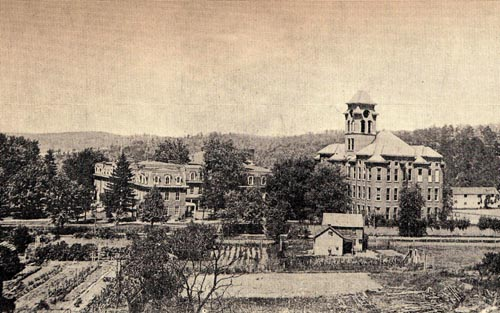

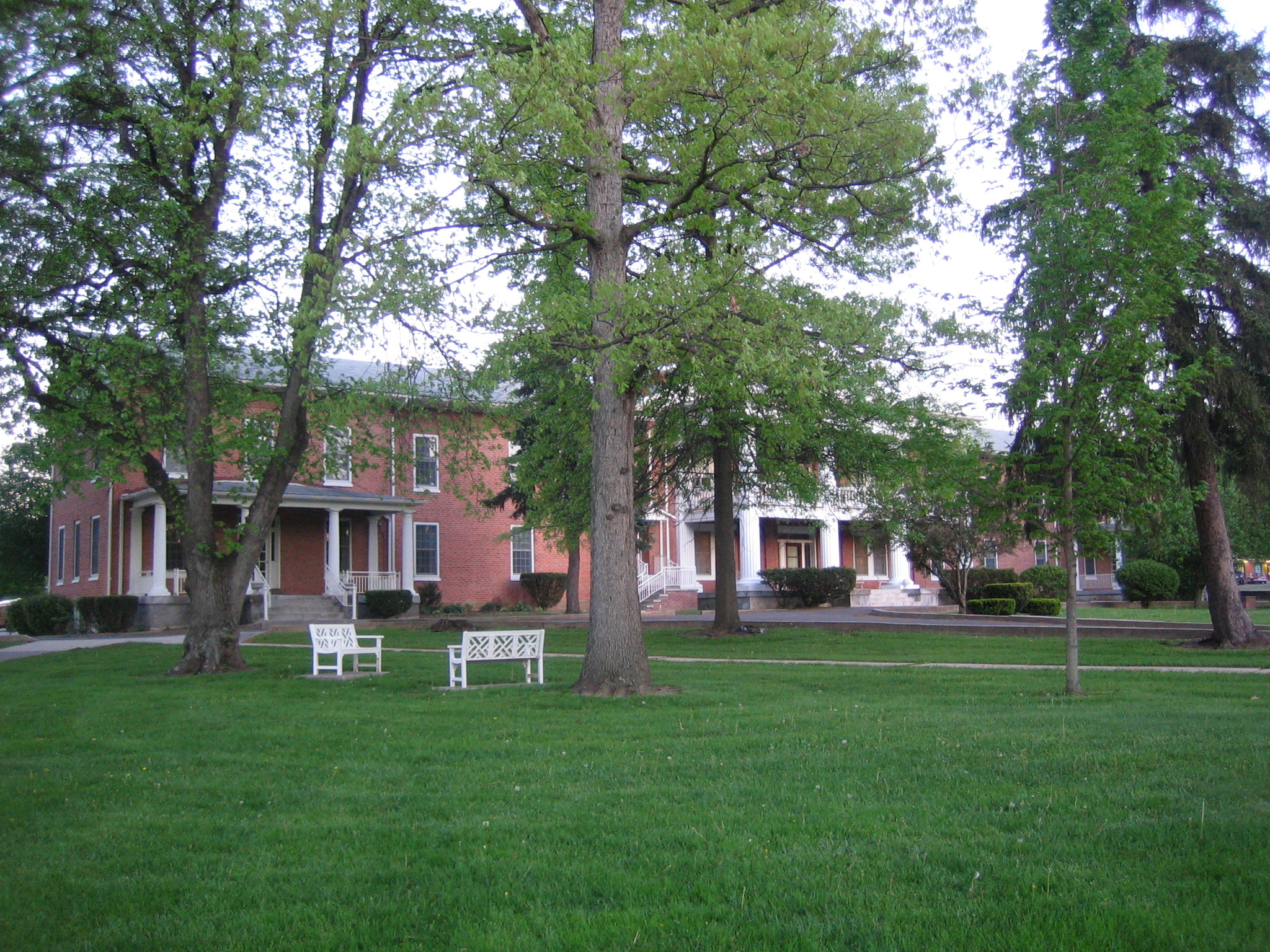

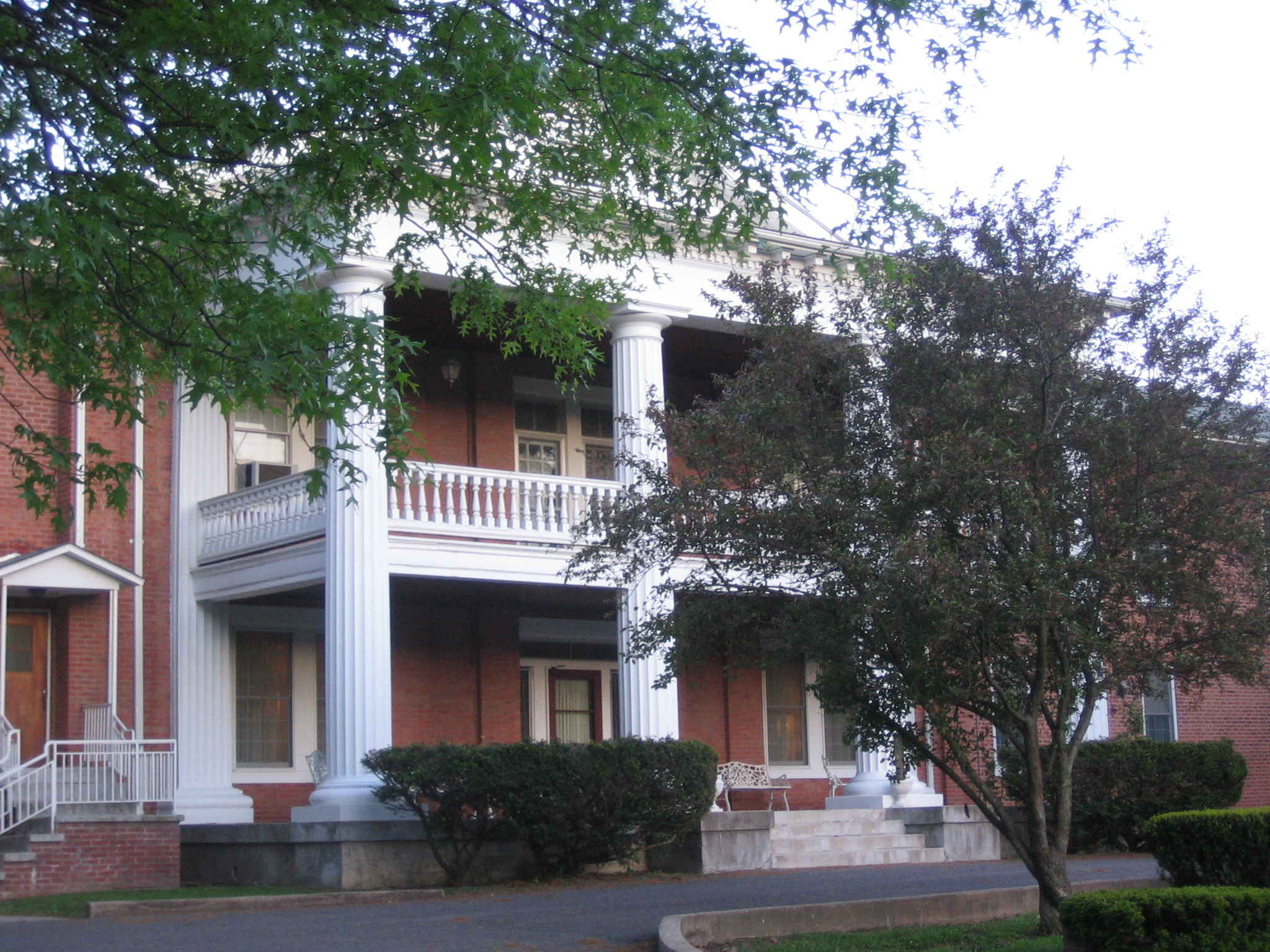

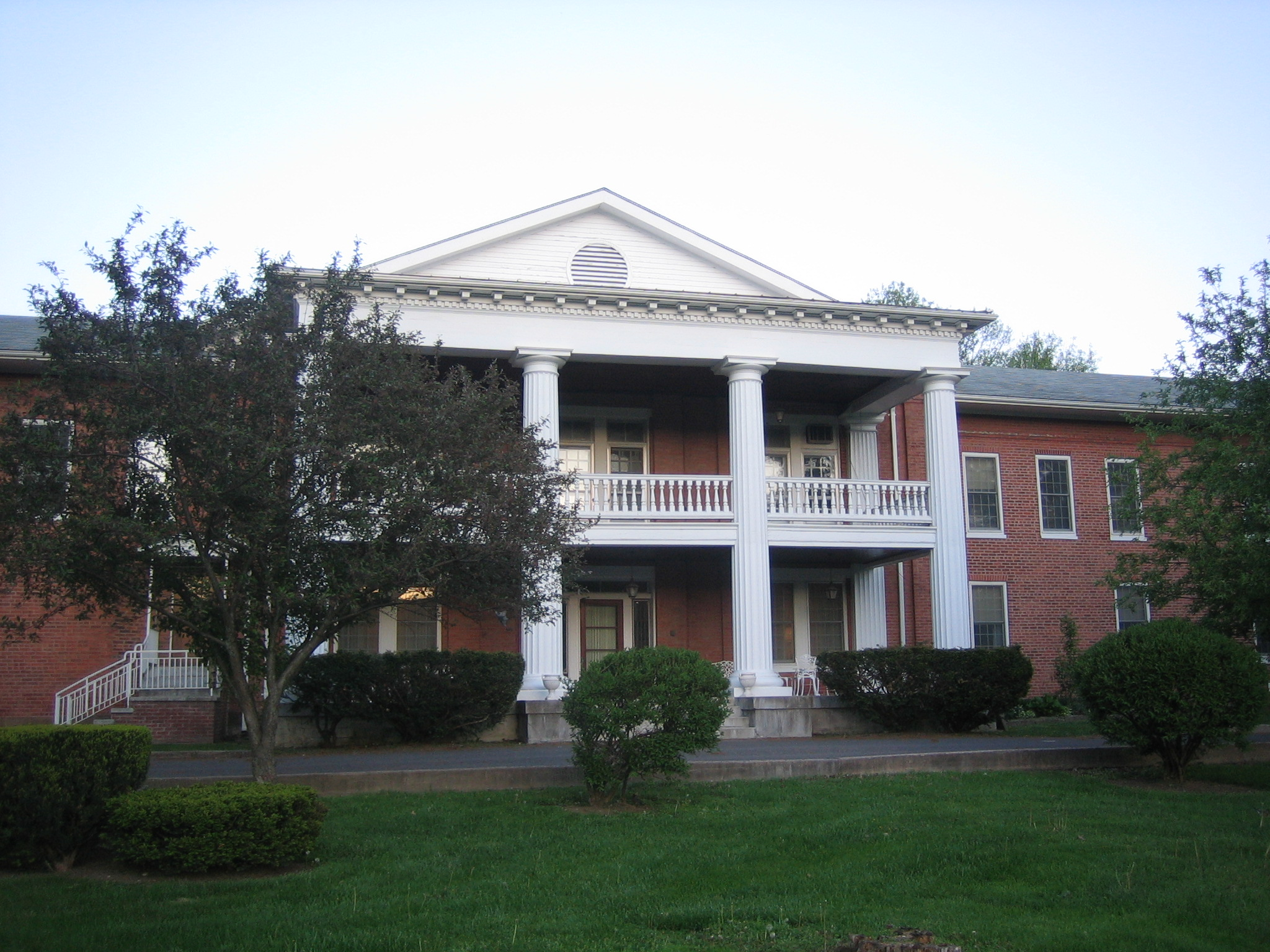

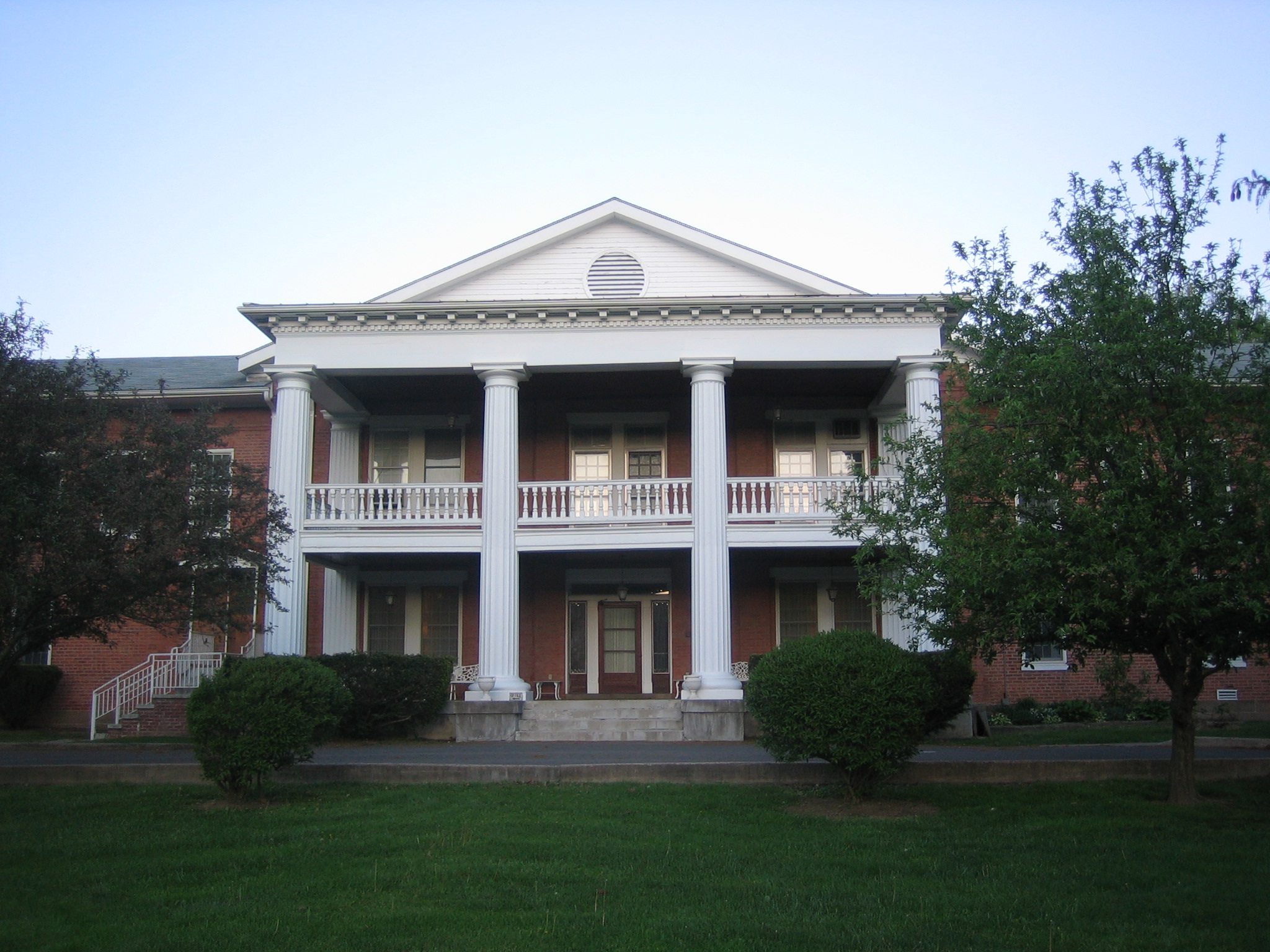

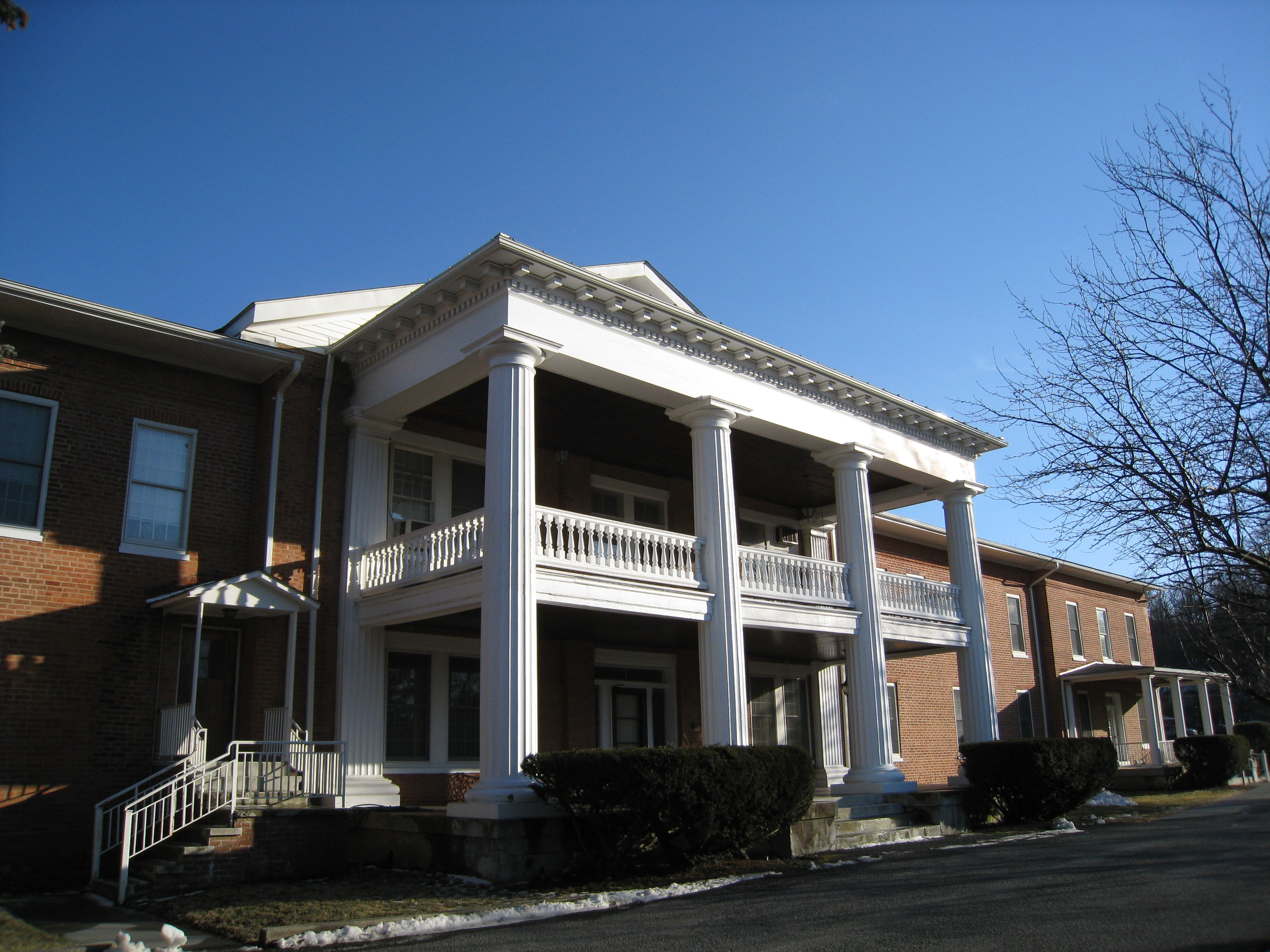

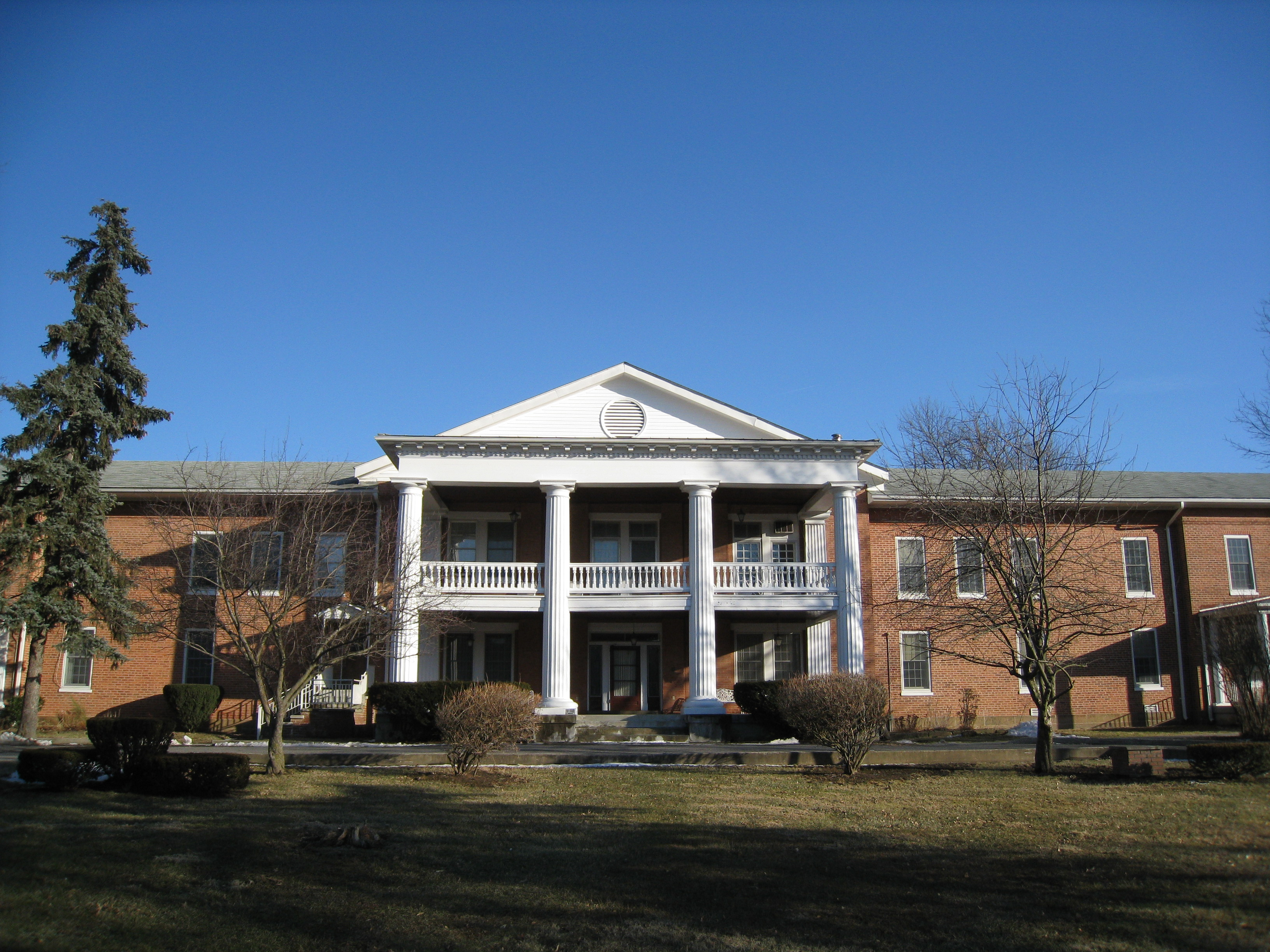

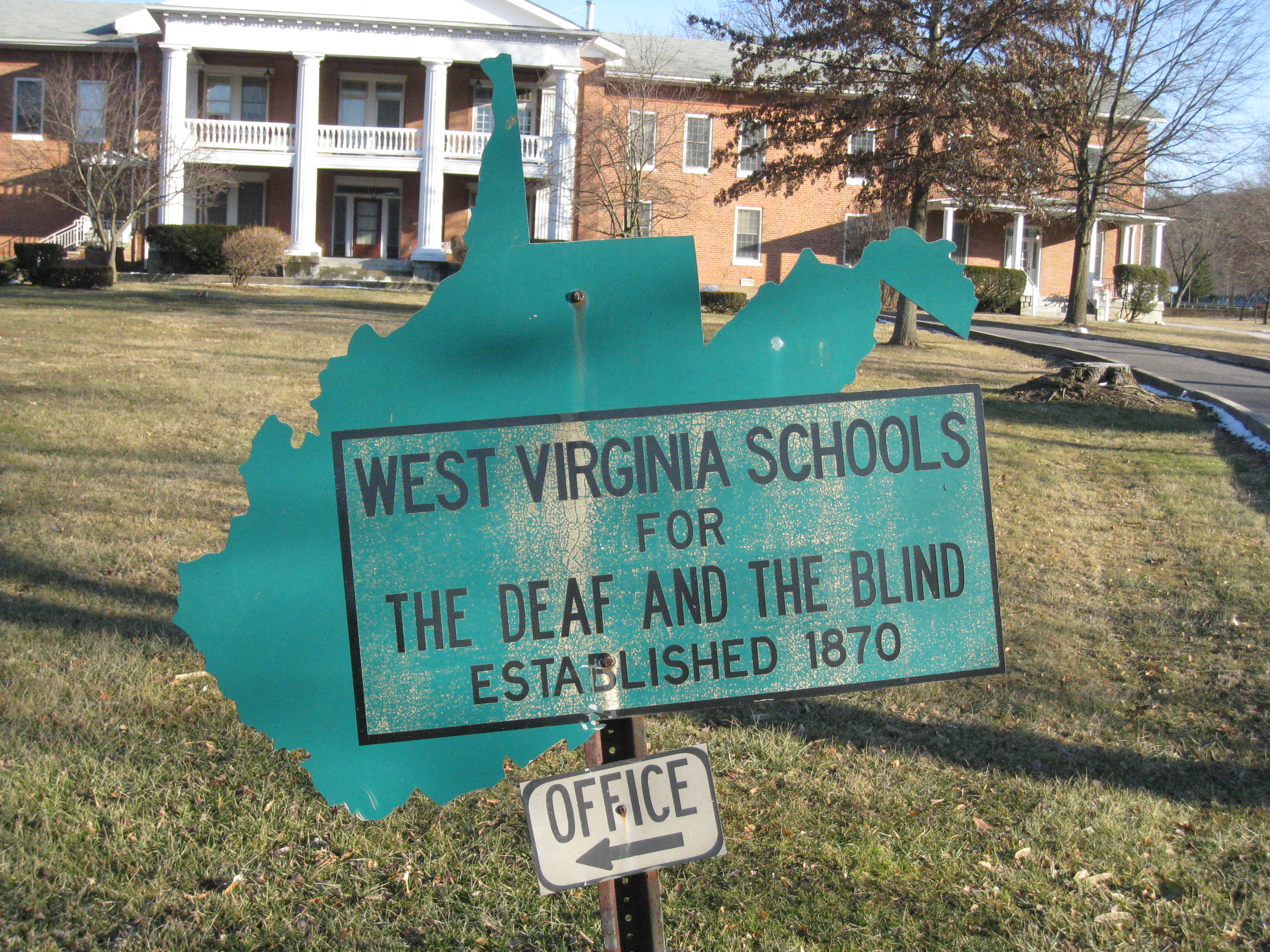

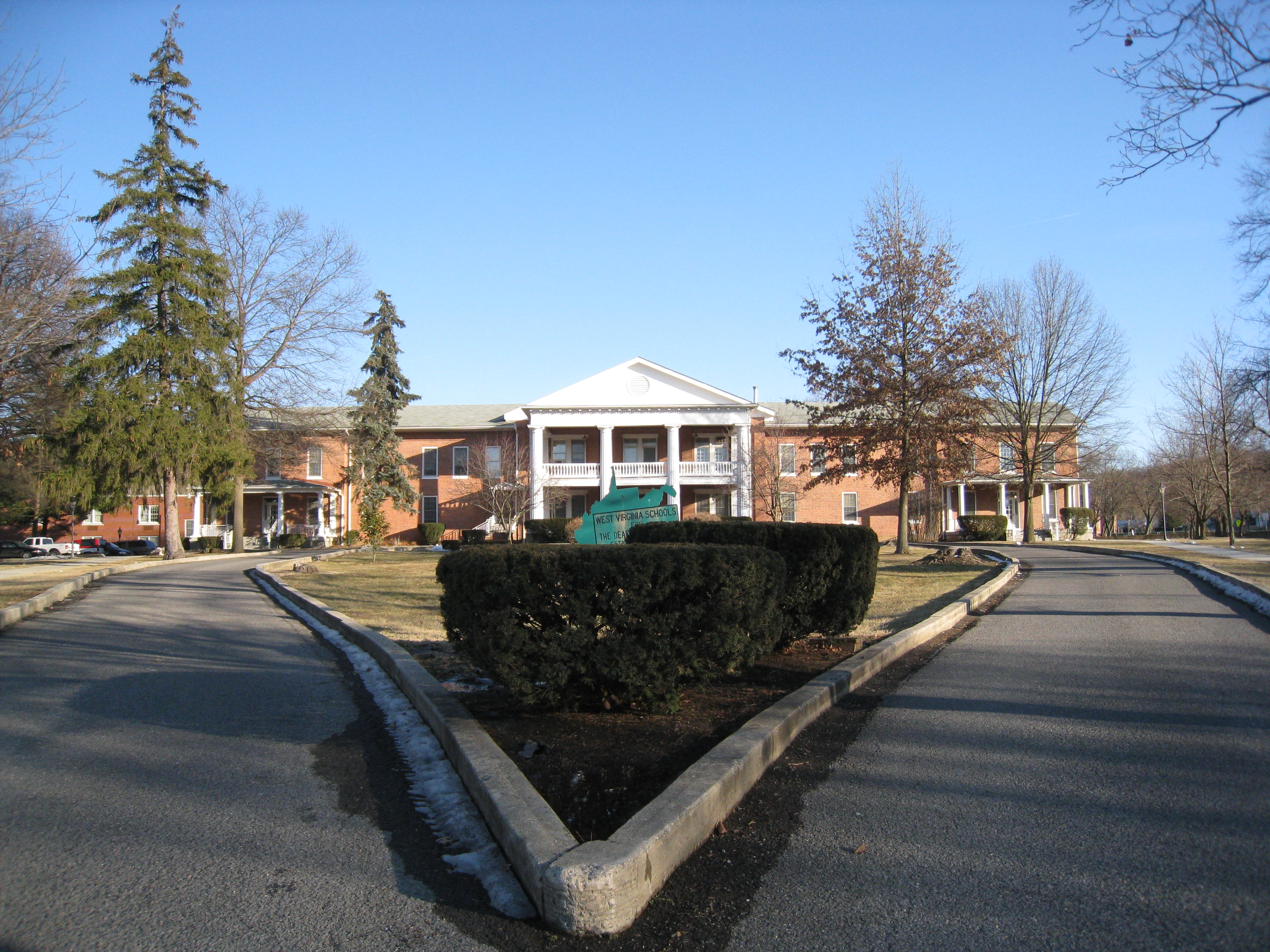

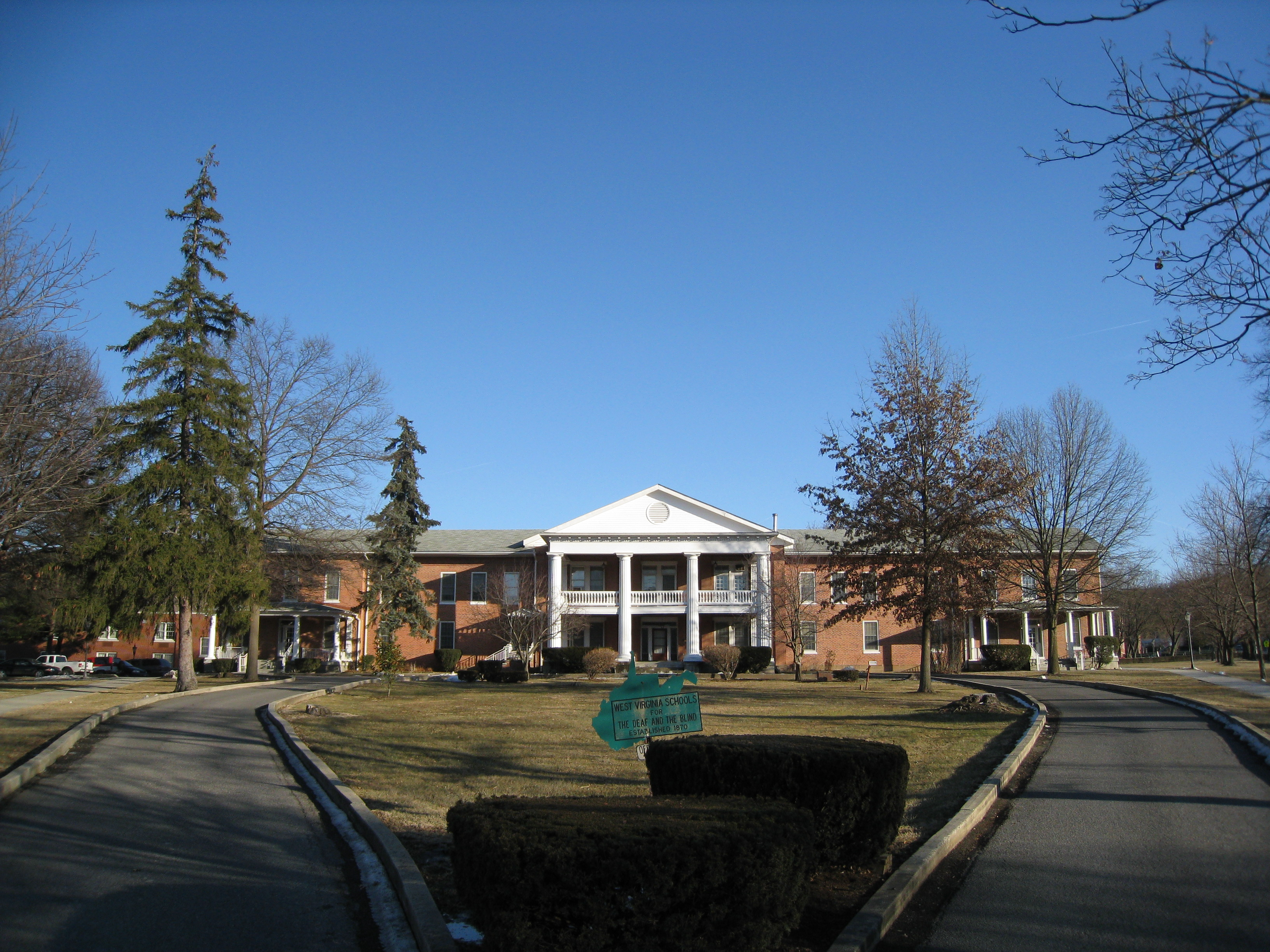

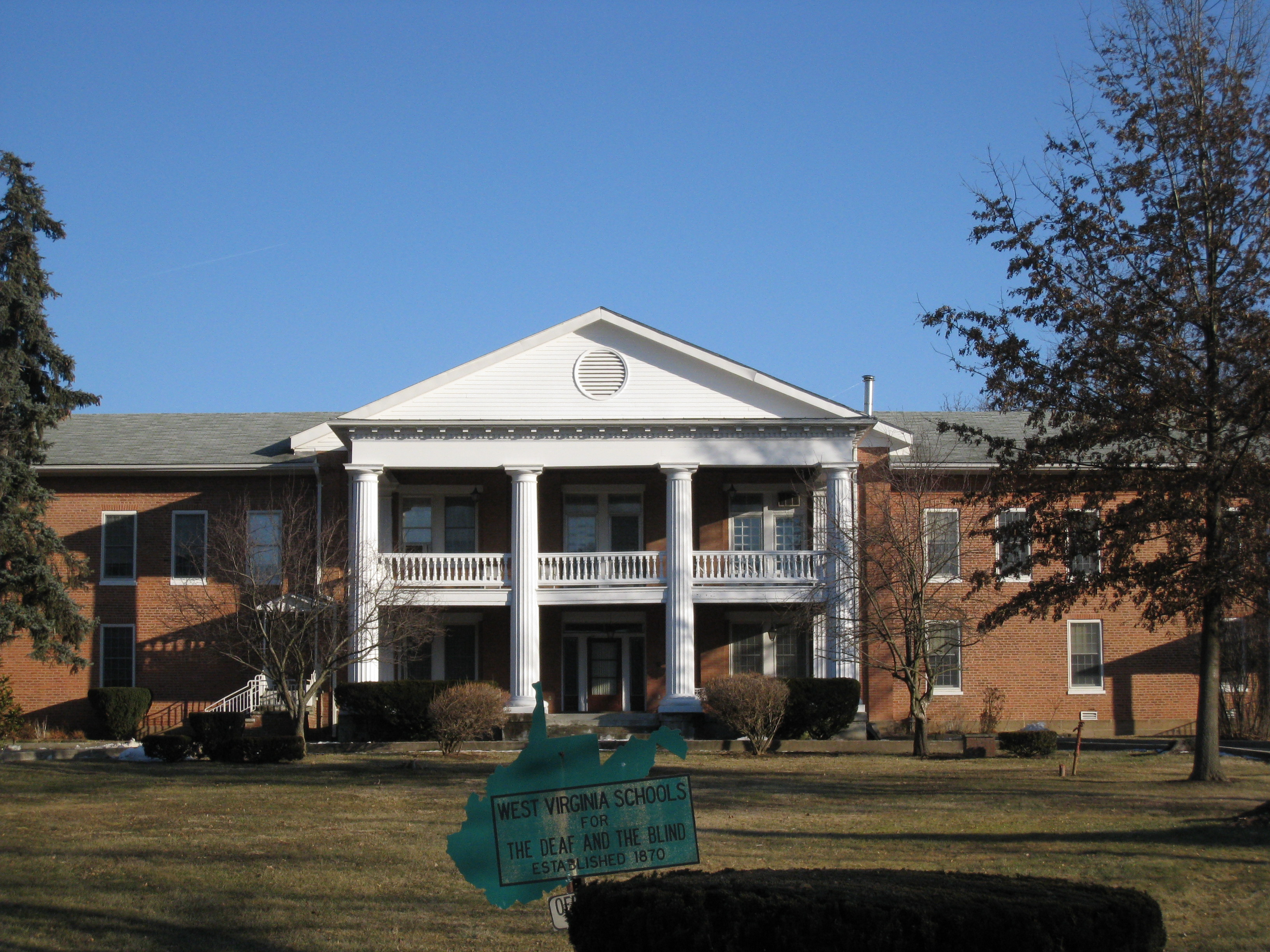

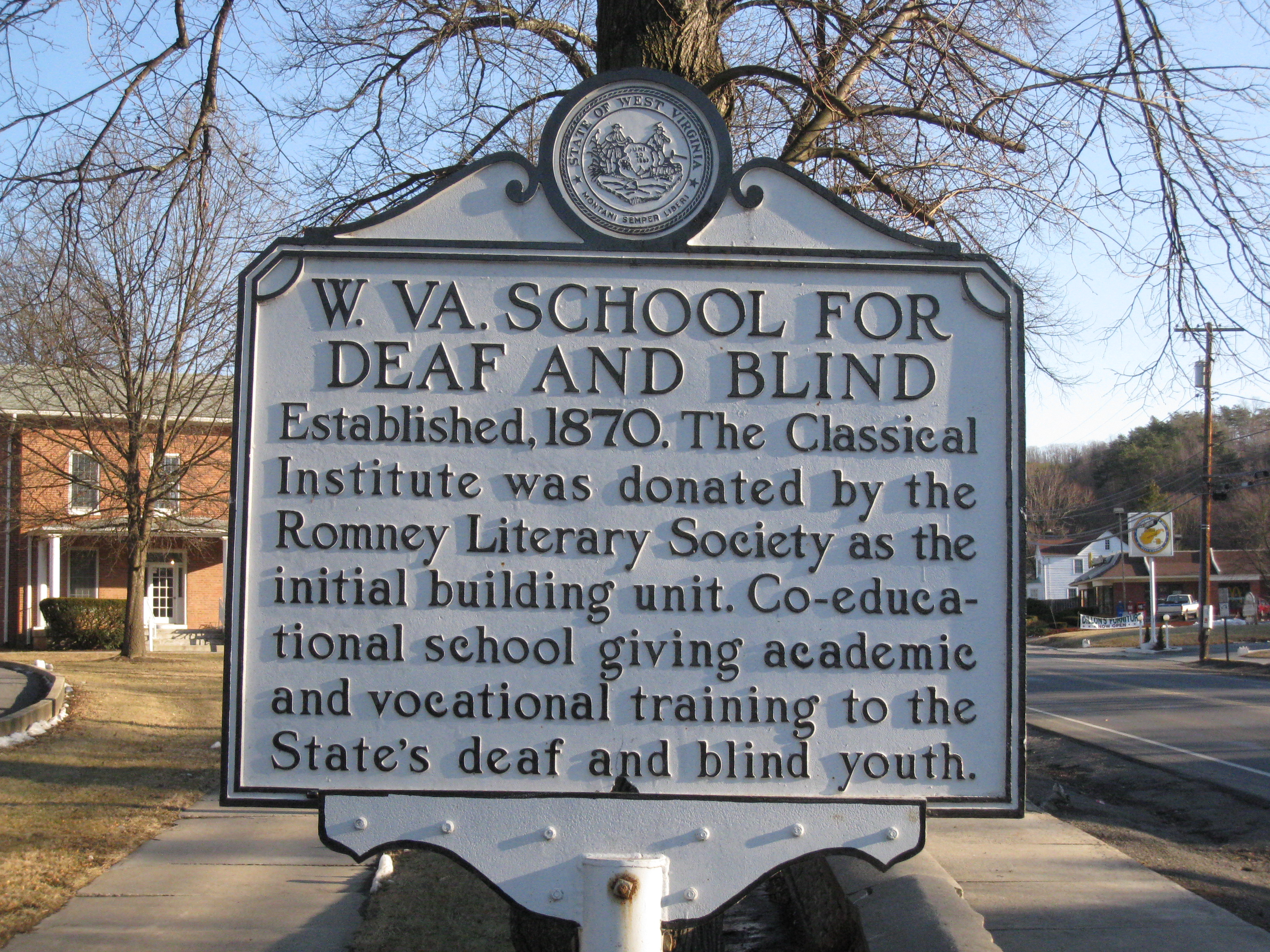

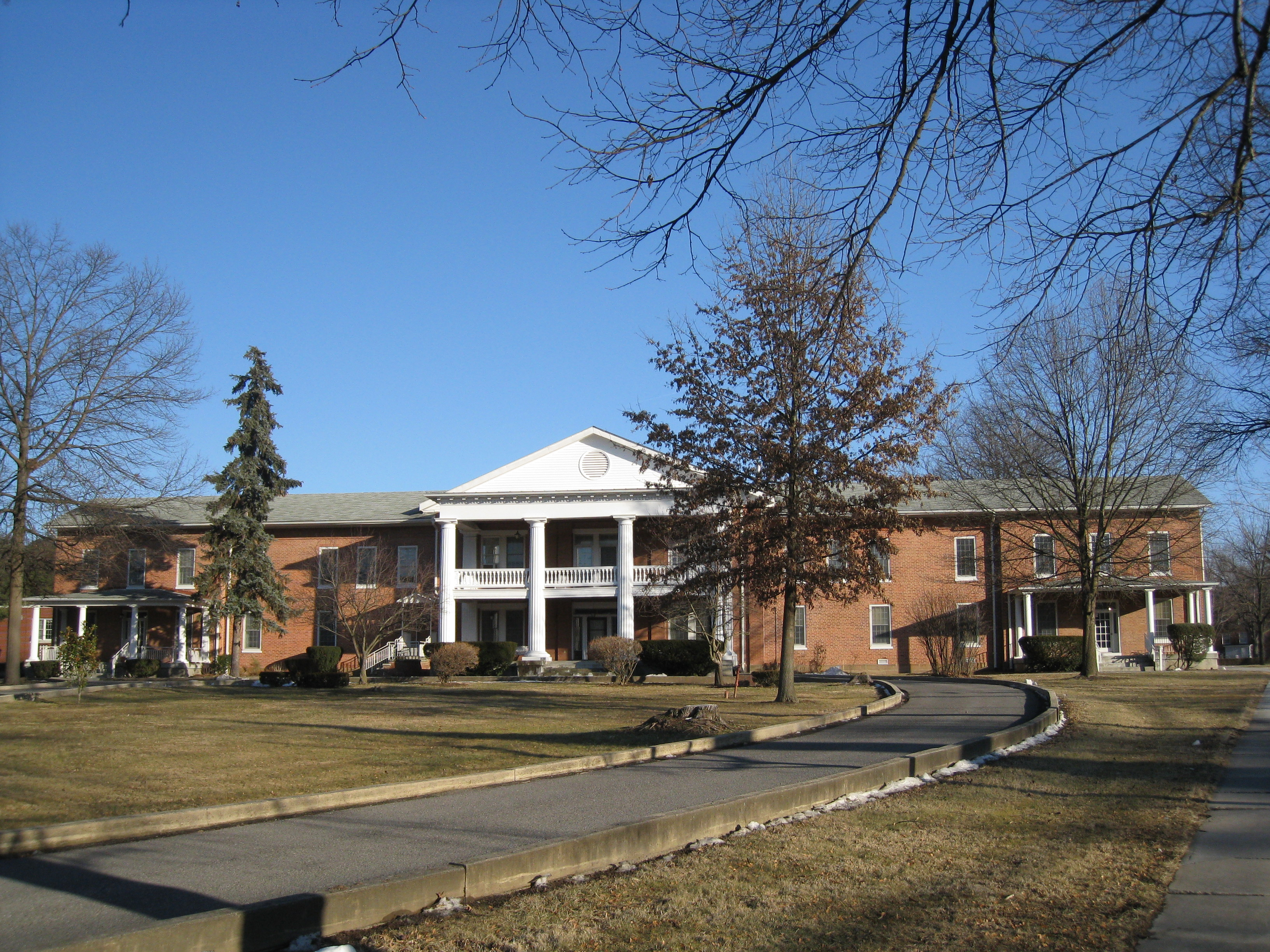

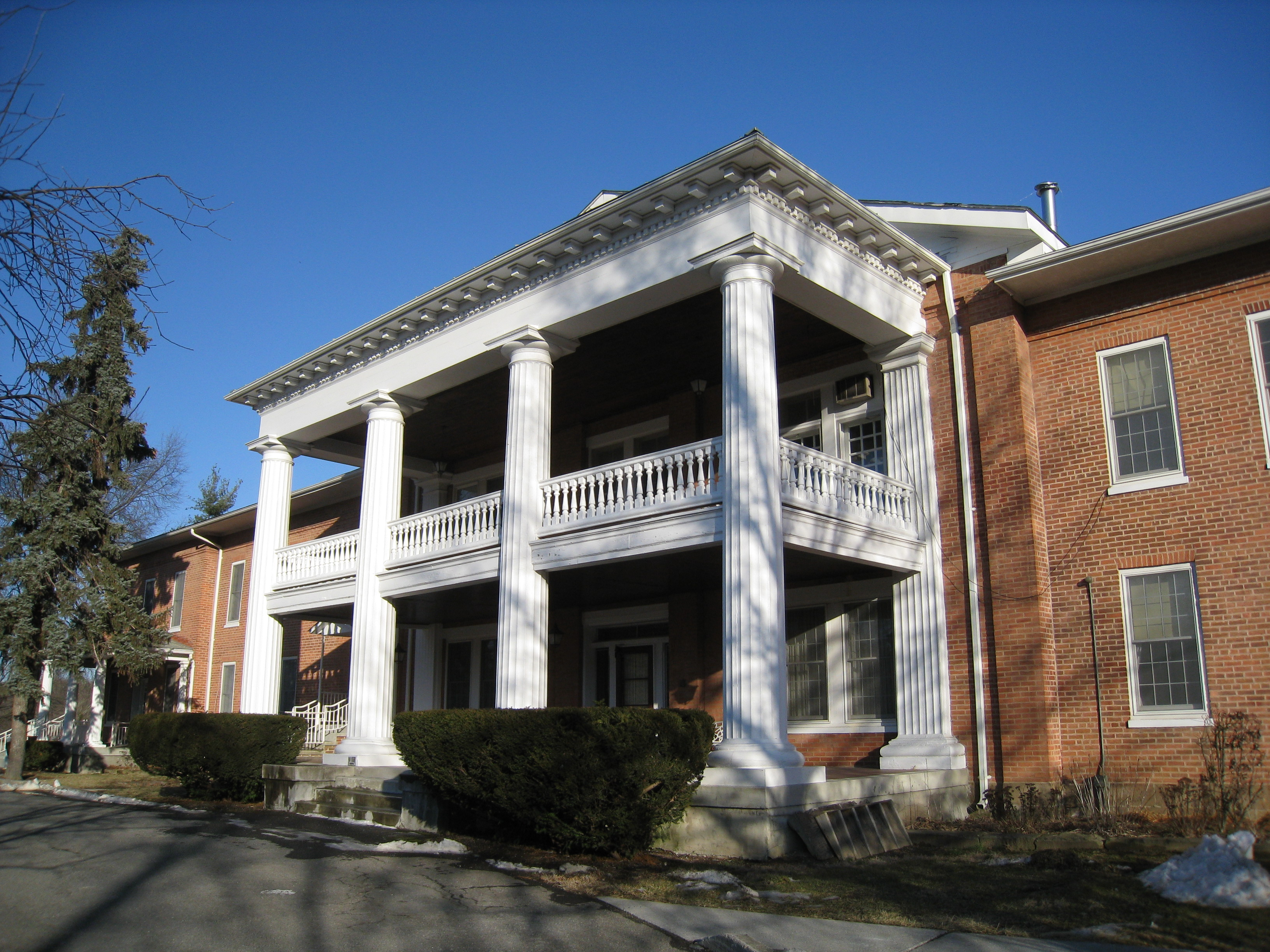

== See also ==
- Big Run (South Branch Potomac River)
- Literary Hall
- WVXS

== Bibliography ==
- Barnes, Clark S., ed. (2016). "Section Five: Institutions". West Virginia Blue Book (PDF). Charleston, West Virginia: West Virginia Senate. ISSN 0364-7323. OCLC 1012082243.
- Brannon, Selden W., ed. (1976). Historic Hampshire: A Symposium of Hampshire County and Its People, Past and Present. Parsons, West Virginia: McClain Printing Company. ISBN 978-0-87012-236-1. OCLC 3121468.
- Maxwell, Hu; Swisher, Howard Llewellyn (1897). History of Hampshire County, West Virginia From Its Earliest Settlement to the Present. Morgantown, West Virginia: A. Brown Boughner, Printer. OCLC 680931891. OL 23304577M – via the Internet Archive.
