= Howard Hille Johnson =

American educator and school founder

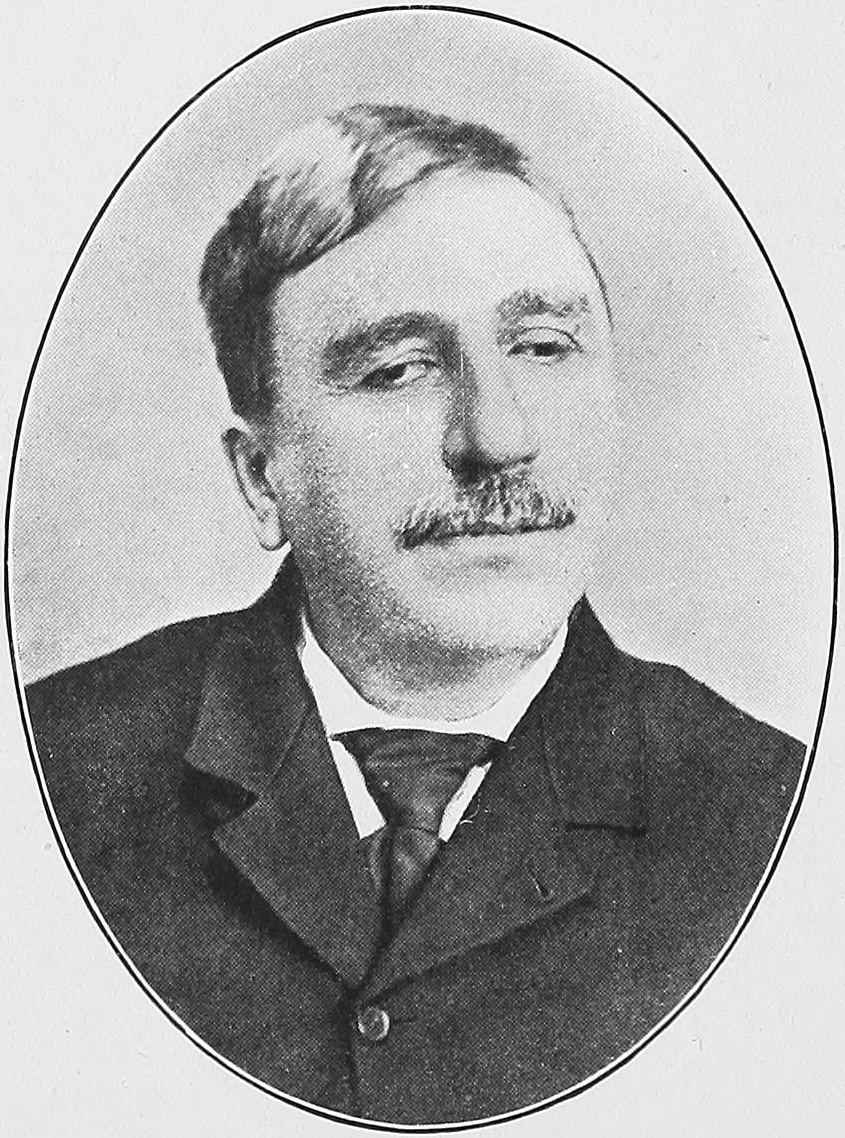
- Photographic portrait, published 1905
- Born: February 19, 1846; Friend's Run near Franklin, Virginia (now West Virginia), U.S.
- Died: February 8, 1913 (aged 66); Romney, West Virginia, U.S.
- Resting place: Indian Mound Cemetery, Romney, West Virginia, U.S.
- Education: Virginia School for the Deaf and the Blind; New Market Polytechnic Institute
- Occupations: Schoolteacher; poet; writer
- Employer: West Virginia Schools for the Deaf and Blind
- Known for: Founding the West Virginia Schools for the Deaf and Blind
- Spouses: Ms. Barbee; Elizabeth Neale
- Children: Leila B. Johnson; William T. Johnson; H. Guy Johnson; George N. Johnson; Lucy N. Johnson
- Parent: Jacob F. Johnson (father)
- Relatives: James Johnson (grandfather); James Johnson (brother)

Howard Hille Johnson (February 19, 1846 – February 8, 1913) was a blind American educator and writer in the states of Virginia and West Virginia. Johnson was instrumental in the establishment of the West Virginia Schools for the Deaf and Blind in 1870, after which he taught blind students at the institution's School for the Blind for 43 years.

Johnson was born in 1846 near Franklin in Pendleton County, Virginia (now West Virginia) to the affluent and prominent Johnson family. His father, Colonel Jacob F. Johnson, represented Pendleton County in the West Virginia Legislature and his grandfather, James Johnson, represented the county in the Virginia General Assembly. Like his elder brother James, Johnson was born with severe visual impairment which became total blindness a few years after his birth. He and his brother received their early education at home from a governess. Johnson furthered his education at the Virginia School for the Deaf and the Blind, a common school in Franklin during the American Civil War, and at a classical school in New Market. During his studies at New Market, Johnson made considerable progress in mathematics, literature, science and foreign languages.

In 1865 he returned to Franklin, where he and his brother conducted a private classical school. Johnson undertook advanced studies at the Virginia School for the Deaf and the Blind for his profession as a teacher from 1866 to 1867. He returned to Franklin, establishing a public school under the free education system, and in 1868 accepted a teaching position at a Moorefield public school.

In early 1869, Johnson identified the need for a school for the blind in the new state of West Virginia; with statehood, deaf and blind West Virginia children attended schools for the deaf and blind in neighboring states (with West Virginia paying their tuition). Johnson began corresponding with West Virginia Governor William E. Stevenson, canvassing across the state to arouse public sentiment in support of a school for the blind. Despite rebukes from prominent West Virginian politicians, Johnson became the leading advocate for a state institution for the blind. He and other educated blind people staged an exhibition in the legislative chamber of the West Virginia House of Delegates, which was praised by the legislators.

The bill establishing the school was presented to the West Virginia House of Delegates for a vote, and before it became state law the words "deaf and dumb" were inserted before "blind" throughout its text. The final version of the bill establishing the West Virginia Institution for the Deaf, Dumb and Blind became state law on March 3, 1870. At the time of the institution's establishment Johnson was only 24 years old, and is credited by West Virginia historians as the founder of the West Virginia Schools for the Deaf and Blind. Serving on the school's inaugural Board of Regents, he was later selected as its principal teacher. The school began its first academic session on September 29, 1870. Johnson taught in its blind department continuously for 43 years, until his death in 1913. In addition to his educational work, Johnson wrote prose and poetry and was a member of the Romney Literary Society.

== Early life and family ==
Johnson was born on February 19, 1846, at his family's home on Friend's Run, near Franklin in Pendleton County, Virginia (now West Virginia). His father, Colonel Jacob F. Johnson, was a prominent citizen of the county and served in the West Virginia Legislature from 1872 to 1873. Johnson's grandfather, James Johnson, represented Pendleton County in the Virginia General Assembly and was a member of the 1829 Virginia Constitutional Convention. Like his elder brother James, Johnson was born with severe visual impairment which became total blindness several years after his birth. His affluent parents were determined to prepare Johnson and his brother for the challenges of life by providing them with the opportunities afforded to sighted children, arranging for their sons to receive a good education and "proper instruction" and teaching them self-sufficiency. Johnson's father employed a governess to instruct him and his brother at home, and James was taught to read from books using braille.

== Education ==
James (Howard's brother) enrolled at the Virginia School for the Deaf and the Blind in Staunton in 1848 at age ten, completing his coursework there in 1855. After his graduation Johnson's father urged James to become a teacher, and at age 17 he taught a summer school on the South Fork South Branch Potomac River. James was also Howard's primary instructor, preparing him for higher education. Johnson followed in his brother's footsteps two years later, enrolling at the Virginia School for the Deaf and the Blind at age eleven. Although he studied there for four years, the school closed after the 1861 outbreak of the American Civil War and he was unable to complete his education there. At Staunton, teachers and acquaintances acknowledged Johnson's "remarkably rapid" progress in his studies. His studies were otherwise uninterrupted during the war; he attended a common school in Franklin, and was taught by James with sighted children. Johnson could not read text, and his lessons were read to him by his classmates.

In 1863 James encouraged him to further his education at a classical school in New Market, since Johnson had completed the coursework at the Franklin common school. The New Market school was taught by Joseph Salyards (or Saliards), a professor and writer described as one of "the most learned men of the age" and "a most remarkable scholar in many respects." Johnson was accompanied to New Market by a young man with the surname of Clark, who read him his lessons; he tutored Clark in several subjects, including French. At New Market, Johnson made so much progress in mathematics, literature, science and foreign languages with his sighted classmates that he returned to Franklin after two years. In 1866 the Virginia School for the Deaf and the Blind in Staunton offered him the opportunity to advance his professional studies in education, and he completed one term in 1867.

After Johnson's departure the New Market school became known as the New Market Polytechnic Institute, with Salyards remaining on its faculty. The institute, through Salyards' efforts, conferred on him a "most gratefully appreciated" Master of Arts degree in 1877.

== Early teaching career ==
When Johnson returned to Franklin from New Market he was reunited with James, and they founded a private classical school where he taught during the winter of 1865–66. The Johnsons' school offered an opportunity for young men in Franklin whose studies were interrupted by the war to complete their education.

After Johnson finished his term at the Virginia School for the Deaf and the Blind, he returned to Franklin and founded a public school in September 1867 operating under the free education system recently authorized in Pendleton County. The following year he accepted a teaching position in Moorefield, teaching with "great acceptance" for three successive terms at a public school.

== Campaign for a West Virginia school for the blind ==
=== Search for public support ===
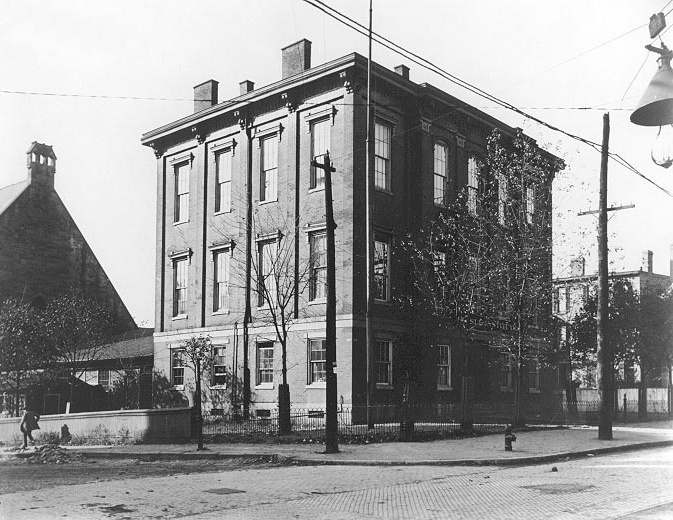
The Linsly Institute building (built 1858) in Wheeling, the West Virginia capitol building when Johnson's bill establishing the West Virginia Schools for the Deaf and Blind was passed on March 3, 1870

While Johnson was teaching at Moorefield in early 1869, he decided to establish a state school for the education of the blind; no provision for such a school had been made in the new state's public-school system since its creation six years earlier. Before West Virginia statehood, deaf and blind youth in western Virginia attended the Virginia School for the Deaf and the Blind in Staunton (as Johnson had). After statehood, deaf and blind West Virginia children attended schools for the deaf and blind in neighboring states; West Virginia paid their tuition. Hoping to expedite the foundation of a state school for the blind, Johnson began a correspondence with newly-inaugurated Governor William E. Stevenson (who assured Johnson of his "sympathy and support" for the school). In addition to lobbying the governor, Johnson began canvassing the state to arouse public support for the proposed school.

=== Search for legislative support ===
Due to Johnson's campaign, which gained wide public support for the school, the West Virginia Legislature convened a session in Wheeling (then the state's capital) on January 18, 1870, and proposed legislation establishing a school for the blind that year. After drafting the bill, Johnson traveled to Wheeling; en route, at Fairmont, he met former Union Governor of Virginia Francis Harrison Pierpont. Although Johnson tried to enlist Pierpont's support in formally presenting the proposed legislation to the legislature, Pierpont said that he "could not afford to connect his name with an enterprise so sure to fail". Pierpont was not the only state legislator to decline Johnson's request; Joseph S. Wheat, member of the West Virginia House of Delegates representing Morgan County, believed that the proposed bill would fail because he felt that the state could not establish any more public institutions.

Undaunted by these rebukes from prominent West Virginian politicians, Johnson remained the leading advocate for a state institution for the blind. With help from friends and other educated blind people, he was granted the use of the legislative chamber of the West Virginia House of Delegates to present an exhibition of "music, [scholarly] recitation, and class drill" with a delegation including his brother James and blind educator Susan Ridenour. Johnson's exhibition attracted a large audience, and after the performance he delivered an impassioned plea to West Virginia lawmakers to establish a state school for West Virginia's blind youth. The exhibition and Johnson's speech were praised by the legislators, most notably Joseph Wheat (who had previously rebuffed his proposal). The day before Johnson's presentation, Wheat declared his opposition to the bill and advocated its defeat; after Johnson's speech he "pressed up to [Johnson] and grasping his hand, said earnestly, 'Johnson, I'll vote for your bill if it costs a hundred thousand dollars'".

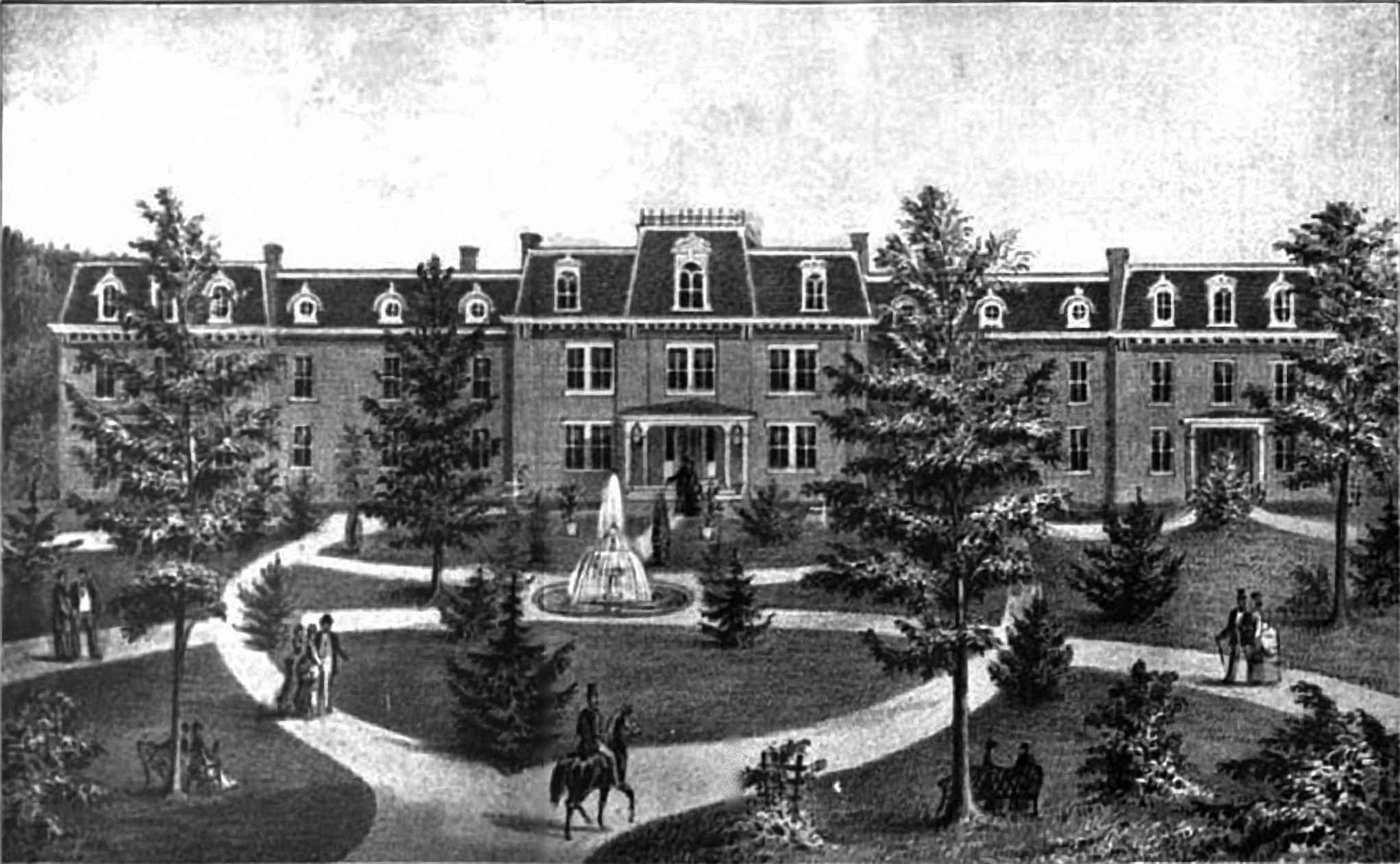
West Virginia Schools for the Deaf and Blind administration building in an 1880 engraving; the administration building (1846) and its grounds were the campus for the Romney Classical Institute before the American Civil War.

The bill for the school was presented to the House of Delegates by John James Davis, representing Harrison County. When it was introduced it outlined the establishment of a school only for the blind, not the deaf. The approved bill progressed through the necessary steps, and shortly before it became state law it was amended by House Delegate James Monroe Jackson of Wood County; Johnson advocated the insertion of "deaf and dumb" before "blind" in every instance in its text as a "humane and economic" measure. Jackson's amendment was accepted, and the bill establishing the West Virginia Institution for the Deaf, Dumb and Blind became state law on March 3, 1870. Although Johnson had campaigned for a state school for the blind, it was common practice during the 19th century to combine schools for the deaf and blind as one institution. At the time of the institution's founding he was 24 years old, and is credited by West Virginia historians as the founder of the West Virginia Schools for the Deaf and Blind. In Johnson's bill, the legislature agreed that "all deaf and dumb and blind youth, residents of the state of West Virginia, between the ages of six and twenty-five years, shall be admitted to pupilage in the institution on application to the principal until the institution is filled."

=== Institution site selection ===
After the bill's passage Johnson was appointed by Governor Stevenson to the institution's inaugural Board of Regents, which convened in Wheeling on April 20, 1870. Johnson and his fellow board members began a competition among West Virginia municipalities for the location of the new institution for the deaf and blind; the three finalists were Wheeling, Parkersburg and Romney. The board selected Wheeling, which offered its Female College campus. However, after the board's adjournment Female College supporters, unwilling to see the school closed, pressured city authorities to rescind their offer. At the board's June 23, 1870 meeting, Johnson and his colleagues unanimously selected Romney's proposal offering the Romney Classical Institute campus and an adjoining 15 acres (6.1 ha) of property on behalf of the Romney Literary Society. When the institution's site was finalized, the board reconvened on July 20, 1870, in Romney at the old Romney Classical Institute campus and selected its academic faculty and personnel. H. H. Hollister of the Ohio Institution for the Deaf and Blind was chosen as the school's first principal, and Johnson was appointed principal teacher of its School for the Blind.

== Career at the school ==
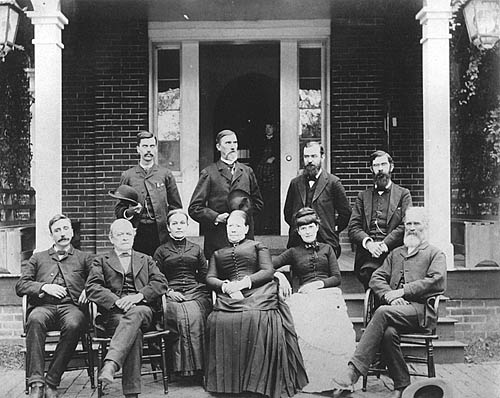
Faculty and staff at the West Virginia Schools for the Deaf and Blind in 1884. Standing (l–r): Mr. Shaeffer, Principal John Collins Covell, Abraham D. Hays and math professor E. L. Chapin. Seated (l–r): school founder Howard Hille Johnson, J. B. McGann, Lulie Kern, Martha Clelland, Sarah Caruthers and deaf school principal H. H. Chidester.

The West Virginia Schools for the Deaf and Blind began their first academic session on September 29, 1870, with an enrollment of thirty students: twenty-five were deaf and five blind. After the school's first academic year, Board of Regents secretary Robert White wrote in his report to Governor Stevenson: "Professor Johnson, in the instruction of the blind, has displayed a marked ability which is showing, and will show, good results in the department." Johnson represented the new school in 1871 at the inaugural convention of the American Association for Instructors of the Blind, and in 1876 he provided large maps used to teach his blind students as part of West Virginia's exhibit at the Centennial Exposition in Philadelphia. The exposition was the first world's fair hosted in the United States, and the first since West Virginia became a state in 1863.

During Johnson's twenty-seventh year of teaching at the West Virginia Schools for the Deaf and Blind, he framed a bill for the West Virginia Legislature which would separate the institution into two schools: one for the deaf and one for the blind. It read in part: "Be it enacted, That the West Virginia schools for the deaf and the blind, located at Romney, in the county of Hampshire, shall, after the expiration of the present term, that is to say after the 15th day June, 1897, cease to be a school for the education of deaf and blind youth, and shall thereafter be a school for the education of deaf youth only", and would provide a separate school for the blind. Despite Johnson's active support for the bill, it failed to pass. In 1892 he wrote an article which was published in the Perkins Institute for the Blind publication The Mentor, "Keep the Schools Out of Politics", decrying the appointment of school administrators, educators and trustees on the institute's Board of Regents based on affiliation with the West Virginia Democratic Party instead of qualifications.

Johnson taught in the school's blind department continuously for 43 years, until his death in 1913. He was the subject of an April 1899 article in The West Virginia School Journal, where he was described as "still in sound health and vigor" and "cheerful and patient" after 29 years of teaching. Despite his efforts to establish the West Virginia Schools for the Deaf and Blind and his long tenure, Johnson earned a minimal salary which enabled him to "eke out a bare living." During his career, he acquired a "working knowledge of several languages, a wide range of scientific knowledge, and of mathematics." In the 1897 History of Hampshire County, West Virginia: From Its Earliest Settlement to the Present, Hu Maxwell and Howard Llewellyn Swisher wrote about Johnson:

The wisdom and thoroughness of Mr. Johnson's home training are credited by him with whatever he has been able to accomplish, either for himself or his fellows under the like cloud of blindness, to the amelioration of whose condition he has devoted himself with singleness of heart.

— Hu Maxwell and Howard Llewellyn Swisher, History of Hampshire County, West Virginia: From Its Earliest Settlement to the Present (1897)

== Writing ==
Ah, veiled and clouded in eternal night,
The opening blossom, and the verdant plain,
And landscapes, smiling in the mellow light,
On me expend their holy charms in vain.

— Howard Hille Johnson, "Blindness"

In addition to his career as an academic and educator, Johnson was a prolific writer of prose and verse. He was elected to the Romney Literary Society, which donated its buildings and the grounds of the Romney Classical Institute to the West Virginia Schools for the Deaf and Blind after its establishment in 1870.

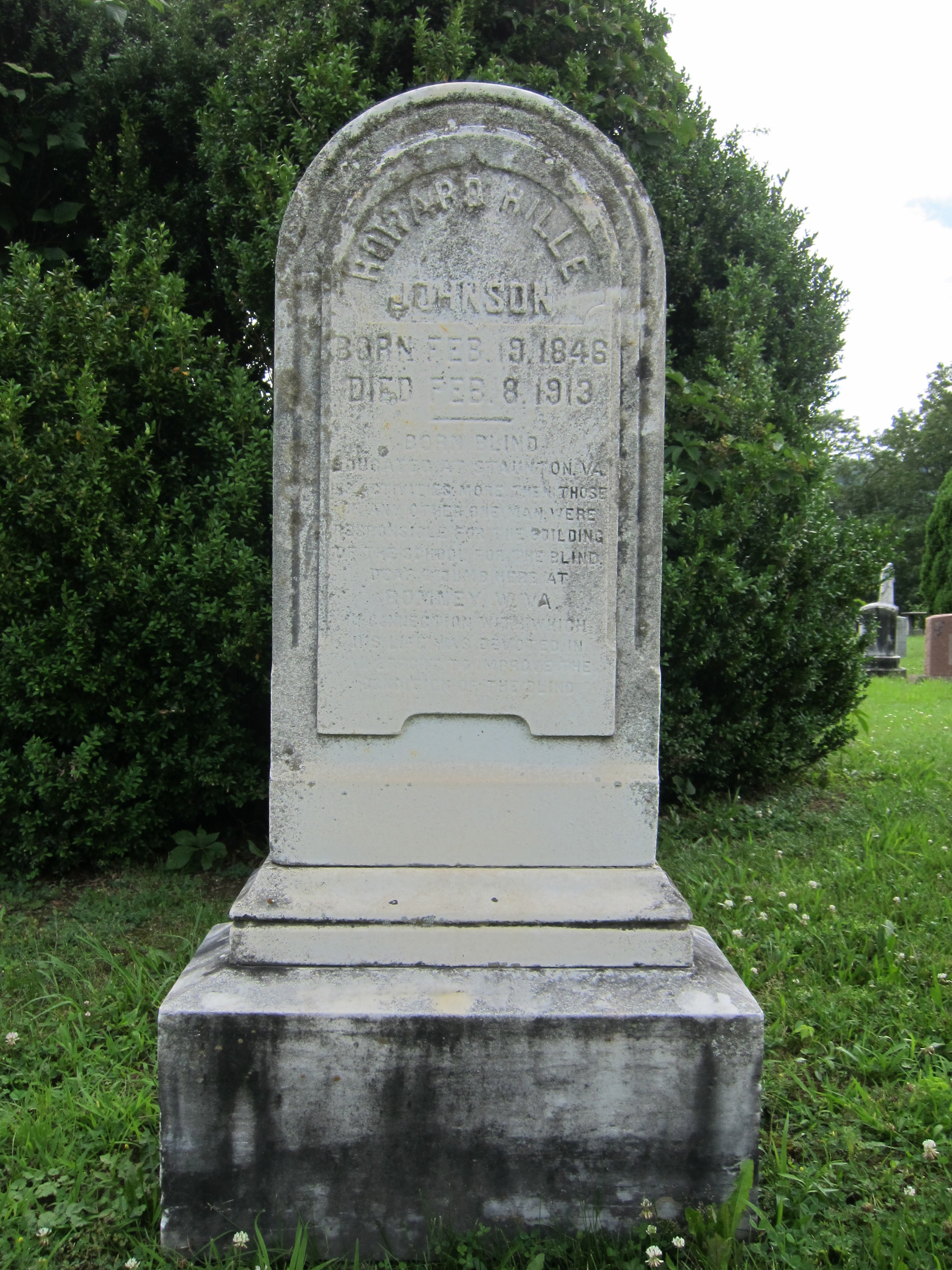
Johnson's gravesite at Indian Mound Cemetery

His poems include:

- "A Question"
- "Blindness"
- "Intuitive Love"
- "Hymn to Spring"

== Personal life ==
In 1868 Johnson married Ms. Barbee of Virginia, and they had three children: Leila B. Johnson, William T. Johnson and H. Guy (or Howard H.) Johnson. His wife died in 1880, and his children from his first marriage were raised by their grandparents in Bridgewater, Virginia. In 1882 Johnson married Elizabeth Neale, the daughter of Hamlet V. Neale of Keyser. He and Elizabeth had two children: George N. Johnson and Lucy N. Johnson. Johnson died as a result of paralysis on February 8, 1913, in Romney, and is buried in its Indian Mound Cemetery.

== Bibliography ==
- Alumni Association of the Perkins Institution for the Blind (1892). The Mentor, Volume 2. Boston: Alumni Association of the Perkins Institution for the Blind. OCLC 8674074. Archived from the original on November 16, 2013 – via Google Books.
- American Association of Instructors of the Blind (1926). American Association of Instructors of the Blind: Twenty-Eighth Biennial Convention. Nashville, Tennessee: American Association of Instructors of the Blind. OCLC 6695030. Archived from the original on June 26, 2014 – via Google Books.
- Brannon, Selden W., ed. (1976). Historic Hampshire: A Symposium of Hampshire County and Its People, Past and Present. Parsons, West Virginia: McClain Printing Company. ISBN 978-0-87012-236-1. OCLC 3121468.
- Gannon, Jack R.; Butler, Jane; Gilbert, Laura-Jean (1981). Deaf Heritage: A Narrative History of Deaf America. Silver Spring, Maryland: National Association of the Deaf. ISBN 978-0-913072-38-7. OCLC 7369253 – via Internet Archive.
- Massachusetts Association for Promoting the Interests of the Blind; American Association of Instructors of the Blind; American Foundation for the Blind (1908). "Outlook for the Blind, Volume 2". Outlook for the Blind. Cambridge, Massachusetts: Massachusetts Association for Promoting the Interests of the Blind. ISSN 0885-5838. OCLC 1588441. Archived from the original on November 16, 2013 – via Google Books.
- Maxwell, Hu; Swisher, Howard Llewellyn (1897). History of Hampshire County, West Virginia From Its Earliest Settlement to the Present. Morgantown, West Virginia: A. Brown Boughner, Printer. OCLC 680931891. OL 23304577M.
- Miller, Thomas Condit; Maxwell, Hu (1913). West Virginia and Its People, Volume 1. New York City: Lewis Historical Publishing Company. OCLC 1449151. Archived from the original on June 4, 2016 – via Google Books.
- Morgan, Benjamin Stephen; Cork, Jacob F.; West Virginia Board of World's Fair Managers (1893). Columbian History of Education in West Virginia. Charleston, West Virginia: Moses W. Donnally, Printer. OCLC 3745899. Archived from the original on November 2, 2013 – via Google Books.
- Morton, Oren Frederic (1910). A History of Pendleton County, West Virginia. Dayton, Virginia: Ruebush-Elkins Company. ISBN 9781548664992. OCLC 19667868. Archived from the original on June 26, 2014 – via Google Books.
- Munske, Roberta R.; Kerns, Wilmer L., eds. (2004). Hampshire County, West Virginia, 1754–2004. Romney, West Virginia: The Hampshire County 250th Anniversary Committee. ISBN 978-0-9715738-2-6. OCLC 55983178.
- Volta Bureau; Principals and Superintendents of the Schools for the Deaf (1893). Histories of American Schools for the Deaf, 1817–1893, Volume 2: Public Schools in the United States. Washington, D.C.: Volta Bureau. OCLC 760733 – via Internet Archive.
- West Virginia Department of Commerce; West Virginia Arts and Humanities Council; West Virginia Division of Culture and History (2002). Goldenseal. Vol. 28. Charleston, West Virginia: West Virginia Department of Commerce. ISSN 0099-0159. OCLC 2242808. Archived from the original on October 31, 2013 – via Google Books.
- West Virginia State Board of Control (1908). Biennial Report, Volume 1. Charleston, West Virginia: Union Publishing Company. OCLC 40372577. Archived from the original on November 27, 2013 – via Google Books.
- West Virginia State Department of Free Schools (1899). The West Virginia School Journal. Vol. 19. Charleston, West Virginia: West Virginia State Department of Free Schools. OCLC 19600650. Archived from the original on June 29, 2014 – via Google Books.
