= John Collins Covell =

American educator and school administrator (1823–1887)

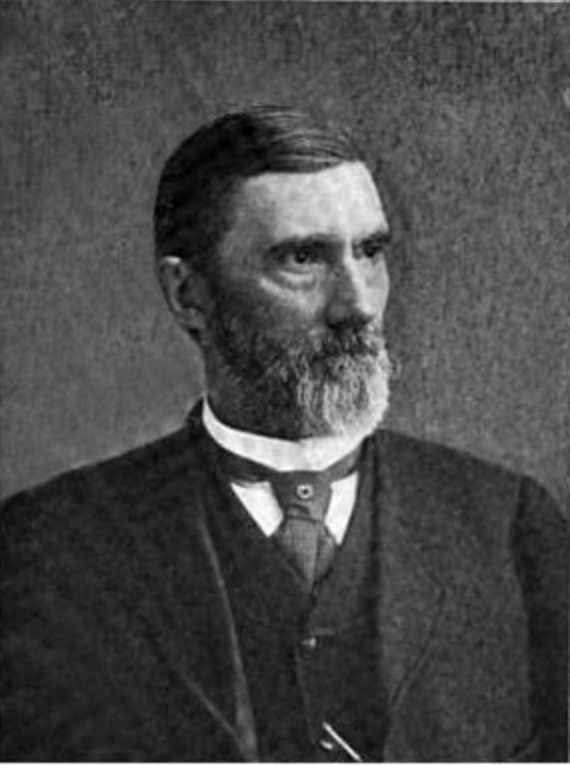

Principal of the West Virginia Schools for the Deaf and Blind
- In office 1874–1887
- Preceded by: Leveus Eddy
- Succeeded by: Henry Bell Gilkeson

Principal of the Virginia School for the Deaf and Blind
- In office 1862–1872
- Preceded by: Jean Merillat
- Succeeded by: Charles D. McCoy

Personal details
- Born: December 19, 1823 Newport, Rhode Island, United States
- Died: June 4, 1887 (aged 63) Romney, West Virginia, United States
- Resting place: Indian Mound Cemetery, Romney, West Virginia, United States
- Spouse: Anita "Annie" Elizabeth Eskridge
- Relations: Joseph S. Covell (father); John Collins (grandfather)
- Children: five children including: Mary Avery Covell Parsons; Annie Baldwin Covell Heiskell
- Profession: educator, school administrator

Military service
- Allegiance: Confederate States of America
- Branch/service: Confederate States Army
- Years of service: 1861
- Rank: Major
- Battles/wars: American Civil War

John Collins Covell (December 19, 1823 – June 4, 1887) was a 19th-century American educator and school administrator specializing in deaf education in the U.S. states of Virginia and West Virginia.

Born in 1823 in Rhode Island, Covell was the son of Episcopal minister Reverend Joseph S. Covell and the grandson of Rhode Island Governor John Collins. Covell attended Trinity College and graduated from the institution in 1847. He was recommended as a candidate for Holy Orders in the Episcopal Diocese of Connecticut and received the orders of a deacon.

Covell accepted a teaching position in the Deaf Department of the Virginia School for the Deaf and the Blind and relocated there in 1847. Covell was made a vice-principal of the institution and given charge of the entire Deaf Mute Department in 1852. During the American Civil War, Covell entered the Confederate States Army with the rank of major and served on the staff of Brigadier General Henry A. Wise. Covell served on General Wise's staff only briefly before returning to the Virginia School for the Deaf and Blind to serve as its principal in 1862, a position he held until 1872. In 1874, Covell was selected to serve as the principal of the West Virginia Schools for the Deaf and Blind. Under his leadership, the West Virginia Schools for the Deaf and Blind experienced "unprecedented success" and its student body began to grow due to his initiatives. He served as the institution's principal until his death in 1887.

Covell was an active and prominent member of the Episcopal Diocese of West Virginia and was appointed the first churchwarden of Saint Stephen's Episcopal Church in Romney. Covell played an instrumental role in the construction of the church through his donation of property for the building site and his financial contribution of the majority of its construction costs.

== Early life and education ==
John Collins Covell was born on December 19, 1823, in Newport, Rhode Island, and was the son of Episcopal minister, Reverend Joseph S. Covell. Covell was named for his maternal grandfather, Rhode Island Governor John Collins. He spent his childhood in Princess Anne, Maryland, where he received his education from the common schools for eight years before attending an academy in Connecticut. Covell then worked as a store clerk for three years. Seeking to further his education, Covell attended Trinity College in Hartford, Connecticut, and graduated from the institution in 1847. After graduating from Trinity College, Covell was recommended as a candidate for Holy Orders in the Episcopal Diocese of Connecticut and received the orders of a deacon in the Episcopal Church.

== Educator and school administrator ==
=== Virginia School for the Deaf and the Blind ===
Upon graduating from Trinity College, Covell accepted a teaching position in the Deaf Department of the Virginia School for the Deaf and the Blind in Staunton, Virginia and relocated there in September 1847. Covell continued teaching until 1852 when he was made a vice-principal of the institution and given charge of the entire Deaf Mute Department.

Following the outbreak of the American Civil War in 1861, Covell entered the Confederate States Army with the rank of major and served on the staff of Brigadier General Henry A. Wise. Covell served on General Wise's staff only briefly before the state of Virginia recalled him to the Virginia School for the Deaf and Blind in 1862 to become the institution's principal. According to the National Conference of Superintendents and Principals of Institutions for Deaf Mutes in 1888, the state of Virginia considered Covell's services "of more value as manager of one of her noblest public institutions than as a soldier in the field." While serving as principal, Covell continued to head and instruct in the school's Deaf Mute Department. Covell remained principal of the Virginia School for the Deaf and Blind for nine years until his resignation from the institution in 1872.

In an 1870 address entitled "The Nobility, Dignity, and Antiquity of the Sign Language" which Covell delivered at the Convention of American Instructors of the Deaf in Indianapolis, Indiana, he asserted that sign language would gain in popularity among hearing people and would be taught alongside philology as part of the basic curricula of universities. Over a century after Covell's 1870 prediction, American Sign Language has been added to curricula of language departments in a growing number of American universities.

=== West Virginia Schools for the Deaf and Blind ===
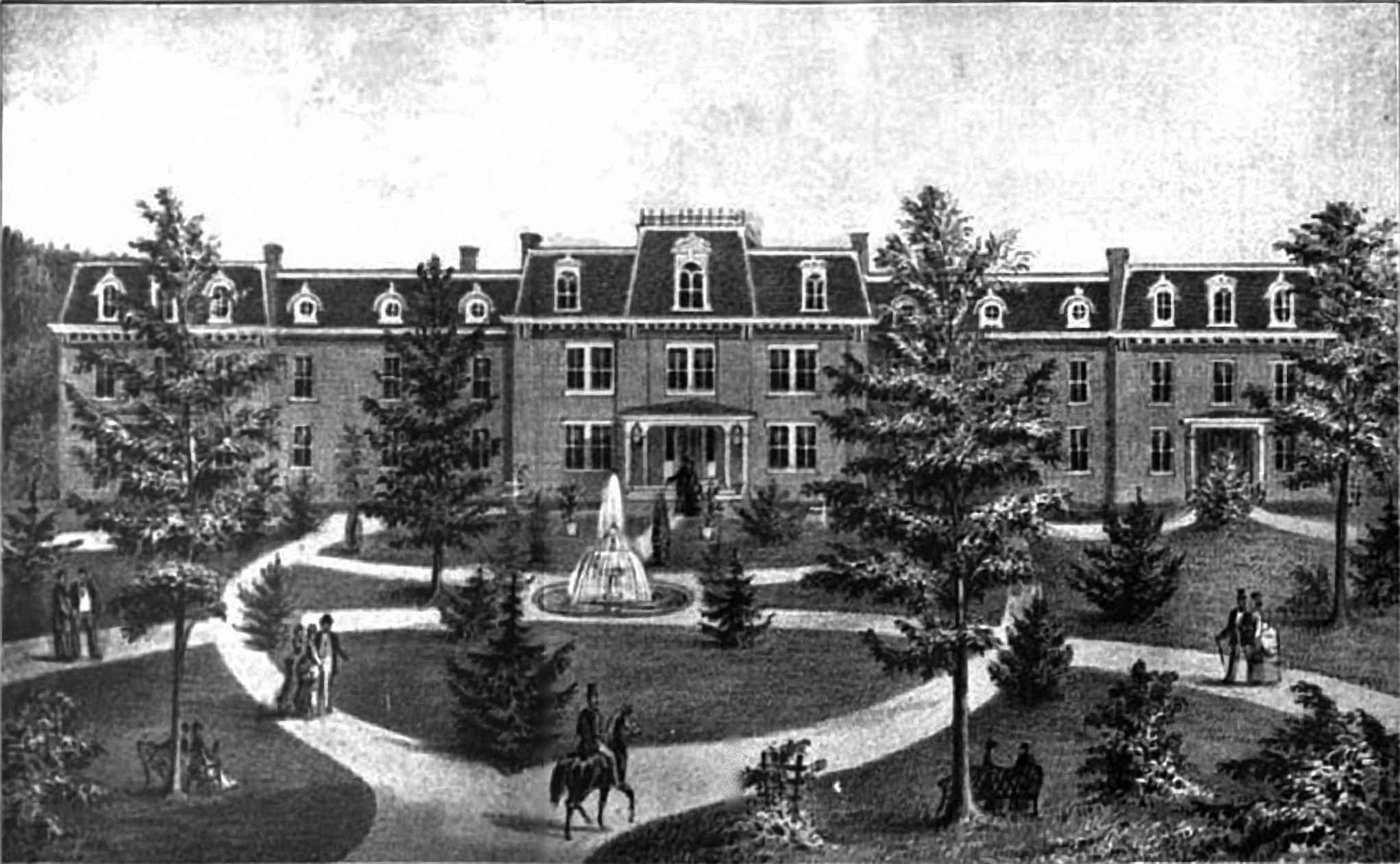
Administration Building of the West Virginia Schools for the Deaf and Blind in Romney, West Virginia, in 1880 during Covell's tenure as its principal.

In June–July 1874, Covell was selected by the Board of Regents of the West Virginia Schools for the Deaf and Blind in Romney, West Virginia to serve as the institution's principal, and he began his tenure there in August of that year. Upon his arrival, Covell found the schools "in a chaotic condition" with decreasing attendance, but the situation improved after Covell provided leadership, order, and a process of reorganization. Under his leadership, the West Virginia Schools for the Deaf and Blind experienced "unprecedented success" and its student body began to grow due to Covell's initiatives. Covell found that 12 out of West Virginia's 54 counties had no representatives at the schools, so he urged the Board of Regents to canvass the state for students eligible to attend the institution. The board approved Covell's recommendation, and the resulting investigation identified students in those counties, which validated Covell's request. By the schools' tenth anniversary in 1880, the West Virginia Schools for the Deaf and Blind's attendance reached 120, consisting of 87 "deaf-mute" and 33 blind students. At his death in 1887, the institution had grown from a student body of 60 pupils in 1874 to 130.

Among his other reforms, Covell undertook to modernize the facilities of the West Virginia Schools for the Deaf and Blind by urging the state to install gas lighting and to install plumbing for the purposes of providing tap water. In addition to the school's infrastructure, Covell overhauled the school's levels of comprehension in 1875 by introducing a classification system in which students were arranged in grades. Covell also introduced the tradition of publishing biennial reports, then annual reports, which have continued to be released every year since 1876. In 1877, at Covell's recommendation, the schools' board established the Department of Visible Speech in which deaf-mute students were instructed in the manner of articulation and lip reading.

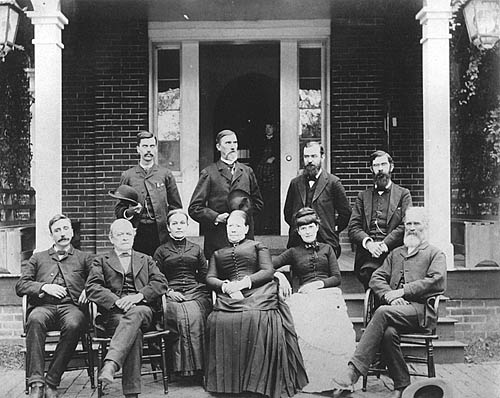
Faculty and staff at the West Virginia Schools for the Deaf and Blind in 1884. Standing left to right: Mr. Shaeffer, Principal John Collins Covell, Abraham D. Hays, and math professor E. L. Chapin. Seated left to right: school founder Howard Hille Johnson, J. B. McGann, Lulie Kern, Martha Clelland, Sarah Caruthers, and principal of the deaf school, H. H. Chidester.

As an educator, Covell was described as "an instructor of rare ability, being well-versed in literature, science, and the arts" and as "a gentleman of fine abilities and ripe experience". He had great personal influence on his students and took an interest in their religious well-being. Covell continued serving as principal of the West Virginia Schools for the Deaf and Blind until his death from stomach cancer on Saturday, June 4, 1887, in Romney. Known for his excellence as an executive and administrative officer, all his affairs were found by the president of the school's Board of Regents "to be finished, so that nothing remained to be done" on the day of his death.

Following his death, Covell was honored in 1888 at the National Conference of Superintendents and Principals of Institutions for Deaf Mutes in Jackson, Mississippi, by W. O. Connor, Principal of the Georgia School for the Deaf, who stated:

[W]e greatly deplore his [Covell's] loss to the Institution over which he presided with such universal acceptability; and that in his death we recognize the loss of a friend worthy of the fullest confidence, and an official of marked ability and adaptation to his duties, which he always performed with a faithfulness and efficiency unexcelled.

His obituary in The Churchman remarked of Covell:

[W]ith untiring zeal and fidelity, he has labored in the noble work of elevating and educating the deaf, dumb and the blind. He stood without an equal in methods entirely original.

== Personal life ==
Covell married on December 24, 1850, in Staunton, Virginia to Anita "Annie" E. Eskridge (June 18, 1810 – July 26, 1895). Covell is interred with his wife Annie at Indian Mound Cemetery in Romney. He and his wife had five children together, including two daughters:

Name	Birth date	Death date	Spouse
Mary Avery Covell Parsons	January 23, 1852	October 14, 1913	Married Garrett Williams Parsons, son of Col. Isaac Parsons and Susan Blue Parsons of Wappocomo, in Romney on November 12, 1878.
Annie Baldwin Covell Heiskell	June 7, 1859	April 13, 1938	Married David Hopkins Heiskell on June 15, 1886.

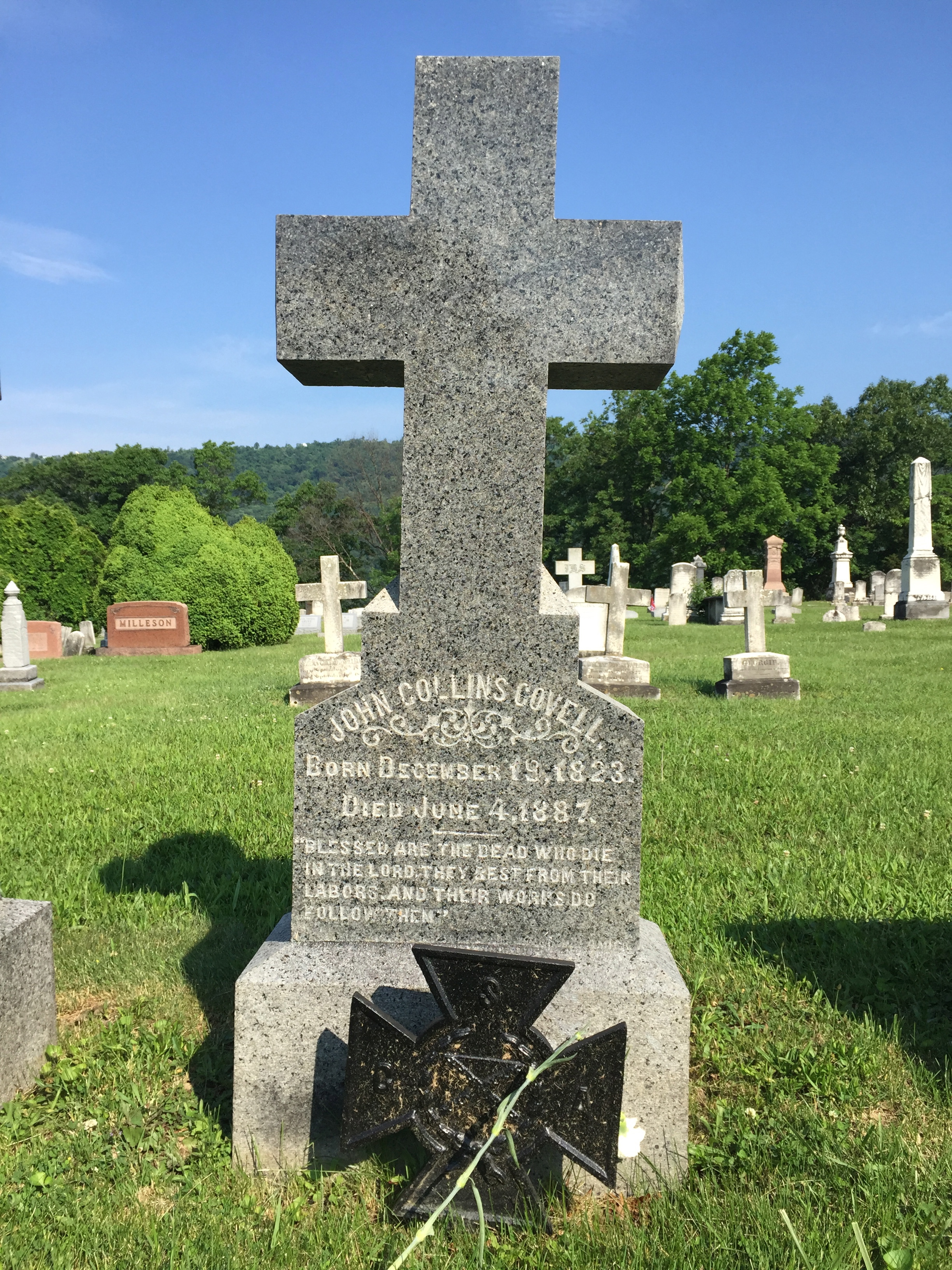
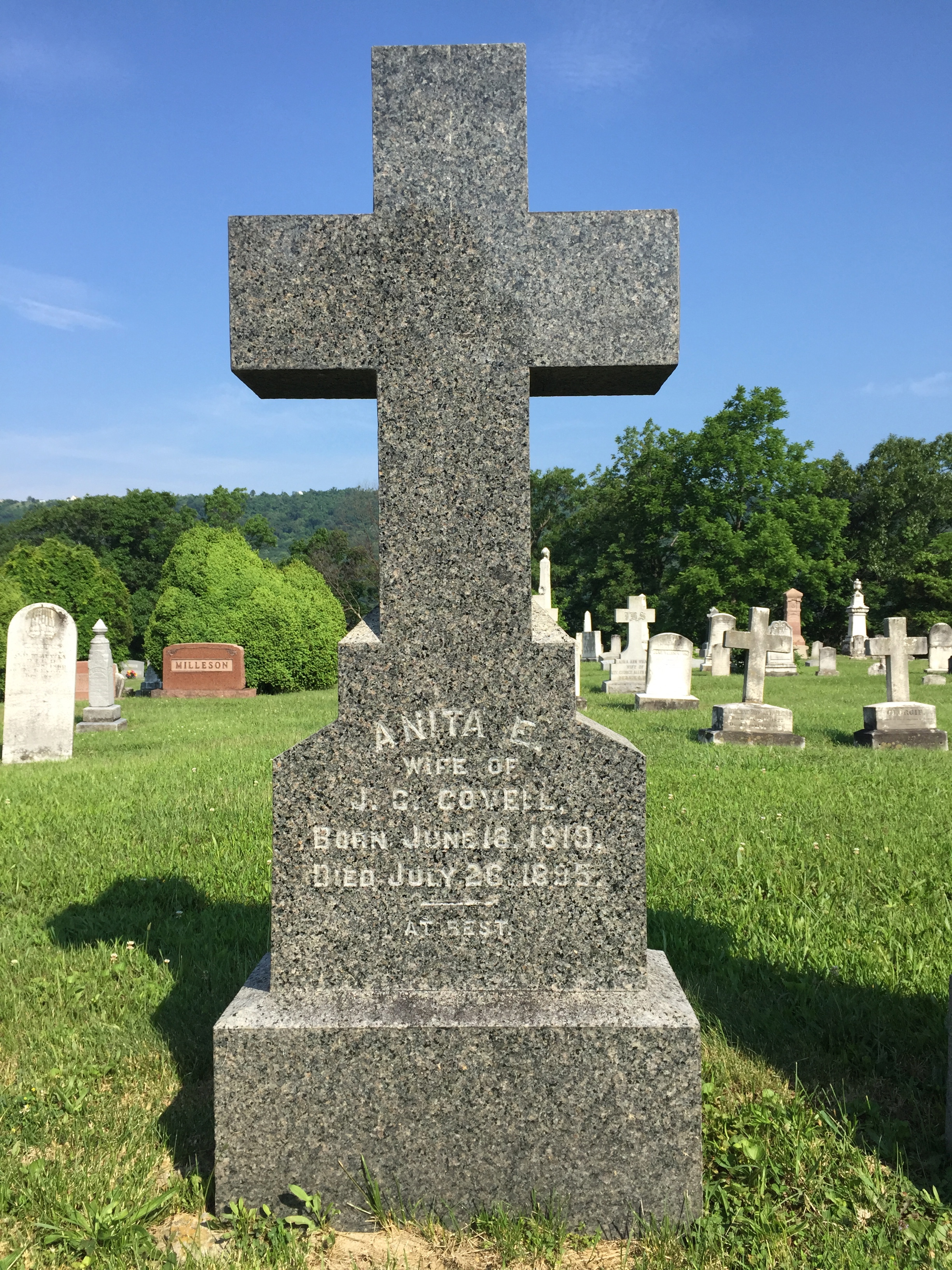
The gravestones of John Collins Covell (left) and his wife Anita "Annie" E. Eskridge Covell (right).

Covell was an active and prominent member of the Episcopal Diocese of West Virginia and belonged to Saint Stephen's Episcopal Church in Romney. He was appointed the first churchwarden of Saint Stephen's by Bishop of the Episcopal Diocese of West Virginia, George William Peterkin. Covell played an instrumental role in the construction of a church for Saint Stephen's in 1885 through his donation of property for the building site across the Northwestern Turnpike from the West Virginia Schools for the Deaf and Blind and through his financial contribution of the majority of the $1,800 USD construction cost. Covell's efforts were described in The Churchman as the "crowning work of his life." Prior to the church's construction, it is likely Covell that allowed Saint Stephen's to utilize the chapel at the West Virginia Schools for the Deaf and Blind to hold their services. In addition to his affiliation with the Episcopal Church, Covell was a Mason of "high standing" and a member of the Romney Literary Society.

== Bibliography ==
- Atkinson, George Wesley; Gibbens, Alvaro Franklin (1890). Prominent Men of West Virginia: Biographical Sketches of Representative Men in Every Honorable Vocation, Including Politics, the Law, Theology, Medicine, Education, Finance, Journalism, Trade, Commerce and Agriculture. Wheeling, West Virginia: W. L. Callin. OCLC 3886825 – via Internet Archive.
- Bass, Robert Aumon (1949). History of the Education of the Deaf in Virginia. Staunton, Virginia: Virginia School for the Deaf and the Blind. OCLC 3107726. Archived from the original on November 2, 2013 – via Google Books.
- Baynton, Douglas C. (1998). Forbidden Signs: American Culture and the Campaign Against Sign Language. Chicago: University of Chicago Press. ISBN 978-0-226-03964-0. OCLC 868029131. Archived from the original on June 26, 2014 – via Google Books.
- Covell, John Collins (1870). The Nobility, Dignity, and Antiquity of the Sign Language. Archived from the original on January 26, 2017 – via Google Books.
- Episcopal Diocese of Connecticut (1850). Journal of the Annual Convention of the Protestant Episcopal Church in the Diocese of Connecticut, Volumes 1841-1850. Hartford, Connecticut: Stanlet & Chapin, Printers. OCLC 659330638. Archived from the original on October 31, 2013 – via Google Books.
- MacCabe, Virginia Parsons (1913). Parsons' Family History and Record. Decatur, Illinois: Charles W. Nickey. OCLC 8590919 – via Internet Archive.
- Maxwell, Hu; Swisher, Howard Llewellyn (1897). History of Hampshire County, West Virginia From Its Earliest Settlement to the Present. Morgantown, West Virginia: A. Brown Boughner, Printer. OCLC 680931891. OL 23304577M.
- National Conference of Superintendents and Principals of Institutions for Deaf Mutes (1888). Proceedings of the Gallaudet Sixth National Conference of Superintendents and Principals of Institutions for Deaf Mutes Held at Mississippi Institution, Jackson, Mississippi, April 14-17, 1888. Jackson, Mississippi: Clarion-Ledger Printing Establishment. OCLC 30083499. Archived from the original on June 26, 2014 – via Google Books.
- Peterkin, George W. (1902). A History and Record of the Protestant Episcopal Church in the Diocese of West Virginia, and Before the Formation of the Diocese in 1878, in the Territory Now Known as the State of West Virginia. Charleston, West Virginia: The Tribune Company, Printers. OCLC 697783330. Archived from the original on November 3, 2013 – via Google Books.
- United States Bureau of Education (1884). Report of the Commissioner of Education for the Year 1882-1883. Washington, D.C.: United States Government Printing Office. OCLC 2252059. Archived from the original on October 29, 2013 – via Google Books.
- United States Congress (1882). The Executive Documents of the House of Representatives for the First Session of the Forty-Seventh Congress, 1881-82, in 26 Volumes. Volume 12 - Education, No. 1, Part 5, Volume 4. Washington, D.C.: United States Government Printing Office. OCLC 429946404. Archived from the original on June 26, 2014 – via Google Books.
- Virginia General Assembly (1865). Annual Reports of Officers, Boards and Institutions of the Commonwealth of Virginia. Richmond, Virginia: Commonwealth of Virginia. OCLC 892805149. Archived from the original on October 31, 2013 – via Google Books.
- Whitehill, A. R.; United States Bureau of Education (1902). United States Bureau of Education, Circular of Information No. 1, 1902. Number 30: History of Education in West Virginia. Washington, D.C.: United States Government Printing Office. OCLC 2860098. Archived from the original on November 16, 2013 – via Google Books.

Academic offices
Preceded by Jean Merillat	Principal of the Virginia School for the Deaf and Blind; 1862 – 1872	Succeeded by Charles D. McCoy
Preceded by Leveus Eddy	Principal of the West Virginia Schools for the Deaf and Blind; 1874 – 1887	Succeeded by Henry Bell Gilkeson
