= Henry Wirtz Thomas =

American politician

12th Lieutenant Governor of Virginia
- In office March 1, 1875 – January 1, 1878
- Governor: James L. Kemper
- Preceded by: Robert E. Withers
- Succeeded by: James A. Walker

President pro tempore of the Senate of Virginia
- In office December 6, 1871 – March 1, 1875
- Preceded by: Joseph A. Waddell
- Succeeded by: William D. Quesenberry

Member of the Virginia Senate
- In office December 6, 1871 – March 1, 1875
- Preceded by: Edgar Snowden Jr.
- Succeeded by: Hierome O. Claughton
- In office December 2, 1850 – September 7, 1863
- Preceded by: Asa Rogers
- Succeeded by: William H. Dulany

Member of the Virginia House of Delegates from Fairfax County
- In office 1847–1848
- In office 1841–1842

Personal details
- Born: Henry Wirtz Thomas; October 12, 1812 Leesburg, Virginia, U.S.
- Died: June 22, 1890 (aged 77) Fairfax City, Virginia, U.S.
- Party: Whig; Republican
- Spouse: Julia Jackson Thomas
- Children: 1

Henry Wirtz Thomas (October 20, 1812 – June 22, 1890), a Republican politician, served as the 12th Lieutenant Governor of Virginia from 1875 to 1878 under Governor James L. Kemper.

== Early life and education ==
Henry W. Thomas was born in Leesburg, Virginia in 1812. He attended college in District of Columbia. He studied law and became a lawyer. In 1833, he moved to Fairfax Court House. He was commissioned a Major in the Virginia Militia in 1837.

== Politics ==
Thomas was Virginia state legislator, was a Confederate States of America Senator, and Lieutenant Governor of Virginia.

At the age of 26, he was elected Fairfax County Commonwealth's Attorney in 1838. He was a member of the Virginia House of Delegates from 1841 to 1842 and again from 1847 to 1848. He continued his legislative service to the Commonwealth in the Senate of Virginia, serving from 1850 to 1863 and from 1872 to 1875. In 1875, he was elected Lt. Governor. He also served as a Judge on the Fairfax County Circuit Court from 1866 until shortly before his death.

== Personal life ==
Thomas was married to Julia M. Jackson, and they had a daughter named Nannie.

== Death ==
Thomas died at his home in Fairfax on June 23, 1890. He is buried in Fairfax City Cemetery in Fairfax, Virginia.

Political offices
Preceded by Robert E. Withers	Lieutenant Governor of Virginia; 1875–1878	Succeeded by James A. Walker
