= Virginia School for the Deaf, Blind and Multi-Disabled at Hampton =

Defunct school in Virginia, United States

Coordinates: 37°00′N 76°24′W

Location
- 700 Shell Road; Hampton, Virginia; United States

Information
- Established: 1909
- Closed: 2008
- Enrollment: 40 (2008)
- Capacity: 320 (peak enrollment)

Virginia School for the Deaf, Blind and Multi-Disabled at Hampton (VSDBM-H), also known as the Virginia School for the Deaf and the Blind-Hampton Campus (VSDB-Hampton) was a school for deaf and blind children in Hampton, Virginia. It was operated by the Commonwealth of Virginia.

== History ==
The Virginia General Assembly passed a law in 1906 to establish the school. It opened in 1909 as Virginia State School for Colored Deaf and Blind Children, serving as the school for black deaf and blind children for the state, under de jure educational segregation in the United States. The school's founder and first superintendent was William C. Ritter, a graduate of the Virginia School for the Deaf and the Blind (VSDB) in Staunton and president of the Virginia Association of the Deaf. In 1940, William Whitehead was appointed as the school's first Black superintendent. Whitehead served for twenty years, overseeing significant improvements to the quality and variety of instruction offered, and an increase in extracurricular activities.

In 1970, it had 320 students, its peak enrollment.

In the early 1970s the U.S. Department of Health, Education, and Welfare (HEW) required the state of Virginia to come up with a plan to desegregate VSDBM-H and the state school for white students in Staunton, Virginia, the Virginia School for the Deaf and Blind (VSDB). The Commonwealth developed a plan to do so in 1974, which was deemed acceptable by HEW. In 1975 both Staunton and Hampton sites had schools for the deaf and blind, but all blind high school students attended Hampton while all deaf high school students attended Staunton. In 1978 the state unveiled a $1.8 million capital improvement plan for the Hampton campus.

The 1975 Individuals with Disabilities Education Act required that local school districts have the capacity to educate all students in their boundaries, so the demand for the state deaf/blind schools declined. In 1983 VSDBM had 200 students. The school considered establishing a high school for the deaf but determined only 15 students would be served and the cost would be $700,000, so this was not done. The building intended for it, in 1983, was half empty.

Beginning in 1996 the Hampton City Schools school district began leasing space in VSDBM-H. By 2003 enrollment declined to the point where the school district was leasing two buildings. with the charter school Hampton Harbour Academy and Head Start operations in Bradford Hall and William Whitehead Hall, respectively. The campus had a value of $3.9 million with $2.5 million of it being the land.

In 2003 there was a plan being developed on possibly merging it with VSDB. The Virginia General Assembly approved the consolidation plan in 2006 and the Virginia Board of Education voted to close the school in 2008. At the time the school had 40 students. Most of them were either graduating or going to the Virginia School for the Deaf and Blind, with 14 doing neither. On July 1, 2009, the facility became excess property for the state; a 2008 Virginia Legislature session decreed that until that point, state funds could not be spent to renovate VSDB.

Phenix Industrial LLC, a real estate company, bought 23 acres (9.3 ha) of the former property for $908,000.

== Campus ==
The campus, located at 700 Shell Road near Hampton’s boarder with Newport News had 72 acres (29 ha) of space. By 2003 many of the buildings dated from the 1950s, replacing earlier historic buildings that were torn down. The 1950s buildings, made of brick, had one or two stories. In 2003 the dormitories were about 70% full.

== Student body ==
In 1983 25 students from Newport News attended VSDBM as day students, and of the 30 students from Hampton at state-operated schools for blind/deaf, most of them were day students at VSDBM.
