= Edgar Snowden Sr. =

American politician

Edgar Snowden

Member of the Virginia House of Delegates from Alexandria
- In office 1846–1853

Mayor of Alexandria, D.C.
- In office 1840-1843
- Preceded by: Bernard Hooe Jr.
- Succeeded by: Robert G. Violett

Personal details
- Born: December 21, 1810
- Died: September 24, 1875 (aged 64) Alexandria, Virginia, U.S.
- Occupation: Lawyer, publisher, politician

Edgar Snowden Sr. (December 21, 1810 – September 24, 1875) was an American newspaperman and politician from Virginia who served as mayor of Alexandria, D.C. and represented Alexandria in the Virginia House of Delegates.

== Early life and family ==
Edgar Snowden was born on December 21, 1810. Snowden attended law school and briefly worked as an attorney. He married Louisa Grymes (1814 –1897) and they had eleven children, including Edgar Snowden Jr., a member of the Virginia Senate.

== Political career ==
Snowden was active in local politics in Alexandria, and served on the city's Common Council for five years. From 1840 to 1843, Snowden served as mayor of Alexandria. During his time as mayor, he advocated for the retrocession of Alexandria to Virginia, which was approved in 1846.

After the retrocession of the City of Alexandria and Alexandria County back to Virginia, Snowden served several terms as Alexandria's representative in the Virginia House of Delegates from 1846 to 1853. In 1850, Snowden was elected to serve as a representative to the Virginia Constitutional Convention.

Snowden was pro-slavery and threatened abolitionist publishers William Lloyd Garrison and Arthur Tappan with lynching should they visit Alexandria.

In 1853, Snowden was the Whig party nominee for the U.S. House of Representatives for Virginia's 7th congressional district, but was defeated by William "Extra-Billy" Smith.

In 1857, Snowden ran unsuccessfully for Governor of Virginia against incumbent Extra-Billy Smith.

== Publisher ==
After his father's Samuel Snowden's death, Snowden took over the role of publisher and editor of his newspaper, the Alexandria Gazette. The newspaper served as the dominant newspaper in Alexandria during the period, and advanced the views of the Whig Party. In addition to printing the Gazette, Snowden ran a printing office business.

During the American Civil War, Snowden used his periodical, The Local News, to promote the cause of the Confederacy. As such, his newspaper became a target for attacks during the war. His printing plant was seized by Union officers, property was demolished and looted, and the building was destroyed in a fire and later rebuilt. In 1864, Snowden was arrested by military authorities and detained for a brief period.

Snowden's other business holdings included the Fauquier and Alexandria Turnpike Company and the Alexandria Canal.

== Death ==
Snowden died on September 24, 1875, at the age of 64. He is buried at the Trinity United Methodist Church cemetery in Alexandria.
