= William D. Quesenberry =

American politician

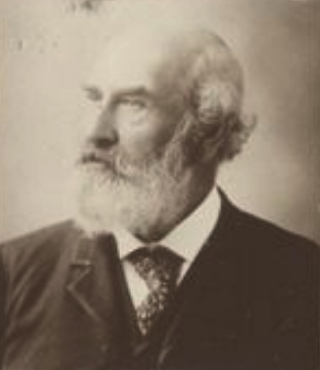
- Official portrait, 1897

Member of the Virginia House of Delegates from Caroline County
- In office December 1, 1897 – December 6, 1899
- Preceded by: W. L. Blanton
- Succeeded by: Samuel E. Pitts

President pro tempore of the Virginia Senate
- In office March 1, 1875 – December 3, 1879
- Preceded by: Henry W. Thomas
- Succeeded by: Wyatt M. Elliott

Member of the Virginia Senate
- In office December 6, 1871 – December 3, 1879
- Succeeded by: Joseph A. Wingfield
- Constituency: Hanover and Caroline
- In office 1860 – December 4, 1865
- Preceded by: F. W. Coleman
- Constituency: Caroline and Spotsylvania

Personal details
- Born: March 10, 1828
- Died: December 8, 1901 (aged 73) Milford, Virginia, U.S.
- Party: Democratic

Military service
- Allegiance: Confederate States
- Branch/service: Confederate States Army
- Years of service: 1861–1865
- Rank: Captain
- Unit: 30th Virginia Infantry
- Battles/wars: American Civil War

William DeJarnette Quesenberry (March 10, 1828 – December 8, 1901) was a Democratic politician who served as a member of the Virginia Senate, eventually rising to become president pro tempore of that body. He later served one term in the Virginia House of Delegates.

Senate of Virginia
Preceded by Henry W. Thomas	President pro tempore of the Virginia Senate; 1875–1879	Succeeded by Wyatt M. Elliott
