= Alexandria Gazette =

The Alexandria Gazette was a succession of newspapers based in Alexandria, Virginia, United States. The newspaper served as the dominant newspaper in Alexandria from 1834 to 1974. It served as a voice to the Whig Party and later the Democratic Party.

The predecessor to the Gazette was established on February 5, 1784, by George Richards & Company as the Virginia Journal. The Alexandria Gazette building on Prince Street was burned during the Civil War by rioting federal troops. It was rebuilt by the publisher and editor Edgar Snowden after the war. The newspaper was subsequently located at 317 King Street.

A successor to the earlier iterations ran as a daily newspaper from 1834 to 1974. Its first publisher was Edgar Snowden (1810–1875), who represented Alexandria in the Virginia House of Delegates several times as well as unsuccessfully run for Governor of Virginia (losing to Extra-Billy Smith). Snowden was pro-slavery and threatened abolitionist publishers William Lloyd Garrison and Arthur Tappan with lynching should they visit Alexandria.

During the first half of the 20th century U.S. Representative Charles Creighton Carlin and his son Charles Creighton Carlin Jr. edited the paper.

== In popular culture ==
The paper is prominently shown in Alfred Hitchcock's 1969 film Topaz.
