= WVXS =

Classic rock radio station in Romney, West Virginia

- Romney, West Virginia; United States
- Broadcast area: Hampshire County, West Virginia; Mineral County, West Virginia
- Frequency: 104.1 MHz
- Branding: Rock 104

Programming
- Format: Mainstream rock

Ownership
- Owner: South Branch Career and Technical Center

History
- First air date: March 30, 1973
- Former call signs: WJGF (1973–2000); WVSB (2000–2018)

Technical information
- Licensing authority: FCC
- Facility ID: 71665
- Class: A
- ERP: 1,050 watts
- HAAT: 238 meters (781 ft)
- Transmitter coordinates: 39°18′57.0″N 78°43′07.0″W

Links
- Public license information: Public file; LMS
- Webcast: WVXS Webstream

WVXS is a Mainstream Rock formatted broadcast radio station licensed to Romney, West Virginia, United States, serving Hampshire and Mineral counties in West Virginia. WVXS is owned and operated by South Branch Career and Technical Center.

== Change in ownership ==
George Park Jr., the "longtime engineer and teacher" of the West Virginia Schools for the Deaf and Blind's broadcasting education class filed for retirement after 47 years with the school. The school donated the station to the South Branch Career and Technical Center, located in nearby Petersburg, West Virginia. The school and Park cited "declining student interest and increasing standards" as other reasons for the station's donation. The station rebranded as "104.1 The Maverick" and later "Maverick Country 104". South Branch Career and Technical Center changed the station's callsign on October 19, 2018, to WVXS from its previous WVSB, which had stood for "West Virginia School for the Deaf and Blind".
