= Virginia School for the Deaf and the Blind =

Public school in Virginia, United States

- Virginia School for the Deaf and Blind
- U.S. National Register of Historic Places
- Virginia Landmarks Register
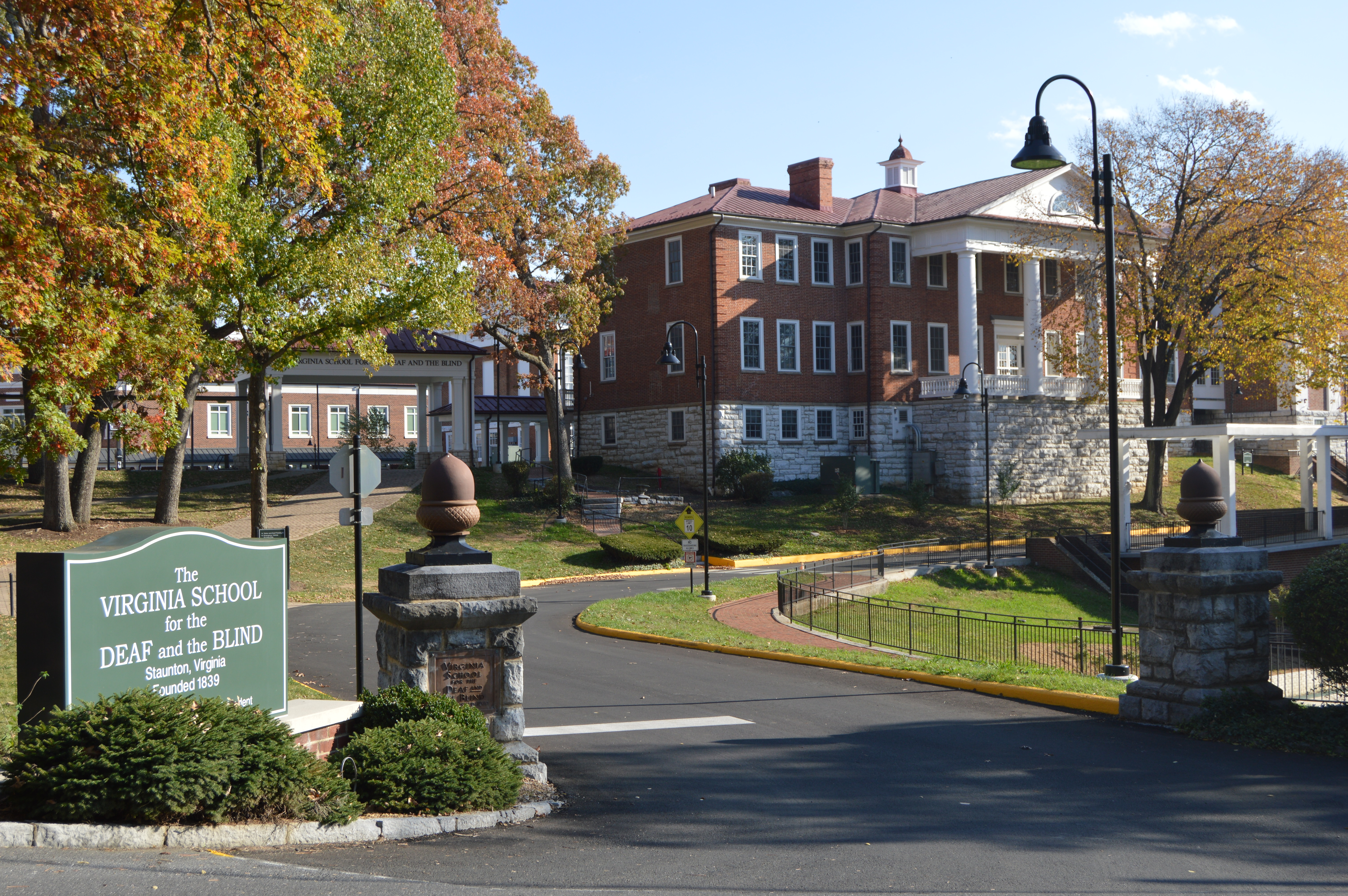
- Entrance to the school

- Location within Virginia Location within the United States
- Location: E. Beverley St. and Pleasant Ter., Staunton, Virginia
- Coordinates: 38°9′1.6″N 79°3′50.4″W
- Area: 100 acres (40 ha)
- Built: 1846
- Built by: William Donoho
- Architect: Robert Cary Long Jr.
- NRHP reference No.: 69000361
- VLR No.: 132-0008

Significant dates
- Added to NRHP: November 12, 1969
- Designated VLR: September 9, 1969

The Virginia School for the Deaf and the Blind, located in Staunton, Virginia, United States, is an institution for educating deaf and blind children, first established in 1839 by an act of the Virginia General Assembly. The school accepts children aged between 2 and 22 and provides residential accommodation for those students aged 5 and over who live outside a 35-mile (56 km) radius of the school

== History ==
The Virginia Institution for the Deaf, Dumb and Blind, as it was originally named, was first opened in Staunton by the State of Virginia in 1839. It was fully co-educational from the time of its founding although it only accepted white students. The first superintendent was Joseph D. Tyler, who was paid a salary of $1200 per year. The first teacher hired was named Job Turner, who served the school for 40 years. J. C. M. Merrillat was a native of Bordeaux, France, who served as the first principal of the Blind Department. He became superintendent of both the Deaf and Blind departments in 1852. His nearby residence, the J. C. M. Merrillat House, was added to the National Register of Historic Places in 1982.

During the American Civil War, the school's Main Hall was used as a hospital by Confederate troops, and several staff members served as doctors or nurses. The school now houses a Deaf History Museum on its grounds. Sometime after the war, Thomas Davis Ranson served as the school director.

In the late 1960s the school had 550 students. At the time there were more prospective students than space, and hence there was a waiting list.

In the early 1970s the U.S. Department of Health, Education, and Welfare (HEW) required the state of Virginia to come up with a plan to desegregate VSDB and the state school for black deaf and blind students in Hampton, Virginia, the Virginia School for the Deaf, Blind and Multi-Disabled at Hampton. The Commonwealth developed a plan to do so in 1974, which was deemed acceptable by HEW. In 1975 both Staunton and Hampton sites had schools for the deaf and blind, but all blind high school students attended Hampton while all deaf high school students attended Staunton. In 1978 the state unveiled a $1.8 million capital improvement plan for the Hampton campus.

The 1975 Individuals with Disabilities Education Act required that local school districts have the capacity to educate all students in their boundaries, so the demand for the state deaf/blind schools declined. By 1983 there were about 300 students.

In June 2008, the two deaf/blind schools were consolidated into one school with Staunton chosen as the site.

In 2009, the General Assembly declared the school independent of the Virginia Department of Education with its own board of visitors.

== Blind Department ==
The Blind Department uses a range of technology to ensure students academic and social development. It teaches the reading and writing of Braille, as well as life and social skills, self-advocacy and mobility skills, alongside traditional academic subjects

All staff in the department are specifically trained and licensed by the Virginia Department of Education or other licensing boards tailored to the specific demands of the students.

A Summer Enrichment Program is offered to students with varying levels of vision loss. This focuses on Reading and Study Skills, Mathematics and Money Management, Independent Living Skills and Everyday Technology/Signatures. The mornings are spent on these practical and academic areas, while the afternoons are dedicated to enrichment activities.

== Deaf Department ==
The Deaf Department offers a range of vocational and academic subjects to its pupils in order to prepare them for life after the school. It organises a number of work experience placements in the community, giving students specific training in areas of work in which they might be interested.

Typical academic subjects including Math, English, U.S. History, World History, Science and Physical Education are offered for all ages alongside areas more tailored to the students' needs, such as Life Management Skills and Motor Development.

A number of professionals are available at the school to provide support for the academic and vocational programs. A Communication Skills Therapist and Behavioral Management Specialist help students' development and an Audiologist is on hand to assess and monitor students' hearing.

== Parent/Infant Outreach Program ==
A free program is offered by the school to families raising children who are deaf, hard-of-hearing, blind, low-vision or deaf-blind. This includes American Sign Language classes, socialising and networking opportunities and home-based services designed to support and educate families while allowing them some independence.

== Sport ==
The school has an active athletics department and offers a range of sports including soccer, girls' volleyball, boys' and girls' basketball, goalball and track. The Deaf Department teams, known as the Cardinals, compete in the Mason-Dixon Schools for the Deaf Athletic Association. The Blind Department teams, the Chiefs, compete in the Eastern Athletic Association of the Blind.

The school has a Hall of Fame, founded in 1974 by former employee, Rocco DeVito. Its first member was T. Carlton Lewellyn, the first Physical Education director at the school

The Cardinals were Mason-Dixon Basketball Tournament Champions in the 1959, 1964 and 1970 seasons. Their football team was undefeated in the 1939, 1954 and 1969 seasons.

== Alumni ==
The school has a very active alumni association, re-founded around 1955. Many alumni are now among the teaching and support staff at the school and an alumni newsletter, the Little Acorn, is produced and distributed four times a year.

Notable alumni include:

- C. Clifton Virts (1910–1985), member of the Maryland House of Delegates

== Campus ==
The school, located in a residential area, has 73 acres (30 ha) of land. In 2003, the school had 28 buildings, with the newest being the 1991-built Abernathy Natatorium. The majority of the buildings were built in the 1800s. The Virginia Department of the Visually Handicapped rented portions of an unused dormitory building, Watts Hall. As of 1983 the school's capacity in terms of its classrooms and its dormitories is 525.
