= Joshua Soule Zimmerman =

American politician

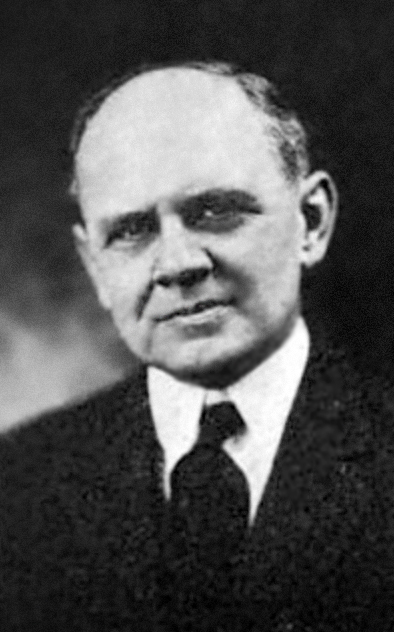
- Zimmerman during his tenure in the West Virginia House of Delegates

Member of the West Virginia House of Delegates from the Hampshire County district
- In office 1921–1924
- Preceded by: James Sloan Kuykendall
- Succeeded by: Henry Washington Campbell, Jr.

Prosecuting Attorney for Hampshire County
- In office 1900–1910
- Preceded by: William B. Cornwell

Personal details
- Born: January 16, 1874 near La Plata, Maryland, U.S.
- Died: September 2, 1962 (aged 88) Williamsport, Maryland, United States
- Resting place: Indian Mound Cemetery, Romney, West Virginia, U.S.
- Party: Democratic Party
- Spouse: Kitty Campbell Vance
- Children: 4
- Education: Roanoke College; Randolph–Macon College (A.B.); Columbian University Law School (LL. B.)
- Profession: lawyer, politician, and orchardist

Joshua Soule Zimmerman (January 16, 1874 – September 2, 1962) was an American lawyer, politician, and orchardist in the U.S. state of West Virginia. In the early years of the 20th century, Zimmerman served as the Prosecuting Attorney for Hampshire County and as a Democratic member of the West Virginia House of Delegates.

Zimmerman was born in La Plata to Reverend George Henry Zimmerman, a Methodist pastor and church administrator. He began his post-secondary education at Roanoke College and received a Bachelor of Arts degree from Randolph–Macon College in 1892. He worked as a clerk in the United States Census Office in Washington, D.C., and earned a Bachelor of Laws degree in 1896 from Columbian University Law School. Following his graduation, Zimmerman opened a law office in Romney, West Virginia, in July 1896 and engaged in the practice of law there. He provided legal services to a number of companies and organizations including Capon Valley Bank, Hampshire County's Legal Advisory Board, the Hampshire County Food Administration, and Hampshire County orchard owners. Zimmerman was the secretary for the Winchester and Western Railroad.

While serving in the West Virginia House of Delegates, Zimmerman was appointed by West Virginia Governor John Jacob Cornwell to serve on a West Virginia Legislature select committee charged with drafting a road transportation bill known as the West Virginia State Road Law. He was again appointed by Governor Cornwell to serve on a similar select committee following the ratification of the "Good Roads Amendment" of the Constitution of West Virginia in 1920. In addition to serving in the West Virginia House of Delegates, Zimmerman was the chairman of the Hampshire County Democratic Party Committee and a member of the Second District Congressional Committee; he also participated in judicial, senatorial, and state conventions. Zimmerman played an active role in the commercial apple orchard industry of Hampshire County, and he operated at least three commercial orchards there.

== Early life and family ==
Joshua Soule Zimmerman was born on January 16, 1874, near La Plata in Charles County, Maryland, at the ancestral home of his mother, Henrietta A. Rowe Zimmerman. His father was Reverend George Henry Zimmerman, a Methodist pastor and church administrator whose family originated from an estate in Baltimore County near Baltimore, Maryland. Zimmerman's father presided over the Moorefield district of the Methodist Episcopal Church, South (1894–1898). Zimmerman had two brothers: Edgar Rowe Zimmerman of Ruxton, Maryland, and George Henry Zimmerman of Whitesburg, Kentucky.

The pastoral profession of Zimmerman's father caused his family to relocate to a number of towns throughout Maryland, Virginia, and West Virginia. Zimmerman spent the majority of his youth and received his early education in Woodstock and Salem, Virginia. His father was then transferred to Romney, West Virginia, to preside over the Moorefield district of the Methodist Episcopal Church, South.

== Education ==
Zimmerman attended Roanoke College in Salem, Virginia, for two sessions from 1885 to 1886. In 1888, he began attending Randolph–Macon College in Ashland, Virginia, where he graduated with a Bachelor of Arts degree in 1892. Following his graduation, Zimmerman worked briefly as a tutor on a plantation and operated a school at Shelby, Mississippi.

In 1893, Zimmerman accepted the position of a clerk in the United States Census Office in Washington, D.C., during the second administration of President Grover Cleveland. He remained at the office through the completion of work associated with the 1890 United States census. During his three years serving in the United States Census Office, Zimmerman completed night courses in jurisprudence at Columbian University Law School, and he graduated from the institution with a Bachelor of Laws degree in 1896. While attending Columbian University, Zimmerman also served as editor of the 1896 Class Book and resided at 915 I Street, Northwest near Mount Vernon Square.

Zimmerman was a member of the Phi Delta Theta social fraternity and of the Phi Delta Phi legal honor society. He was later made a Golden Legionnaire of the Phi Delta Theta fraternity. While attending the Columbian University, Zimmerman was a member of the law school's debating society.

== Law career ==
Following his graduation from Columbian University Law School, Zimmerman opened his law office in Romney, West Virginia, in July 1896 and began engaging in the practice of law there. His first legal case argued before the Hampshire County Circuit Court was West Virginia v. Smith, in which his client was charged with "breaking and entering with intent to commit larceny". Zimmerman lost this case. In Hu Maxwell and Howard Llewellyn Swisher's History of Hampshire County, West Virginia: From Its Earliest Settlement to the Present (1897), Zimmerman was described as "a young man" who had "made his success at the bar of Hampshire". Zimmerman's law practice expanded, and he began arguing cases in adjoining West Virginia county courts and in both the West Virginia state and United States federal courts.

Only seven years after starting his law practice, Zimmerman was appointed to fill the unexpired term of Prosecuting Attorney for Hampshire County, William B. Cornwell, who had resigned from the position. Zimmerman was subsequently reelected twice to the position, and he served as Hampshire County's prosecuting attorney from 1900 until 1910 (a total of nine years and three months). Zimmerman also served as one of three chancery commissioners for Hampshire County, during which he served with Christian Streit White, Robert White, and James Sloan Kuykendall. He was a member of the West Virginia Bar Association.

Zimmerman was the lawyer for the Capon Valley Bank, headquartered in Wardensville, West Virginia, and provided his legal services to secure the bank's incorporation. During World War I, Zimmerman served as a member of Hampshire County's Legal Advisory Board and was the lawyer for the County Food Administration. Following the outbreak of World War I, Zimmerman registered for the draft during the registration for men aged 18 through 45 under the Selective Service Act of 1917. After the Winchester and Western Railroad Company received its charter on August 31, 1916, to build and operate a rail line connecting Wardensville and the Lost River valley of West Virginia to the Baltimore and Ohio Railroad and the Cumberland Valley Railroad at Winchester, Virginia, Zimmerman served as the company's secretary.

== Political career ==
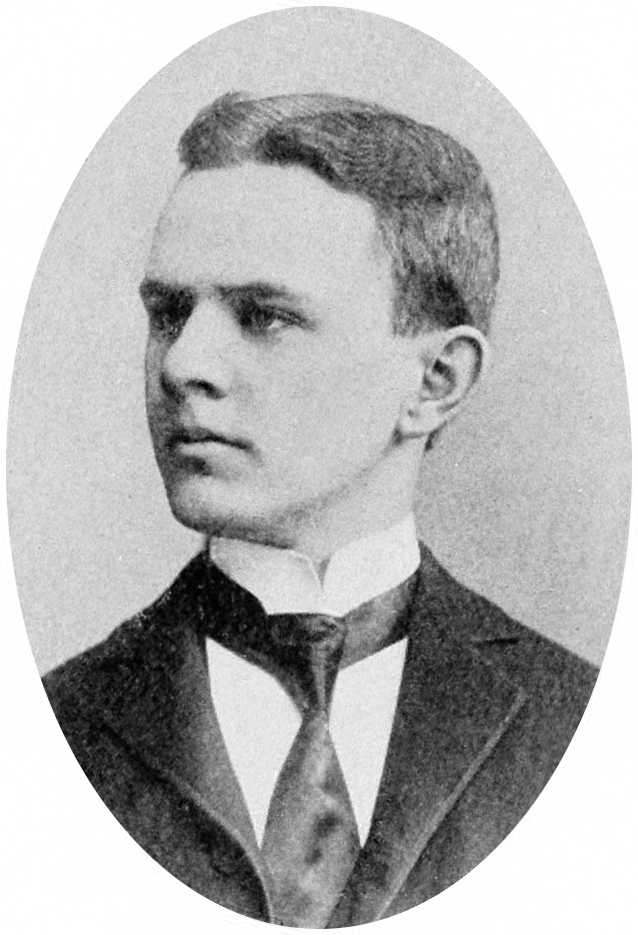
Portrait of Joshua Soule Zimmerman as a young lawyer, prior to 1897

Zimmerman became a prominent leader within the Democratic Party in Hampshire County, which was the dominant political party in the county. At various times, Zimmerman served as the chairman of the Hampshire County Democratic Party Committee, a member of the Second District Congressional Committee, and attended judicial, senatorial, and state conventions.

=== West Virginia House of Delegates ===
Zimmerman was nominated as the Democratic Party candidate for a seat representing Hampshire County in the West Virginia House of Delegates in 1920. He won the seat against Republican Party candidate C. W. Rogers in the November 1920 general election and subsequently served as a member of the West Virginia House of Delegates from 1921 to 1924. Following his election, Zimmerman was made the Democratic Party's minority floor leader in the West Virginia House of Delegates.

Zimmerman was appointed by West Virginia Governor John Jacob Cornwell to serve on a West Virginia Legislature select committee charged with drafting a road transportation bill under West Virginia Senate Joint Resolution No. 21 of May 21, 1919, known as the West Virginia State Road Law. The new West Virginia State Road Law became necessary following the authorization of a 50 million USD bond issue during the 1920 general election. Zimmerman was again appointed by Governor Cornwell to serve on a similar select committee following the ratification of the "Good Roads Amendment" of the Constitution of West Virginia in 1920.

During the 1921 legislative session, Zimmerman was assigned to the Judiciary, Roads, and Game and Fish committees. Also during the 1921 legislative session, he sponsored the following bills:

- H.B. 274 (Ch. 158), which gave county courts the authority to impose a "special building levy" not to exceed 30 cents for the purpose of completing the construction or repair of county courthouses.
- H.B. 392 (Ch. 49), which provided for the establishment of a county high school for Hampshire County and authorized the Hampshire County Board of Education to impose a levy not to exceed 30 cents for three years to construct and maintain the high school.

During the 1923 session, Zimmerman was majority floor leader. He also served on the standing committees of the Judiciary, Humane Institutions and Public Buildings, Railroads, Game and Fish, Redistricting, and Rules. Throughout his tenure in the West Virginia House of Delegates, Zimmerman supported legislation that strictly enforced prohibition.

== Agricultural pursuits ==
Zimmerman played an active role in the commercial apple orchard industry of Hampshire County, in which he was responsible for the promotion of several of the county's orchard companies, served as an officer and legal advisor to orchard companies, and owned 150 acres (0.61 km^{2}) of his own commercial apple orchards. In November 1906, Zimmerman, Henry Bell Gilkeson, R. W. Dailey, Jr., and P. J. Ruckman were incorporators of the Mill Mountain Orchard Company, which operated orchards along the top of Mill Creek Mountain west of Romney. According to the 1919 Census of the Commercial Apple Orchards in West Virginia published by the West Virginia Department of Agriculture, Zimmerman was engaged in the management of three commercial apple orchards near Romney, West Virginia: Fairfax Orchard Company, which produced Stark Delicious apples; Gilkeson, Hart & Zimmerman Orchard, which produced York Imperial, Pennsylvania Winesap, Ben Davis, Stayman Winesap, Jonathan, Grimes Golden, and Rome Beauty apples; and the Mill Mountain Orchard Company, which produced York Imperial, Stayman Winesap, Pennsylvania Winesap, Rambo, Northern Spy, Canada Red, Ben Davis, Grimes Golden, Jonathan, Rome Beauty, Yellow Transparent, and Stark apples.

== Marriage and children ==
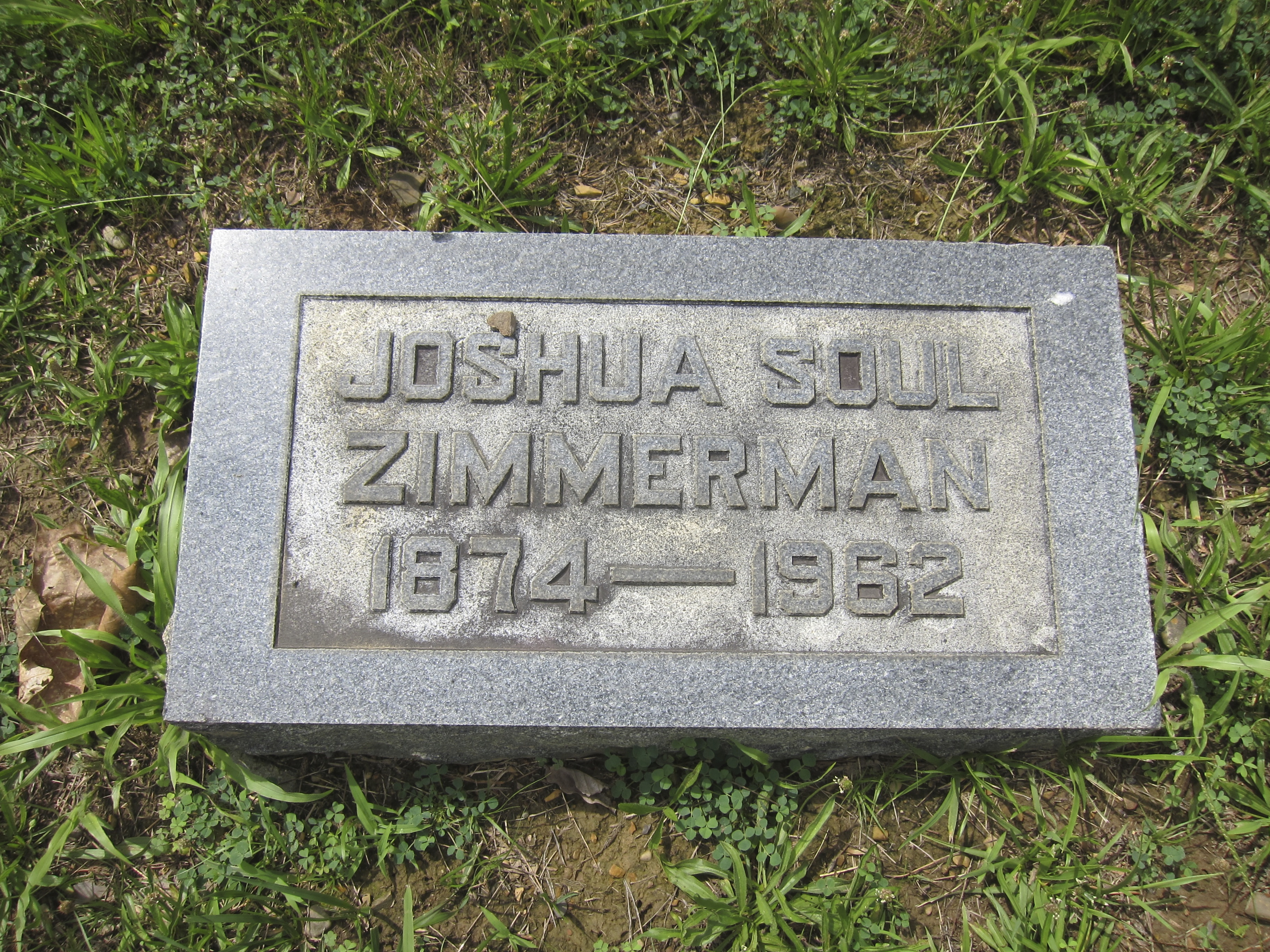
Gravestone at the interment site of Joshua Soule Zimmerman at Indian Mound Cemetery in Romney, West Virginia

Zimmerman married Kitty Campbell Vance on October 10, 1900, at the Vance family's Ashbrook farm, near Romney, West Virginia. Kitty Campbell Vance was the daughter of John T. and Mary Elizabeth Inskeep Vance of Romney. Zimmerman and his wife Kitty had four children:

- Mary Elizabeth Zimmerman Kump (March 21, 1903 – 1994), married Garnett Kerr Kump in 1940 in Hampshire County, West Virginia
- George Henry Zimmerman (February 20, 1905 – 1987)
- Kitty Campbell Zimmerman McCracken, married James Paris McCracken of Cisco, Texas at the Romney Presbyterian Church in Romney, West Virginia on August 20, 1946
- Vance Zimmerman (August 5, 1910 – September 27, 1976), married Mildred Sites in 1937 in Hampshire County, West Virginia

Zimmerman was an active layperson in the Methodist Episcopal Church, South, and served as a steward of the Romney Methodist Episcopal Church, South, congregations. He also served for a number of years as the superintendent of the congregation's Sunday school program, taught the men's bible class, and served on the church's board of trustees. Zimmerman represented the church in the Moorefield district and at annual conferences of the Methodist Episcopal Church, South. Despite his involvement in the Southern Methodist church, his wife Kitty and several of his children were Presbyterian. In addition, Zimmerman was the dean of the South Branch Bar Association.

== Later life and death ==
Zimmerman's wife Kitty predeceased him in 1937. He died at the Williamsport Sanitarium in Williamsport, Maryland, on September 2, 1962, following several months of illness. His funeral was held on September 5, 1962, at the Romney Methodist Church. Zimmerman was interred with his wife Kitty at Indian Mound Cemetery in Romney, West Virginia. He had practiced law in Romney, West Virginia, for 66 years.

== Bibliography ==
- American Historical Society (1923). History of West Virginia Old and New and West Virginia Biography, Volume 3. The American Historical Society, Inc.
- Camp, Walter Mason (1916). Railway Review, Volume 59. W. A. Smith. Archived from the original on October 31, 2013.
- Columbian University Press (1893). Catalogue of the Officers and Students of The Columbian University, Washington, D.C., For the Academic Year 1892 - '93. Washington, D.C.: Judd and De Weiler.
- Harris, John T., ed. (1916). "West Virginia Legislative Hand Book and Manual and Official Register" (PDF). West Virginia Blue Book. Charleston, West Virginia: The Tribune Printing Company. ISSN 0364-7323. OCLC 1012082243. Archived (PDF) from the original on August 13, 2021.
- Harris, John T., ed. (1922). "West Virginia Legislative Hand Book and Manual and Official Register" (PDF). West Virginia Blue Book. Charleston, West Virginia: The Tribune Printing Company. ISSN 0364-7323. OCLC 1012082243. Archived (PDF) from the original on April 27, 2021.
- Harris, John T., ed. (1923). "West Virginia Legislative Hand Book and Manual and Official Register" (PDF). West Virginia Blue Book. Charleston, West Virginia: The Tribune Printing Company. ISSN 0364-7323. OCLC 1012082243. Archived (PDF) from the original on April 24, 2021.
- Harris, John T., ed. (1924). "West Virginia Legislative Hand Book and Manual and Official Register" (PDF). West Virginia Blue Book. Charleston, West Virginia: The Tribune Printing Company. ISSN 0364-7323. OCLC 1012082243. Archived (PDF) from the original on April 27, 2021.
- Katzenberger, George A. (1897). Catalogue of the Legal Fraternity of Phi Delta Phi, Seventh Edition. Ann Arbor, Michigan: The Inland Press.
- Katzenberger, George A. (1909). Directory of the Legal Fraternity of Phi Delta Phi, Eighth Edition. Galesburg, Illinois: Mail Printing Company.
- Maxwell, Hu; Swisher, Howard Llewellyn (1897). History of Hampshire County, West Virginia From Its Earliest Settlement to the Present. Morgantown, West Virginia: A. Brown Boughner, Printer. OCLC 680931891. OL 23304577M.
- Munske, Roberta R.; Kerns, Wilmer L., eds. (2004). Hampshire County, West Virginia, 1754–2004. Romney, West Virginia: The Hampshire County 250th Anniversary Committee. ISBN 978-0-9715738-2-6. OCLC 55983178.
- Phi Delta Theta (1963). The Scroll of Phi Delta Theta for January, 1963. Phi Delta Theta. Archived from the original on January 28, 2015.
- Poor, Henry Varnum (1922). Poor's Manual of Railroads, Volume 55. Poor's Manual Company. Archived from the original on November 5, 2013.
- Pugh, Maud (2009). Capon Valley: Its Pioneers & Their Descendants, 1698 to 1940. Genealogical Publishing Company. ISBN 9780806345512. Archived from the original on January 5, 2014.
- Underwood, Guy, ed. (January 23, 1896). "Second Public Debate". The Columbian Call. Washington, D.C.: The Columbian University: 81–83 – via Internet Archive.
- Virginia State Corporation Commission (1917). Annual Report of the State Corporation Commission of Virginia. Compilations from Returns of Railroads, Canals, Electric Railways and Other Corporate Companies. Virginia State Corporation Commission. Archived from the original on November 3, 2013.
- West Virginia Department of Agriculture (1918). West Virginia Department of Agriculture Bulletin, Issues 37-56. West Virginia Department of Agriculture.

West Virginia House of Delegates
| Preceded by James Sloan Kuykendall | Member of the West Virginia House of Delegates from Hampshire County; 1921 – 1924 | Succeeded by Henry Washington Campbell, Jr. |
Legal offices
| Preceded by William B. Cornwell | Prosecuting Attorney for Hampshire County; 1900 – 1910 | Unknown |
