= Henry Bell Gilkeson =

American politician and lawyer

Honorable Henry Bell Gilkeson
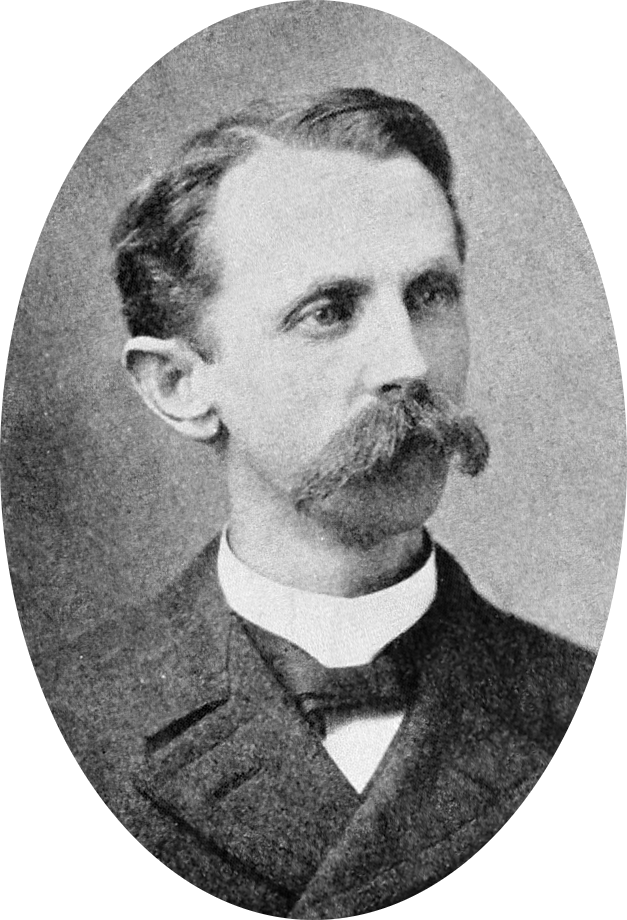

Member of the West Virginia Senate from the 12th district
- In office 1890–93 Serving with Solomon Cunningham
- Preceded by: Samuel Lightfoot Flournoy
- Succeeded by: John B. Finley

Member of the West Virginia House of Delegates from the Hampshire County district
- In office 1883–85
- Preceded by: Alexander W. Monroe
- Succeeded by: Amos L. Pugh
- In office 1909–11
- Preceded by: James Sloan Kuykendall
- Succeeded by: Robert Pugh Monroe

Principal of the West Virginia Schools for the Deaf and Blind
- In office 1887–88
- Preceded by: John Collins Covell
- Succeeded by: C. H. Hill

Superintendent of Hampshire County Schools
- In office 1877–79
- Preceded by: A. M. Alverson
- Succeeded by: Charles N. Hiett

President of the Bank of Romney
- In office 1888–1913
- Preceded by: None
- Succeeded by: John J. Cornwell

Personal details
- Born: June 6, 1850 Moorefield, Virginia (now West Virginia), United States
- Died: September 29, 1921 (aged 71) Mountain Lake Park, Maryland, United States
- Resting place: Indian Mound Cemetery, Romney, West Virginia, United States
- Party: Democratic Party
- Spouse: Mary Katherine Paxton
- Relations: Robert B. Gilkeson (father); Sarah E. Gilkeson (mother); Edward M. Gilkeson (brother)
- Children: Laura Paxton Gilkeson Arnold; Robert William Gilkeson; Henry Bell Gilkeson, Jr.
- Education: Hampden–Sydney College
- Profession: lawyer, politician, school administrator, and banker

Henry Bell Gilkeson (June 6, 1850 – September 29, 1921) was an American lawyer, politician, school administrator, and banker in West Virginia.

Gilkeson was born in Moorefield, Virginia (now West Virginia), the eldest child of a dry goods merchant, and was raised in Romney. Following his graduation from Hampden–Sydney College, Gilkeson became a schoolteacher and served as superintendent of the Hampshire County Schools district from 1877 to 1879. Gilkeson later studied law and started a law practice in Romney. Following the death of John Collins Covell in 1887, Gilkeson served as the principal of the West Virginia Schools for the Deaf and Blind until 1888.

Gilkeson served in the West Virginia Legislature as a state senator representing the 12th District in the West Virginia Senate (1890–93) and as a member of the West Virginia House of Delegates (1883–85 and 1909–11). Gilkeson served as the mayor of Romney beginning in 1885, and the first president of the Bank of Romney (1888–1913).

== Early life and education ==
Henry Bell Gilkeson was born in Moorefield, Virginia (now West Virginia) on June 6, 1850. He was the eldest child of Robert B. Gilkeson and his wife, Sarah E. Gilkeson, both of Scottish ancestry. His father was a prominent dry goods merchant in Romney, where Henry and his brother, Edward, were raised.

Gilkeson graduated from Hampden–Sydney College in Hampden Sydney, Virginia, in 1872. While a student, he was inducted as a member of the Beta Theta Pi fraternity. Gilkeson completed a special course in engineering at Yale University. He also received further education in Germany.

== Academic career ==
Following his graduation from Hampden–Sydney College, Gilkeson became a schoolteacher and later served as superintendent of the Hampshire County Schools district from 1877 to 1879. Before 1886, Gilkeson was elected a member of the Romney Literary Society together with his brother.

=== West Virginia Schools for the Deaf and Blind ===
From 1876 to 1888, Gilkeson served as a member and secretary of the fourth, fifth, and sixth Board of Regents of the West Virginia Schools for the Deaf and Blind, a position that enabled him to become familiar with the school's efforts to educate its deaf and blind students.

In 1887, upon the death of the schools' principal, John Collins Covell, Gilkeson was selected by the Board of Regents to serve as principal of the institution. The Board of Regents had reservations about selecting an immediate successor to Covell and requested that Gilkeson fill the position temporarily until the board could find a permanent replacement. Gilkeson left his lucrative law practice and accepted the position under the condition that he serve as interim principal while the Board of Regents sought a more suitable candidate to build upon Covell's initiatives and reforms. Gilkeson believed that only administrators and educators fluent in sign language should be appointed to serve in the School for the Deaf, and during his tenure as principal he found that personnel who relied on interpreters did not receive "satisfactory results". After he had spent a few weeks as acting principal, the Board of Regents reconvened and appointed him to stay on permanently.

During his tenure, the position of principal included the roles of clerk, bookkeeper, steward, and final arbiter of matters in the classroom. While Gilkeson lacked special training for the position, his business experience allowed him to run the schools in an economically efficient manner, which pleased the schools' Board of Regents.

In the summer of 1888, Gilkeson was delegated by the Board to Regents to attend the Conference of Superintendents and Principals of American Schools for the Deaf in New York City and select the most fitting candidate present at the conference or recommended someone to replace him as principal of the West Virginia Schools for the Deaf and Blind. Gilkeson tendered an offer to C. H. Hill, then an instructor at the Maryland School for the Deaf, and upon Gilkeson's return to Romney he recommended Hill and resigned from his post as principal. Hill was subsequently appointed by the Board to fill the position. While the Board of Regents was pleased with Gilkeson's performance as principal and wished for him to stay on in the position, but he preferred to return to his professional law and political career in the end.

Gilkeson resumed the practice of law and pursued a political career, but he continued his involvement with, and advocacy for, the West Virginia Schools for the Deaf and Blind, especially through his influence as a prominent lawyer and state legislator. Gilkeson used his position as a state legislator to condemn and hold accountable the officials responsible for the mismanagement of the West Virginia Schools for the Deaf and Blind, and often interceded on the schools' behalf following Hill's retirement due to political reasons. Gilkeson was displeased with the state's political interference in the schools, and the "multiplication" of positions within the institution that were filled with personnel who had political or business ties but lacked prior knowledge or experience with deaf and blind education.

== Law and political careers ==
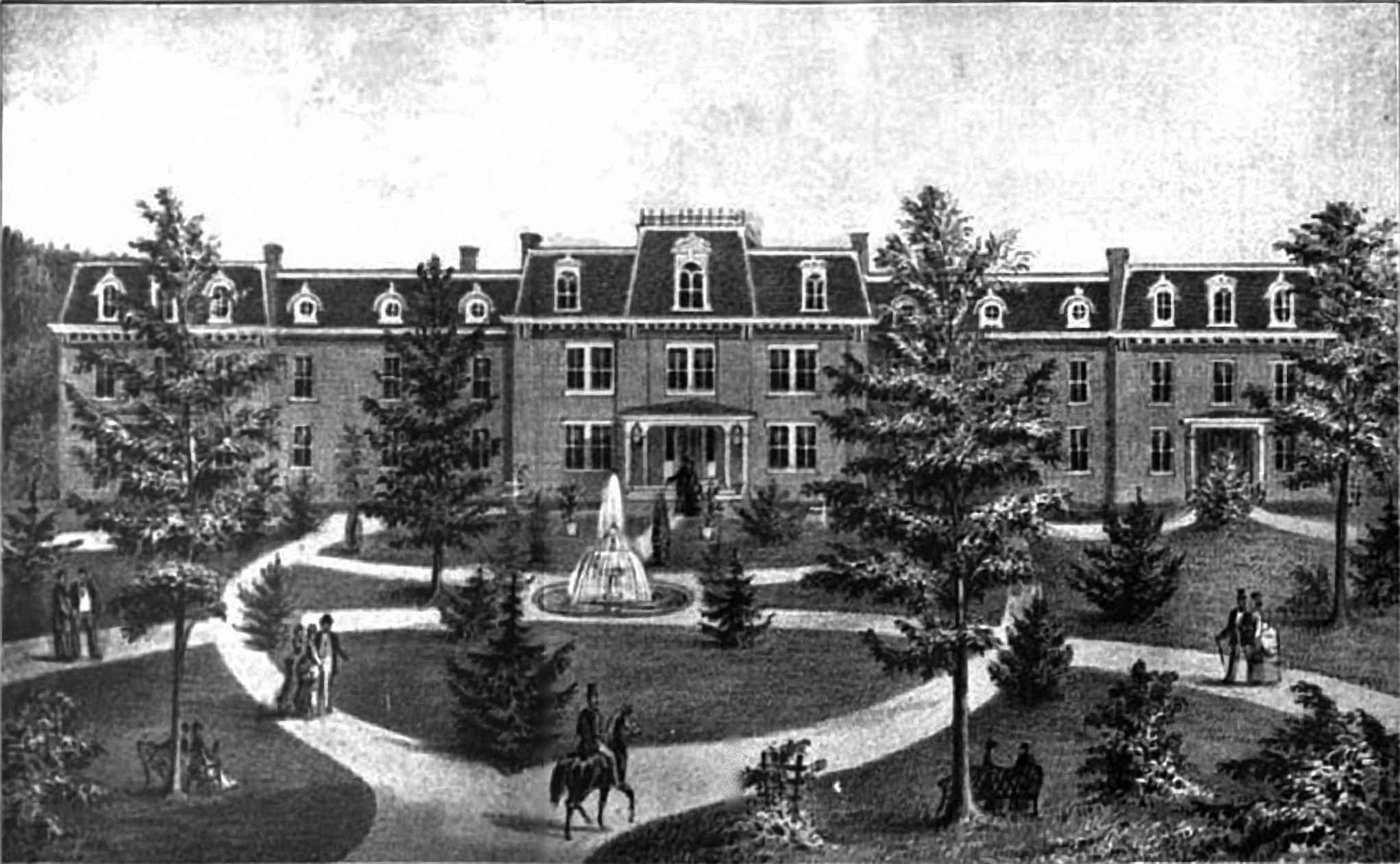
Administration Building of the West Virginia Schools for the Deaf and Blind in Romney, West Virginia in 1880. Gilkeson served as the schools' principal from 1887 to 1888.

Following his tenure as superintendent of Hampshire County Schools, Gilkeson undertook the study of law and started a law practice in Romney; he subsequently became a prominent lawyer in the community. His law office was located on Main Street in Romney, two blocks from the West Virginia Schools for the Deaf and Blind. Due to his preeminence in the legal field and high standing in the community, Gilkeson served as dean of the Hampshire County Bar Association.

Gilkeson was twice elected to represent Hampshire County as a member of the West Virginia House of Delegates for the 1883–85 and 1909–11 legislative sessions. As the leadership of the House of Delegates was being determined at the 1884 Democratic Party State Convention in Wheeling, Gilkeson was a leading contender for a speaker candidacy, but fellow Romney native Robert White was selected as the party's candidate instead.

On August 13, 1890, the Twelfth Senatorial District Democratic Convention nominated Gilkeson to fill the vacant West Virginia State Senate seat of Samuel Lightfoot Flournoy. Gilkeson was elected to fill the seat during the general election of 1890 and served the remainder of Flournoy's senate term until 1893. At the time of his appointment, the Twelfth Senatorial District consisted of Grant, Hampshire, Hardy, Mineral, and Pendleton counties. In 1892, Gilkeson was appointed to the Committees on the Judiciary, Public Buildings and Humane Institutions, Federal Relations, Forfeited, Delinquent, and Unappropriated Lands, and Clerks Office. In addition to serving in the state senate, Gilkeson also held the position of mayor of Romney, West Virginia, beginning in 1885.

== Banking and business career ==
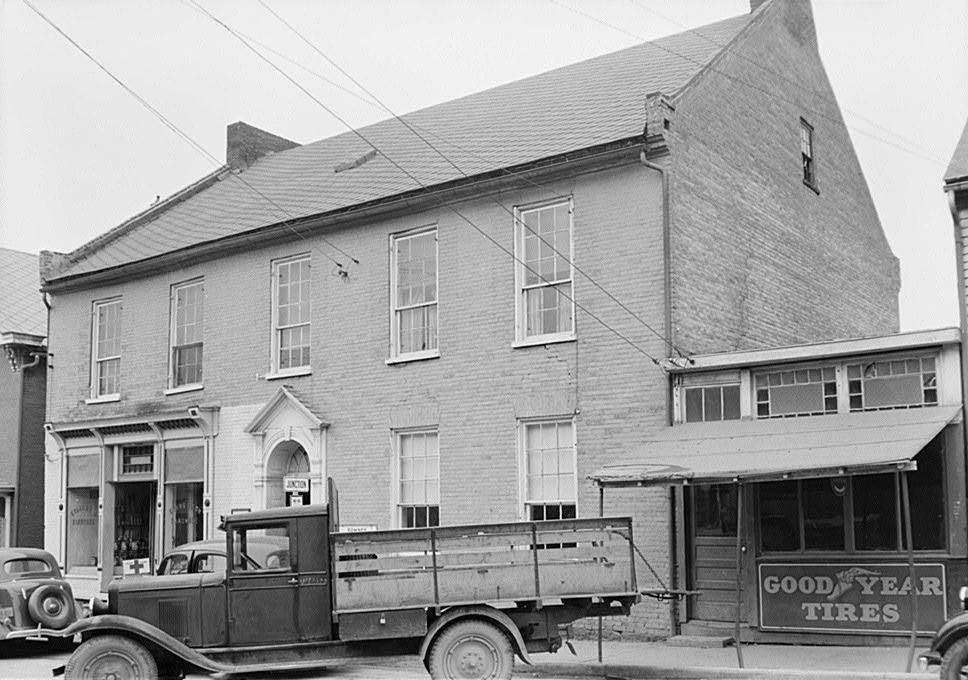
Photographed in 1937, the Wirgman Building in Romney housed the Bank of Romney from 1888 to 1965. The structure was razed in 1965 for the construction of the current Bank of Romney building.

Gilkeson served on the board of directors as the first president of the Bank of Romney after it was granted its charter by the West Virginia Legislature on September 3, 1888, and was opened later on December 20, 1888. During Gilkeson's tenure as president, the Bank of Romney occupied two rooms on the ground floor of the Wirgman Building, where the city's previous bank, the Bank of the Valley of Virginia, was located prior to the American Civil War. Gilkeson served as the president of the Bank of Romney until his retirement in 1913, when he was succeeded by John J. Cornwell, 15th Governor of West Virginia. In November 1906, Gilkeson, R. W. Dailey Jr., P. J. Ruckman, and Joshua Soule Zimmerman were incorporators of the Mill Mountain Orchard Company, which operated orchards along the top of Mill Creek Mountain west of Romney.

== Later life and death ==
Gilkeson resided in Romney for the majority of his life and was involved in most of the community's organizations as either a leader, officer, or stockholder. Gilkeson's son Henry Bell Gilkeson Jr., died on November 16, 1901, from injuries sustained by falling against a piece of sharp iron, which penetrated his stomach. Gilkeson's wife, Mary Katherine, predeceased him in February 1910 following the effects of a surgical procedure she had undergone in Cumberland, Maryland.

In his later years, Gilkeson developed allergic rhinitis and experienced a "physical breakdown" following the death of his son, Robert William Gilkeson, on October 2, 1918, during the Meuse-Argonne Offensive of World War I and shortly before the Armistice with Germany. Robert William Gilkeson was a second lieutenant in Company C of the 316 Engineers, and was interred in the Meuse-Argonne American Cemetery and Memorial near Romagne-sous-Montfaucon. Robert William Gilkeson was a 1907 graduate of his father's alma mater, Hampden–Sydney College.

On account of his increasingly failing health, Gilkeson spent the summer of 1921 in Mountain Lake Park, Maryland, to recuperate. About a week before his death, Gilkeson fell down a flight of porch steps at his vacation residence, fracturing a number of bones. He died on September 29, 1921, in Mountain Lake Park, and his funeral was held on the anniversary of his son's death on October 2, 1921. Gilkeson is interred with his wife Mary Katherine and son Henry Jr., at Indian Mound Cemetery in Romney, West Virginia.

In recounting Gilkeson's achievements to the Conference of Superintendents and Principals of American Schools for the Deaf following his death, West Virginia Schools for the Deaf and Blind instructor Charles D. Seaton said of Gilkeson:

"His learning ability and integrity were recognized in the various courts in which he practised. As a counselor he was safe, careful, painstaking, and always conscientious. As a criminal lawyer he defended the interests of his clients with all his energy, never however beyond the bounds of honor or of the ethics of his profession. His courtesy to the court, to his associates at the bar, and to witnesses was always such as to place upon him the unerasable stamp of 'gentleman'. His decisions were always based on one proposition – the right. He was not aggressive. He was unobtrusive in manner, but firm as a rock in his conception of duty. It was a blessed privilege for any young man to have been associated with him and to have been influenced by him as one was bound to be".

— Charles D. Seaton, Conference of Superintendents and Principals of American Schools for the Deaf (1921)

In 1980, Gilkeson's son-in-law George Sloan Arnold bequeathed the $1.5-million George S. Arnold Trust to Hampden–Sydney College, his shared alma mater with his father-in-law and brother-in-law Robert William Gilkeson. At the time, it was the largest amount given by a living person and the institution's second-largest gift in its 204-year history. Arnold gave the trust in honor of the Gilkeson family.

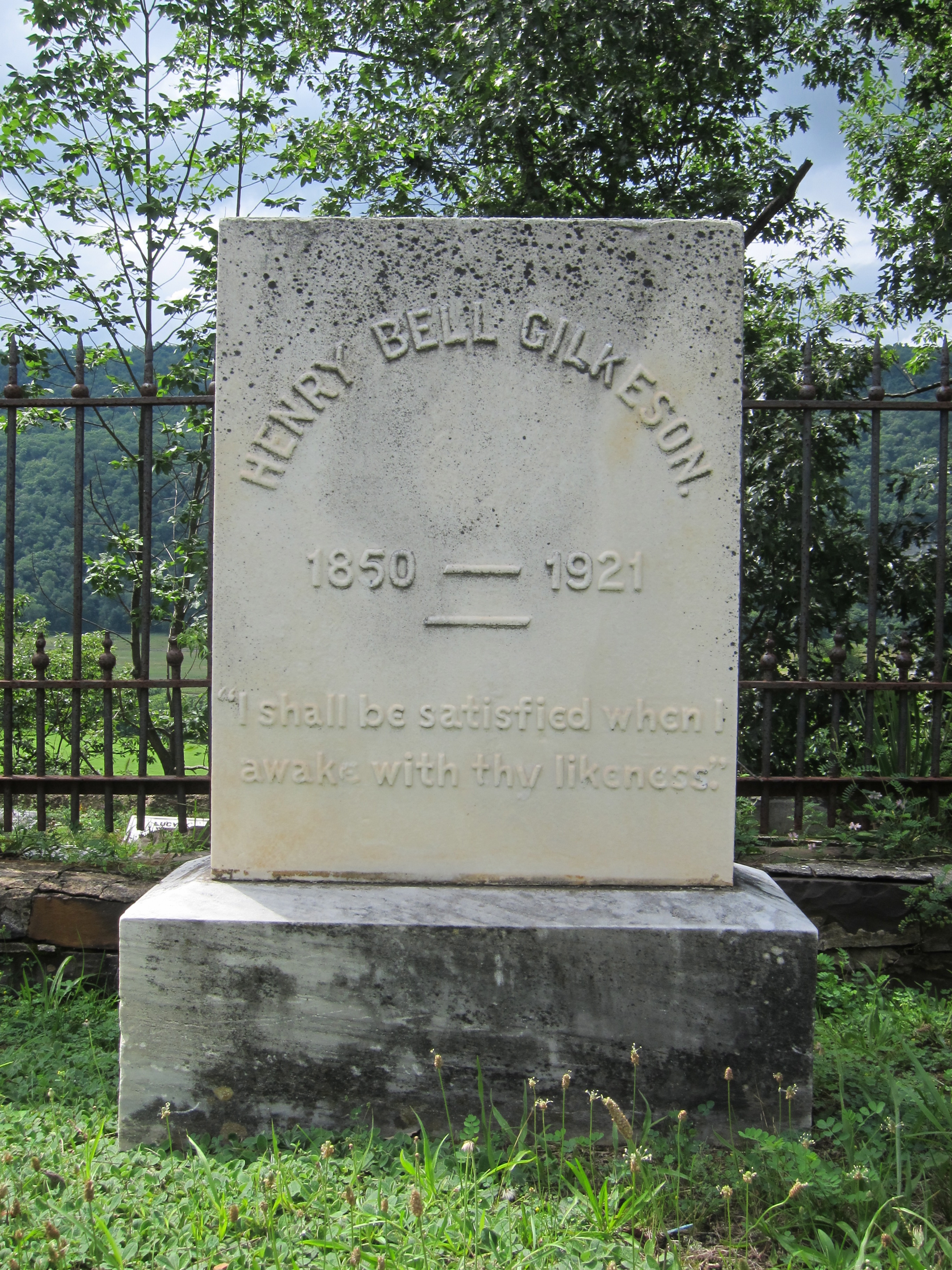
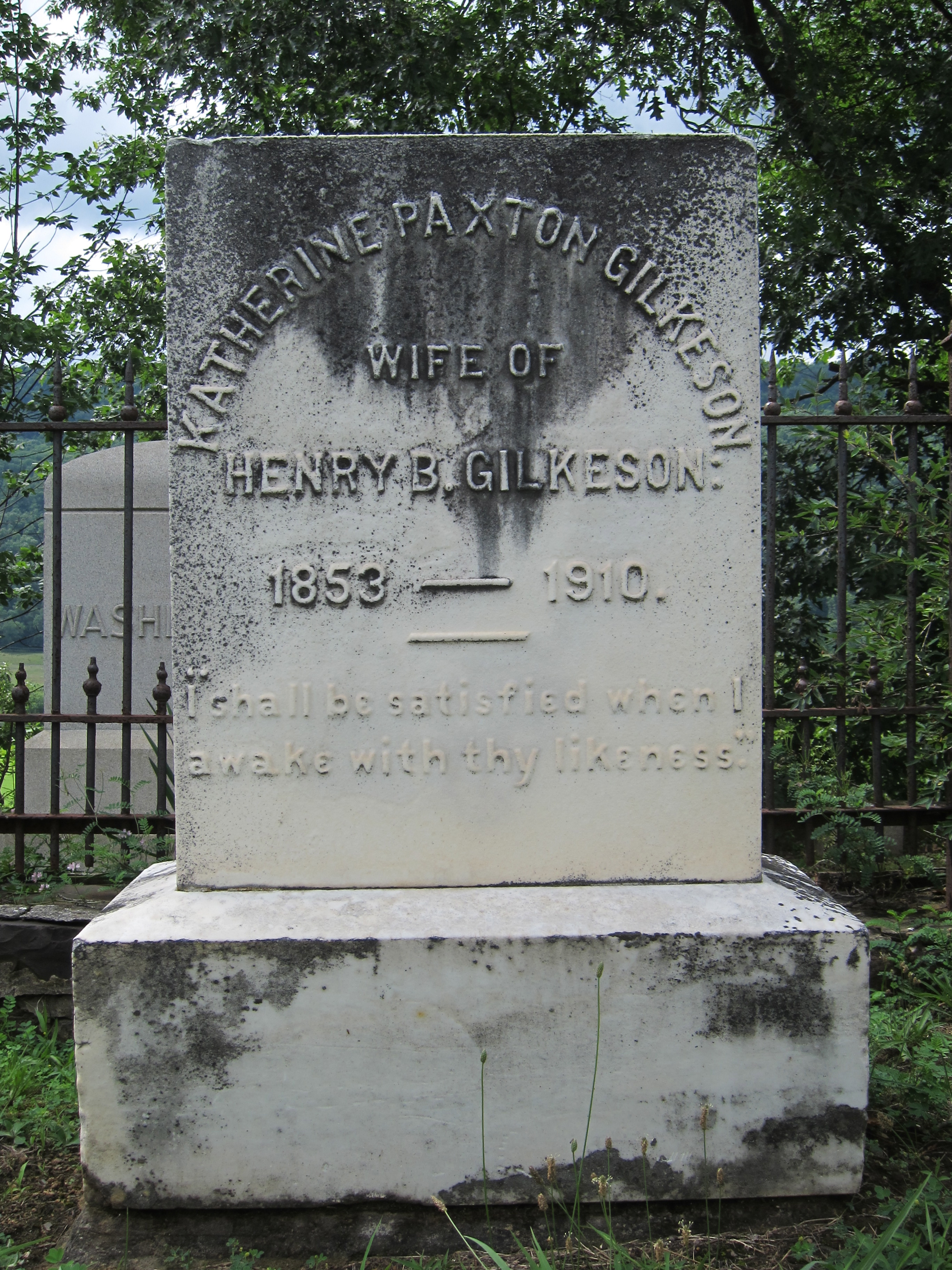
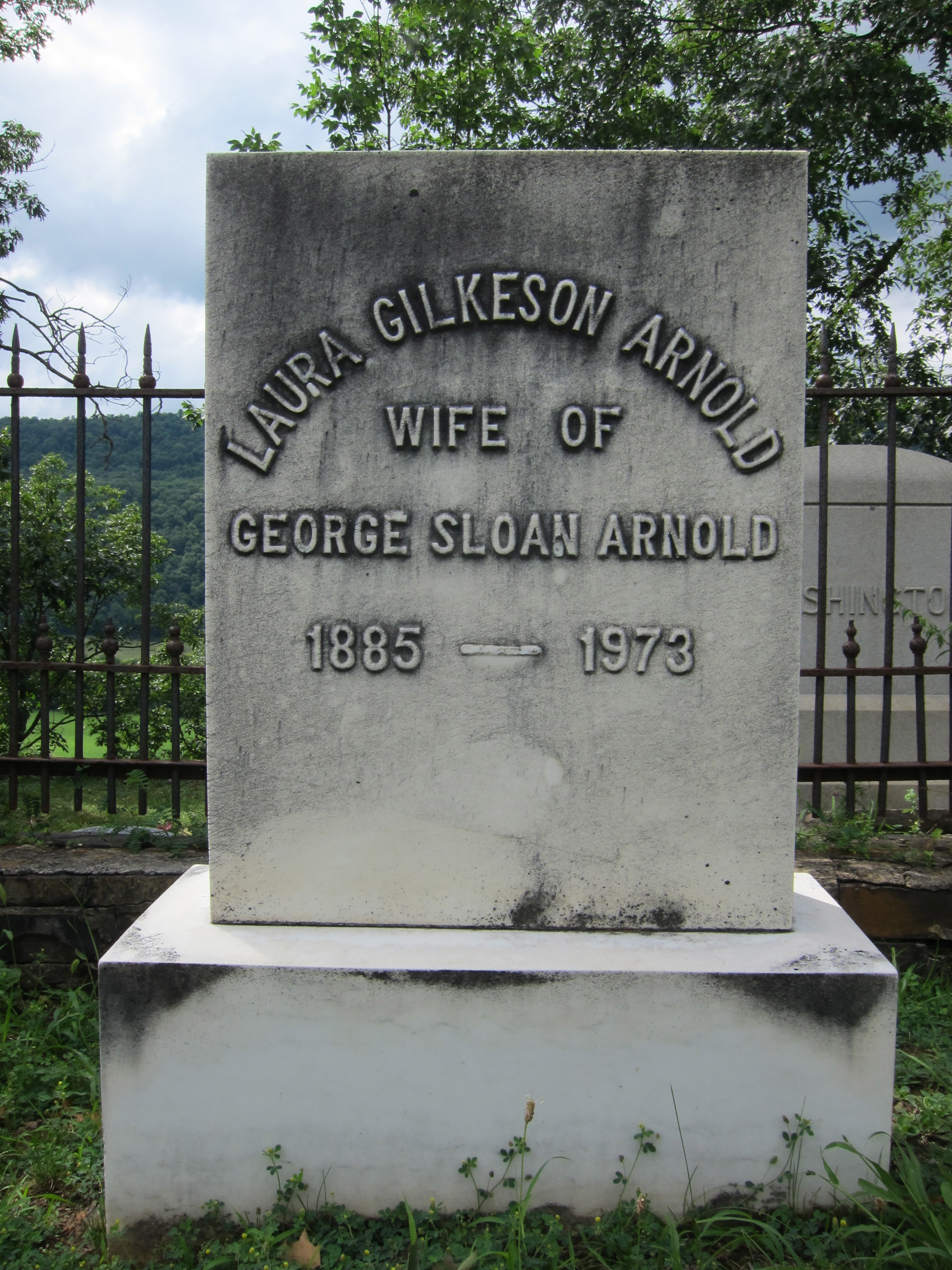
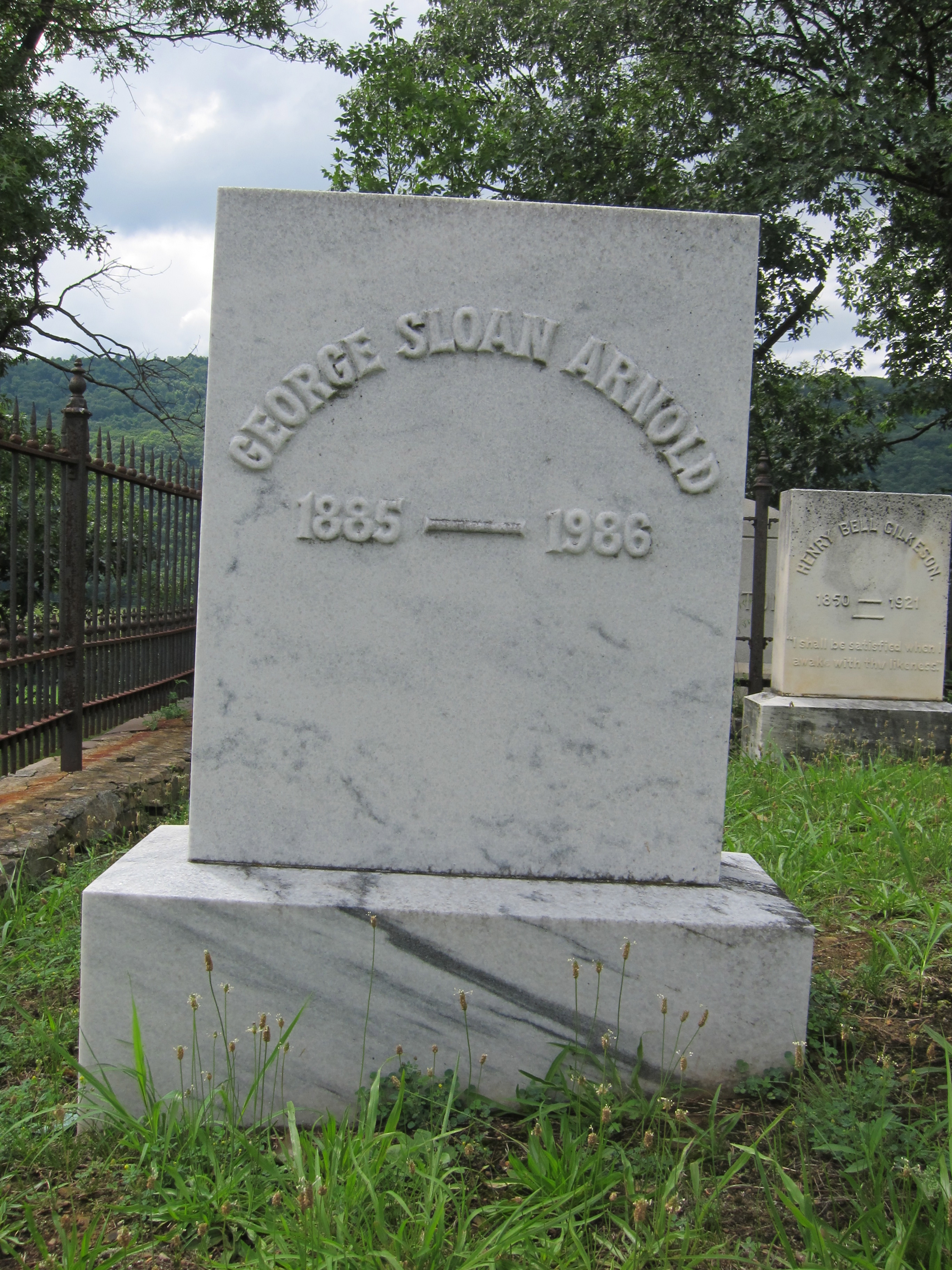
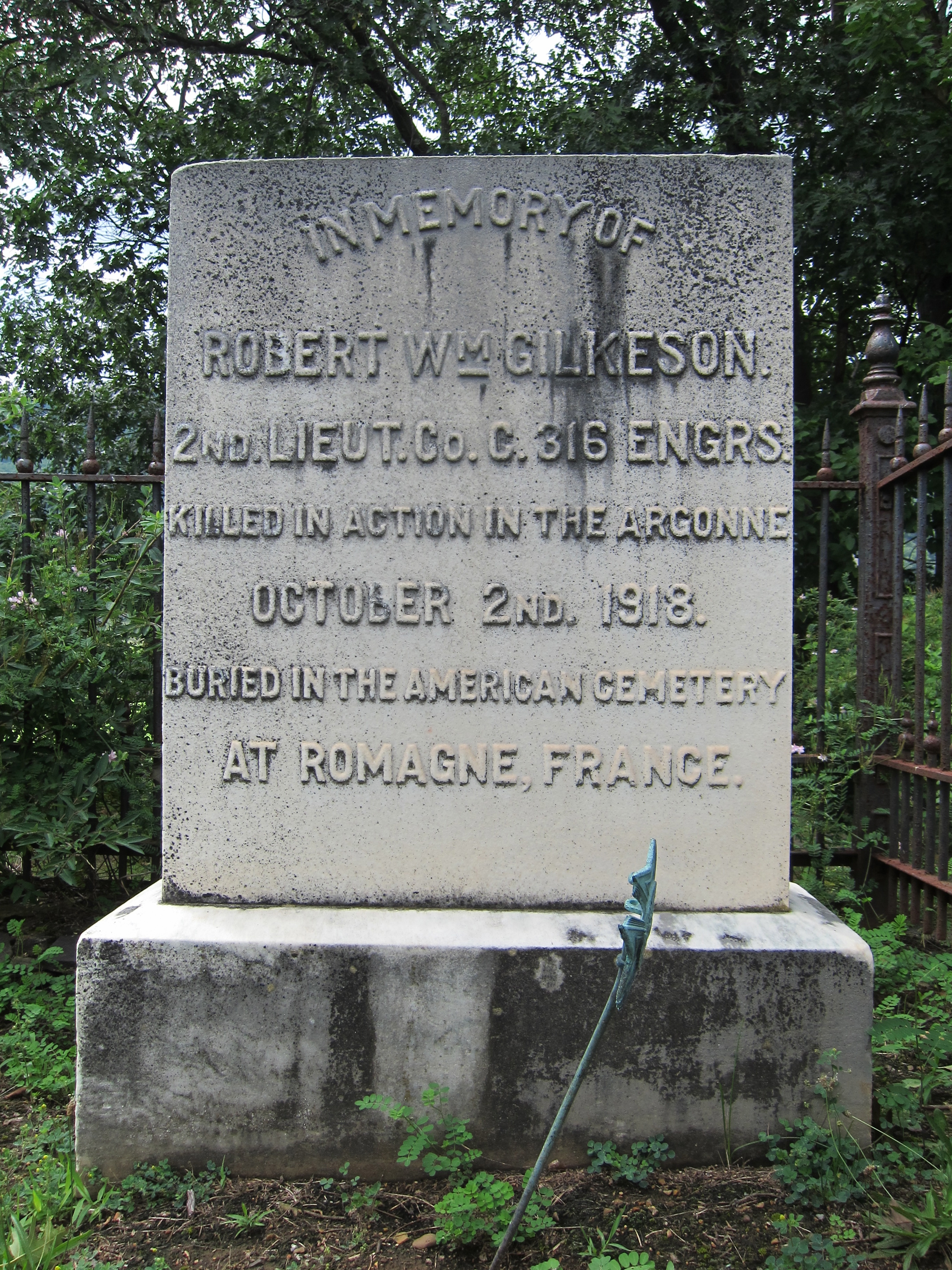
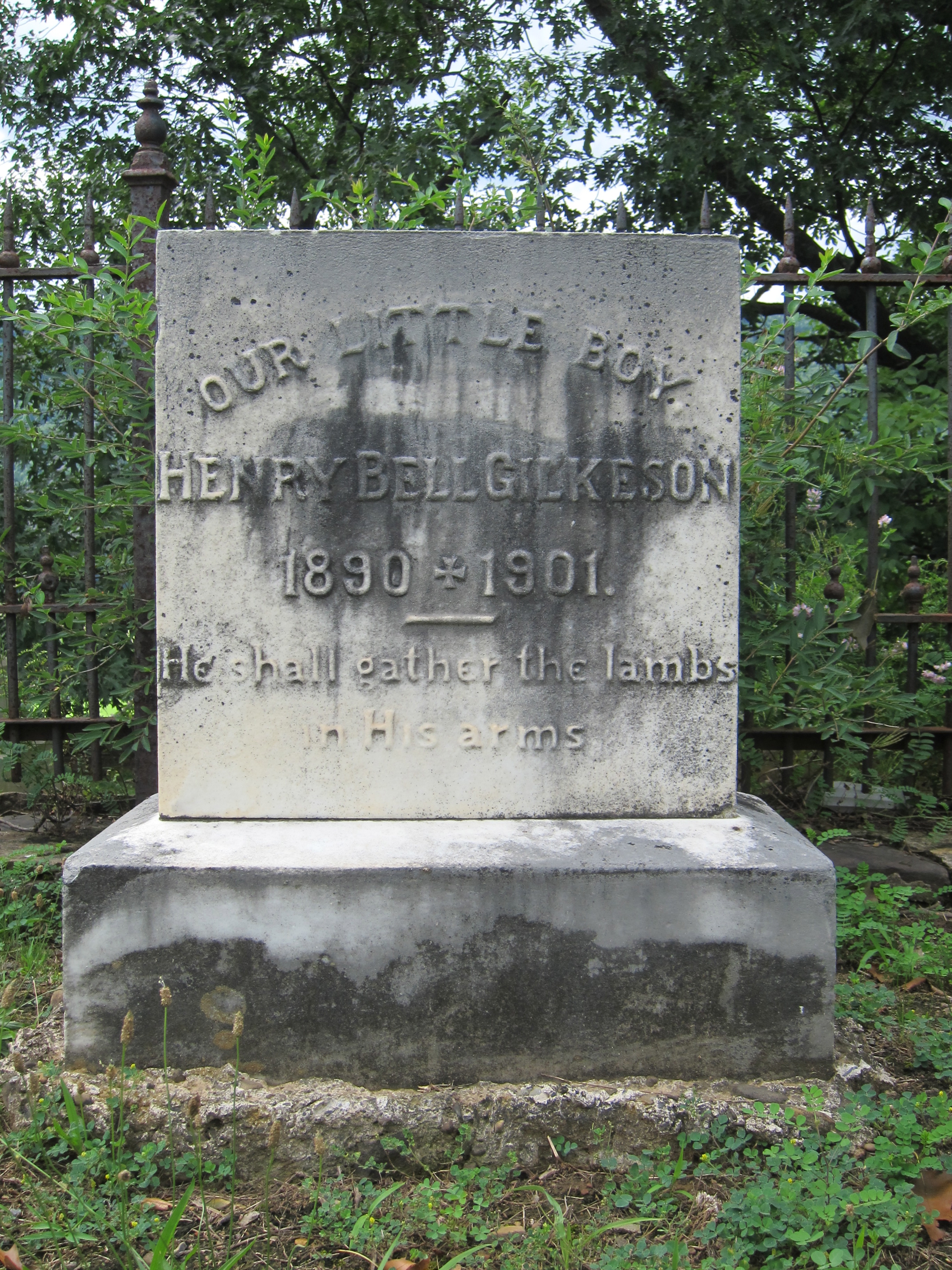
Gravestones at the Gilkeson family plot in Indian Mound Cemetery in Romney. From left to right: Henry Bell Gilkeson, Mary Katherine Paxton Gilkeson, Laura Paxton Gilkeson Arnold, George Sloan Arnold, Robert William Gilkeson, and Henry Bell Gilkeson, Jr.

== Religious activities ==
Gilkeson was active in the Presbyterian Church in Hampshire County and served as a trustee for the Presbytery of Winchester along with Samuel Lightfoot Flournoy. In 1881, Gilkeson and his fellow trustees were instrumental in securing from Amos L. and Allie G. Pugh a house and a large, partially wooded land lot in Capon Bridge for use by the Presbytery as a centrally located manse in Hampshire County. Gilkeson remained a trustee of the Presbytery from 1876 until his death in 1921. He was also a commissioner of the General Assembly of the Presbyterian Church in the United States representing the Presbytery of Winchester, and attended the assembly's meeting in Jackson, Mississippi, May 15–25, 1902.

== Marriage and family ==
Gilkeson was married on November 19, 1884, to Mary Katherine Paxton (1853–1910), daughter of Jordan J. and E. J. Paxton of Iron Gate, Virginia. Their wedding ceremony was officiated by Reverend George W. Finley of Romney at the residence of Mary Ann Lipscomb at 1537 I Street, N.W. in Washington, D.C. Mary Katherine had been employed as a teacher under Lipscomb at Waverly Seminary. Following the ceremony, Gilkeson and his wife embarked upon a tour of the Northern United States. Gilkeson and his wife Mary Katherine had three children together:

- Laura Paxton Gilkeson Arnold (August 18, 1885 – 1973), married Romney lawyer George Sloan Arnold (1885–1986)
- Robert William Gilkeson (July 25, 1887 – October 2, 1918)
- Henry Bell Gilkeson Jr. (February 8, 1890 – November 16, 1901)

== Bibliography ==
- Brannon, Selden W., ed. (1976). Historic Hampshire: A Symposium of Hampshire County and Its People, Past and Present. Parsons, West Virginia: McClain Printing Company. ISBN 978-0-87012-236-1. OCLC 3121468.
- Brown, James T. (1917). Catalogue of Beta Theta Pi, Ninth Edition. New York City: James T. Brown. OCLC 1185707. Archived from the original on April 30, 2016 – via Google Books.
- Cartmell, T. K. (2009). Shenandoah Valley Pioneers and Their Descendants: A History of Frederick County, Virginia from Its Formation in 1738 to 1908. Bowie, Maryland: Heritage Books. ISBN 978-1-55613-243-8. OCLC 20963384. Archived from the original on June 10, 2016 – via Google Books.
- Fusfeld, Irving S. (1921). "American Annals of the Deaf: Organ of the Convention of American Instructors of the Deaf, Volume 66". American Annals of the Deaf. Washington, D.C.: The Conference of Superintendents and Principals of American Schools for the Deaf. ISSN 0002-726X. OCLC 5695496. Archived from the original on July 7, 2014 – via Google Books.
- Hampden–Sydney College (1980). "Arnold Trust at $1.5 Million and Parade of Unprecedented Gifts; George S. Arnold Trust Funds Scholarships". Record of the Hampden–Sydney Alumni Association. 57 (1). Hampden–Sydney College: 2. OCLC 27312733 – via Internet Archive.
- Hampshire County Extension Homemakers (1991). Hampshire County, West Virginia: A Pictorial History. Marceline, Missouri: Hampshire County Extension Homemakers, Walsworth Publishing Company. ISBN 978-1-60354-047-6. OCLC 51940415. Archived from the original on January 7, 2014.
- Lewis, Virgil Anson (1889). History of West Virginia, In Two Parts. Philadelphia: Hubbard Brothers, Publishers. OCLC 4270768 – via Internet Archive.
- Maxwell, Hu; Swisher, Howard Llewellyn (1897). History of Hampshire County, West Virginia From Its Earliest Settlement to the Present. Morgantown, West Virginia: A. Brown Boughner, Printer. OCLC 680931891. OL 23304577M.
- McClure, James Alexander (1914). The McClure Family. Petersburg, Virginia: Presses of Frank A. Owen. OCLC 2842908 – via Internet Archive.
- Munske, Roberta R.; Kerns, Wilmer L., eds. (2004). Hampshire County, West Virginia, 1754–2004. Romney, West Virginia: The Hampshire County 250th Anniversary Committee. ISBN 978-0-9715738-2-6. OCLC 55983178.
- Paxton, William McClung (1903). The Paxtons: Their Origin in Scotland, and Their Migrations Through England and Ireland, to the Colony of Pennsylvania, Whence They Moved South and West, and Found Homes in Many States and Territories. Platte City, Missouri: Landmark Print. OCLC 1952174 – via Internet Archive.
- West Virginia Department of Education (1907). The History of Education in West Virginia. Charleston, West Virginia: Tribune Printing Company. OCLC 6380608 – via Internet Archive.
- West Virginia Legislature (1918). West Virginia Legislative Hand Book and Manual and Official Register, 1918. Charleston, West Virginia: Tribune Printing Company. OCLC 162522748. Archived from the original on April 30, 2016 – via Google Books.
- West Virginia Legislature (1922). John T. Harris, Clerk of the West Virginia Senate (ed.). West Virginia Legislative Hand Book and Manual and Official Register, 1922. Charleston, West Virginia: Tribune Printing Company. Archived from the original on April 30, 2016 – via Google Books.
- West Virginia Senate (1891). Journal of the Senate of the State of West Virginia. West Virginia Legislature. OCLC 297818917. Archived from the original on April 1, 2016 – via Google Books.
- Woodworth, Robert Bell (1947). A History of the Presbytery of Winchester (Synod of Virginia): Its Rise and Growth, Ecclesiastical Relations, Institutions and Agencies, Churches and Ministers, 1719–1945. McClure Printing Company. OCLC 1873001. Archived from the original on June 10, 2016 – via Google Books.

West Virginia House of Delegates
Preceded by Alexander W. Monroe	Member of the West Virginia House of Delegates from Hampshire County; 1883 – 85	Succeeded by Amos L. Pugh
Preceded by James Sloan Kuykendall	Member of the West Virginia House of Delegates from Hampshire County; 1909 – 11	Succeeded by Robert Pugh Monroe
West Virginia Senate
Preceded by Samuel Lightfoot Flournoy	West Virginia State Senator from the 12th District; 1890 – 93; Served alongside: Solomon Cunningham	Succeeded by John B. Finley
Academic offices
Preceded by A. M. Alverson	Superintendent of Hampshire County Schools; 1877 – 79	Succeeded by Charles N. Hiett
Preceded by John Collins Covell	Principal of the West Virginia Schools for the Deaf and Blind; 1887 – 88	Succeeded by C. H. Hill
Business positions
Preceded by None	President of the Bank of Romney; 1888 – 1913	Succeeded by John J. Cornwell
