= James Sloan Kuykendall =

American politician and lawyer (1878-1928)

Honorable James Sloan Kuykendall
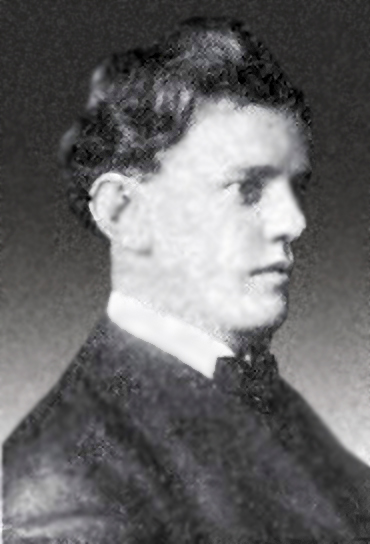
- Portrait of James Sloan Kuykendall, c. 1907.

Member of the West Virginia House of Delegates from the Hampshire County district
- In office 1907–1908
- Preceded by: Garnett Kerr Kump
- Succeeded by: Henry Bell Gilkeson
- In office 1919–1920
- Preceded by: William Warfield Carder
- Succeeded by: Joshua Soule Zimmerman

Personal details
- Born: December 9, 1878 Springfield Magisterial District, Hampshire County, West Virginia, U.S.
- Died: February 12, 1928 (aged 49) Winchester, Virginia, U.S.
- Resting place: Indian Mound Cemetery, Romney, West Virginia, U.S.
- Party: Democratic Party
- Spouse: Bertha Ray Williams
- Relations: William Kuykendall (father); Hannah Pierce Sloan Kuykendall (mother)
- Children: Alma Elizabeth Kuykendall Sheehan; James Sloan Kuykendall, Jr. Mary Kay Kuykendall Armstrong
- Education: Hampden–Sydney College; Washington and Lee University; Cumberland School of Law; University of North Carolina School of Law
- Profession: Farmer, criminal defense lawyer, politician

James Sloan Kuykendall (December 9, 1878 – February 12, 1928) was an American farmer, lawyer, and Democratic politician in the U.S. state of West Virginia. Kuykendall was twice elected as a member of the West Virginia House of Delegates representing Hampshire County (1907–1908 and 1919–1920). Kuykendall also served three terms as the mayor of Romney and later fulfilled the position of city attorney.

Kuykendall was born in 1878 in Hampshire County, West Virginia, into one of the oldest families in the county, which was of Dutch descent. He was raised on his family's farm, where he engaged in agricultural pursuits. Kuykendall was educated in Hampshire County's rural public schools and subsequently completed his post-secondary education at Hampden–Sydney College and Washington and Lee University. In 1901, he graduated from the Cumberland School of Law, then completed a course in jurisprudence at the University of North Carolina School of Law.

Kuykendall first practiced law in Greensboro, North Carolina, before establishing a law practice in Romney, West Virginia. He was elected to represent Hampshire County in the West Virginia House of Delegates for one term in 1906 and another term in 1918, each consisting of two years. He was the mayor of Romney for three terms, and in 1922 he served as Romney's city attorney. Kuykendall was elected to three terms as a member of the Hampshire County Board of Education; he also served as a Chancery Commissioner for the county. During World War I, Kuykendall was a member of the Legal Advisory Board of Hampshire County; he also participated in Liberty bond drives and directed sales to raise American Red Cross funds. Kuykendall was engaged in the management of a commercial peach orchard near Romney known as Sherman Orchard. He died in 1928 and was interred at Indian Mound Cemetery in Romney.

== Early life and family ==
James Sloan Kuykendall was born on December 9, 1878, in the Springfield Magisterial District of Hampshire County, West Virginia. He was the eldest child and son of William Kuykendall and his wife Hannah Pierce Sloan Kuykendall. Kuykendall's family was of Dutch descent and was one of the oldest families residing in Hampshire County. He was probably named for his maternal grandfather, James Sloan. Kuykendall had two younger brothers and one younger sister: Michael Blue Kuykendall, Richard Sloan Kuykendall, and Nellie Frank Kuykendall. For the first 20 years of his life, Kuykendall resided on his family's farm, where he engaged in agricultural pursuits.

== Education ==
Kuykendall received his primary education in Hampshire County's rural public schools. He commenced his higher education studies at Hampden–Sydney College in Hampden Sydney, Virginia, and later attended Washington and Lee University in Lexington, Virginia. Kuykendall subsequently engaged in the study of jurisprudence at the Cumberland School of Law of Cumberland University in Lebanon, Tennessee, from which he received a diploma in 1901. He then completed a similar course in law at the University of North Carolina School of Law in Chapel Hill, North Carolina. Following this course at the University of North Carolina, Kuykendall passed his bar examination before the North Carolina Supreme Court and was admitted to the bar in North Carolina in September 1903.

== Law career ==
Following his admission to the North Carolina bar, Kuykendall commenced practicing law in Greensboro, where he practiced for a little over a year before returning to West Virginia. He established his law practice in Romney and made his permanent residence there. Kuykendall argued his first case before the Hampshire County Circuit Court in defense of a Mr. Miller, who had been charged with petit larceny. Kuykendall secured the acquittal of his client, which further encouraged the young lawyer. Following this case, he continued to perform as a criminal defense lawyer. According to historian James Morton Callahan, Kuykendall "adhered to his rule to take part only on the side of the defense, and he has a merited reputation or skill and ability in that particular field." By 1923, he had been a defense attorney in three murder cases: State v. Hetrick, State v. Averell, and State v. Gardner. Kuykendall secured acquittals for his clients in State v. Hetrick and State v. Averell, but in State v. Gardner, his client was found guilty and sentenced to life imprisonment.

As an attorney for the Hampshire Southern Railroad Company in 1907, Kuykendall worked to acquire the right-of-way for the 38-mile (61 km) rail line through the South Branch Potomac River valley between the Baltimore and Ohio Railroad (B&O) South Branch line at Romney and Petersburg.

== Political career ==
=== Romney municipal offices ===
Kuykendall was elected to his first term as mayor of Romney in January 1906 by a margin of eight votes. He and the elected city council members ran on an anti-liquor license platform. At the time of the election, Romney had been following a policy of banning the issuance of liquor licenses within the city for over 20 years. Throughout his political career, Kuykendall served a total of three terms as Romney's mayor. He later served as Romney's city attorney in 1922.

=== West Virginia House of Delegates ===
In late 1906, Kuykendall was elected to his first term as a member of the West Virginia House of Delegates and represented Hampshire County from 1907 through 1908 in the 28th West Virginia Legislative Session. During his first term in the House of Delegates, Kuykendall served on the following standing committees: Education; Counties, Districts, and Municipal Corporations; Private Corporations and Joint Stock Companies; Arts, Science, and General Improvement; and State Boundaries. He was elected to a second term in the House of Delegates in 1918 and served in the 34th West Virginia Legislative Session from 1919 through 1920. In January 1920, Kuykendall participated in a conference between Maryland and West Virginia legislators, which recommended that the states' highway commissions be authorized to connect their state highway systems at one or more points crossing the Potomac River.

=== Hampshire County offices ===
Kuykendall took an interest in the Hampshire County Schools system and was elected to three terms as a member of the Hampshire County Board of Education. He also served in a county-wide position alongside Robert White and Joshua Soule Zimmerman as a Commissioner in Chancery for the Hampshire County Circuit Court. During World War I, Kuykendall was a member of the Legal Advisory Board of Hampshire County, during which time he assisted in producing several hundred questionnaires for the county's prospective soldiers. He also participated in Liberty bond drives and directed sales to raise funds for the American Red Cross.

=== West Virginia Democratic Party offices ===
Kuykendall was a lifelong member of the Democratic Party and cast his first vote for Democratic presidential nominee William Jennings Bryan in the United States presidential election of 1900. He was elected as a member of the Hampshire County Democratic Party Central Committee in 1908, and he was elected to three terms as the committee's chairperson. Kuykendall was also elected as the chairperson of the Executive Committee of West Virginia's 2nd congressional district in 1914 and served for one term. He was nominated as a presidential elector for the 2nd congressional district in the Electoral College for the election (1912) and reelection (1918) of Woodrow Wilson.

In 1916, Kuykendall was a delegate to the West Virginia Democratic Party State Convention at Parkersburg that nominated John J. Cornwell as the party's gubernatorial candidate. He was also both a delegate and chairperson of the West Virginia Democratic Party's Congressional Convention that nominated William Gay Brown, Jr., as a candidate for the United States House of Representatives. Kuykendall was a strong proponent of Brown, whom he supported in subsequent conventions and elections.

== Business pursuits ==
According to The Census of the Peach Crop of 1907 in West Virginia published by the West Virginia Department of Agriculture, Kuykendall was engaged in the management of a commercial peach orchard near Romney known as Sherman Orchard. In 1907, Kuykendall's orchard produced Carman, Champion, Elberta, Salways, Bilyeu, and Heath Cling peach varieties, totaling 5,800 baskets in all. Kuykendall was still operating a peach orchard in 1920.

== Later life and death ==
Kuykendall suffered a stroke in late 1927. On 10 February 1928, he suffered a stroke and paralysis in a courtroom of the Winchester courthouse after the delivery of his closing argument in a circuit court criminal case. Kuykendall died at Winchester Memorial Hospital on the morning of 12 February. On 14 February, Kuykendall's funeral service was held at his Romney residence and it was officiated by the Reverend H. B. Wheeler, presiding elder of the Moorefield District of the Methodist Episcopal Church, South. He was interred at Indian Mound Cemetery. Kuykendall was survived by his wife Bertha, his three children, and his brother, Richard Sloan Kuykendall. Kuykendall's wife Bertha died on March 4, 1962, and was interred beside him at Indian Mound Cemetery.

== Personal life ==
Kuykendall was married in Hampshire County on April 5, 1905, to Bertha Ray Williams (November 10, 1883 – March 4, 1962), born in Fairfax County, Virginia, and the daughter of Reverend James P. Williams and his wife Mary S. Williams. Williams's father was the presiding elder of the Moorefield District of the Methodist Episcopal Church, South. Kuykendall and his wife Bertha had three children together including two daughters and one son:

- Alma Elizabeth Kuykendall Sheehan (January 14, 1906 – December 6, 1970), married on June 31, 1928, to William Terrell Sheehan (December 5, 1902 – June 16, 1957)
- James Sloan Kuykendall, Jr. (December 11, 1906 – February 17, 1995), married Emily Light (June 29, 1911 – June 19, 1982)
- Mary Ray Kuykendall Armstrong (January 5, 1909 – May 15, 1996), married Robert W. Armstrong (April 11, 1905 – June 16, 1958)

While Kuykendall's wife belonged to the Methodist Episcopal Church, South, he was raised as a Presbyterian, and for five years he was superintendent of the Presbyterian Church's Sunday school.

== Bibliography ==
- Brannon, Selden W., ed. (1976). Historic Hampshire: A Symposium of Hampshire County and Its People, Past and Present. Parsons, West Virginia: McClain Printing Company. ISBN 978-0-87012-236-1. OCLC 3121468.
- Bruce, Philip Alexander (1929). Virginia; Rebirth of the Old Dominion, Volume 4. Chicago and New York City: Lewis Publishing Company. OCLC 4559837. Archived from the original on April 16, 2016 – via Google Books.
- Callahan, James Morton (1923). History of West Virginia, Old and New, Volume 3. Chicago and New York City: American Historical Society. OCLC 373051 – via Internet Archive.
- Couper, William (1952). History of the Shenandoah Valley, Volume 3. New York City: Lewis Historical Publishing Company. OCLC 6135725. Archived from the original on October 9, 2013 – via Google Books.
- Kuykendall, George Benson (1919). History of the Kuykendall Family Since Its Settlement in Dutch New York in 1646 with Genealogy As Found in Early Dutch Church Records State and Government Documents. Portland, Oregon: Kilham Stationery and Printing Company. OCLC 5086045. Archived from the original on October 9, 2013 – via Google Books.
- Maxwell, Hu; Swisher, Howard Llewellyn (1897). History of Hampshire County, West Virginia From Its Earliest Settlement to the Present. Morgantown, West Virginia: A. Brown Boughner, Printer. OCLC 680931891. OL 23304577M.
- Munske, Roberta R.; Kerns, Wilmer L., eds. (2004). Hampshire County, West Virginia, 1754–2004. Romney, West Virginia: The Hampshire County 250th Anniversary Committee. ISBN 978-0-9715738-2-6. OCLC 55983178.
- West Virginia Department of Agriculture (1907). Bulletin of the West Virginia Department of Agriculture, Issues 15-36. Charleston, West Virginia: West Virginia Department of Agriculture. OCLC 7022329. Archived from the original on January 3, 2014 – via Google Books.
- West Virginia Legislature (1922). John T. Harris, Clerk of the West Virginia Senate (ed.). West Virginia Legislative Hand Book and Manual, 1922. Charleston, West Virginia: The Tribune Printing Company. OCLC 9771361. Archived from the original on April 30, 2016 – via Google Books.
- West Virginia Legislature (2011). Darrell E. Holmes, Clerk of the West Virginia Senate (ed.). "West Virginia Blue Book, 2011". West Virginia Blue Book. Charleston, West Virginia: Chapman Printing. ISSN 0364-7323. OCLC 1251675.
- West Virginia Secretary of State (1907). Manual of the State of West Virginia. Charleston, West Virginia: The Tribune Printing Company. OCLC 11348331. Archived from the original on January 3, 2014 – via Google Books.

West Virginia House of Delegates
Preceded by Garnett Kerr Kump	Member of the West Virginia House of Delegates from Hampshire County; 1907 – 1908	Succeeded by Henry Bell Gilkeson
Preceded by William Warfield Carder	Member of the West Virginia House of Delegates from Hampshire County; 1919 – 1920	Succeeded by Joshua Soule Zimmerman
