= Hampshire High School (West Virginia) =

Location
- 157 Trojan Way; Romney, West Virginia 26757; 39°19′33″N 78°41′57″W

Information
- School type: Public
- Founded: 1964
- School board: Hampshire County Schools
- Principal: Amy Haines
- Teaching staff: 62.25 (FTE)
- Grades: 9-12
- Enrollment: 740 (2024-2025)
- Student to teacher ratio: 11.89
- Language: English
- Colors: Green and white
- Mascot: Trojan

Hampshire High School is a public school in Romney, West Virginia that serves grades 9 through 12 and is a part of Hampshire County Schools under the auspices of the Hampshire County Board of Education. It is the only high school in Hampshire County. Hampshire High School is located on Trojan Way (West Virginia Secondary Route 50/47) off of the Northwestern Turnpike (U.S. Route 50) near Romney. The school currently has approximately 800 students enrolled, with that number slightly declining. It also employs approximately 70 faculty members. Hampshire High School's current principal is Amy Haines.

== Background ==
HHS is a product of a consolidation of Capon Bridge High School and Romney High School in the Fall of 1964. The site selected for the high school's campus was a knoll on South Branch Mountain along the Northwestern Turnpike (U.S. Route 50) east of Romney. Originally serving 10th through 12th grades, Hampshire High School underwent an expansion in 1998 and began serving 9th graders in the Fall of 1999.

== Mascot and colors ==
Hampshire High School's colors are green and white with the occasional addition of black and/or gold. Its mascot is the Trojan.

== Sports ==
Hampshire High School currently has the following athletic programs: football, soccer, cross country, track and field, volleyball, basketball, baseball, softball, wrestling, cheerleading, swimming and golf.

Its athletic complex consists of the Paul Clovis Trail (cross country), Rannells Field (football/soccer/track), a football practice field, Soldier Field (soccer practice field), discus field, baseball field, softball field, basketball/volleyball court, tennis court, and baseball/softball indoor hitting/pitching facility.

== Notable alumni ==
- Jerry Mezzatesta, long-serving West Virginia House of Delegates member for the 50th District, former teacher at Hampshire High School
- Sam Pancake, actor, mother Robin Pancake is a former art teacher at Hampshire High School

== See also ==
- List of high schools in West Virginia
- Education in West Virginia
