= High Knob (West Virginia) =

Mountain in Hampshire County, West Virginia, United States of America

Highest point
- Elevation: 2,648 ft (807 m)
- Coordinates: 39°11′57″N 78°53′57″W

Geography
- Location: Hampshire / Hardy counties, West Virginia, U.S.
- Parent range: Ridge-and-Valley Appalachians
- Topo map: USGS Old Fields

Climbing
- First ascent: unknown
- Easiest route: Hike

High Knob is a mountain summit on the border between Hampshire and Hardy counties in West Virginia's Eastern Panhandle. High Knob is known for its overlook of The Trough and of points in three counties. A historical marker was placed on U.S. Route 220/West Virginia Route 28 noting its scenic and historical value. Geologically, High Knob is a summit of Mill Creek Mountain.
