= Mill Creek Mountain =

Mountain ridge in West Virginia, United States

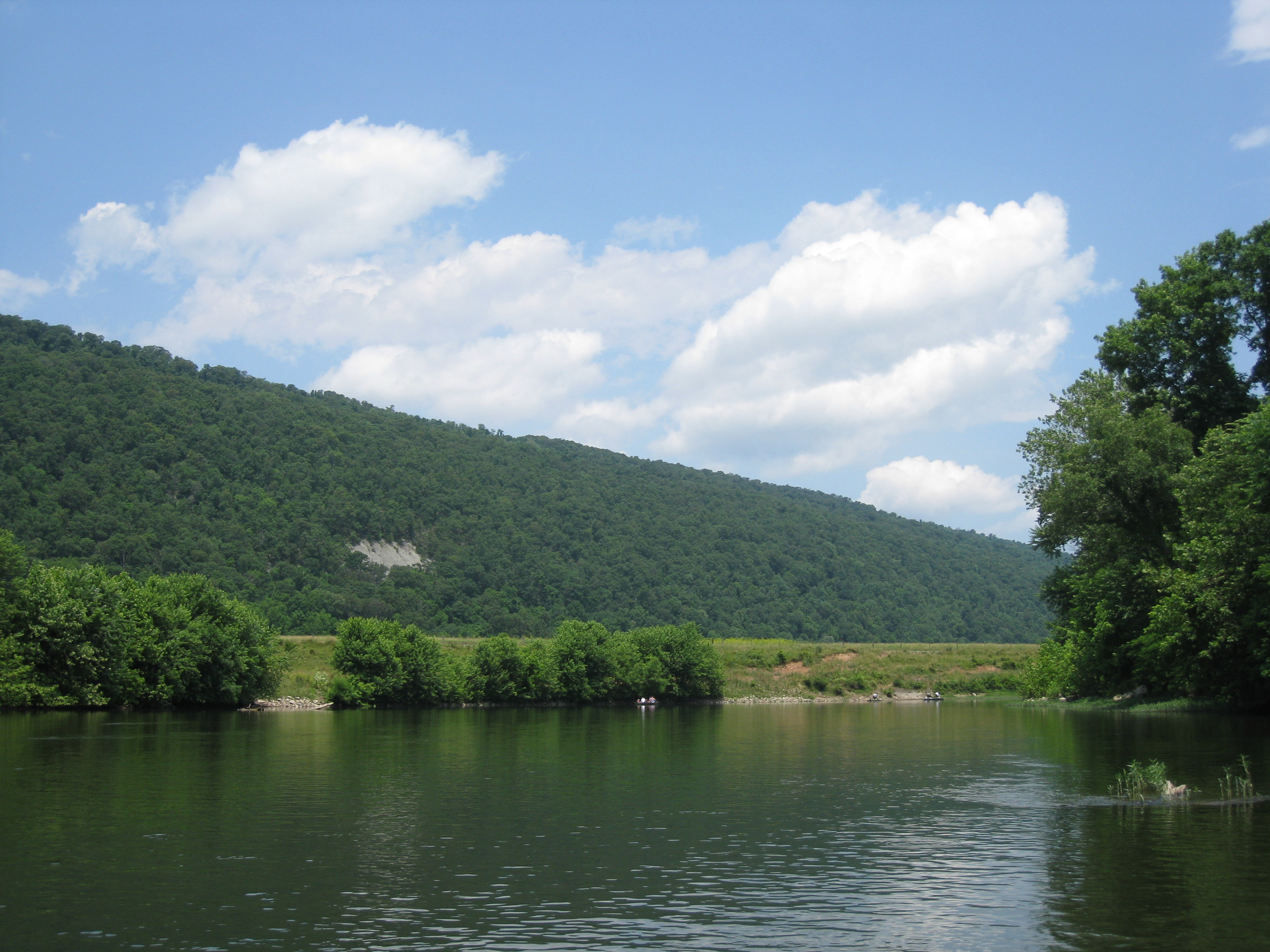
- Mill Creek Mountain viewed from the South Branch Potomac River near Romney, West Virginia.

Highest point
- Peak: High Knob
- Elevation: 2,650 ft (810 m)
- Coordinates: 39°11′57″N 78°53′57″W

Geography
- Location within West Virginia
- Country: United States
- State: West Virginia
- Range coordinates: 39°17′35″N 78°49′58″W

Mill Creek Mountain is a continuous mountain ridge that runs northeast through Hampshire and Hardy counties in the Eastern Panhandle region of the U.S. state of West Virginia. Rising to its greatest elevation of 2,650 feet (808 m) at High Knob, Mill Creek is a folded mountain ridge, belonging to the Ridge-and-Valley Appalachians. Mill Creek Mountain forms the western edge of the South Branch Potomac River Valley and is named for Mill Creek that carves through it at Mechanicsburg Gap allowing the Northwestern Turnpike (U.S. Route 50) to pass through as well. Along with Sawmill Ridge (1,716 feet/523 m), Mill Creek Mountain forms the Trough along the South Branch.

Hanging Rocks at Wappocomo, south of Springfield, are located on the northern edge of the gap in Mill Creek Mountain formed by the South Branch.

== Summits and Knobs ==
Although Mill Creek Mountain is a continuous mountain ridge, it is made up of a number of summits and knobs with individual names. These are listed from south to north.

- River Ridge, 1,906 feet (581 m)
- High Knob, 2,648 feet (807 m)
- Unnamed Knob, 2,066 feet (629 m)
- Unnamed Knob, 1,993 feet (607 m)
- Unnamed Knob, 1,968 feet (599 m)
- Thrasher Knob, 2,142 feet (653 m)
- Merrit Knob, 1,952 feet (595 m)
- Long Knob, 1,725 feet (525 m)
- Green Knob, 1,620 feet (500 m)
- Island Ridge, 1,500 feet (457 m)
- Fairview Mountain, 2,351 feet (716 m)
- Fort Mill Ridge, 1,100 feet (335 m)
- Mill Creek Ridge at Romney, 1,771 feet (539 m)

== Image gallery ==
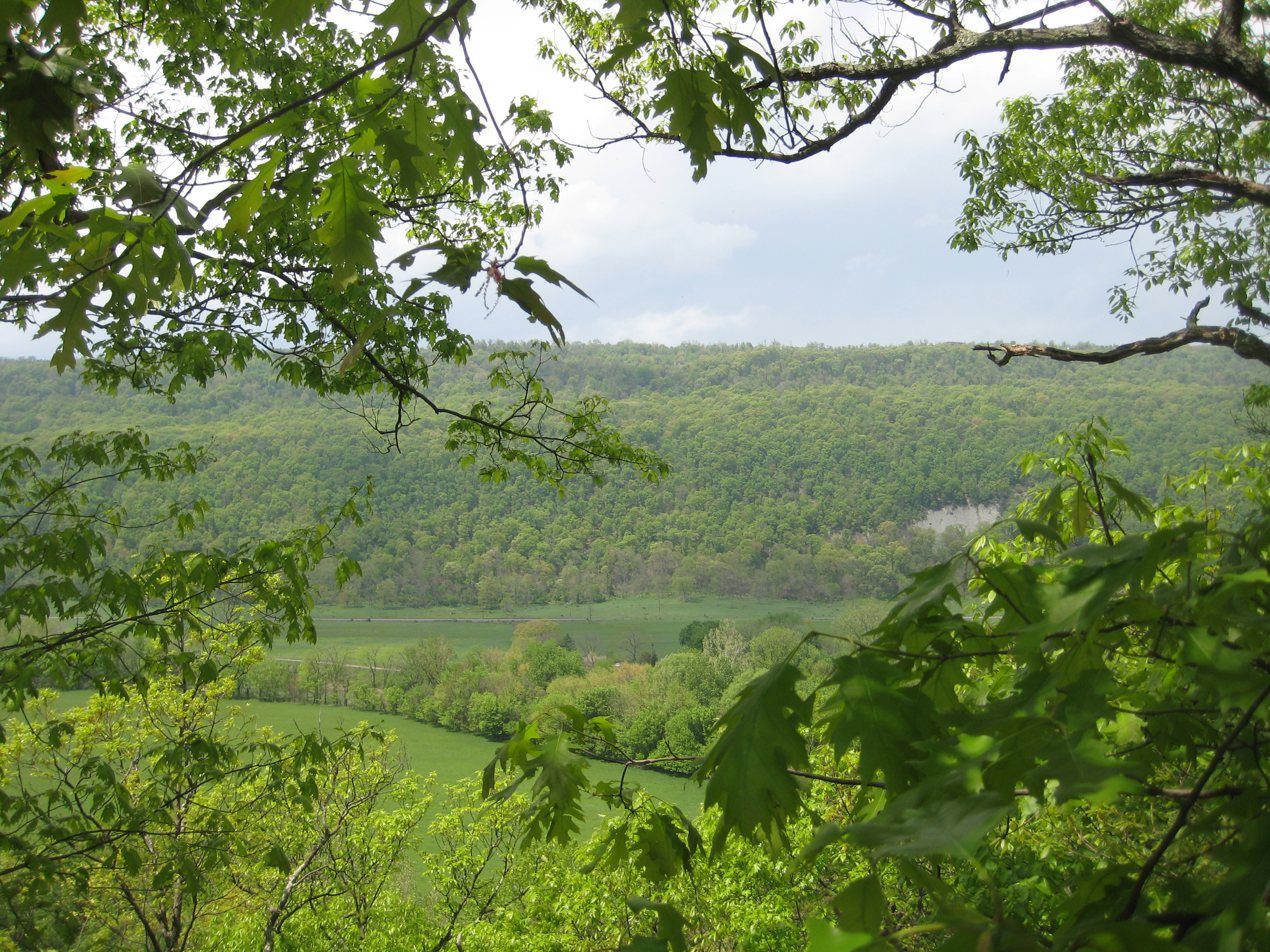
View of Mill Creek Mountain from Indian Mound Cemetery

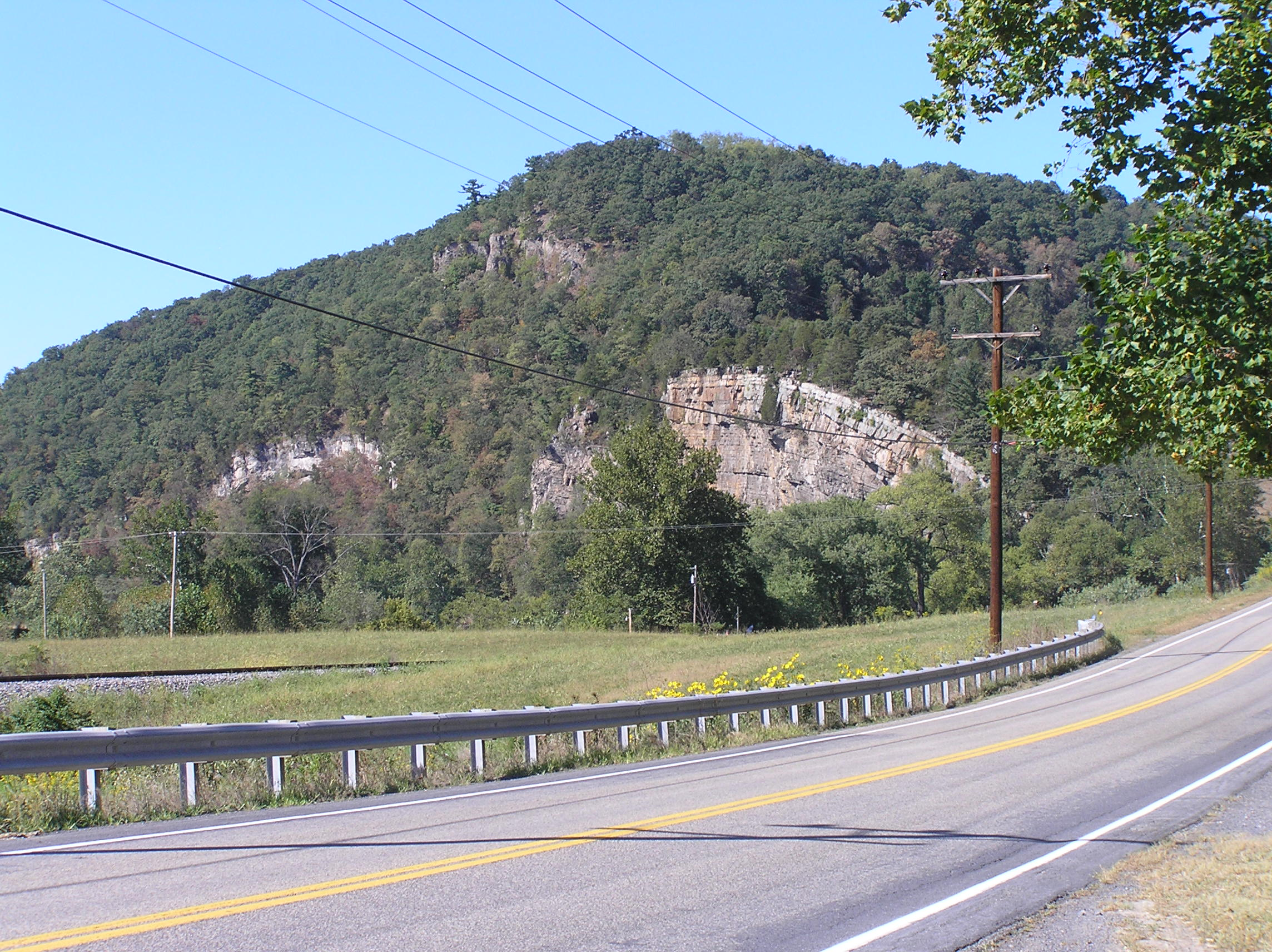
Hanging Rocks at Wappocomo

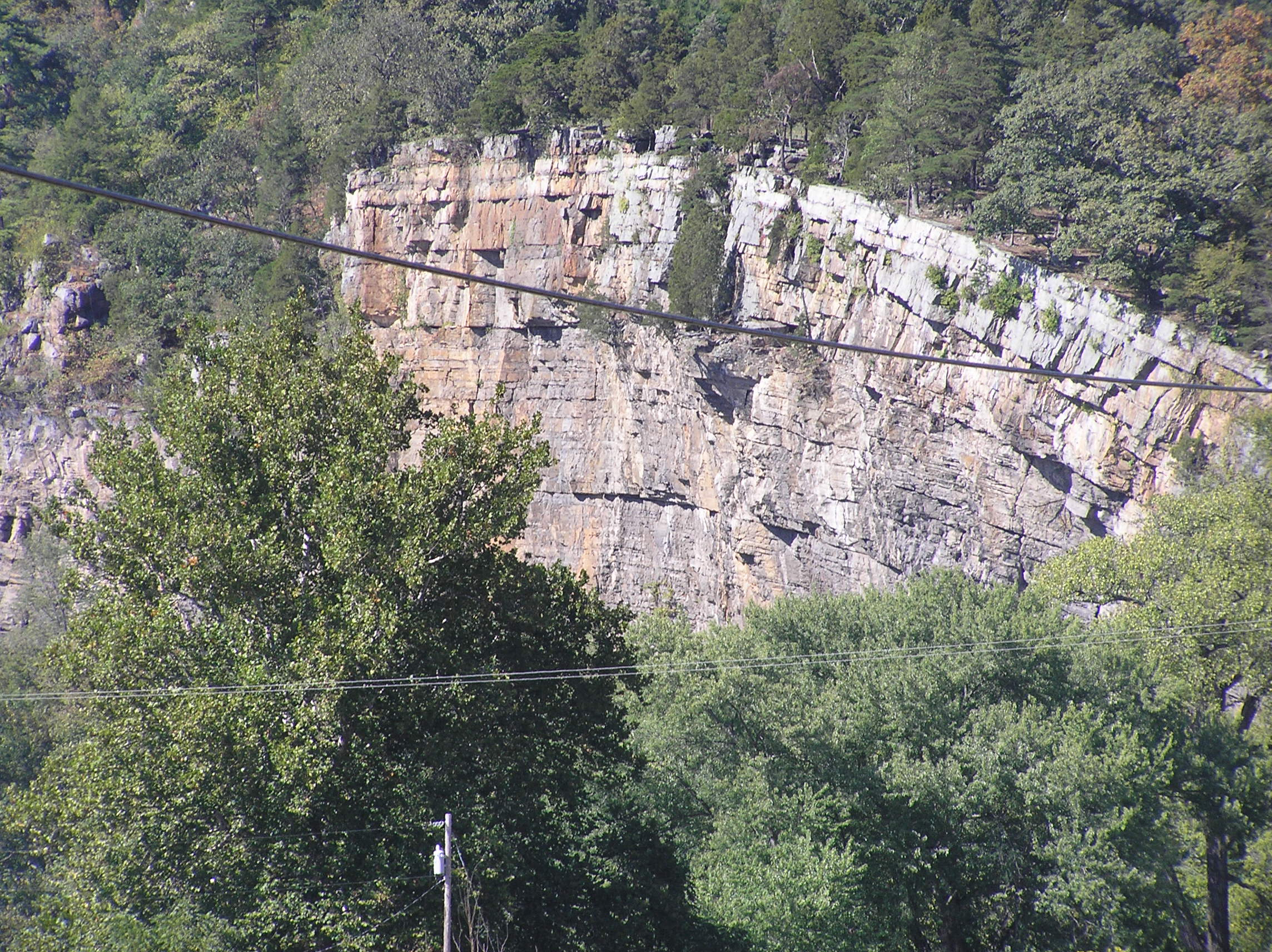
Close-up of Hanging Rocks strata
