= Romney, West Virginia =

City in West Virginia, US

- Town
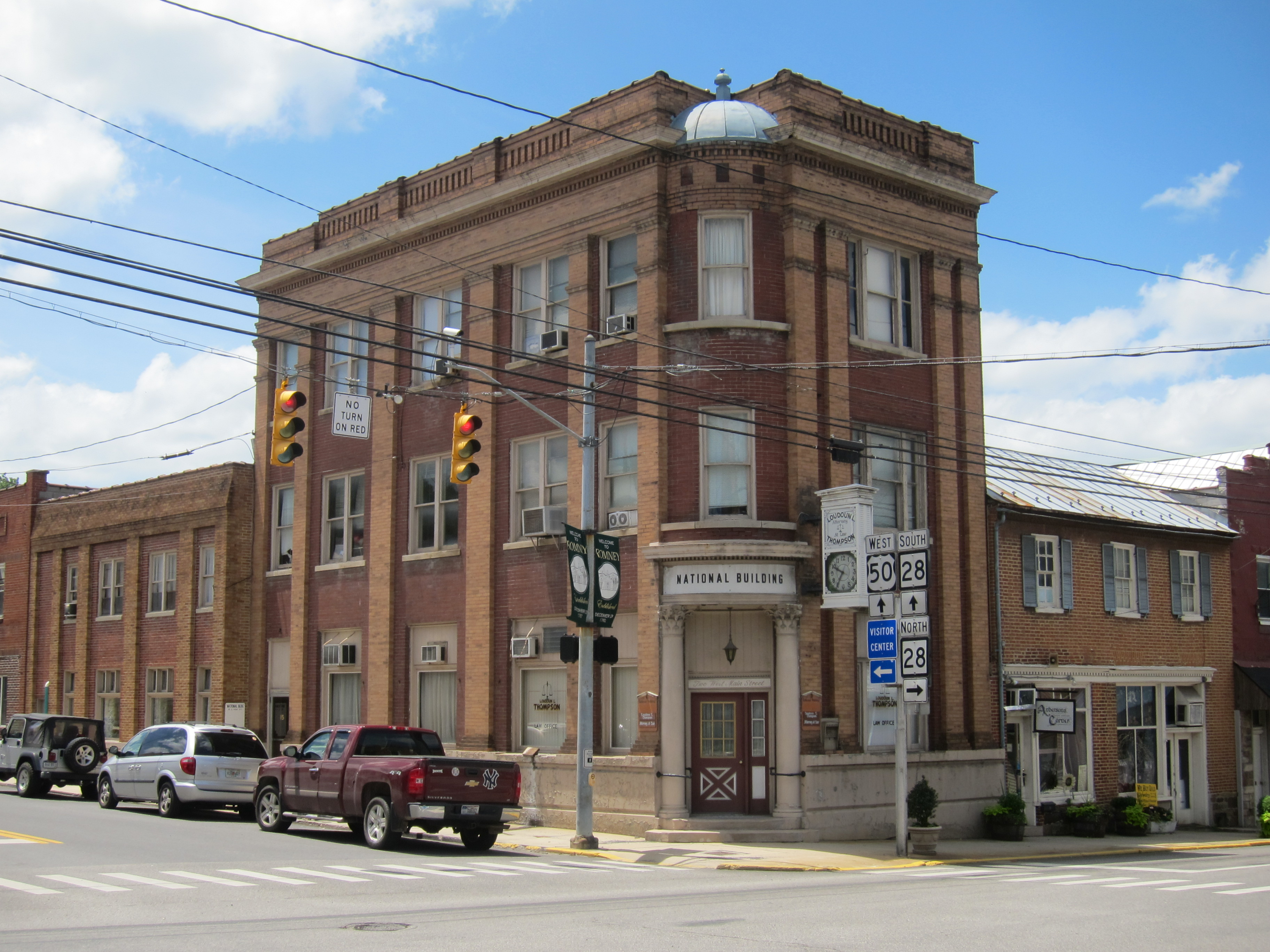
- National Building in downtown Romney
- Motto: "First in West Virginia – Est. 1762"
- Interactive map of Romney, West Virginia
- Location within Romney, West Virginia Location within Eastern Panhandle of West Virginia Location within West Virginia Location within the United States
- Coordinates: 39°20′32″N 78°45′12″W
- Country: United States
- State: West Virginia
- County: Hampshire
- Incorporation: December 23, 1762

Government
  - Type: Mayor–council
  - Body: Romney Town Council
  - Mayor: Beverly C. Keadle (D)

Area
  - Total: 0.96 sq mi (2.49 km^{2})
  - Land: 0.96 sq mi (2.49 km^{2})
  - Water: 0 sq mi (0.00 km^{2})
- Elevation: 804 ft (245 m)

Population (2020)
  - Total: 1,722
  - Estimate (2021): 1,717
  - Density: 1,764.6/sq mi (681.32/km^{2})
- Time zone: UTC-5 (EST)
  - Summer (DST): UTC-4 (EDT)
- ZIP code: 26757
- Area code: 304
- FIPS code: 54-70084
- GNIS feature ID: 2390646
- Website: townofromney.com

Romney is a town in Hampshire County, West Virginia, United States, and its county seat. The population was 1,722 at the 2020 census. It is part of the Winchester, Virginia metropolitan area. The town was established in 1762 along with Shepherdstown; together, they are the two oldest towns in West Virginia.

== History ==
Established by consecutive acts of the Virginia House of Burgesses and approved by the governor on December 23, 1762, Romney and Mecklenburg (later renamed Shepherdstown), in Jefferson County, are the oldest towns in West Virginia. The bill containing the Act for establishing the town of Romney, in the county of Hampshire, and for other purposes therein-mentioned, is listed 20th on a list of approved "publick and private bills" and is immediately followed by An Act for establishing the town of Mecklenburg, in the county of Frederick.

Early 20th Century view of Romney

Originally settled in 1725 by hunters and traders, Romney was known as Pearsall's Flats and was the site of the French and Indian War stockade Fort Pearsall. Named for the Cinque Ports town of Romney, Kent, England, by Thomas Fairfax, 6th Lord Fairfax of Cameron, the town still bears place names and symbols from its colonial past such as its Marsham Street, named for Robert Marsham, 2nd Baron Romney. It is also home to the West Virginia Schools for the Deaf and Blind and the nation's First Confederate Memorial in Indian Mound Cemetery.

Romney Academy was first incorporated by the Virginia General Assembly on January 11, 1814, and was active until 1846 when it was reorganized as the Romney Classical Institute. Romney Academy was one of the earliest institutions for higher learning within the present boundaries of the state of West Virginia. The Romney Classical Institute, a coeducational collegiate preparatory school, survived until 1866. The loss of members due to the American Civil War forced its closure.

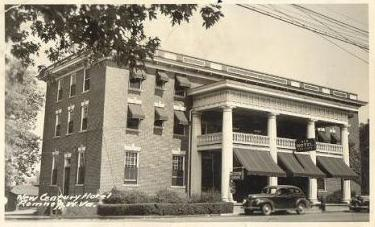
Romney's New Century Hotel, East Main Street, 1948

The Romney Expedition of the Confederate States Army occurred in the early American Civil War. It was part of the preliminary actions of Stonewall Jackson's Valley Campaign as Jackson cleared Union Army troops led by Major General Nathaniel Banks and Brigadier General William S. Rosecrans from the lower Shenandoah Valley and surrounding Allegheny ranges, and then successfully severed the Baltimore and Ohio Railroad and the Chesapeake and Ohio Canal. His army advanced from Winchester towards Cumberland, Maryland, but withdrew after reaching Romney due to harsh winter conditions. Romney was occupied by both Union and Confederate soldiers multiple times throughout the war.

The West Virginia Schools for the Deaf and the Blind was established in 1870 upon the campus of the Romney Classical Institute.

== Geography ==
According to the United States Census Bureau, the city has a total area of 0.96 square miles (2.49 km^{2}), all land.

=== Climate ===
The climate in this area is characterized by hot, humid summers and generally cold winters. According to the Köppen Climate Classification system, Romney has a humid continental climate, abbreviated "Dfa" on climate maps.

Climate data for Romney, West Virginia (1991–2020 normals, extremes 1891–present)
Month	Jan	Feb	Mar	Apr	May	Jun	Jul	Aug	Sep	Oct	Nov	Dec	Year
Record high °F (°C)	79 (26)	85 (29)	94 (34)	101 (38)	101 (38)	104 (40)	107 (42)	109 (43)	104 (40)	98 (37)	85 (29)	80 (27)	109 (43)
Mean daily maximum °F (°C)	40.2 (4.6)	44.2 (6.8)	53.1 (11.7)	66.1 (18.9)	74.6 (23.7)	82.2 (27.9)	86.3 (30.2)	84.8 (29.3)	78.4 (25.8)	67.0 (19.4)	54.7 (12.6)	43.9 (6.6)	64.6 (18.1)
Daily mean °F (°C)	30.5 (−0.8)	33.6 (0.9)	41.2 (5.1)	52.2 (11.2)	61.6 (16.4)	69.7 (20.9)	73.2 (22.9)	72.4 (22.4)	65.4 (18.6)	54.1 (12.3)	42.8 (6.0)	34.4 (1.3)	52.6 (11.4)
Mean daily minimum °F (°C)	20.8 (−6.2)	23.0 (−5.0)	29.4 (−1.4)	38.3 (3.5)	48.6 (9.2)	57.1 (13.9)	61.3 (16.3)	60.0 (15.6)	52.4 (11.3)	41.1 (5.1)	30.9 (−0.6)	25.0 (−3.9)	40.7 (4.8)
Record low °F (°C)	−20 (−29)	−20 (−29)	−4 (−20)	7 (−14)	23 (−5)	29 (−2)	38 (3)	35 (2)	24 (−4)	13 (−11)	−1 (−18)	−15 (−26)	−20 (−29)
Average precipitation inches (mm)	2.41 (61)	2.19 (56)	3.24 (82)	3.36 (85)	3.84 (98)	3.56 (90)	4.72 (120)	3.72 (94)	3.58 (91)	2.84 (72)	2.18 (55)	2.60 (66)	38.24 (971)
Average snowfall inches (cm)	7.0 (18)	9.7 (25)	7.5 (19)	0.1 (0.25)	0.0 (0.0)	0.0 (0.0)	0.0 (0.0)	0.0 (0.0)	0.0 (0.0)	0.0 (0.0)	1.0 (2.5)	3.8 (9.7)	29.1 (74)
Average precipitation days (≥ 0.01 in)	8.6	7.9	9.5	11.5	13.5	11.9	11.0	10.3	9.5	9.0	7.6	7.9	118.2
Average snowy days (≥ 0.1 in)	3.7	3.4	2.1	0.2	0.0	0.0	0.0	0.0	0.0	0.0	0.5	1.6	11.5
Source: NOAA

== Demographics ==
Historical population
Census	Pop.	Note	%±
1850	456		—
1860	569		24.8%
1870	482		−15.3%
1880	371		−23.0%
1890	451		21.6%
1900	580		28.6%
1910	1,112		91.7%
1920	1,028		−7.6%
1930	1,441		40.2%
1940	2,013		39.7%
1950	2,059		2.3%
1960	2,203		7.0%
1970	2,364		7.3%
1980	2,094		−11.4%
1990	1,966		−6.1%
2000	1,940		−1.3%
2010	1,848		−4.7%
2020	1,722		−6.8%
2021 (est.)	1,717		−0.3%
U.S. Decennial Census; 2013 Estimate

=== 2010 census ===
As of the census of 2010, there were 1,848 people, 843 households, and 410 families living in the city. The population density was 1,925.0 inhabitants per square mile (743.2/km^{2}). There were 967 housing units at an average density of 1,007.3 per square mile (388.9/km^{2}). The racial makeup of the city was 95.8% White, 2.7% African American, 0.2% Native American, 0.1% Asian, 0.1% from other races, and 1.1% from two or more races. Hispanic or Latino of any race were 1.4% of the population.

There were 843 households, of which 23.7% had children under the age of 18 living with them, 31.2% were married couples living together, 13.2% had a female householder with no husband present, 4.3% had a male householder with no wife present, and 51.4% were non-families. 46.5% of all households were made up of individuals, and 26.2% had someone living alone who was 65 years of age or older. The average household size was 2.01 and the average family size was 2.83.

The median age in the city was 41.9 years. 23.6% of residents were under the age of 18; 9.4% were between the ages of 18 and 24; 20.3% were from 25 to 44; 23% were from 45 to 64; and 23.6% were 65 years of age or older. The gender makeup of the city was 44.1% male and 55.9% female.

=== 2000 census ===
As of the census of 2000, there were 1,940 people, 884 households, and 454 families living in the city. The population density was 2,114.3 inhabitants per square mile (816.3/km^{2}). There were 974 housing units at an average density of 1,061.5 per square mile (409.8/km^{2}). The racial makeup of the city was 96.91% White, 1.91% African American, 0.05% Native American, 0.52% Asian, 0.21% from other races, and 0.41% from two or more races. Hispanic or Latino of any race were 0.67% of the population.

There were 884 households, out of which 21.7% had children under the age of 18 living with them, 33.7% were married couples living together, 14.6% had a female householder with no husband present, and 48.6% were non-families. 44.8% of all households were made up of individuals, and 26.8% had someone living alone who was 65 years of age or older. The average household size was 1.97 and the average family size was 2.72.

In the city, the population was spread out, with 25.2% under the age of 18, 7.4% from 18 to 24, 20.1% from 25 to 44, 21.3% from 45 to 64, and 26.1% who were 65 years of age or older. The median age was 42 years. For every 100 females, there were 76.2 males. For every 100 females age 18 and over, there were 68.5 males.

The median income for a household in the city was $22,261, and the median income for a family was $34,271. Males had a median income of $28,667 versus $20,000 for females. The per capita income for the city was $15,765. About 17.2% of families and 24.6% of the population were below the poverty line, including 29.5% of those under age 18 and 18.2% of those age 65 or over.

== Schools and recreation ==
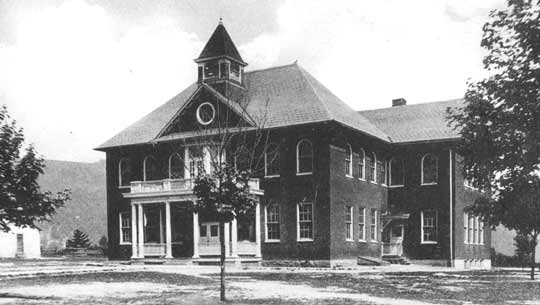
Old Romney High School, originally Romney Public School.

- Hampshire High School Sports Complex, US Route 50 East
  - Baseball Field, Cross Country Trails, Running Track, Soccer Field, Softball Field
- Hampshire Park & 4-H Camp, South Branch River Road (CR 8)
  - Picnic Pavilions, Baseball Field, Basketball Court, Volleyball Court, Tennis Courts
- Old Romney High School, 111 School Street
  - Baseball Field, Basketball Courts, Football Field, Running Track
- Romney Recreation Center, 260 School Street
  - Swimming Facilities
- West Virginia Schools for the Deaf and Blind Grounds, East Main Street
  - Baseball Field, Basketball Courts, Picnic Pavilions, Running Track, Soccer Field, Swimming Facilities
- Potomac Eagle Scenic Railroad 149 Eagle Dr.
  - Provides scenic train service out of its terminal in the town.

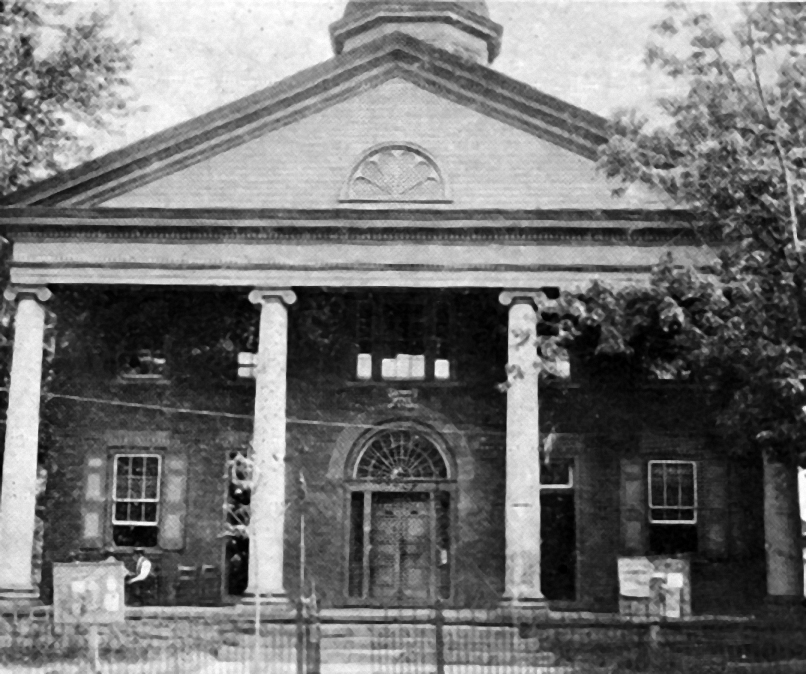
The old Hampshire County Courthouse, built in 1833

== Government ==
Romney is governed by a Mayor–council government. As of 2022, the mayor was Beverly C. Keadle, and the council members were Duncan Hott, John Duncan III, Paula O’Brien, Robin Pancake, Savanna Morgret and William Taylor.

== Transportation ==
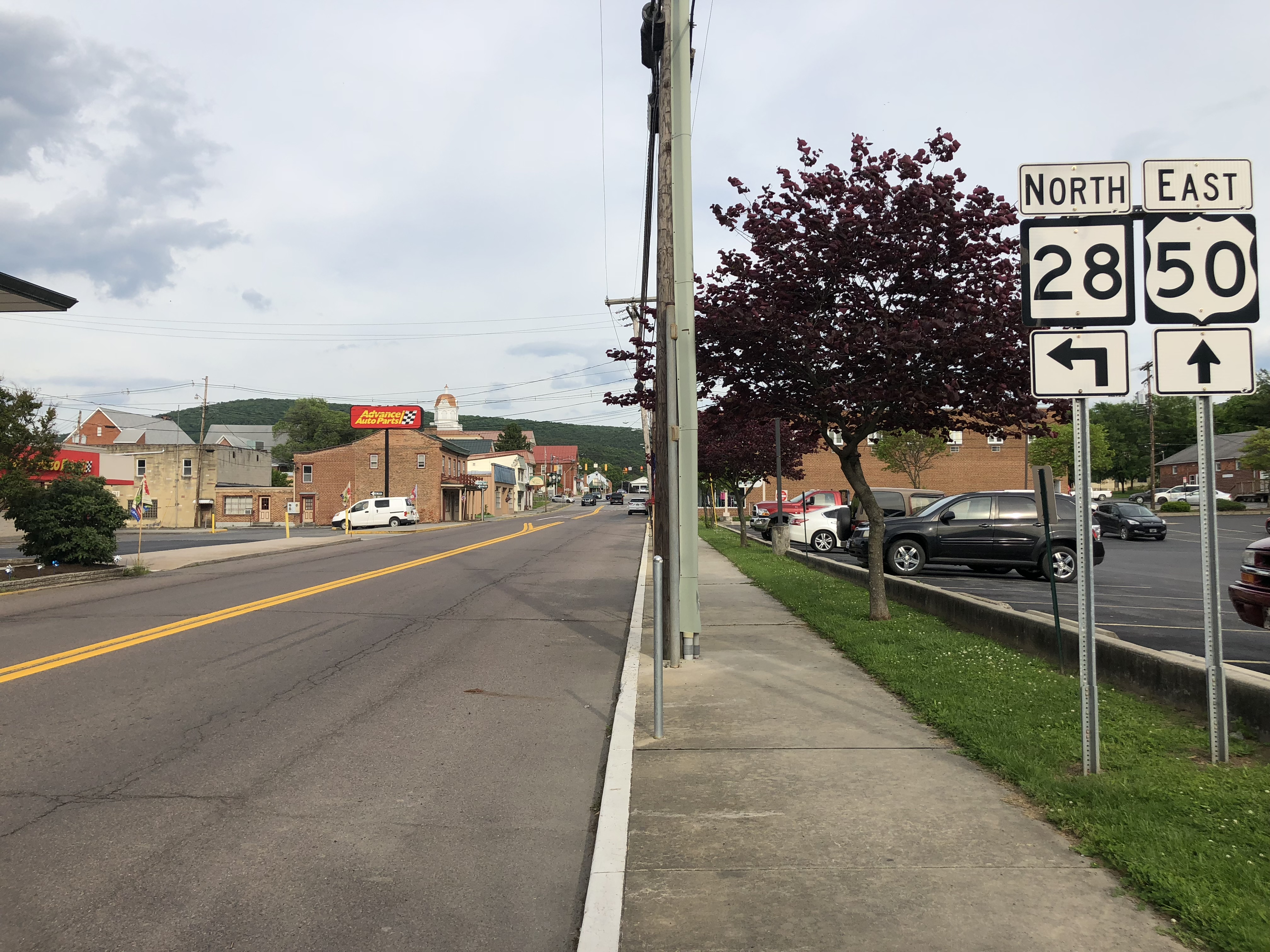
US 50 and WV 28 run concurrently for short stretch within and southwest of Romney

=== Roadways ===
Romney is served by two primary highways, the more prominent of them being U.S. Route 50. US 50 heads eastward from Romney towards Winchester and Interstate 81. To the west, US 50 intersects U.S. Route 220, climbs the Allegheny Front, briefly enters Garrett County, Maryland, and then returns to West Virginia, eventually reaching Grafton. The other primary highway serving Romney is West Virginia Route 28, which heads southward towards Moorefield and north towards Cumberland, Maryland and Interstate 68.

=== Public transportation ===
The Potomac Valley Transit Authority serves Romney with fixed bus routes 101, 103, and 105. The agency also provides on demand transit for the town via bus route 302.

== Notable people ==
- Stephen Ailes, 8th United States Secretary of the Army
- James Dillon Armstrong, state legislator and circuit court judge
- William Armstrong, U.S. Representative
- John Rinehart Blue, state legislator
- William C. Clayton, state legislator
- Edna Brady Cornwell, First Lady of West Virginia
- John J. Cornwell, 15th Governor of West Virginia
- William B. Cornwell, lawyer and businessman
- John Collins Covell, principal of the West Virginia Schools for the Deaf and Blind
- Samuel Lightfoot Flournoy, state legislator
- Samuel Lightfoot Flournoy, lawyer
- Henry Bell Gilkeson, state legislator and principal of the West Virginia Schools for the Deaf and Blind
- Ken Hechler, former Democratic member of the United State House of Representatives for West Virginia's 4th congressional district and a former Secretary of State of West Virginia.
- Howard Hille Johnson, founder of the West Virginia Schools for the Deaf and Blind
- James Sloan Kuykendall, state legislator
- Charles S. Lawrence, Institute of Food Technologists Executive Vice President
- Thomas Bryan Martin, colonial-era Virginia politician
- Angus William McDonald, Confederate States Army colonel
- Marshall McDonald, United States Fish Commissioner
- Jerry Mezzatesta, state legislator
- Alexander W. Monroe, Speaker of the West Virginia House of Delegates
- Samuel Mulledy, academic
- Thomas Mulledy, academic
- Ann Pancake, author
- Chet Pancake, filmmaker
- Sam Pancake, actor
- Isaac Parsons, state legislator
- Isaac Parsons, Confederate military officer and politician
- Lee Hawse Patteson, First Lady of West Virginia
- David Shear, Romney mayor and businessperson
- Randall Terry, anti-abortion activist
- Christian Streit White, local politician
- John Baker White, local politician
- John Baker White, West Virginia Board of Control member
- Robert White, Attorney General of West Virginia
- Robert White, state legislator
- Charles M. Williams, Harvard Business School professor
- Andrew Wodrow, local politician
- Joshua Soule Zimmerman, state legislator
