= Hampshire County Schools =

School district in West Virginia, United States

Address
- 61 Pancione Loop Augusta, West Virginia, 26704; United States
- Coordinates: 39°17′34.6″N 78°38′26.1″W

District information
- Type: School district
- Grades: PK–12
- Superintendent: George "Russ" Collett
- Schools: 8
- NCES District ID: 5400420

Students and staff
- Students: 2,735 (2023–24)
- Teachers: 210.14 (on an FTE basis)
- Student–teacher ratio: 13.02

Other information
- Website: boe.hampshire.k12.wv.us

Hampshire County Schools is the operating school district within Hampshire County, West Virginia, United States. The Hampshire County Board of Education governs the school district.

== Schools ==
=== Current schools ===
School name	Location	Est.	Type	Grades	Mascot	Colors	Notes
Capon Bridge Elementary School	Capon Bridge		Elementary	PK–5	Hawk	Purple and gold	
Capon Bridge Middle School	Capon Bridge		Middle	6–8	Bobcat	Black and orange	Formerly housed in the building used by the former Capon Bridge High School and Capon Bridge Junior High School, the school's current building was opened in January 2007.
Hampshire High School	Romney	1964	High	9–12	Trojan	Green and white	
Ice Mountain Elementary School	Slanesville	2025	Elementary	PK–5	Honey bee	Navy, Carolina blue, gray, and white	Ice Mountain formally opened in January 2025, replacing Slanesville Elementary School.
Romney Middle School	Romney		Middle	6–8	Pioneer	Blue and gray	Formerly housed in the building used by the former Romney High School and Romney Junior High School, the school's current building was opened in December 2004.
South Branch Elementary School	Romney	2025	Elementary	PK–5	Black bear	Blue and green	South Branch formally opened in February 2025, replacing John J. Cornwell Elementary School, Romney Elementary School, and Springfield–Green Spring Elementary School.
Windy Ridge Elementary School	Augusta	2024	Elementary	PK–5	Honey bee	Blue, yellow, and black	Windy Ridge formally opened in December 2024, replacing Augusta Elementary School.

=== Career training centers ===
- Hampshire County Career Training Center, Romney

== Former schools ==
- Augusta Elementary School, Augusta
- Capon Bridge High School, Capon Bridge
- Capon Bridge Junior High School, Capon Bridge
- Grassy Lick Elementary School, Kirby
- Green Spring Elementary School, Green Spring
- Hoy Grade School, Hoy
- John J. Cornwell Elementary School, Levels
- Levels Elementary School, Levels
- Mill Creek Elementary School, Purgitsville
- Rio Elementary School, Rio
- Romney Colored School, Romney
- Romney Elementary School, Romney
- Romney High School, Romney
- Romney Junior High School, Romney
- Slanesville Elementary School, Slanesville
- Springfield Elementary School, Springfield
- Springfield–Green Spring Elementary School, Springfield
