= Samuel Lightfoot Flournoy (lawyer) =

American lawyer and politician

- Born: Samuel Lightfoot Flournoy; January 17, 1886; Romney, West Virginia, United States
- Died: May 17, 1961 (aged 75); Kanawha Valley Memorial Hospital, Charleston, West Virginia, United States
- Resting place: Spring Hill Cemetery
- Education: Fishburne Military School; Hampden–Sydney College; West Virginia University College of Law
- Occupations: lawyer, politician
- Political party: Democratic Party
- Board member of: Charleston Civil Service Board
- Spouse: Sarah Katharine Cotton Flournoy
- Children: 2
- Parent(s): Samuel Lightfoot Flournoy (father); Frances "Fannie" Ann Armstrong White (mother)
- Relatives: John Baker White (grandfather); Robert White (uncle); Christian Streit White (uncle); John Baker White (first cousin); Robert White (first cousin)

Samuel Lightfoot Flournoy (January 17, 1886 – May 17, 1961) was an American lawyer and politician in the U.S. state of West Virginia. He was a prominent lawyer in Charleston, where he practiced law for over 50 years. Born in Romney in 1886, Flournoy was the son of West Virginia State Senator Samuel Lightfoot Flournoy. Flournoy was a grandson of Hampshire County Clerk of Court John Baker White and a nephew of West Virginia Attorney General Robert White and West Virginia Fish Commission President Christian Streit White. He was also a relative of Thomas Flournoy, United States Representative from Virginia.

Flournoy relocated with his family to Charleston in 1890 during his father's second West Virginia Senate term. Flournoy was educated at Fishburne Military School, Hampden–Sydney College, and West Virginia University College of Law. He was admitted to the Kanawha County bar in 1911 and at various times during his law career, Flournoy was appointed special master, arbitrator, or commissioner for several high-profile court cases. In 1935, Flournoy was an unsuccessful Democratic candidate for an at-large seat on the Charleston City Council. In 1937, Flournoy was selected by Governor Homer A. Holt as a member of the Charleston Civil Service Board, which regulated the appointments of police and fire personnel. Flournoy served as an incorporator of the New Homes Corporation of Charleston in 1931 and was later president of the Mortgage Exchange Corporation. He was involved in the establishment of a local mortgage business association in 1952. Flournoy died in Charleston in 1961.

== Early life and education ==
Samuel Lightfoot Flournoy was born on January 7, 1886, in Romney, West Virginia. He was the son of West Virginia State Senator Samuel Lightfoot Flournoy and his wife Frances "Fannie" Ann Armstrong White. Through his mother, Flournoy was a grandson of Hampshire County Clerk of Court John Baker White and a nephew of West Virginia Attorney General Robert White and West Virginia Fish Commission President Christian Streit White. Through his father, he was a relative of Thomas Flournoy, United States Representative from Virginia. Flournoy was of English and French ancestry through his father, and of Scottish and Swiss ancestry through his mother.

In 1890, during his father's second term in the West Virginia Senate, Flournoy and his family relocated from Romney to Charleston, where his father continued practicing law after his resignation from the senate.

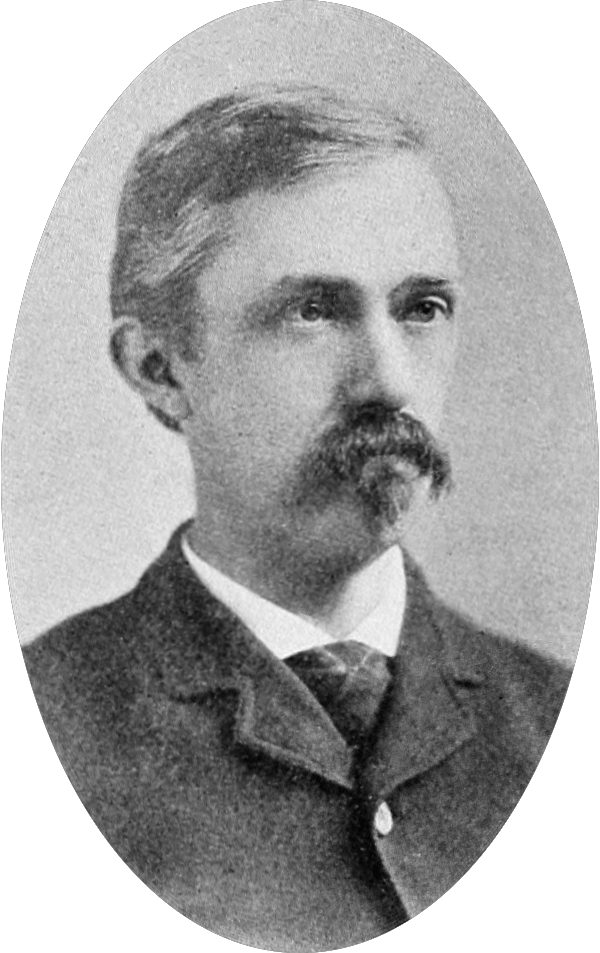
Flournoy's father, Samuel Lightfoot Flournoy

Flournoy received his primary education at Fishburne Military School in Waynesboro, Virginia. Following his graduation from the military school, he received his secondary education at his father's alma mater Hampden–Sydney College in Hampden Sydney, Virginia, and went on to study jurisprudence at the West Virginia University College of Law in Morgantown, West Virginia. Flournoy was a member of the Chi Phi fraternity.

== Career ==
=== Law career ===
Flournoy became a member of the Kanawha County bar in 1911 and commenced the practice of law in Charleston. Flournoy was a partner in the Charleston law firm of Flournoy and Porter, where he practiced law for over 50 years.

At various times during his law career, Flournoy was appointed special master, arbitrator, or commissioner for several high-profile court cases. In 1932, Flournoy was appointed special master in a suit involving the estate of Mercy J. Keller, the widow of Benjamin Franklin Keller, a judge for the United States District Court for the Southern District of West Virginia. Flournoy authored a report allowing for the distribution of funds to Keller's heirs and beneficiaries from Charleston National Bank. In December 1932, Flournoy provided mediation for several business and home owners who sued the city of Charleston over the widening of Virginia Street between Summers and Capitol Streets. He was unable to attend one of the lawsuit mediation conferences due to an ankle injury. In addition to his role as a special master and mediator, Flournoy was also selected to serve as a special commissioner in several Charleston lawsuits.

Flournoy continued to expand his law practice by winning large contracts. In March 1933, he offered the lowest bid of $3,745 for a contract that supplied certificates of land title in Kanawha and Fayette counties within the Huntington federal engineering district. The lands within the federal engineering district were to be utilized by the Federal government for river work.

=== Political career ===
In 1935, Flournoy was a West Virginia Democratic Party candidate for an at-large seat on the Charleston City Council. Flournoy actively campaigned for the at-large seat, and spoke to several local organizations, including the First Ward Negro Democratic Club and Beck's Mission on Charleston's West Side. Flournoy was ultimately unsuccessful in his bid for election to the at-large city council seat.

During a controversial re-indexing of Kanawha County records by Works Progress Administration officials in 1935 and 1936, Flournoy served as chairman of the Charleston Bar Association's Re-Indexing Committee, which completed an independent investigation of the re-indexing progress, as ordered by the bar association's executive committee. Under Flournoy's leadership, the committee completed its review in January 1936.

In 1937, Flournoy was appointed by West Virginia Governor Homer A. Holt as an at-large member of Charleston's Civil Service Board, which had been empowered by an act of the West Virginia Legislature to regulate the appointment of police and fire personnel in Charleston. While serving on the board, Flournoy was its president and spokesperson.

=== Business career ===
On July 14, 1931, Flournoy was an incorporator of the New Homes Corporation of Charleston, a building and construction firm, which was headquartered in the Davidson Building and was chartered with a capital stock value of $50,000. Flournoy was later president of the Mortgage Exchange Corporation of Charleston. In his role as president of the Mortgage Exchange Corporation, Flournoy was involved in the establishment of a local association of mortgage businesspeople in February 1952. Flournoy was named by the association as one of three men appointed to the by-laws committee.

== Later life and death ==
At the time of his appointment to the Charleston Civil Services Board, Flournoy resided at 8 California Avenue near the West Virginia Capitol Complex in Charleston. He later relocated to 4100 Kanawha Avenue SE in Charleston's Kanawha City neighborhood, where he resided at the time of his death.

Flournoy died of idiopathic pulmonary fibrosis at the age of 75 on May 17, 1961, at Kanawha Valley Memorial Hospital in Charleston following a prolonged illness. He was survived by his wife, his son, and his sister Frances Flournoy Preston. Flournoy's funeral services were held at the Barlow-Bonsall Funeral Home and his family requested that memorial donations be made to Marmet Hospital in his honor. He was interred at Spring Hill Cemetery in Charleston on May 19, 1961.

At the opening of the September 1961 term of the Kanawha County Circuit Court, Flournoy was eulogized by Kanawha County Bar Association member Roy M. Sams.

== Personal life ==
Flournoy married Sarah Katharine Cotton in Charleston in 1913. He and Katharine had two children, one son and one daughter:

- Samuel Lightfoot Flournoy Jr. (March 23, 1924 – December 27, 2014), married Virginia McManaway Cox of Thaxton, Virginia on June 14, 1964
- Nancy Margaret Cotton Flournoy Moore, married Webster Hamilton Moore of Greensboro, North Carolina, on December 3, 1949

Flournoy was a practicing Presbyterian and was a member of the Ruffner Memorial Presbyterian Church in Charleston.

== Bibliography ==
- Evans, Clement Anselm (1899). Confederate Military History, Volume II. Atlanta, Georgia: Confederate Publishing Company. Archived from the original on September 28, 2013 – via Wikisource.
- Maxwell, Hu; Swisher, Howard Llewellyn (1897). History of Hampshire County, West Virginia From Its Earliest Settlement to the Present. Morgantown, West Virginia: A. Brown Boughner, Printer. OCLC 680931891. OL 23304577M.
- Miller, Thomas Condit; Maxwell, Hu (1913). West Virginia and Its People, Volume 2. New York City: Lewis Historical Publishing Company. OCLC 1449151. Archived from the original on May 27, 2016 – via Google Books.
- Sprague, William Buell (1869). Annals of the American Pulpit, Or, Commemorative Notices of Distinguished American Clergymen of Various Denominations: From the Early Settlement of the Country to the Close of the Year Eighteen Hundred and Fifty-five: with Historical Introductions, Volume 9. New York City: Robert Carter & Brothers. OCLC 839292. Archived from the original on May 5, 2016 – via Google Books.
- Virginia Historical Society (1899). The Virginia Magazine of History and Biography, Published Quarterly by the Virginia Historical Society, for the Year Ending June, 1899. Volume VI. Richmond, Virginia: William Ellis Jones, Printer. Archived from the original on June 24, 2016 – via Google Books.
- West Virginia Legislature (1889). Acts of the Legislature of West Virginia, at Its Nineteenth Regular Session, Commencing January 9, 1888. Charleston, West Virginia: Moses W. Donnally, Public Printer. OCLC 422695120. Archived from the original on May 19, 2016 – via Google Books.
