= Samuel Lightfoot Flournoy (politician) =

American politician and lawyer (1846–1904)

Honorable Samuel Lightfoot Flournoy
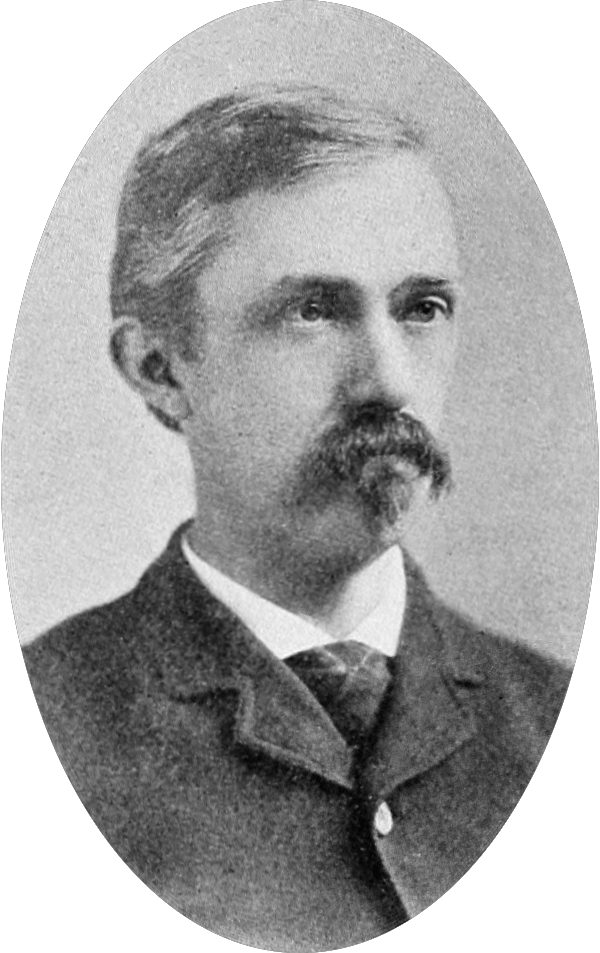

Member of the West Virginia Senate from the 12th district
- In office 1885–1890 Serving with George Edmund Price
- Preceded by: Joseph Van Meter
- Succeeded by: Henry Bell Gilkeson

Personal details
- Born: November 25, 1846 Chesterfield County, Virginia, United States
- Died: January 28, 1904 (aged 57) Orlando, Florida, United States
- Party: Democratic Party
- Spouse: Frances "Fannie" Ann Armstrong White
- Relations: Richard W. Flournoy (father); Sarah Parke Poindexter Flournoy (mother); John Baker White (father-in-law); Christian Streit White (brother-in-law); Robert White (brother-in-law); John Baker White (nephew); Robert White (nephew)
- Children: Richard Parke Flournoy; Harry Lightfoot Flournoy; Frances T. Flournoy Preston; Robert Baker Flournoy; Samuel Lightfoot Flournoy; Alexander White Flournoy
- Education: Hampden–Sydney College (B.A.)
- Profession: lawyer, politician, businessperson

Military service
- Allegiance: Confederate States of America
- Branch/service: Confederate States Army
- Years of service: 1863–1865 (CSA)
- Rank: private
- Unit: Company A, Otey Battery; 13th Battalion Virginia Light Artillery
- Battles/wars: American Civil War

Samuel Lightfoot Flournoy (November 25, 1846 – January 28, 1904) was an American lawyer, politician, and businessperson in the U.S. state of West Virginia. Flournoy served as a state senator representing the 12th Senatorial District in the West Virginia Senate (1885–1890) and served three terms as mayor of Romney, West Virginia. Flournoy unsuccessfully ran as a candidate for the West Virginia Democratic Party gubernatorial nomination in 1900.

Flournoy was born in 1846 in Chesterfield County, Virginia. In 1863, during the American Civil War, he enlisted as a private in the Confederate States Army and served until the war's end in 1865. After graduating from Hampden–Sydney College in 1868, Flournoy taught school for four years while studying law. In 1870 he relocated to Romney, West Virginia, where he served as principal of the Potomac Academy. He was admitted to the bar in 1873, and afterward served on the Board of Regents for the West Virginia Schools for the Deaf and Blind (1876–1880). During his second term in the West Virginia Senate, Flournoy relocated to Charleston to practice law. He also engaged in several business ventures and was an incorporator of the Bank of Romney, the Tug and Guyandotte Railroad Company, the Bradford Building Company, the White Oak Mining Company, and the West Construction Company. Flournoy served on the Board of Trustees of Hampden–Sydney College from 1892 until his death in 1904.

Through his marriage to Frances "Fannie" Ann Armstrong White, Flournoy was a brother-in-law of West Virginia Attorney General Robert White and West Virginia Fish Commission President Christian Streit White, and the son-in-law of Hampshire County Clerk of Court John Baker White. Through his father, Flournoy was a relative of Thomas Flournoy, United States Representative from Virginia. Flournoy was the father of prominent Charleston lawyer Samuel Lightfoot Flournoy.

== Early life and military career ==
Samuel Lightfoot Flournoy was born on November 25, 1846, in Chesterfield County, Virginia, 7 miles (11 km) from Richmond, and was the son of Richard W. Flournoy and his wife, Sarah Parke Poindexter Flournoy. He had four siblings, two brothers and two sisters: Reverend Parke Poindexter Flournoy, Eliza Flournoy Ayler, Richard W. Flournoy, and Ellen Flournoy Thornton. Flournoy was of English and French ancestry. He was a relative of Thomas Flournoy, United States Representative from Virginia. The majority of Flournoy's youth and early adulthood were spent in Richmond, where he attended the city's public schools.

In 1863, during the American Civil War, Flournoy enlisted as a private in the Confederate States Army at the age of 17. He served the entirety of his enlistment in Company A, Otey Battery, 13th Battalion, Virginia Light Artillery in Richmond, throughout the course of the war until its end in 1865.

== Education and teaching career ==
Following the war, Flournoy entered Hampden–Sydney College in Hampden Sydney, Virginia, to pursue an education in classical studies. His elder brother Parke Poindexter Flournoy had been an assistant professor at the college during the war. Flournoy graduated with honors and a Bachelor of Arts from Hampden–Sydney College in 1868 and received the Speaker's Medal from the institution's Philanthropic Debating Society. While attending Hampden–Sydney College, he was a member of the Beta Theta Pi fraternity. Following graduation, Flournoy taught school for four years while studying law. Around 1870 he relocated to Romney, West Virginia, where he took charge as principal and taught at the Potomac Academy with "considerable success" and continued his law studies. Flournoy was admitted to the bar in Romney in January 1873.

== Law and political careers ==
=== Romney law practice ===
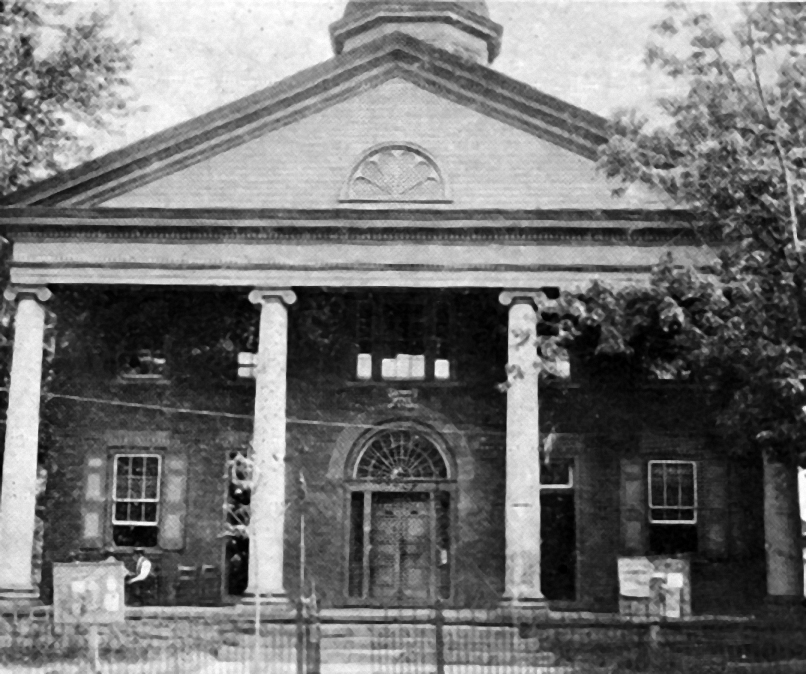
Hampshire County Courthouse in Romney

Following his admission to the bar, Flournoy immediately began practicing law in Romney and "won merited distinction" in his field. He became a prominent leader in the community and was elected as a member of the Romney Literary Society. Flournoy served on the fourth Board of Regents of the West Virginia Schools for the Deaf and Blind from 1876 to 1880. He served three terms as mayor of Romney. As his law career prospered, Flournoy was active in the establishment of The Society of the Ex-Confederate Soldiers in Hampshire County. The society's missions were to obtain an accurate roster of Confederate veterans and to collect and preserve materials to maintain a "truthful" history of the American Civil War. Flournoy and a group of Confederate veterans met at the Hampshire County Courthouse in Romney on July 31, 1883, where he was appointed secretary of the society. The society's constitution was presented at its first annual reunion on September 5, 1883, at which time Flournoy was officially titled as the society's corresponding secretary. Alexander W. Monroe was among the society's three concurrently-serving vice presidents.

=== West Virginia Senate ===
Flournoy was elected to represent the 12th Senatorial District, consisting of Grant, Hampshire, Hardy, Mineral, and Pendleton counties, in the West Virginia Senate in 1885 and was re-elected to the seat in 1889. In the West Virginia state senatorial election on November 6, 1888, Flournoy defeated his Republican challenger S. G. Pownall with 5,578 votes to Pownall's 4,028 votes. Following his election, Flournoy was selected as part of West Virginia's attending delegation to the inauguration of President Benjamin Harrison. In his first term in the West Virginia Senate, Flournoy served as chairman of the Judiciary Committee, and in his second term he served as chairman of the Committee on Counties and Municipal Corporations. Throughout his two terms, Flournoy served on the committees of Privileges and Elections, Federal Relations, Immigration and Agriculture, and Public Printing. In 1890, during his second term in the West Virginia Senate, Flournoy relocated from Romney to Charleston and continued practicing law there. He resigned from his senate seat in 1890.

=== Charleston law practice ===
In Charleston, in 1891, Flournoy founded the law firm Couch, Flournoy and Price with former West Virginia Senate President, George Edmund Price. The firm would later become Flournoy, Price, and Smith with the addition of Harrison Brooks Smith in 1894. On March 7, 1892, Flournoy and his partner Price were admitted to practice before the Supreme Court of the United States. Flournoy and Price continued to expand their law practice into Southern West Virginia when they were admitted to the bar of Summers County in 1894.

In April 1897, while practicing law in Charleston, Flournoy became qualified to practice law at the bar of Tazewell County, Virginia. As a Charleston lawyer, Flournoy represented both plaintiffs and defendants involved in suits over coalfield land titles in Southern West Virginia and Southwest Virginia. From 1900 to 1901, Flournoy represented the defendant Henry C. King in a widely publicized case involving claim to a land title of 500,000 acres (2,000 km^{2}) spanning counties in Southern West Virginia and Southwest Virginia in the United States Circuit Court of Appeals. In 1901, Flournoy represented S. J. Ritchie of Akron, Ohio, in the Tazewell County Court, where his client claimed a large land tract of valuable coalfields spanning Tazewell County and McDowell County, West Virginia.

=== Gubernatorial candidacy ===
In early April 1900, a movement among prominent West Virginia Democratic Party members in Charleston began to coalesce around Flournoy in support of his candidacy for West Virginia governor. Flournoy was considered a William Jennings Bryan Democrat with conservative positions, and Charleston Democrats felt he would receive wide support and would not antagonize corporations. Flournoy took the matter under advisement and on April 25, 1900, he announced his candidacy for West Virginia governor. In his announcement, Flournoy stated that he was unwilling to engage in a heated contest for the nomination and that he would be content with the outcome of the Democratic Party state convention, no matter the decision. He further stated that he trusted the state convention would craft a ticket that would command the support of the people of West Virginia. Following his announcement, the Spirit of Jefferson newspaper in Charles Town stated of Flournoy on May 1, 1900: "Mr. Flournoy is a most estimable gentleman, well and favorably known here, would doubtless make an excellent governor, and as the nominee of the Democratic party would receive a hearty support in the Eastern panhandle." Flournoy also received the support of the Democratic Party in Mineral County in May 1900.

At the West Virginia Democratic Party State Convention held in Parkersburg on June 6, 1900, Flournoy competed for the party's nomination for gubernatorial candidacy against Lewis N. Tavenner of Parkersburg, John H. Holt of Huntington, and Virgil G. Lewis of Mason City. Prior to the convention, Daniel B. Lucas of Jefferson County had been a candidate for nomination. Holt won the Democratic Party's nomination on the first ballot, but lost in the general election to Republican candidate Albert B. White. Flournoy and Lewis each received just one vote while Holt received 483 and Tavenner received 450 votes.

=== West Virginia Bar Association ===
Flournoy was present at the first meeting of the West Virginia Bar Association held on the date of its organization on July 8, 1886, in Grafton. As a member, Flournoy was appointed to draft the association's constitution and by-laws and served on its executive committee. In addition to serving as a vice president of the association, Flournoy also represented the 12th Judicial Circuit on the association's Committee on Judicial Administration and Legal Reform and later served on the Committee of Admissions. On January 7, 1892, Flournoy was elected as the association's vice president for West Virginia's 3rd congressional district.

== Business pursuits ==
In addition to his law practice and political pursuits, Flournoy also engaged in several business ventures. On August 4, 1888, he purchased five shares priced at $100 each in order to invest in and provide capital stock for the incorporation of the Bank of Romney. Along with Harrison B. Smith and fellow state senator George E. Price, Flournoy again served as an incorporator on April 25, 1901, when the Tug and Guyandotte Railroad Company was granted its charter with $100,000 in capital. The Tug and Guyandotte Railroad was constructed between the Norfolk and Western Railway at Davy and Baileysville to facilitate the transportation of coal. Flournoy, Price, and Flournoy's son Richard Parke Flournoy were incorporators of the Bradford Building Company which was chartered with capital of $20,000 on September 25, 1901, with the purpose of engaging in general building and construction projects.

The following year, on December 20, 1902, Flournoy, Price, and their law partner Smith were also incorporators of the White Oak Mining Company and of the West Construction Company. With an authorized capital stock of $100,000, the White Oak Mining Company, that was engaged in the mining, shipment, and sale of coal, the cutting and sawing of timber, and the operations and sales of railway, telephone, and telegraph lines and networks. The West Construction Company, based in Chattanooga, Tennessee, was a general contracting and construction firm also involved in the operation and maintenance of railway, telephone, and telegraph lines.

== Personal life ==
=== Marriage and children ===
On April 10, 1875, in Hampshire County, Flournoy married Frances "Fannie" Ann Armstrong White (April 10, 1844 – February 25, 1922), the daughter of Hampshire County Clerk of Court John Baker White and his wife Frances Ann Streit White. Frances White's brother, Robert White, served as West Virginia Attorney General, and her brother Christian Streit White served as President of the West Virginia Fish Commission. Flournoy and his wife Frances had six children (five sons and one daughter):

- Richard Parke Flournoy (December 29, 1875 – May 5, 1959)
- Harry Lightfoot Flournoy (March 4, 1878 – December 31, 1954)
- Frances T. Flournoy Preston, married James M. Preston of Lewisburg, West Virginia
- Robert Baker Flournoy (October 10, 1882 – July 25, 1883)
- Samuel Lightfoot Flournoy (January 7, 1886 – May 17, 1961), married Sarah Katharine Cotton
- Alexander White Flournoy (March 15, 1887 – March 16, 1958), married Anne Cary Gravatt

=== Religious activities ===
Flournoy was active in the Presbyterian Church in Hampshire County and served as a trustee for the Presbytery of Winchester, along with Henry Bell Gilkeson. In 1881, Flournoy and his fellow trustees were instrumental in securing from Amos L. and Allie G. Pugh a house and a large partially wooded lot in Capon Bridge for use by the Presbytery as a centrally located manse in Hampshire County. Flournoy was elected as a deacon in the Presbyterian Church in 1879 and remained a trustee of the Presbytery of Winchester until 1891 when he relocated to Charleston. Following his move to Charleston, Flournoy became a member of the First Presbyterian Church and served as one of seven church elders there.

=== Later life and death ===
Flounoy died as a result of throat and pulmonary illnesses on January 28, 1904, at 2:40 a.m. in Orlando, Florida, where he had traveled to restore his failing health. His wife and his physician Dr. Henry were at his side at the time of his death. Flournoy was survived by his wife, and five of his children.

He served on the Board of Trustees of Hampden–Sydney College from 1892 until his death. A tribute to Flournoy was rendered by college president Richard McIlwaine at a meeting of the Hampden–Sydney College trustees on June 13, 1904.

Following his death, The Weekly Register newspaper in Point Pleasant remarked that Flournoy "was one of the prominent [Democratic] leaders of the state, and occupied a high place in the estimation [of] the party followers". The Times-Dispatch of Richmond stated that Flournoy "was one of the best known members of the bar" of Charleston and described his service during the American Civil War as gallant.

== Bibliography ==
- Atkinson, George Wesley (1919). Bench and Bar of West Virginia. Charleston, West Virginia: Virginia Law Book Company. OCLC 8899470. Archived from the original on April 27, 2016 – via Google Books.
- Atkinson, George Wesley; Gibbens, Alvaro Franklin (1890). Prominent Men of West Virginia: Biographical Sketches of Representative Men in Every Honorable Vocation, Including Politics, the Law, Theology, Medicine, Education, Finance, Journalism, Trade, Commerce and Agriculture. Wheeling, West Virginia: W. L. Callin. OCLC 3886825 – via Internet Archive.
- Brown, James T. (1917). Catalogue of Beta Theta Pi, Ninth Edition. New York City: James T. Brown. OCLC 11748677. Archived from the original on April 30, 2016 – via Google Books.
- Evans, Clement Anselm (1899). Confederate Military History, Volume II. Atlanta: Confederate Publishing Company. OCLC 951143. Archived from the original on September 28, 2013 – via Wikisource.
- Henneman, J. B. (January 1899a). "Trustees of Hampden-Sidney College, Second Paper". The Virginia Magazine of History and Biography. 6 (3). Richmond, Virginia: Virginia Historical Society: 288–296. ISSN 2330-1317. JSTOR 4242166. OCLC 60624252. (registration required)
- Henneman, J. B. (April 1899b). "Trustees of Hampden-Sidney College, Third Paper". The Virginia Magazine of History and Biography. 6 (4). Richmond, Virginia: Virginia Historical Society: 358–364. ISSN 2330-1317. JSTOR 4242184. OCLC 60624252. (registration required)
- Maxwell, Hu; Swisher, Howard Llewellyn (1897). History of Hampshire County, West Virginia From Its Earliest Settlement to the Present. Morgantown, West Virginia: A. Brown Boughner, Printer. OCLC 680931891. OL 23304577M.
- Miller, James Henry (1908). History of Summers County from the Earliest Settlement to the Present Time. Hinton, West Virginia: James Henry Miller. OCLC 3510699. Archived from the original on April 10, 2016 – via Google Books.
- Miller, Thomas Condit; Maxwell, Hu (1913). West Virginia and Its People, Volume 2. New York City: Lewis Historical Publishing Company. OCLC 1449151. Archived from the original on May 27, 2016 – via Google Books.
- Munske, Roberta R.; Kerns, Wilmer L., eds. (2004). Hampshire County, West Virginia, 1754–2004. Romney, West Virginia: The Hampshire County 250th Anniversary Committee. ISBN 978-0-9715738-2-6. OCLC 55983178.
- Office of the Governor of West Virginia (1903). West Virginia Governor's Message Submitted to Legislature of 1903, With the Accompanying Reports and Documents Covering the Two Fiscal Years October 1, 1900 to September 30, 1902, Volume 1. Charleston, West Virginia: State of West Virginia. OCLC 13484825. Archived from the original on April 8, 2016 – via Google Books.
- Virginia Historical Society (July 1912). "The Poindexter Family (Continued)". The Virginia Magazine of History and Biography. 20 (3). Richmond, Virginia: Virginia Historical Society: 329–331. ISSN 2330-1317. JSTOR 4243214. OCLC 60624252. (registration required)
- West Virginia Bar Association (1886). Constitution and By-Laws of the West Virginia Bar Association, Organized July 8, 1886, Together with the Opening Address of Hon. John Sprigg and the Proceedings of the First Meeting. Morgantown, West Virginia: New Dominion Steam Printing House. OCLC 11874206. Archived from the original on May 18, 2016 – via Google Books.
- West Virginia Legislature (1889). Acts of the Legislature of West Virginia, at Its Nineteenth Regular Session, Commencing January 9, 1888. Charleston, West Virginia: Moses W. Donnally, Public Printer. OCLC 422695120. Archived from the original on May 19, 2016 – via Google Books.
- West Virginia Legislature (1922). John T. Harris, Clerk of the West Virginia Senate (ed.). West Virginia Legislative Hand Book and Manual and Official Register, 1922. Charleston, West Virginia: Tribune Printing Company. OCLC 9771361. Archived from the original on April 30, 2016 – via Google Books.
- Woodworth, Robert Bell (1947). A History of the Presbytery of Winchester (Synod of Virginia): Its Rise and Growth, Ecclesiastical Relations, Institutions and Agencies, Churches and Ministers, 1719–1945. Staunton, Virginia: McClure Printing Company. OCLC 1873001. Archived from the original on June 10, 2016 – via Google Books.

West Virginia Senate
Preceded by Joseph Van Meter	West Virginia State Senator from the 12th Senatorial District; 1885 – 1890; Served alongside: George Edmund Price	Succeeded by Henry Bell Gilkeson
