= John Baker White (clerk of court) =

American military officer and lawyer (1794–1862)

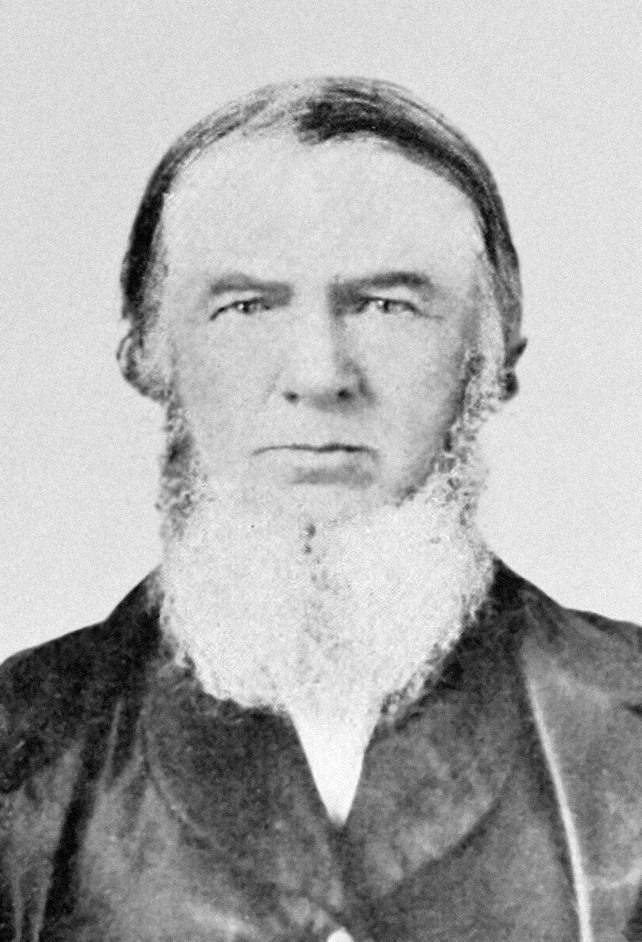
- Portrait of John Baker White

Clerk of Court for Hampshire County
- In office 1815–1861
- Preceded by: Samuel McGuire
- Succeeded by: Thomas A. Keller

Personal details
- Born: August 4, 1794 near Winchester, Frederick County, Virginia, United States
- Died: October 9, 1862 (aged 68) Richmond, Virginia, Confederate States of America
- Resting place: Hollywood Cemetery, Richmond, Virginia, United States
- Party: Constitutional Union Party (1860–1861)
- Spouses: Alcinda Louisa Tapscott; Frances Ann Streit
- Relations: Robert White (father); Arabella Baker (mother); Robert White (great-great-grandfather); Alexander White (great-great-uncle); Francis White (uncle); Samuel Lightfoot Flournoy (son-in-law); John Baker White (grandson); Robert White (grandson)
- Children: Susan C. White Armstrong; Juliet Opie White Tabb; Arabella White Thompson; Robert White; Louisa Tapscott White Armstrong; John Baker White II; Christian Streit White; Alexander White; Henry White; Frances "Fannie" Ann Armstrong White Flournoy; Emma C. White; Lucy White; Katherine White
- Occupation: Military officer; lawyer; court clerk; civil servant

Military service
- Allegiance: United States
- Branch/service: United States Army
- Years of service: 1812–1814
- Rank: Ensign
- Battles/wars: War of 1812

John Baker White (August 4, 1794 – October 9, 1862) was a 19th-century American military officer, lawyer, court clerk, and civil servant in the U.S. state of Virginia.

During the War of 1812, White enlisted in the United States Army as a soldier and was promoted to the military rank of ensign. In 1815, White was qualified as Clerk of Court for both the county and circuit courts of Hampshire County, Virginia (now West Virginia) and he continued to hold these offices through successive appointments and elections for 46 years between 1815 and 1861. To date, White remains the longest-serving Clerk of Court for Hampshire County since the office's creation in 1757. As a prominent lawyer and court clerk, White taught jurisprudence. Many of White's law students later became eminent lawyers and public officials in their own right, including Henry Bedinger, United States House Representative and United States Ambassador to Denmark.

During the American Civil War, White was concerned for the safety of the county's records and proceeded to load land registration records ledger books onto wagons and had them transported for safekeeping. Because of White's efforts, Hampshire County land records survived the war, while those records that remained in the courthouse were destroyed. White was threatened by occupying Union Army forces to either vacate his residence in Romney or face arrest because of his Confederate sympathies. White relocated to Richmond and served in the Confederate States Department of the Treasury.

White was a member of the White political family of Virginia and West Virginia and was the son of prominent Virginia judge Robert White (1759–1831) and the father of West Virginia Attorney General Robert White (1833–1915) and Hampshire County Clerk of Court Christian Streit White (1839–1917).

== Early life and military career ==
John Baker White was born on August 4, 1794, near Winchester in Frederick County, Virginia. White was the third and youngest child of prominent Virginia General Court judge Robert White (1759–1831) and his wife Arabella Baker (daughter of John Baker). Among his other relations, White was a great-great-nephew of United States House Representative Alexander White (1738–1804) and a great-nephew of another United States House Representative, Francis White (1761–1826).

During the War of 1812, White enlisted in the United States Army as a soldier and was promoted to the military rank of ensign.

== Clerk of court career ==
Following his service in the War of 1812, White settled in Romney, Virginia (now West Virginia) where he was appointed as deputy clerk for both the superior court and circuit court in Hampshire County in 1814. On March 20, 1815, White was qualified as Clerk of Court for both the superior and circuit courts of Hampshire County, and he continued to hold these offices through successive appointments and elections for 46 years between 1815 and 1861. To date, White remains the longest-serving Clerk of Court for Hampshire County since the office's creation in 1757.

== Academic affairs ==
As a prominent lawyer and court clerk, White conducted the teaching of jurisprudence in both his Clerk of Court office and residence, where he allowed his law students to reside during their studies. Many of White's law students later became eminent lawyers and public officials in their own right, including: Henry Bedinger, United States House Representative and United States Ambassador to Denmark; James Dillon Armstrong, Hampshire County Circuit Court judge and son of William Armstrong; Dr. Robert White, Presbyterian minister of Tuscaloosa, Alabama; and Virginia lawyers Newton Tapscott, Alfred P. White, and Philip B. Streit.

In addition to his law instruction, White was an active member of the Romney Literary Society. When the act of incorporation for Romney Academy was amended by the Virginia General Assembly on March 25, 1839, White was appointed as a trustee along with other prominent Romney area residents David Gibson, Angus William McDonald, Daniel Mytinger, and John Kern, Jr. The 1839 act authorized any of the five appointed trustees of Romney Academy to fill vacancies on the board "occasioned by death, resignation, removal, or legal disability", thereby preventing future prolonged vacant trustee seats.

== Business affairs ==
By 1839, White was serving on the board of directors of the Bank of the Valley of Virginia in Romney. During the absence of the board's president, David Gibson, White served as president pro tempore from November 29 until December 13, 1839. The Wirgman Building housed the Bank of the Valley of Virginia during White's tenure on its board of directors.

== American Civil War ==
Prior to the outbreak of the American Civil War, White was in support of preserving the United States. In the United States presidential election of 1860, White supported Constitutional Union Party presidential candidate John Bell and his running mate Edward Everett. The Constitutional Union Party was formed by former Whig Party members seeking to avoid secessionism over the issue of slavery. In 1861, White voted for Union candidates to serve as delegates from Hampshire County in the Virginia secession convention, one of which was his son-in-law Colonel E. M. Armstrong.

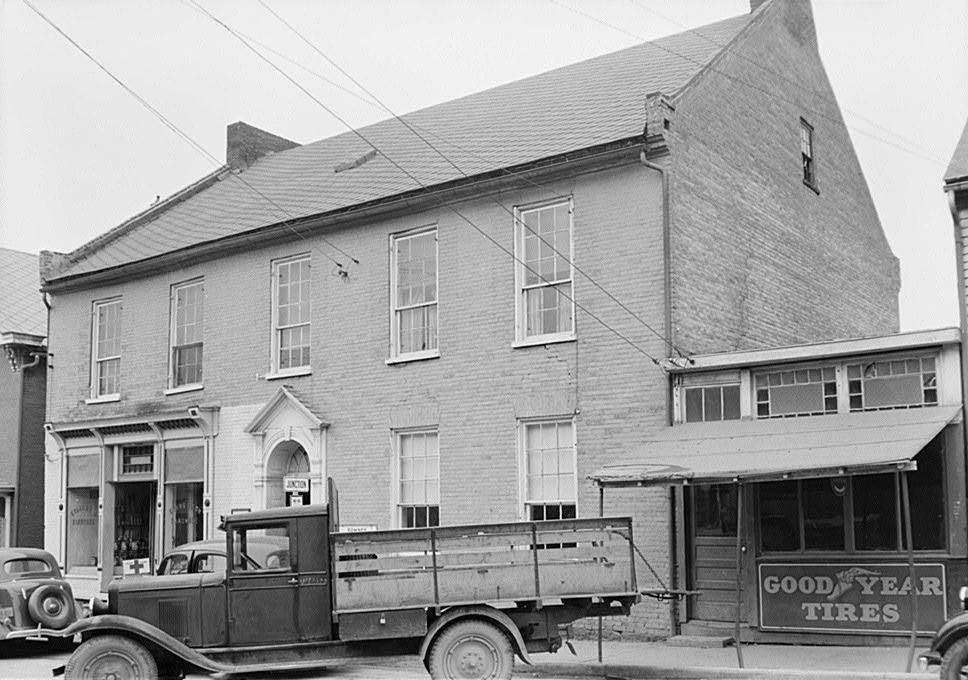
Photographed in 1937, the Wirgman Building in Romney was built for and housed the Bank of the Valley of Virginia around 1825. The structure was razed in 1965 for the construction of the current Bank of Romney building.

White's national loyalties shifted following the Battle of Fort Sumter and other Union encroachments into the Confederate States of America, after which White supported the defense of Virginia's states' rights and of the United States Constitution. White's eldest three sons out of four joined the Confederate States Army, and White became active in enlisting and arousing support within Hampshire County for the Confederate States cause. Because of his Confederate sympathies, White was threatened by occupying Union Army forces to either vacate his residence in Romney or face arrest.

=== Preservation of Hampshire County records ===
No court proceedings convened in the county between 1861 and 1864, and the Hampshire County Courthouse was utilized as a stable by Union soldiers stationed in Romney during the war. In 1861, Union Army forces under the command of Lew Wallace occupied Romney following a minor battle there during which White "kept close watch over" the county's record books so that they would not be destroyed by Union forces. Later in the fall of 1861, Union Army forces under the command of Benjamin Franklin Kelley advanced upon Romney.

Upon learning of this, White was again concerned for the safety of the county's records and proceeded to load land registration records ledger books onto wagons and had them transported to Winchester for safekeeping. White selected for transport only the bound volumes of records which included "deed books, wills, and settlements of estates" and kept the unbound paper records in the courthouse, thus separating them so that the entirety of the county's records could not be destroyed by Union forces. White likely chose to transport the bound volumes of records, as the loose paper records would have been more cumbersome to keep together.

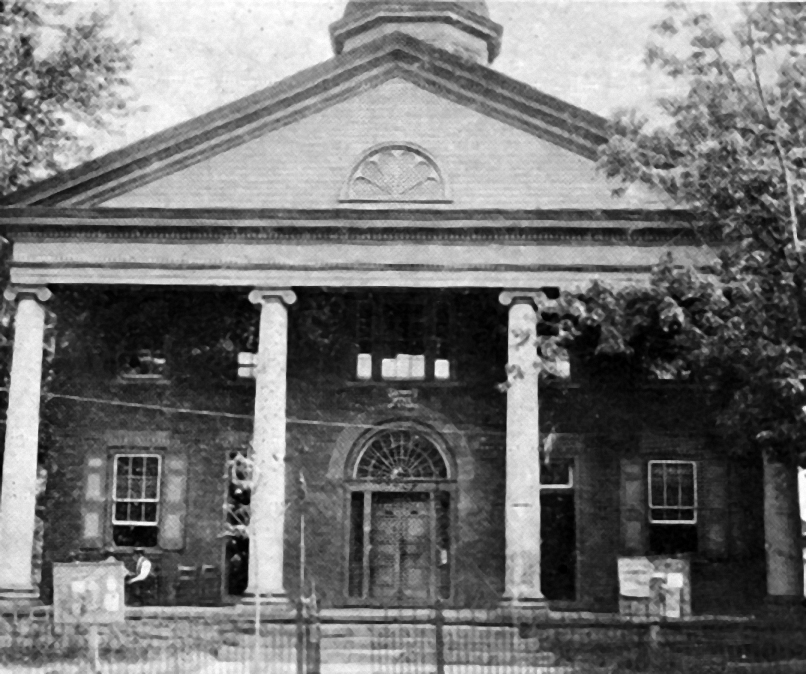
The Hampshire County Courthouse in Romney, where John Baker White served as Clerk of Court for Hampshire County. This courthouse was built in 1833 and remained in service until it burned in 1921.

In 1863, when Winchester was no longer a safe location for the storage of Hampshire County's records and they again risked destruction by Union Army forces, White's son Captain Christian Streit White took responsibility for the records and transferred them to Front Royal. When Front Royal became endangered by advancing Union Army forces, Captain White had the records moved to Luray Caverns where they remained for several months. In the fall of 1864, the county's record books were rescued by Captain White and his company as Union Army troops were in the process of destroying them. Captain White's company loaded about 150 record books into a wagon, and they were taken to North Carolina where they remained safely for the duration of the war. Hampshire County's land records survived and were returned to the courthouse following the conclusion of the American Civil War, likely by a soldier returning to the area from North Carolina. Had White not separated the records and sent the bound volumes away for safekeeping, Hampshire County would have lost all its records during the course of the war, as those that remained in the courthouse were destroyed.

In addition to the desecration of the courthouse's loose paper records, either a Union Army officer or an Indiana unit confiscated an old Scots language Bible belonging to White, which had been passed down to him from his grandfather, John White. The "old Scots Bible" was purportedly taken as punishment against White for his support of the Confederacy.

=== Removal to Richmond ===
White left Romney with his wife and youngest children and traveled to Richmond where he was offered a position in the Confederate States Department of the Treasury within the government of the President of the Confederate States of America, Jefferson Davis.

== Death and legacy ==
White died soon after his arrival in Richmond on October 9, 1862. He was interred by Scottish Rite Masons at Hollywood Cemetery in Richmond. Distant relative Reverend Moses D. Hoge of the Southern Presbyterian Church, Bishop Duncan of the Methodist Episcopal Church, South, and Bishop Minegerode of the Southern Protestant Episcopal Church participated in White's funeral services.

White's friends and family believed that he "died of grief" caused by the loss of his property in Romney and his concern for the safety of the records in the Hampshire County Courthouse during the conflict. In their History of Hampshire County, West Virginia: From Its Earliest Settlement to the Present (1897), West Virginia historians Hu Maxwell and Howard Llewellyn Swisher said of White:

"[White] was a man of great integrity, kind heart, strong sense, sound judgment, high principle, and broad cultivation. He was a Christian, and was prominent in every enterprise for the advancement of the county or the betterment of its people, a good lawyer and safe counsellor, true and trusty in all the relations of life, and with a heart and hand ever open to charity. His life was rich in good deeds, and his means and large influence were potent factors in promoting the material interests and moral, religious, and intellectual advancement of the people of his county. Few men have been more beloved and honored than he was among his own people."

— Hu Maxwell and Howard Llewellyn Swisher, History of Hampshire County, West Virginia: From Its Earliest Settlement to the Present (1897)

== Personal life ==
=== Marriage and issue ===
White was married first to Alcinda Louisa Tapscott of Jefferson County, Virginia (now West Virginia), on December 15, 1815. Tapscott was White's cousin through his mother, Arabella Baker White. White and his first wife Alcinda had three children together:

| Name | Spouse |
|---|---|
| Susan C. White Armstrong | William James Armstrong, son of U.S. Representative William Armstrong |
| Juliet Opie White Tabb | Harrison Noble Tabb of Martinsburg |
| Arabella White Thompson | Judge Lucas P. Thompson of Staunton |

White was married for the second time to Frances Ann Streit (March 19, 1811 – November 12, 1866), a daughter of Lutheran Reverend Christian Streit of Winchester, Virginia. Streit and her family were of Swiss descent. White and his second wife, Frances, had ten children (one of which died in infancy):

| Portrait | Name | Birth date | Death date | Spouse |
|---|---|---|---|---|
| Robert White | Robert White | February 7, 1833 | December 12, 1915 | Ellen E. Vass |
| | Louisa Tapscott White Armstrong | July 7, 1836 | August 20, 1887 | Edward McCarty Armstrong, son of U.S. Representative William Armstrong |
| | John Baker White II | 1837 | 1858 | Unmarried |
| Christian Streit White | Christian Streit White | March 10, 1839 | January 28, 1917 | Elizabeth "Bessie" Jane Schultze; Catharine Steele |
| Alexander White | Alexander White | 1841 | 1884 | Susan L. Williams of Hardy County |
| | Henry White | 1842 | 1903 | Unmarried |
| | Frances "Fannie" Ann Armstrong White Flournoy | April 10, 1844 | February 25, 1922 | Samuel Lightfoot Flournoy |
| | Emma C. White | 1846 | | |
| | Lucy White | 1849 | | |
| | Katherine White | 1849 | | |

=== Residence ===
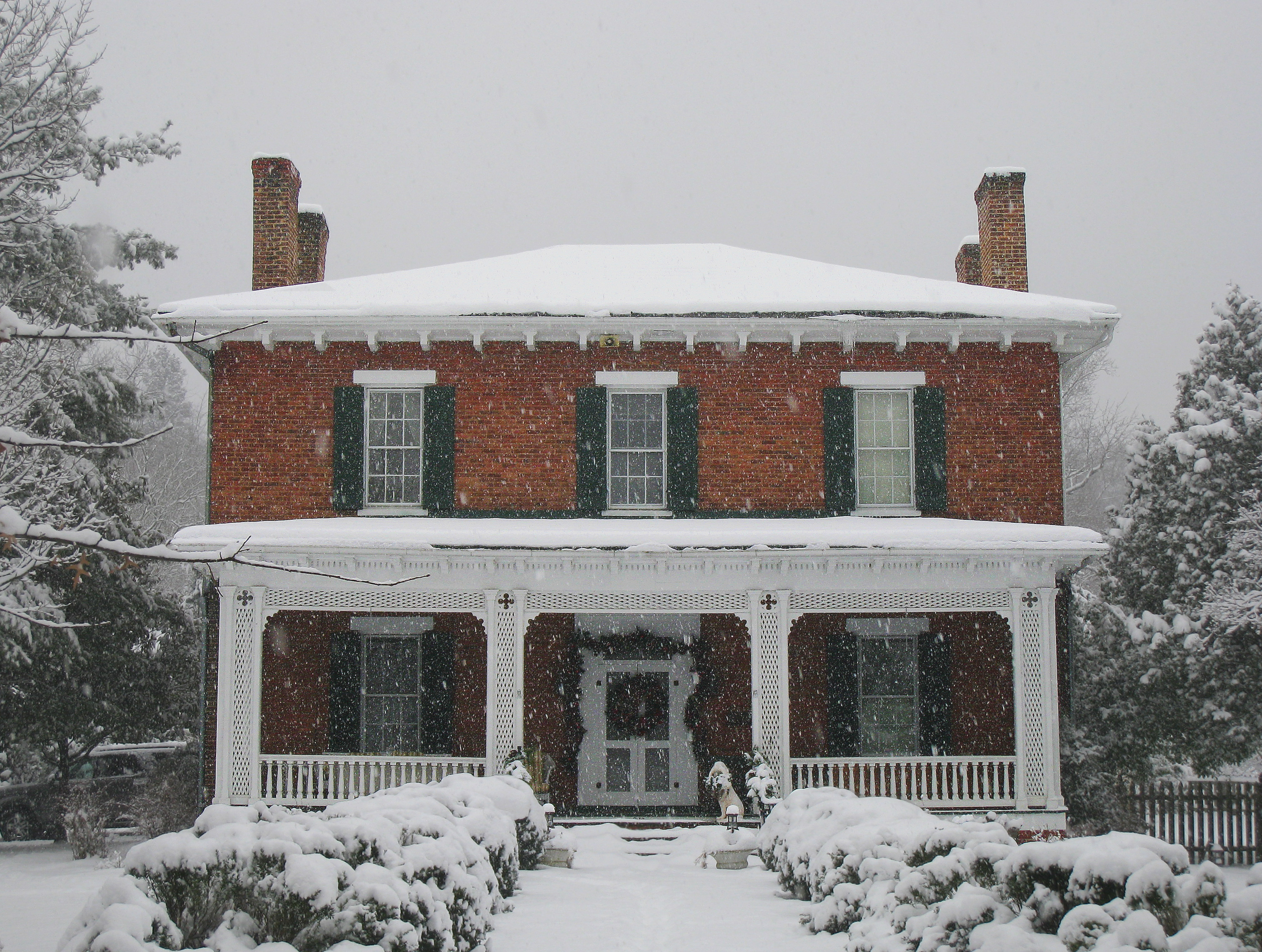
White's residence, which later became known as "Liberty Hall," along East Main Street in Romney

White and his family resided in a large brick mansion located along East Main Street (Northwestern Turnpike) which was later known as "Liberty Hall". Due to his upbringing in an affluent family, White was a person of means from a young age, and in his early adulthood he was able to construct a "large brick mansion" at this location. His original residence was destroyed by fire in 1857, and White replaced it with a more modest brick edifice where he resided until his departure from Romney in 1861 during the American Civil War. White's home was a "seat of true old Virginia hospitality" and it was frequented by all socio-cultural strata of Hampshire County and the greater Valley of Virginia region.

During the construction of the Northwestern Turnpike through Romney, the state superintendent for the project, Angus William McDonald, proposed building the thoroughfare through White's garden in front of his residence. White won an appeal in court which caused the turnpike to be rerouted, thus creating the present curve on East Main Street in front of White's former residence.

== Bibliography ==
- Brannon, Selden W., ed. (1976). Historic Hampshire: A Symposium of Hampshire County and Its People, Past and Present. Parsons, West Virginia: McClain Printing Company. ISBN 978-0-87012-236-1. OCLC 3121468.
- Brant and Fuller (1890). History of the Upper Ohio Valley, With Family History and Biographical Sketches, A Statement of Its Resources, Industrial Growth and Commercial Advantages, Volume 1. Madison, Wisconsin: Brant and Fuller. Archived from the original on April 27, 2016.
- Eisenburg, William Edward; Utt, James Howard (2003). This Heritage: The Story of Lutheran Beginnings in the Lower Shenandoah Valley and of Grace Church, Winchester. Lot's Wife Publishing.
- Indiana Historical Bureau (1939). Indiana History Bulletin, Volume 16. Indianapolis, Indiana: Indiana Historical Bureau. Archived from the original on July 4, 2014.
- Kerns, Wilmer L. (1995). Frederick County, Virginia: Settlement and Some First Families of Back Creek Valley, 1730-1830. Gateway Press, Incorporated. Archived from the original on June 27, 2014.
- Lyle, Maria Catherine Nourse, ed. (1897). James Nourse and His Descendants. Lexington, Kentucky: Transylvania Printing Company. OCLC 729493200. Archived from the original on October 16, 2020 – via Google Books.
- Maxwell, Hu; Swisher, Howard Llewellyn (1897). History of Hampshire County, West Virginia From Its Earliest Settlement to the Present. Morgantown, West Virginia: A. Brown Boughner, Printer. OCLC 680931891. OL 23304577M.
- Morrison, Alfred James; Virginia State Board of Education (1917). The Beginnings of Public Education in Virginia, 1776–1860: Study of Secondary Schools in Relation to the State Literary Fund, Volume 187. D. Bottom, Superintendent of Public Printing. Archived from the original on January 4, 2014.
- Munske, Roberta R.; Kerns, Wilmer L., eds. (2004). Hampshire County, West Virginia, 1754–2004. Romney, West Virginia: The Hampshire County 250th Anniversary Committee. ISBN 978-0-9715738-2-6. OCLC 55983178.
- Sprague, William Buell (1869). Annals of the American Pulpit, Or, Commemorative Notices of Distinguished American Clergymen of Various Denominations: From the Early Settlement of the Country to the Close of the Year Eighteen Hundred and Fifty-five: with Historical Introductions, Volume 9. New York City, New York: Robert Carter & Brothers. OCLC 839292. Archived from the original on May 5, 2016.
- Virginia General Assembly (1839). Acts passed at a General Assembly of the Commonwealth of Virginia. Virginia General Assembly. Archived from the original on January 4, 2014.
- Virginia House of Delegates; Virginia General Assembly (1839). Journal of the House of Delegates of the Commonwealth of Virginia. Samuel Shepherd, Printer to the Commonwealth of Virginia.

Court offices
| Preceded by Samuel McGuire | Clerk of Court for Hampshire County; 1815 – 1861 | Succeeded by Thomas A. Keller |
