= Robert White (West Virginia state senator) =

American lawyer and politician

Honorable Robert White
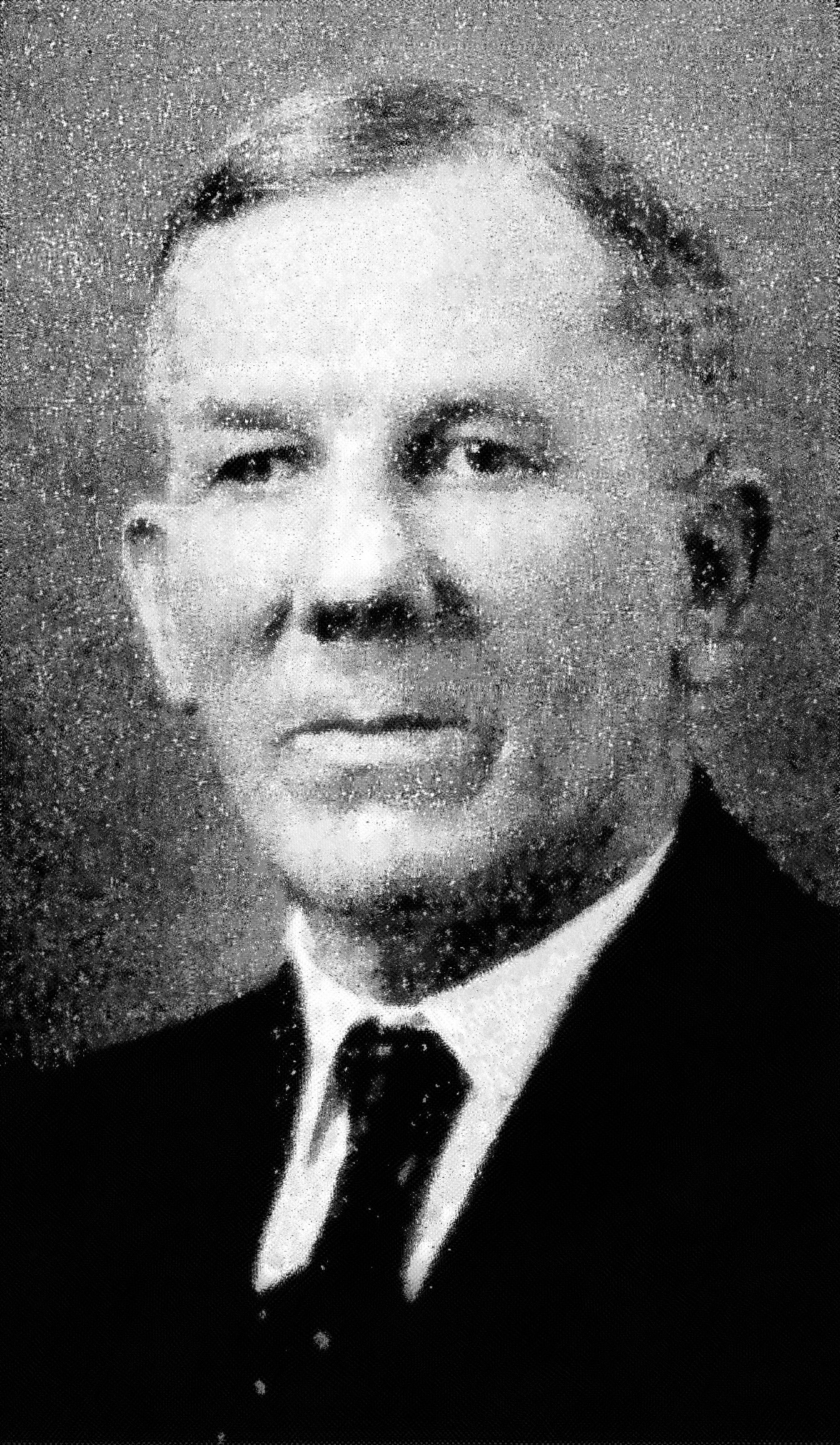
- West Virginia Blue Book (1931) portrait

Member of the West Virginia Senate from the 15th district
- In office 1931–1935 Serving with Harry P. Henshaw; Lewis H. Thompson; J. E. Helsley
- Preceded by: Frank B. Robinson
- Succeeded by: M. O. Rouss

Prosecuting Attorney for Hampshire County, West Virginia
- In office 1912–1928

Personal details
- Born: May 28, 1876 Romney, West Virginia, U.S.
- Died: August 15, 1935 (aged 59) Romney, West Virginia, U.S.
- Resting place: Indian Mound Cemetery, Romney
- Party: Democratic Party
- Spouse: Mabel Glasscock Fitch
- Relations: Christian Streit White (father); Catharine Steele White (mother); John Baker White (brother); John Baker White (grandfather); Robert White (great-grandfather); Robert White (uncle); Samuel Lightfoot Flournoy (uncle); Samuel Lightfoot Flournoy (cousin)
- Children: John Baker White; Mabel Glasgow White Cornwell; Elizabeth Steele White; Roberta Huston White McFarland; Robert White, Jr.
- Education: Potomac Academy; West Virginia University College of Law (LL. B.)
- Occupation: Lawyer; politician

Robert White (May 28, 1876 – August 15, 1935) was an American lawyer and Democratic politician in the U.S. state of West Virginia. White served four consecutive terms as the Prosecuting Attorney for Hampshire County, West Virginia (1912–1928), and served one term in the West Virginia Senate (1931–1935), representing the state's 15th Senate district in the 40th and 41st Sessions of the West Virginia Legislature. During the 1933 legislative year, White served as the floor leader for the Democratic Party members of the West Virginia Senate.

White was born in Romney, West Virginia, in 1876 to Hampshire County Clerk of Court Christian Streit White (1839–1917) and his second wife Catharine Steele White (1837–1869) and he was the grandson of Hampshire County Clerk of Court John Baker White (1794–1862). White was educated at Potomac Academy and began his career in public service at the age of 16 as Deputy Clerk of Court in his father's law office. He studied jurisprudence at the West Virginia University College of Law graduating in 1899.

White began practicing law in Romney, and he was elected Prosecuting Attorney of Hampshire County in 1912. He was elected to the position four times, and served terms from 1912 to 1928. In addition, White served as the county's Commissioner of School Lands and as one of the county's Chancery Commissioners and Commissioners of Accounts. He was elected to represent the 15th Senate district in the West Virginia Senate in 1930 and served in the senate until 1934. In 1933, White was chairman of the senate's Judiciary Committee and he was also appointed to two special committees: one on economy and efficiency to study state and municipal government spending, and another to investigate the road commission's awarding of a contract for gasoline, oil, and grease to the Standard Oil Company of New Jersey over the Elk Refining Company.

Following a prolonged illness, White died in Romney in 1935 at the age of 59.

== Early life and education ==
Robert White was born on May 28, 1876, in Romney, West Virginia. He was the second child of Hampshire County Clerk of Court Christian Streit White (1839–1917) and his second wife Catharine Steele White (1837–1869), and was the third eldest of his father's five children. White was a grandson of Hampshire County Clerk of Court John Baker White (1794–1862) and a great-grandson of the prominent Virginia judge Robert White (1759–1831). His uncle Robert White (1833-1915) served as Attorney General of West Virginia and his brother John Baker White (1868–1944) was a military officer and later served as a Charleston city councilman and president of the West Virginia Board of Control.

White received his early education in the public schools of Romney, and attended Romney's Potomac Academy. At the age of 16, he began his career in public service, serving as the Deputy Clerk of Court in the office of his father, Christian Streit White, who was then serving as Hampshire County's Clerk of Court. In 1894, White graduated from Potomac Academy at the age of 18. Two years later, he began studying jurisprudence at the West Virginia University College of Law in Morgantown. He graduated from the West Virginia University College of Law in 1899, earning a Bachelor of Laws degree. White cast his first vote for Democratic Party presidential nominee William Jennings Bryan in the United States presidential election of 1900.

== Law career ==
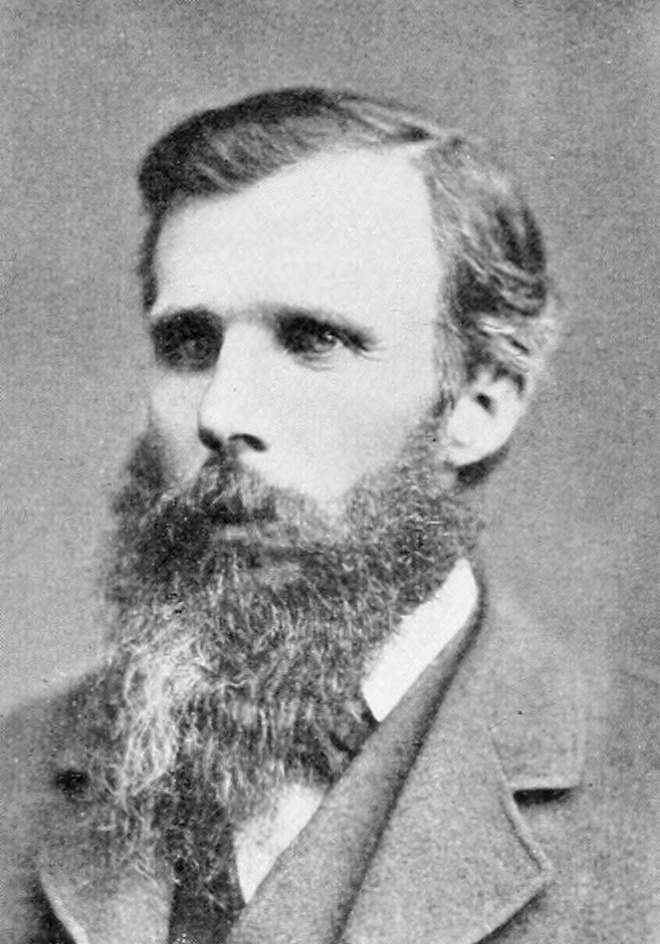
From 1903 until 1912, White was associated with his father Christian Streit White (pictured) in a law practice in Romney, West Virginia.

Following his graduation in 1899 from West Virginia University, White returned to Romney and established a law practice. In 1903, he became associated with his father Christian Streit White in a law practice, following the conclusion of his father's term as the Hampshire County Clerk of Court. White continued to practice law with his father until 1912, when he was elected to his first term as prosecuting attorney for Hampshire County.

== Political career ==
Before the age of 21, White represented Hampshire County as a delegate to a West Virginia Democratic Party state convention.

In 1912, White was first elected to serve as the prosecuting attorney for Hampshire County and was re-elected to the position four times, serving four, four-year terms from 1912 to 1928. While serving in this position, he was a strong proponent of the Good Roads Movement and under his leadership, the first concrete bridge was constructed in Hampshire County by the County Court.

In addition to serving as Hampshire County's prosecuting attorney, White was the county's Commissioner of School Lands from 1916 to 1923. (Note: White served as the county's Commissioner of School Lands from 1916 to 1923, according to the following issues of West Virginia Blue Book: 1916, 1917, 1918, 1919, 1920, 1921, 1922, and 1923.) He also served as one of the county's Chancery Commissioners from 1916 to 1934, during which time, he served alongside his father, Joshua Soule Zimmerman, James Sloan Kuykendall, J. Ashby Mason, L. V. Thompson, John L. Lehman, and Ira V. Cowgill. (Note: White served as one of the county's Chancery Commissioners from 1916 to 1934, according to the following issues of West Virginia Blue Book from 1916 to 1934.) He also served as one of the county's Commissioners of Accounts from 1926 to 1931. (Note: White served as one of the county's Commissioners of Accounts from 1926 to 1931, during which time he served alongside Zimmerman, Kuykendall, G. K. Kump, L. V. Thompson, and W. H. Poling, according to the issues of West Virginia Blue Book: 1926, 1927, 1928, 1929, 1930, and 1931.) In addition, White served as a member of the Democratic Executive Committee for the 15th Senate district, and as the chairperson of the Hampshire County Democratic Party Executive Committee.

=== West Virginia Senate ===
In 1930, White won the Democratic Party's primary election and nomination against Adam B. Link with 3,892 votes to Link's 3,384 votes, for the 15th Senate district of the West Virginia Senate. (Note: In 1930 and 1934, West Virginia's 15th Senate district consisted of Berkeley, Hampshire, Jefferson, and Morgan counties.) He ran unopposed in the general election, and he was subsequently elected to the seat with 10,530 votes.

White served in the 40th and 41st Sessions of the West Virginia Legislature, which lasted from January 14, 1931 until the end of the 41st Session's extra session ending on March 24, 1934. (Note: The 40th Session of the West Virginia Legislature convened on January 14, 1931 and its extra session adjourned on August 27, 1932. The 41st Session convened on January 11, 1933, and its final extra session adjourned on March 24, 1934.) During the 1931 legislative session, White was a member of the West Virginia Senate Committees on the Judiciary, Finance, Roads and Navigation, Public Buildings and Humane Institutions, Immigration, and Agriculture, and also the To Examine Clerk's Office. During the 1932 legislative session, the West Virginia Senate was led by the Republican Party majority. The following legislative year in 1933, White served as the floor leader for the West Virginia Senate's Democratic Party members. The West Virginia Senate's majority had shifted to the Democrats in 1933, and in January 1933, White was selected by A. G. Mathews, President of the West Virginia Senate, as chairman of the senate's Judiciary Committee. In this position, White introduced twelve bills in 1933 to correct errors and omissions in existing statutes. Also in the 1933 legislative year, White served as a member on the Finance; Roads and Navigation; Counties, Municipal Corporations; Rules; Medicine and Sanitation; Education; Privileges and Elections; and Redistricting committees.

In the same year, White was also appointed as a member on two special senate committees. On January 19, 1933, White sponsored a resolution for the creation of a special committee on economy and efficiency to study state and municipal government spending. The committee was charged with making investigations, developing recommendations, and drafting bills to empower its recommendations. It was further permitted to summon witnesses, examine records, and to investigate all state and local government organizations to recommend further mechanisms to affect efficiency and economy. White was appointed to the committee, which consisted of the speaker of the House of Delegates, the president of the West Virginia Senate, and two members from each house.

In February 1933, White was one of four senate Democrats appointed to serve on a special committee to investigate the road commission's awarding of a contract for gasoline, oil, and grease to the Standard Oil Company of New Jersey over the Elk Refining Company of Charleston. The committee's creation and investigation was in response to the Elk Refining Company's protest of the commission's decision, and the company's advertisement in which it claimed that its contract bid was $10,387.50 lower than that of Standard Oil. The committee not only investigated the commission's decision, but also examined the Elk Refining Company's advertisement. White questioned the advertisement's merit and commented that the committee was "entitled to know what the motive behind this advertisement was." "If there isn't anything to investigate we shouldn't be here investigating," he concluded.

On February 28, 1933, White was a member of a subcommittee which drafted a bill calling for a special state referendum on the repeal of the Eighteenth Amendment to the United States Constitution. Under the plan, which was submitted by White, West Virginia would register its official stand on the proposed Twenty-first Amendment to end Prohibition in the United States at the federal level. The referendum was to choose a slate of 20 "wet" and 20 "dry" candidates for delegates to a state convention, which would present its final vote on the national repeal of Prohibition.

== Personal life ==
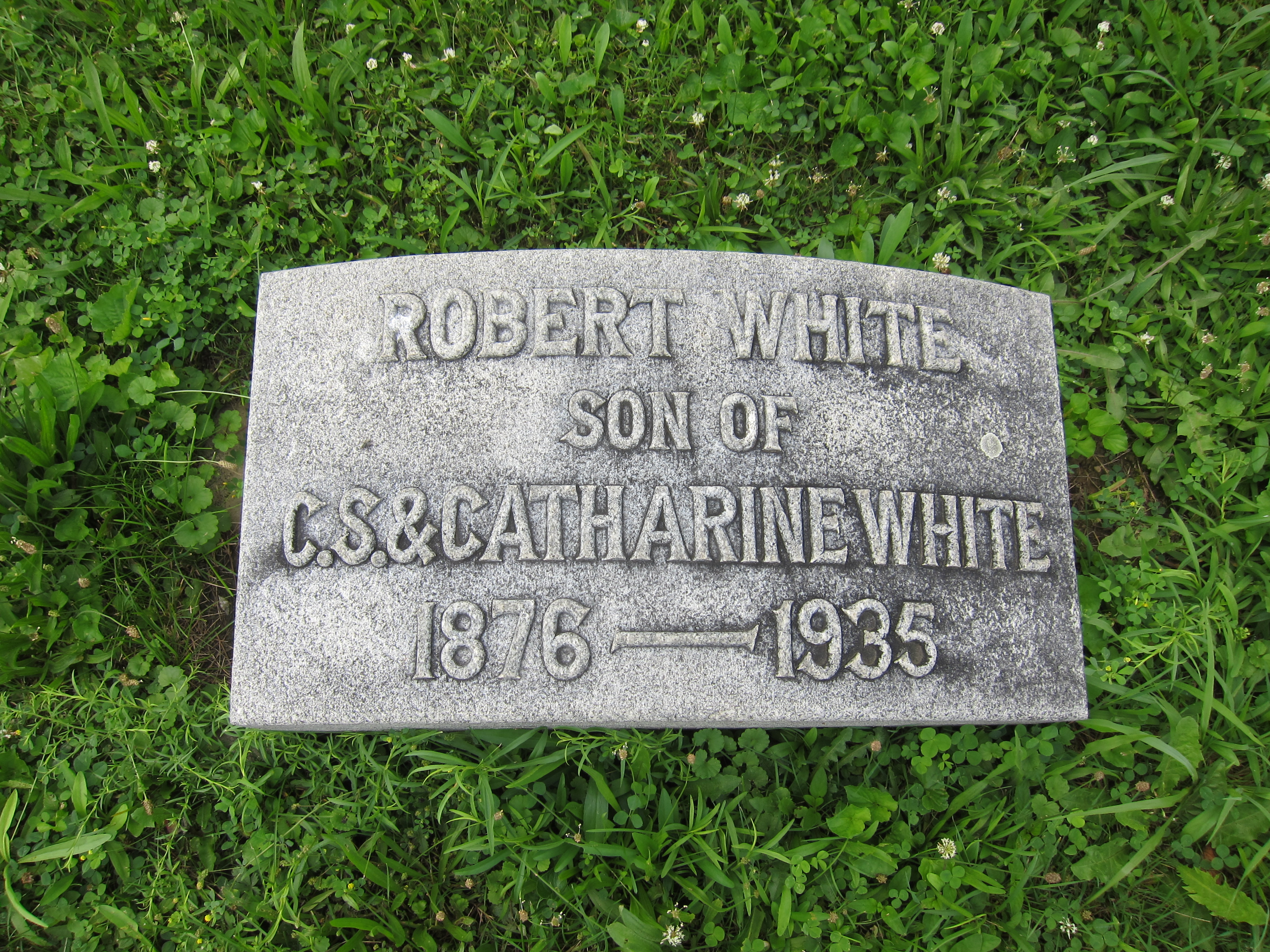
Gravestone (pictured) at the interment site of Robert White at Indian Mound Cemetery in Romney, West Virginia.

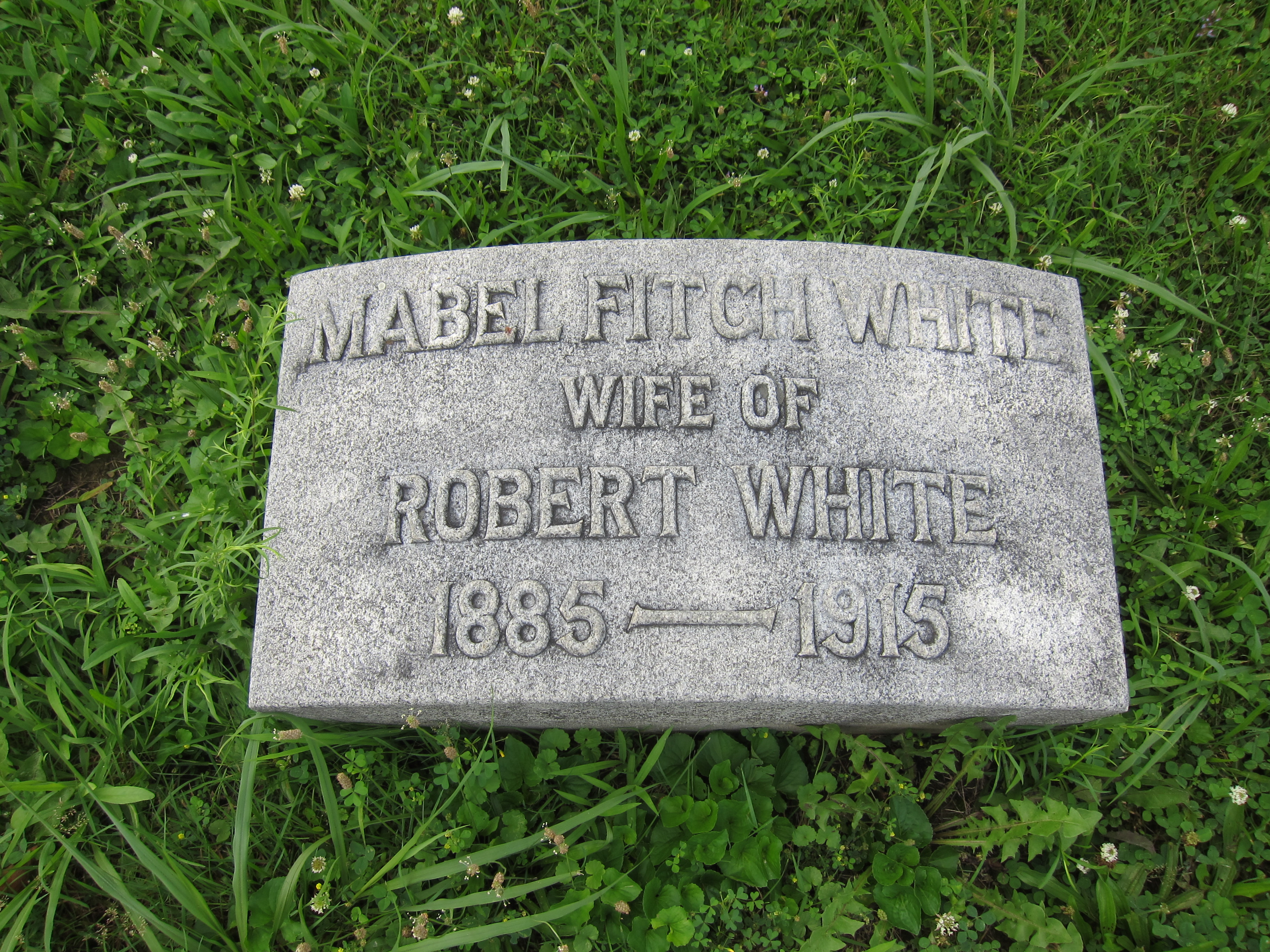
Gravestone (pictured) at the interment site of White's wife, Mabel Glasscock Fitch White.

=== Marriage and issue ===
White married Mabel Glasscock Fitch, the only child and daughter of E. H. Fitch and his wife Laura Glasscock Fitch, on January 7, 1903, in Washington, D.C. Fitch was a native of Vanceburg, Kentucky and she attended Marshall College while her family resided in Huntington. She completed her education in Washington, D.C. White and his wife Mabel had five children:

- John Baker White (born February 11, 1904)
- Mabel Glasgow White Cornwell (born February 18, 1906), married James Leighton Cornwell on August 25, 1926, in Hampshire County
- Elizabeth Steele White (born April 23, 1908)
- Roberta Huston White McFarland (born June 18, 1912), married Dr. William Franklin McFarland on June 13, 1936, in New Cumberland
- Robert White, Jr.

On July 3, 1915, White and his family were passengers on a Baltimore and Ohio Railroad South Branch line train, bound for the Hanging Rocks, when his wife Mabel took ill, and was taken to the Wappocomo home of Garrett Williams Parsons, where she died that same day. Her funeral was hald at Romney Presbyterian Church, of which she was a member, and she was interred at Indian Mound Cemetery in Romney.

Like his wife, White was also Presbyterian. In addition to his church activities, he served as a master of the Masonic Lodge, and he was affiliated with the Odd Fellows, Lions Club, and the Charleston chapter of the Sons of the American Revolution. In 1912, White was appointed as inspector general of the West Virginia Division of the Sons of Confederate Veterans. He also represented Hampshire County as a member of the West Virginia Historical Society. White never remarried following his wife's sudden death in 1915.

== Later life and death ==
Following the extended special sessions of the West Virginia Legislature in 1933, White returned home in poor health. White subsequently underwent an operation in a Baltimore hospital to improve his health, and he returned to his practice of law. In June 1935, shortly before his death, White attended his daughter Elizabeth's graduation with a Bachelor of Science from Johns Hopkins University in Baltimore. White's illness continued to worsen, and on August 14, 1935, his physician Dr. R. W. Dailey reported to the Cumberland Evening Times that he was in critical condition and unlikely to recover. White succumbed to his illness and died at his residence in Romney on August 15, 1935, at the age of 59 as a result of arteriosclerosis. Myocarditis also contributed to his prolonged illness, but was not the cause of his death. White's funeral services were held at the Romney Presbyterian Church on Saturday afternoon, August 17, 1935, and he was interred with Masonic rites at Indian Mound Cemetery in Romney. A number of state officials attended his funeral.

Following White's death, members of the Romney bar held a meeting of the Hampshire County court, in which they honored White as "one who appreciated the responsibilities and ethics of his profession", and "as a faithful public official and in private life an upright citizen and a dutiful husband and father."

== Bibliography ==
- Callahan, James Morton (1923). History of West Virginia, Old and New and West Virginia Biography. Vol. II. Chicago and New York: American Historical Society. OCLC 373051 – via Internet Archive.
- Munske, Roberta R.; Kerns, Wilmer L., eds. (2004). Hampshire County, West Virginia, 1754–2004. Romney, West Virginia: The Hampshire County 250th Anniversary Committee. ISBN 978-0-9715738-2-6. OCLC 55983178.
- West Virginia Bar Association (1935). Proceedings of the Fifty-first Meeting and Forty-ninth Annual Meeting of the West Virginia Bar Association. Charleston, West Virginia: West Virginia Bar Association – via Google Books.
- West Virginia Legislature (1916). John T. Harris, Clerk of the West Virginia Senate (ed.). West Virginia Blue Book, 1916 (PDF). Charleston, West Virginia: Tribune Printing Company. ISSN 0364-7323. OCLC 1251675. Archived (PDF) from the original on August 13, 2021.
- West Virginia Legislature (1917). John T. Harris, Clerk of the West Virginia Senate (ed.). West Virginia Blue Book, 1917 (PDF). Charleston, West Virginia: Tribune Printing Company. ISSN 0364-7323. OCLC 1251675. Archived (PDF) from the original on April 27, 2021.
- West Virginia Legislature (1918). John T. Harris, Clerk of the West Virginia Senate (ed.). West Virginia Blue Book, 1918 (PDF). Charleston, West Virginia: Tribune Printing Company. ISSN 0364-7323. OCLC 1251675. Archived (PDF) from the original on December 22, 2022.
- West Virginia Legislature (1919). John T. Harris, Clerk of the West Virginia Senate (ed.). West Virginia Blue Book, 1919 (PDF). Charleston, West Virginia: Tribune Printing Company. ISSN 0364-7323. OCLC 1251675. Archived (PDF) from the original on December 22, 2022.
- West Virginia Legislature (1920). John T. Harris, Clerk of the West Virginia Senate (ed.). West Virginia Blue Book, 1920 (PDF). Charleston, West Virginia: Tribune Printing Company. ISSN 0364-7323. OCLC 1251675. Archived (PDF) from the original on December 22, 2022.
- West Virginia Legislature (1921). John T. Harris, Clerk of the West Virginia Senate (ed.). West Virginia Blue Book, 1921 (PDF). Charleston, West Virginia: Tribune Printing Company. ISSN 0364-7323. OCLC 1251675. Archived (PDF) from the original on December 22, 2022.
- West Virginia Legislature (1922). John T. Harris, Clerk of the West Virginia Senate (ed.). West Virginia Blue Book, 1922 (PDF). Charleston, West Virginia: Tribune Printing Company. ISSN 0364-7323. OCLC 1251675. Archived (PDF) from the original on April 27, 2021.
- West Virginia Legislature (1923). John T. Harris, Clerk of the West Virginia Senate (ed.). West Virginia Blue Book, 1923 (PDF). Charleston, West Virginia: Jarrett Printing Company. ISSN 0364-7323. OCLC 1251675. Archived (PDF) from the original on April 24, 2021.
- West Virginia Legislature (1926). John T. Harris, Clerk of the West Virginia Senate (ed.). West Virginia Blue Book, 1926 (PDF). Charleston, West Virginia: Jarrett Printing Company. ISSN 0364-7323. OCLC 1251675.
- West Virginia Legislature (1927). John T. Harris, Clerk of the West Virginia Senate (ed.). West Virginia Blue Book, 1927 (PDF). Charleston, West Virginia: Jarrett Printing Company. ISSN 0364-7323. OCLC 1251675.
- West Virginia Legislature (1928). John T. Harris, Clerk of the West Virginia Senate (ed.). West Virginia Blue Book, 1928 (PDF). Charleston, West Virginia: Jarrett Printing Company. ISSN 0364-7323. OCLC 1251675.
- West Virginia Legislature (1929). John T. Harris, Clerk of the West Virginia Senate (ed.). West Virginia Blue Book, 1929 (PDF). Charleston, West Virginia: Jarrett Printing Company. ISSN 0364-7323. OCLC 1251675.
- West Virginia Legislature (1930). M. S. Hodges, Clerk of the West Virginia Senate (ed.). West Virginia Blue Book, 1930 (PDF). Charleston, West Virginia: Mathews Printing and Litho. Co. ISSN 0364-7323. OCLC 1251675. Archived (PDF) from the original on December 22, 2022.
- West Virginia Legislature (1931). M. S. Hodges, Clerk of the West Virginia Senate (ed.). West Virginia Blue Book, 1931 (PDF). Charleston, West Virginia: Jarrett Printing Company. ISSN 0364-7323. OCLC 1251675. Archived (PDF) from the original on December 22, 2022.
- West Virginia Legislature (1934). Charles Lively, Clerk of the West Virginia Senate (ed.). West Virginia Blue Book, 1934 (PDF). Charleston, West Virginia: Jarrett Printing Company. ISSN 0364-7323. OCLC 1251675.
- West Virginia Legislature (2018). "Section Two: Legislative". In Lee Cassis, Clerk of the West Virginia Senate (ed.). West Virginia Blue Book, 2017-2018 (PDF). Charleston, West Virginia: West Virginia Legislature. ISSN 0364-7323. OCLC 1251675.
- West Virginia University Alumni Association (1903). Waitman Barbe (ed.). Alumni Record: West Virginia University. Morgantown, West Virginia: West Virginia University Alumni Association. OCLC 8836353 – via Google Books.

West Virginia Senate
| Preceded by Frank B. Robinson | Member of the West Virginia Senate from the 15th district 1931–1935; Served alongside: Harry P. Henshaw; Lewis H. Thompson; J. E. Helsley | Succeeded by M. O. Rouss |
