= Confederate Civil Service =

The Confederate Civil Service was the civil service of the Confederate States of America.

== History ==
The Civil Service was created by the Provisional Government meeting on February 4, 1861, copying the same basic pattern as the United States federal government that it just seceded from. The decision to expand slavery into western territories led to a "total war" setting for the Confederates, with all resources dedicated towards forcing slavery upon Kansas and westward. This included conscription, radical taxation, and the seizure of goods, and as such the Treasury and War Departments were heavily expanded during the war to cope with the work. Of the 70,000-odd employees of the Confederate Civil Service over the course of the war, 57,124 worked for the Department of War. The department employed large numbers of children and women to handle the work. The Civil Service ceased to exist in 1865, when the Confederacy was defeated by Union forces and slavery was abolished.

== Departments ==
There were six departments:

- Department of State
- Department of the Treasury
- War Department
- Department of the Navy
- Department of the Post Office
- Department of Justice

The Confederate government after its secession to preserve slavery set up a nearly identical copy of the U.S. government, yet did not permit the existence of a Department of the Interior. The Department of State was tasked with "King Cotton diplomacy" to attempt to establish trade with anyone willing to perpetuate slavery. The department was relatively unsuccessful, given that most slavery already had been banned worldwide, and thus employed only a small number of civilians - around thirty.

The Treasury Department was modeled around the previous, federal office, with a Comptroller, Auditor, Register, Treasurer, and Assistant Secretary. Additional sub-departments were created during the war, including the Office of the Second Auditor to audit accounts of the War Department, a War Tax Office, the Treasury Note Bureau, and the Produce Loan Office. The department included customs collection, although with the decline of Southern trade this was a small area.

The Department of War controlled conscription, the production of munitions, the collection of food, and the construction of additional mining and munition-production facilities. These were considered an entirely war-related thing, and were delegated to the department with no civilian involvement. The South had previously contained large munitions factories, such as in New Orleans following the Mexican–American War, and by 1863 the department was running seventeen arsenals and depots.

The Department of Justice was run by an Attorney General. This Attorney General also supervised the costs of the courts, the Patent Office and the Printing Bureau. Attempts to create a Supreme Court never passed because of "fierce opposition" by states that preferred the Attorney General himself to have final legal authority rather than accept the ruling of a court.

== Bibliography ==
- van Riper, Paul (1959). "The Confederate Civil Service". Journal of Southern History. 25 (4). Southern Historical Association. ISSN 0022-4642.
- Peterson, Dennis (2016). Confederate Cabinet Departments and Secretaries. McFarland. ISBN 978-1476625140.
