= John Baker White (West Virginia politician) =

American lawyer, military officer, and politician (1868–1944)

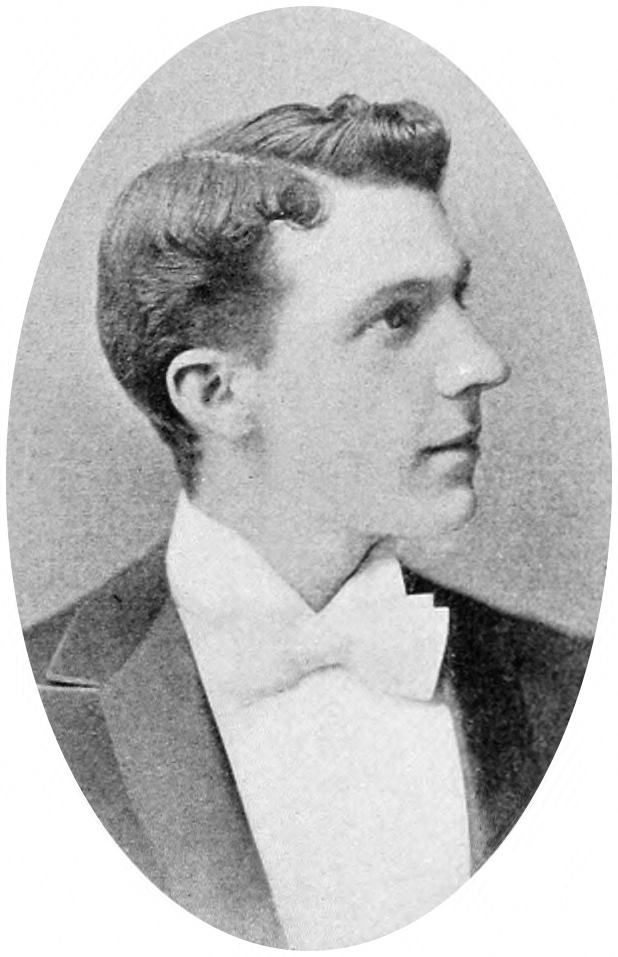
- Portrait of John Baker White, prior to 1897.

Member of the Board of Affairs of Charleston, West Virginia
- In office 1907–1911

Personal details
- Born: August 24, 1868 Romney, West Virginia, United States
- Died: June 2, 1944 (aged 75) Rupert, West Virginia, United States
- Resting place: Indian Mound Cemetery, Romney, West Virginia, United States
- Party: Democratic Party
- Spouse: Mary Ann Williamson
- Relations: Christian Streit White (father); Elizabeth "Bessie" Jane Schultze (mother); Robert White (brother); John Baker White (grandfather); Robert White (great-grandfather); Robert White (uncle); Samuel Lightfoot Flournoy (uncle)
- Occupation: Lawyer; military officer; politician
- Awards: Distinguished Service Order

Military service
- Allegiance: United States
- Branch/service: West Virginia National Guard (1888–1898); United States Army (1917–1919); United States Army Reserve (1917–?)
- Years of service: 1898–1919
- Rank: Lieutenant Colonel
- Unit: Company B, 1st West Virginia Infantry Regiment (1898); Judge Advocate General's Corps (1917–1919)
- Commands: Company B, 1st West Virginia Infantry Regiment (1898)
- Battles/wars: Spanish–American War; World War I

John Baker White DSO (August 24, 1868 – June 2, 1944) was an American lawyer, military officer, and Democratic politician in the U.S. state of West Virginia. White served as a captain in the West Virginia National Guard during the Spanish–American War and as a lieutenant colonel in the United States Army Judge Advocate General's Corps during World War I. White was a member of the City Council and Board of Affairs of Charleston, West Virginia from 1907 to 1911, and frequently served as the city's mayor pro tempore. He was later appointed a member of the West Virginia Board of Control, where he served as the board's treasurer, secretary, and president at various times.

White was a member of the White political family of Virginia and West Virginia and was the son of Hampshire County Clerk of Court and West Virginia Fish Commission President Christian Streit White (1839–1917) and the grandson of Hampshire County Clerk of Court John Baker White (1794–1862). White was a nephew of West Virginia Attorney General Robert White (1833–1915).

== Early life and education ==
John Baker White was born on August 24, 1868, in Romney, West Virginia. He was the only child of Hampshire County Clerk of Court Christian Streit White (1839–1917) with his first wife Elizabeth "Bessie" Jane Schultze White (1837–1869) and the eldest of his father's five children. He was a grandson of Hampshire County Clerk of Court John Baker White (1794–1862), for whom White was named, and a great-grandson of the prominent Virginia judge Robert White (1759–1831). His uncle Robert White (1833–1915) served as Attorney General of West Virginia. Through his descent from Robert White and Reverend Christian Streit, White was eligible for and attained membership in the Society of the Cincinnati and Sons of the American Revolution.

White received an English education in both the local public schools and at his father's residence in Romney. White further supplemented his education with "broadened courses of reading and private study". Beginning at the age of 13, White attended school from 9 a.m. until 4 p.m. and worked on his family's farm before and after school, and during holidays. At the age of 16, White left his schooling to work on the farm and in his father's county court clerk office while studying privately at home.

== Early political career ==
White departed his home in Romney for Charleston, West Virginia, where he was entirely dependent upon himself and his own resources. There, White commenced his career in public service in 1886 when he began serving as a messenger in the office of West Virginia Secretary of State Henry S. Walker. He received successive promotions within the Secretary of State's office beginning with clerk, then to stationery clerk, and finally to chief clerk of the office during the latter part of Walker's term in office. White was retained as the chief clerk of the office by Walker's successor, William A. Ohley. White was affiliated with the Secretary of State's office for seven years. He continued to fulfill that position until March 8, 1893, when he was appointed to serve as the private secretary to West Virginia Governor William A. MacCorkle. As a representative of Governor MacCorkle, White traveled across the state to high-profile events, such as the June 1895 strikes at the Crozier Works on Elkhorn Creek in McDowell County, to urge calm and to provide the governor with situational awareness on the strike. White performed as Governor MacCorkle's private secretary for four years until the end of his administration's term in 1897.

During the West Virginia general elections of 1892 and 1896, White was recognized for his leadership efforts in support of the campaigns of Democratic candidates.

== Law career ==
While he was employed at the West Virginia State Capitol, White began studying jurisprudence with legal coursebooks. He undertook his study of jurisprudence in the law firm of Chilton, MacCorkle and Chilton in Charleston. White was admitted to the bar in 1897 and afterward established a law practice in Charleston. White's practice began arguing cases in county, state, and federal level courts within West Virginia. On December 19, 1901, the West Virginia Secretary of State office issued a charter authorizing $100,000 in capital stock for the incorporation of Midland Railway, of which White was a corporator with one subscribed share of $100.

== Military career ==
In 1888, White volunteered his service in the West Virginia National Guard, where he entered service with the rank of Private. White was gradually promoted and served in the West Virginia National Guard's 2nd Battalion, 2nd West Virginia Infantry Regiment. White and his regiment were dispatched to the scenes of several strikes throughout West Virginia, where he performed as "a special representative" of the governor.

=== Spanish–American War ===
At the onset of the Spanish–American War and shortly after his admission to the bar in 1898, White again volunteered for service with the West Virginia National Guard and served throughout the duration of the war. He received his commission from West Virginia Governor George W. Atkinson as captain in command of Company B of the 1st West Virginia Infantry Regiment in the United States Volunteers. During his service in the Spanish–American War, White received a promotion to the rank of Major. After a year of serving with his regiment in the war, White received an honorable discharge and vacated the West Virginia National Guard following ten years of service in the guard as a military officer. According to Governor Atkinson in his Bench and Bar of West Virginia (1919), White "served faithfully and efficiently until the close of the war".

=== World War I ===
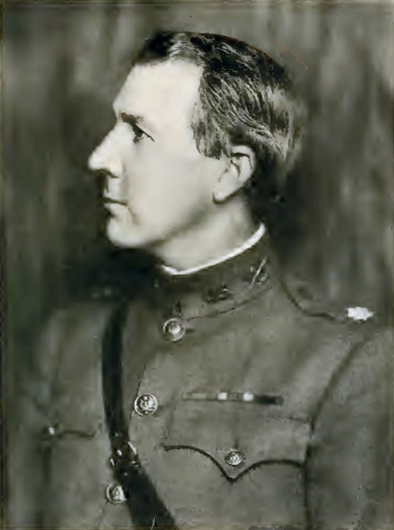
Major John Baker White (pictured), Judge Advocate General's Corps, photographed c. 1917 during World War I

Following the entry of the United States into World War I in April 1917, White tendered his legal services to the United States Army and served in the Judge Advocate General's Corps. White had previously attempted to enter the service of the U.S. Army through its various training schools to serve in World War I, but he had been rebuffed each time due to his advanced age of 49. On December 6, 1917, White received "special permission" from President Woodrow Wilson to serve in the Army's Judge Advocate General's Corps with the rank of major. Upon receiving his commission, White was ordered to London where he served as Assistant Judge Advocate General for United States Armed Forces personnel serving in the United Kingdom of Great Britain and Ireland. White continued to carry out his duties in London until June 1919, by which time the war was over, when his base section there was closed and he was transferred to the United States military's general headquarters in France.

From France, White deployed to the 3rd Division occupation headquarters in Koblenz, Germany, along the Rhine where he served as the division's Judge Advocate General. While serving in that position in Koblenz, White was promoted to the rank of lieutenant colonel in April 1919. He continued to serve as the Judge Advocate General for the 3rd Division until September 1919, and shortly thereafter White was discharged from the U.S. Army and subsequently transferred to the United States Army Reserve.

For his service to the Allies in World War I, White was created a Companion of the Distinguished Service Order by George V on behalf of the British Empire. Following his relief from active military service in Europe, White embarked upon a global journey that consisted of Egypt, Palestine, India, Burma, the Malay Peninsula, Java, China, Japan, and the Philippines. He returned to the United States in June 1920 and soon thereafter resumed his law practice in Charleston.

== Later political career ==
Following his service in the Spanish–American War, White ran for election as a Democrat and won a seat on the Charleston City Council. White also concurrently fulfilled a four-year term from 1907 to 1911 as a member of the Charleston Board of Affairs during the period in which Charleston was organized under a commission form of government. While serving on the Board of Affairs, he frequently performed duties as the city's mayor pro tempore. Around 1931, White became a member of the West Virginia Board of Control and was serving as the board's treasurer by 1932. White later served as the board's president for two years. In 1939, Governor Homer A. Holt reappointed White to serve another term on the West Virginia Board of Control ending on June 30, 1941.

== Marriage ==
On August 22, 1939, White married Mary Ann Williamson near Malvern in Chester County, Pennsylvania. Williamson was a native of Berkeley County, West Virginia, but resided in Athens, West Virginia, at the time of her marriage. Williamson was a graduate of Shepherd College in Shepherdstown, of Concord College in Athens, and of the University of Kentucky in Lexington. She had been a member of the faculty at Marshall College in Huntington since 1934.

== Later life and death ==
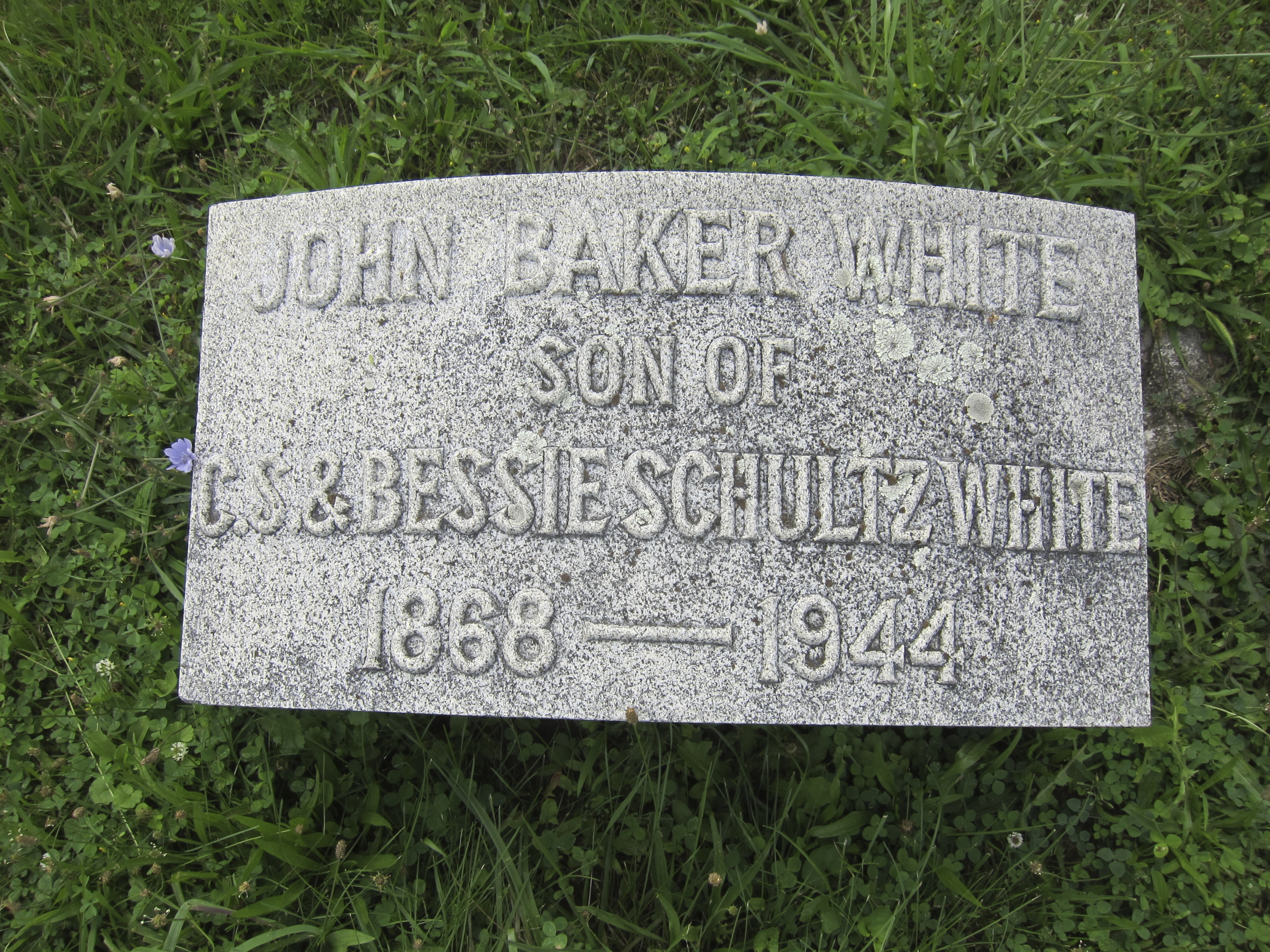
Gravestone (pictured) at the interment site of John Baker White at Indian Mound Cemetery in Romney, West Virginia.

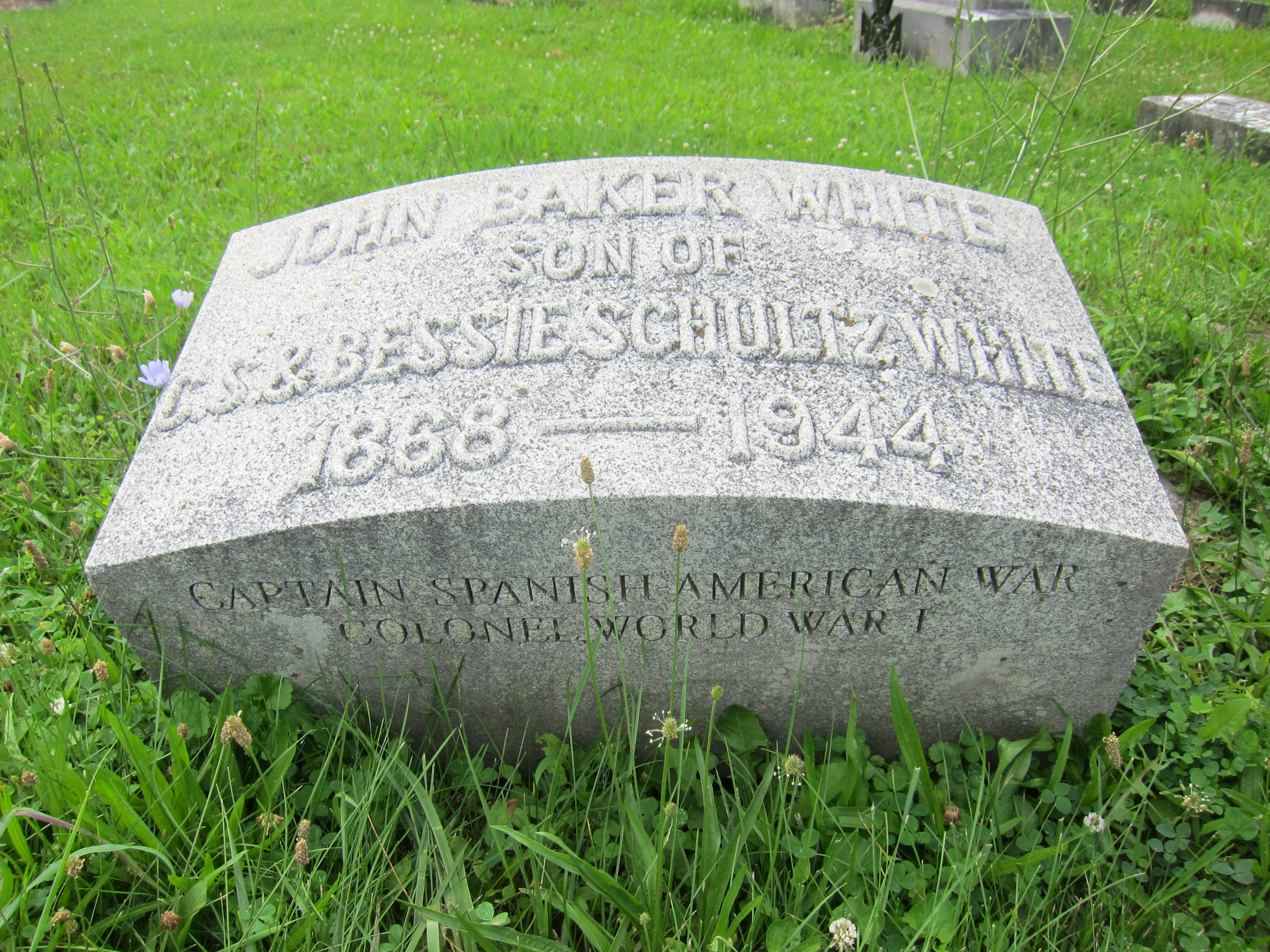
White's service in the Spanish–American War and World War I memorialized on the facade (pictured) of his gravestone.

In his later years, White and his wife resided in St. Petersburg, Florida during the winter season. White died of heart failure on June 2, 1944, at 1 p.m. at the age of 75 at his summer camp near Rupert, Greenbrier County, West Virginia. The medical certification of White's death stated the cause of his heart failure was due to age and overexertion. White's funeral was held in Charleston, and he was interred in the White family burial plot at Indian Mound Cemetery in Romney. At the time of his death, White was residing at 610 1/2 Capitol Street in Charleston.

== Affiliations and community service ==
White was a practicing Mason and Knights Templar affiliated with Royal Arch Masonry and the Thirty-second Degree Ancient and Accepted Scottish Rite of Freemasonry. In addition to the Society of the Cincinnati and the Sons of the American Revolution, White was also a member of the Military Order of Foreign Wars, United Spanish War Veterans, American Legion, and the Shriners.

White was also an inaugural stockholder and member in the Henry G. Davis Club, named for United States Senator from West Virginia Henry G. Davis, which received its charter on May 31, 1906. The Henry G. Davis Club was founded "for the study of political economy and the science of self-government; for the education of the young men of the State of West Virginia in these sciences and the promulgation of such information, literature and statistics as will in the judgment of its directors be best suited for such purposes". White also served on the Entertainment Committee for the West Virginia Homecoming Week in Point Pleasant which took place October 7–10, 1909, to celebrate the Battle of Point Pleasant and the unveiling of the monument to that battle.

== Legacy ==
In his Bench and Bar of West Virginia (1919), Atkinson remarked of White's service in Charleston city government: "His chief aim was to render a service that would advance the interests of the people, without showing favors to any class or classes of the citizens of Charleston. His service in that high office marked him as a man of high honor, firmness and probity." Atkinson remarked further of White: "Such men are rarely found in this or any other portion of this wide world which we inhabit."

In 1940, the four-story "Boys Dormitory" at Concord College (presently known as Concord University) in Athens, West Virginia, was renamed "John Baker White Hall" in honor of White, who was then serving as Secretary of the West Virginia Board of Control. White Hall was demolished in 2004 for the construction of Concord University's Rahall Technology Center.

== Bibliography ==
- Atkinson, George Wesley (1919). Bench and Bar of West Virginia. Charleston, West Virginia: Virginia Law Book Company. OCLC 8899470.
- Badgley, C. Stephen (2010). A Point of Controversy: The Battle of Point Pleasant. Canal Winchester, Ohio: Badgley Publishing Company. ISBN 978-1-4564-5646-7. Archived from the original on April 12, 2017.
- Brannon, Selden W., ed. (1976). Historic Hampshire: A Symposium of Hampshire County and Its People, Past and Present. Parsons, West Virginia: McClain Printing Company. ISBN 978-0-87012-236-1. OCLC 3121468.
- Callahan, James Morton (1923a). History of West Virginia, Old and New, Volume 2. Chicago, Illinois, and New York City, New York: American Historical Society. OCLC 373051.
- Callahan, James Morton (1923b). History of West Virginia, Old and New, Volume 3. Chicago, Illinois, and New York City, New York: American Historical Society. OCLC 373051.
- Maxwell, Hu; Swisher, Howard Llewellyn (1897). History of Hampshire County, West Virginia From Its Earliest Settlement to the Present. Morgantown, West Virginia: A. Brown Boughner, Printer. OCLC 680931891. OL 23304577M.
- Virkus, Frederick Adams; Marquis, Albert Nelson (1926). The Compendium of American Genealogy: First Families of America; the Standard Genealogical Encyclopedia of the United States, Volume 2. Chicago, Illinois: F. A. Virkus & Company. OCLC 62499518. Archived from the original on April 12, 2017.
- Harris, John T., ed. (1919). West Virginia Legislative Hand Book and Manual and Official Register, 1919. Charleston, West Virginia: The Tribune Printing Company. OCLC 34496611. Archived from the original on April 12, 2017.
- West Virginia Secretary of State (1903). Report of the Secretary of State, Ex Officio Superintendent Public Printing, and Secretary Board of Public Works. Charleston, West Virginia: The Tribune Printing Company. OCLC 795130934. Archived from the original on April 12, 2017.
- West Virginia Secretary of State (1907). Corporation Report of Secretary of State: March 4, 1905, to March 1, 1907. Charters Issued to and Other Proceedings Concerning Corporations. Charleston, West Virginia: The Crossman Printing Company. OCLC 12987568.
