= Christian Streit White =

American military officer, lawyer, court clerk, pisciculturist, and politician

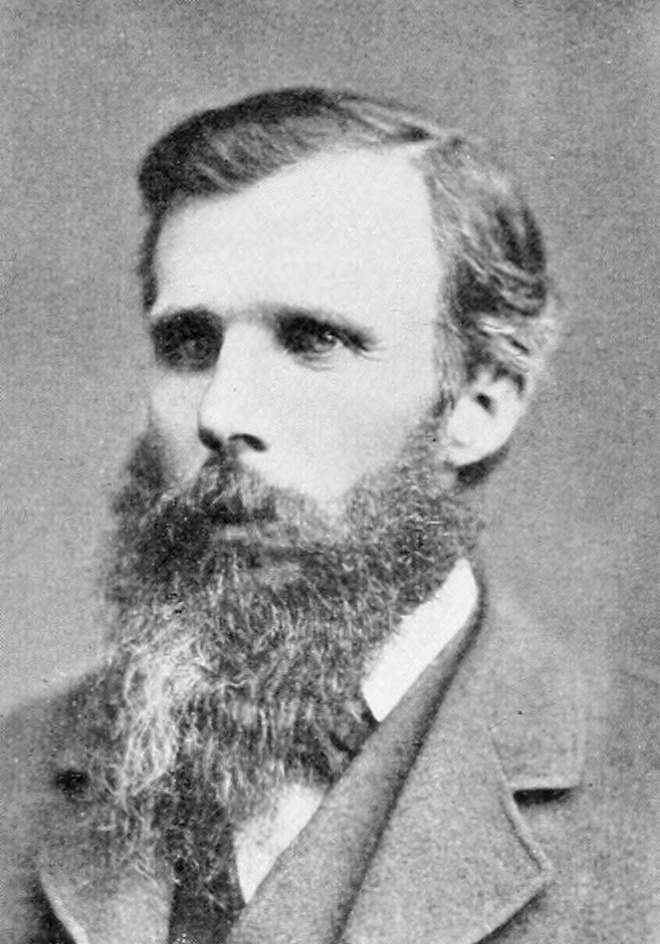
- Portrait of Christian Streit White

President of the West Virginia Fish Commission
- In office 1885–?
- Preceded by: Henry B. Miller

Clerk of Court for Hampshire County
- In office 1873–1902
- Preceded by: James A. Parsons
- Succeeded by: Charles W. Haines

Clerk of Circuit Court for Hampshire County
- In office 1873–1876
- Preceded by: C. M. Taylor
- Succeeded by: V. M. Poling

Personal details
- Born: March 10, 1839 Romney, Virginia (now West Virginia), United States
- Died: January 28, 1917 (aged 77) Romney, West Virginia, United States
- Resting place: Indian Mound Cemetery, Romney, West Virginia, United States
- Party: Democratic Party
- Spouse(s): Elizabeth "Bessie" Jane Schultze Catharine Steele
- Relations: John Baker White (father); Frances Ann Streit (mother); Robert White (grandfather); Robert White (brother); Francis White (great-uncle)
- Children: John Baker White; Louisa Anna White; Robert White; Christian Streit White, Jr.; Elizabeth "Bessie" Adelphia White Howard
- Education: Potomac Seminary
- Occupation: Military officer; lawyer; court clerk; pisciculturist; politician

Military service
- Allegiance: Confederate States of America
- Branch/service: Confederate States Army
- Years of service: 1861–1865
- Rank: Captain
- Unit: 13th Virginia Infantry; 23rd Virginia Cavalry
- Battles/wars: American Civil War

Christian Streit White (March 10, 1839 – January 28, 1917) was an American military officer, lawyer, court clerk, pisciculturist, and politician in the U.S. states of Virginia and West Virginia.

During the American Civil War, White served as a sergeant major and captain in the Confederate States Army and headed a bureau of the Confederate States Department of the Treasury. White served under the commands of Stonewall Jackson and Jubal Early and was responsible for the safekeeping of Hampshire County's land registration records from destruction by Union Army forces. From 1864 to 1865, White was in command of Company C of the 23rd Virginia Volunteer Cavalry Regiment.

White served as the Clerk of Court for Hampshire County, West Virginia, for 29 years (1873–1902), and also served as the Clerk of Circuit Court for Hampshire County (1873–1876). He was the chairman of the Hampshire County Democratic Executive Committee in the 1870s, and during this leadership, registered members of the West Virginia Democratic Party grew from 449 to 1,369 in 1876. White was appointed by West Virginia Governor John J. Jacob as one of the inaugural commissioners of the West Virginia Fish Commission. He established the Maguire Springs fish hatchery near Romney, and for a time, served as the commission's president.

White was a member of the White political family of Virginia and West Virginia and was the son of John Baker White (1794–1862), a grandson of prominent Virginia judge Robert White (1759–1831), and a great-nephew of United States House Representative Francis White (1761–1826). He was a younger brother of West Virginia Attorney General Robert White (1833–1915).

== Family and background ==
Christian Streit White was born on March 10, 1839, in Romney, Virginia (present-day West Virginia). He was the second-eldest son of Hampshire County Clerk of Court John Baker White (1794–1862) and his second wife Frances Ann Streit White (c. 1809–1879) and a grandson of prominent Virginia judge Robert White (1759–1831). His older brother Robert White (1833–1915) later served as Attorney General of West Virginia. He was likely named for his maternal grandfather Reverend Christian Streit, a Lutheran minister of Winchester, Virginia, who was of Swiss descent. White received his education at Potomac Seminary in Romney.

== American Civil War service ==
On April 19, 1861, following the outbreak of the American Civil War, White enlisted as a private in the Hampshire Guards, which later became Company K within the 13th Virginia Volunteer Infantry Regiment of the Army of Virginia. While Company K was under the command of Captain John B. Sherrard, White was promoted to Third Sergeant. White's company under the command of Sherrard departed Romney in June 1861. Within four to five months, White was successively promoted through the non-commissioned officer ranks to sergeant major and acting adjutant of the 13th Virginia Infantry. He was further promoted to Adjutant, but White did not receive a commission. White served in the 13th Virginia Infantry for a little over a year until he was discharged from his service on account of a disability. White had developed typhoid fever and was ordered to recover in a hospital in Staunton.

Following his recovery and during his convalescence in the winter of 1862 and 1863, White first served as a clerk in the Confederate States Department of the Treasury in Richmond, and he later received a post as head of an entire bureau of the department. White's father John Baker White also served in the Confederate States Department of the Treasury until his death on October 9, 1862. In spring 1863, White had recovered enough from his disability to serve in the cavalry, although he was still unable to serve in the infantry.

White resigned from his post as head of a bureau in the Confederate States Department of the Treasury when he received a commission of captain from Confederate States President Jefferson Davis. Under the terms of his commission from President Davis, White raised a company of 200 cavalrymen for "special service" from within Union-controlled areas of Virginia. The "special service" company was to include reconnaissance scouts or espionage personnel. White began recruitment of his company from several Virginia counties and neighboring states within Union control. His company was charged with reconnaissance within the mountainous region of Virginia spanning Greenbrier, Pocahontas, Highland, Pendleton, Randolph, Hardy, and Hampshire counties. The "special service" company under White's command became Company C of the 23rd Virginia Volunteer Cavalry Regiment. White's company initially consisted of 20 men from the Confederate States Department of the Treasury in Richmond, and after further recruitment, he raised a company numbering 300 men, although he was only permitted to retain 120 men. The remaining recruits sought service under D. E. Beall of Hampshire County, and subsequently joined the cavalry of General John D. Imboden. His brother, Alexander White, served as the company's first lieutenant and J. R. Baker served as the company's second lieutenant. White declined subsequent promotions, and remained in command of his company until the conclusion of the American Civil War in 1865.

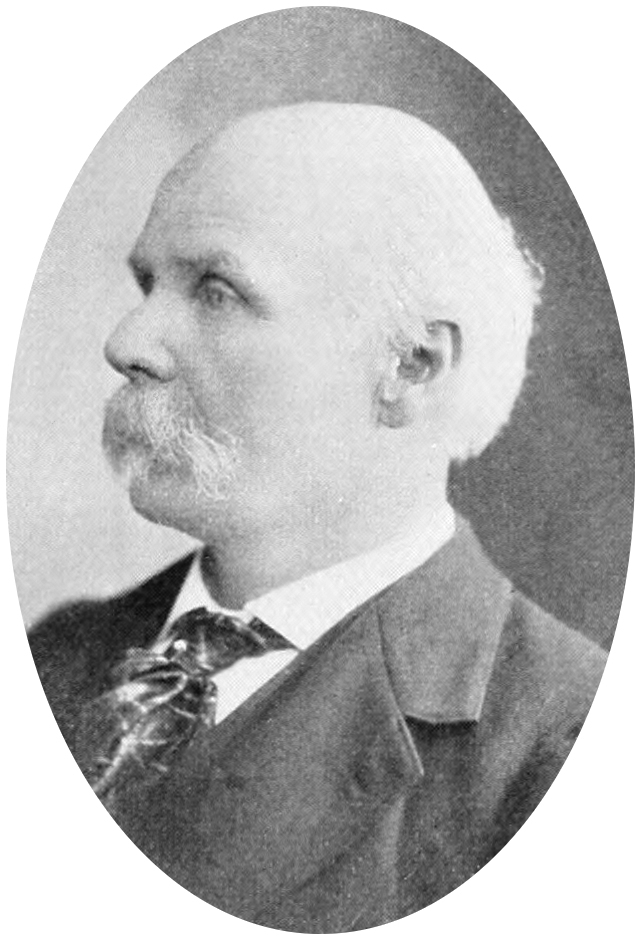
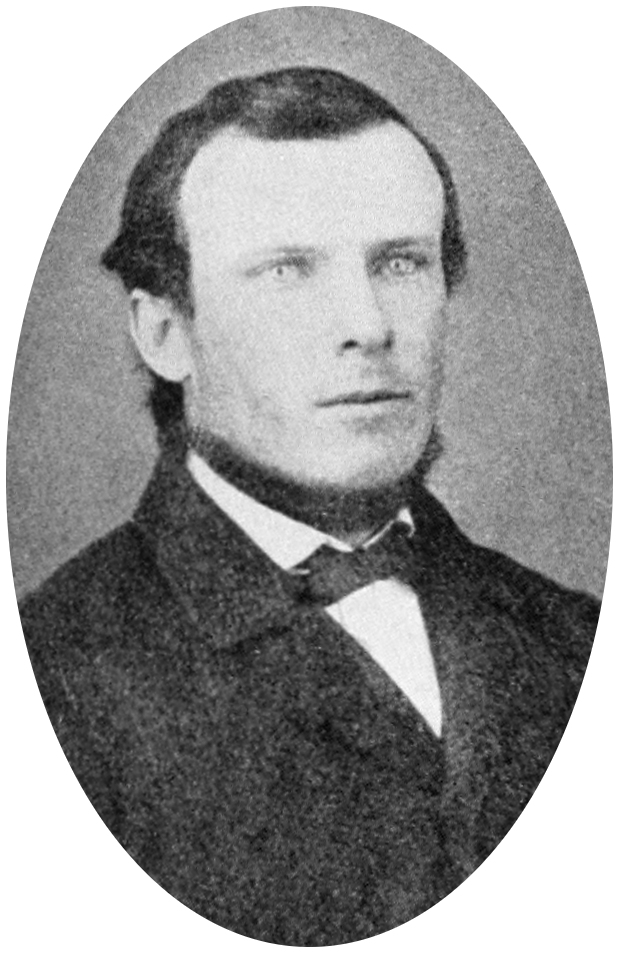
White's brothers: Robert White (left) and Alexander White (right).

White and his company saw combat from early 1864 through the early 1865. During the summer of 1865 alone, White's company participated in 56 battles and skirmishes, including picket fights, with two men killed, 26 men wounded (four of which later died as a result of their wounds), and ten men taken prisoner. By October 1, 1864, White's company had 15 serviceable horses and 70 that were not serviceable. Between 1863 and 1865, White received one severe wound (from June 21, 1864) and two minor wounds from various campaigns. White felt the effects of these wounds for the remainder of his life. Throughout his military service during the American Civil War, White served under the commands of Stonewall Jackson and Jubal Early.

Following the surrender of General Robert E. Lee on April 9, 1865, White and the remaining part of his company traveled to North Carolina to join Confederate Army forces under the command of General Joseph E. Johnston, but Johnston and his forces had already surrendered before White and his troops could reach them. White and the remnants of his company disbanded without surrendering or being paroled, and White returned to Romney around June 1, 1865.

=== Preservation of Hampshire County land records ===
White's father, Hampshire County Clerk of Court John Baker White, learned of the advancement of Union Army forces on Romney, and became concerned for the safety of the county's records. His father proceeded to load land registration records ledger books onto wagons and had them transported to Winchester, Virginia, for safekeeping. In 1863, when Winchester was no longer a safe location for the storage of Hampshire County's land records and they again risked destruction by Union Army forces, Christian Streit White took responsibility for the records and transferred them to Front Royal. When Front Royal became endangered by advancing Union Army forces, White had the records moved to Luray Caverns where they remained for several months. In fall 1864, the county's record books were rescued by White and his company as Union Army troops were in the process of destroying them. White's company loaded about 150 record books into a wagon and they were taken to North Carolina where they remained safely for the duration of the war. Hampshire County's land records survived and were returned to the courthouse following the conclusion of the American Civil War, likely by a soldier returning to the area from North Carolina. Had White's father John Baker White not separated the records and sent the bound volumes away for safekeeping, Hampshire County would have lost all its records during the course of the war, as those that remained in the courthouse were destroyed.

== Political career ==
=== Clerk of Court for Hampshire County ===
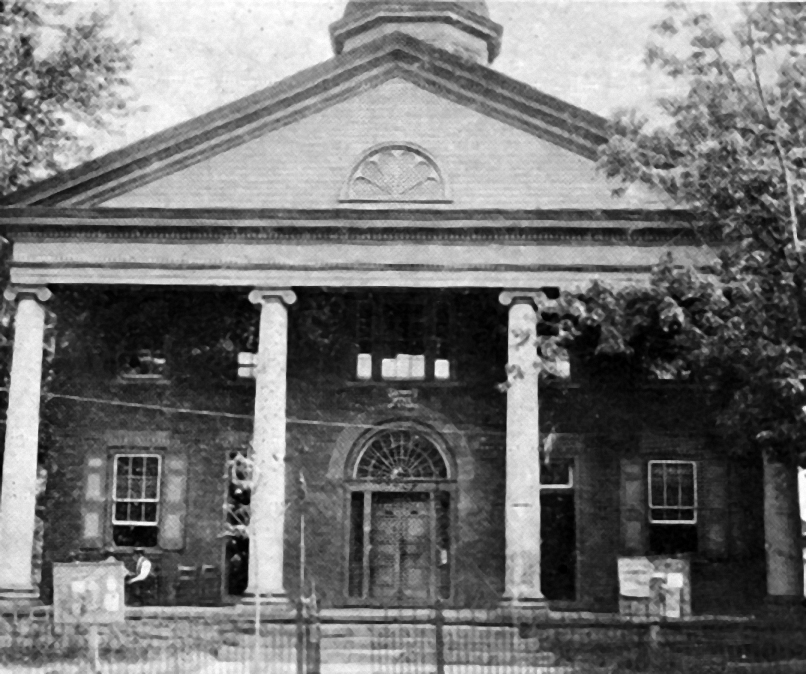
The Hampshire County Courthouse in Romney, where Christian Streit White served as Clerk of Court for Hampshire County. This courthouse was built in 1833 and remained in service until it burned in 1921.

Following his return from the war to his hometown of Romney in June 1865, White was unable to recommence his practice of law or hold a public office due to the existing state laws of the Constitution of West Virginia which disbarred former Confederate States government and military personnel. White's situation was further complicated, as he had not been pardoned or paroled by the United States for his service in the Confederate States Army. White rented a farm in Hampshire County and engaged in successful agricultural pursuits until the disenfranchisement of former Confederates was struck from the state's constitution in 1872. In 1872, White was elected to the position of Clerk of Court for Hampshire County and began his term the following year in 1873. During his tenure as Clerk of Court for Hampshire County, White also served one term as Clerk of the Circuit Court between 1873 and 1876, but declined to run for a second term in that office. Prior to the American Civil War, White's father John Baker White had also served as the county's Clerk of Court for 47 years between 1815 and 1861. White served as Clerk of Court for Hampshire County for 29 years until 1902. He and his father served in the position a combined total of 76 years. Also following the war, White was elected as a member of the Romney Literary Society.

=== Hampshire County Democratic Executive Committee ===
By 1876, White was serving as the chairman of the Hampshire County Democratic Executive Committee. While holding this post, White organized and carried out extensive campaigning for West Virginia Democratic Party membership and political candidates. Through his efforts, the number of registered Democrats in Hampshire County swelled from 449 in the preceding election year to 1,369.

During the West Virginia Democratic Party Senatorial Convention held at Moorefield in August 1886, White proposed and advocated the first tariff reform and anti-monopoly resolutions ever passed and adopted by a West Virginia Democratic Party Convention. Prior to its passage at the convention, White's proposal received strong opposition. Tariff reform and anti-monopoly resolutions similar to White's proposal were adopted by the national Democratic Party as part of its 1888 platform. White had been among the first Democratic Party members in Hampshire County to openly declare his opposition to the fiscal policies of the administration of United States President Grover Cleveland. Under White's leadership, Hampshire County's Democratic delegation was the first Democratic county organization in West Virginia to hold public meetings in opposition to Cleveland's fiscal policies. As the county executive committee chairman, White was the first Democrat in Hampshire County to deliver a public speech denouncing these policies. By 1897, White had participated as a delegate from Hampshire County to most of the senatorial and congressional Democratic Party conventions in West Virginia, and every state gubernatorial convention with the exception of one.

White was described by George W. Atkinson in his Prominent Men of West Virginia (1890) as "a consistent, but liberal Democrat" and by historians Roberta R. Munske and Wilmer L. Kerns in their Hampshire County, West Virginia, 1754–2004 (2004) as "a self-proclaimed liberal Democrat." West Virginia historians Hu Maxwell and Howard Llewellyn Swisher in their History of Hampshire County (1897) stated that White was "independent in thought and character and fearless in following his convictions, he has never been a follower of party leaders."

=== West Virginia Fish Commission ===
On February 20, 1877, an act entitled "Act to increase the supply of food fishes in the rivers and waters of this State" was passed by the West Virginia Legislature creating the West Virginia Fish Commission for the purpose of propagating pisciculture for the stocking of streams in West Virginia to transform them into viable fisheries. White was appointed by West Virginia Governor John J. Jacob as one of the inaugural commissioners on June 1, 1877, along with John W. Harris of Greenbrier County and Henry B. Miller of Wheeling. White was appointed for a term of four years. The newly appointed commission convened on July 17, 1877, and White was elected its secretary and Harris as its president. White and his two commissioner colleagues were "dedicated to their cause," but their beginning efforts faced opposition from public officials who did not understand the importance of the fish commission.

White embarked upon a search for potential locations for a state fish hatchery, and in the summer of 1877, he purchased the Maguire Springs and 2.5 acres (1.0 ha) near Romney from Charles Harmison of Valley View. At the Maguire Springs, White "erected and equipped" a fish hatchery costing $700 at his own expense, and by 1878, the hatchery was in "successful operation" and 600,000 fishes had been distributed from it. The West Virginia Fish Commission later purchased from White the Maguire Springs and the surrounding 0.75 acres (0.30 ha) for $550. In 1880, the Maguire Springs hatchery was vastly improved and expanded with the construction of ponds and the erection of a fence around the hatchery facility. In 1885, a residence was constructed at the hatchery for the facility's manager. Following Miller's resignation from the commission, White was appointed as the President of the West Virginia Fish Commission in June 1885. By June 1886, the hatchery ponds at the Maguire Springs were enlarged and in 1891, a hatching house was built along with additions to the manager's residence, all under White's direction. White also personally served as the manager of the Maguire Springs fish hatchery during hiatuses between manager appointments. By 1893, fish populations within the streams of West Virginia became self-sustaining and the hatchery operations at Maguire Springs were discontinued.

In 1877, United States Fish Commissioner Spencer Fullerton Baird requested that West Virginia introduce the Chinook salmon into its streams. The West Virginia Fish Commission's "first and most expensive efforts" involved the hatching and stocking of the salmon in West Virginia's streams. To accomplish this feat, White designed and built charcoal raceways to culture the salmon. The salmon were released into the South Branch Potomac River where they flourished and were caught by fishermen from Romney to Washington, D.C. The salmon introduced by White and the commission migrated to the Chesapeake Bay, but did not return to West Virginia's streams to spawn. Between 1877 and 1882, the West Virginia Fish Commission successfully hatched and distributed salmon, trout, black bass, shad, carp, gray bass, pike perch, silver perch, jack, and blue catfish, as well as mill pond roach as food for the bass. (Note: Maxwell & Swisher 1897, p. 325. According to West Virginia historians Hu Maxwell and Howard Llewellyn Swisher in their History of Hampshire County (1897), the West Virginia Fish Commission hatched and distributed the following types and numbers of fish into West Virginia's streams: "In the years 1877–78 about 675,000 salmon, 100,000 trout, 1,200 black bass, most of them large enough to spawn, were distributed. In the years 1879–80 there were distributed 360,000 salmon, 165,000 shad, 600 carp, 2,000 gray bass and 1,400 native fish (black bass, pike, perch, jack and blue catfish), together with large numbers of mill-pond roach, as food for the bass. In 1881 and 1882 the commission put out 18,500 land-locked salmon, 7,000 trout, 2,000 carp, 600 black bass, 125 silver perch, 25 pike perch.") In a report to the United States Fish Commission on the quality of the hatchery's carp, White wrote: "One small scale carp, accidentally killed in draining the pond, was fried as pan-fish, eaten in my family, and pronounced good."

Over a decade after his appointment to the commission, White and his colleagues continued to perform their duties of office without pay from the West Virginia Legislature. The legislature continued to authorize $500 annually for the hatching and stocking of fish in West Virginia's streams. White was reappointed as a commissioner by each succeeding Democratic governor. For the majority of his tenure serving on the West Virginia Fish Commission, White held the post of the commission's president.

== Confederate memorial activities ==
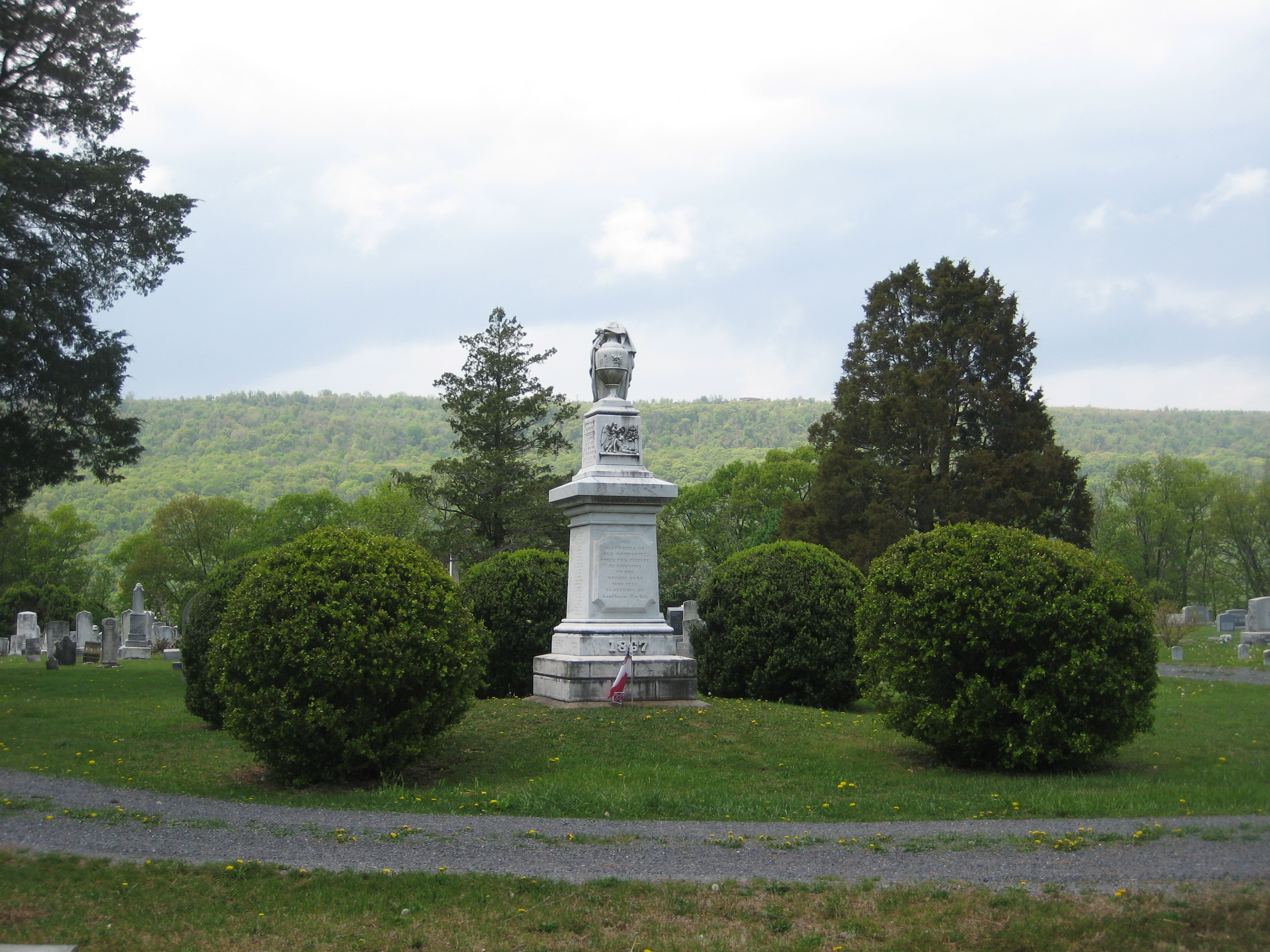
The Confederate Memorial at Indian Mound Cemetery in Romney, West Virginia. Dedicated on September 26, 1867, the idea for the memorial had originated between White, his brother Robert White and his wife, his sister Fannie White, and his future wife Bessie Jane Schultze.

In spring 1866 while at the residence of his brother Robert White in Romney, White, his brother Robert and his wife, his sister Fannie White, and Bessie Jane Schultze (later White's wife) originated the idea of erecting a monument memorializing the Confederate dead. This discussion led to the first decoration of Confederate graves at Indian Mound Cemetery in Romney on June 1, 1866, and to the subsequent erection of the Confederate Memorial at Indian Mound Cemetery which was dedicated on September 26, 1867.

From its formation until June 1897, White served as the Commander of Camp Hampshire Number 446 of the United Confederate Veterans, the first camp organized in West Virginia. At the United Confederate Veterans headquarters in New Orleans on August 24, 1895, White was appointed by General John Brown Gordon as one of the inaugural members of the committee for the Confederate Memorial Association, which was charged with organizing and consolidating the association and selecting its chairman. White and the committee was also responsible for the erection of a "great building or memorial hall" known as the "Battle Abbey of the South," which had been proposed by former Confederate States Army private Charles Broadway Rouss. White and the committee nominated General George H. Steuart as the chairman of the Confederate Memorial Association at Gate City Guard Armory in Atlanta on October 19, 1865, where Colonel J. O. Murray served as White's proxy. White's failing health caused him to resign from his position on the committee in early 1897 and upon the acceptance of his resignation, his brother Robert White was appointed to replace him.

== Business pursuits ==
On February 23, 1871, the West Virginia Legislature passed an act incorporating the South Branch Railway Company, responsible for the construction and operation of a branch line connecting Romney with the Baltimore and Ohio Railroad main line at Green Spring. White was named by the legislature as one of the commissioners of the South Branch Railway Company, charged with the responsibility of signing up investors to purchase capital stock in the company.

In 1890, White was a shareholder in two corporations operating in Romney. As one of five corporators, White held one share, valued at $130, in the Hampshire Building and Loan Association No. 1, which raised money for the purpose of providing loans for the purchase of property, home improvement or construction, and the liquidation of liens on property. Hampshire Building and Loan Association No. 1 was incorporated by West Virginia Secretary of State Henry S. Walker on March 11, 1890. White was one of six corporators, with two shares ($35 each), of the Romney Manufacturing, Land and Improvement Company, which was created for the acquisition of land near Romney for the establishment of a hotel or summer resort and the development of residential real estate. The Romney Manufacturing, Land and Improvement Company was incorporated by Walker's successor, William A. Ohley, on July 10, 1890.

== Later life and death ==
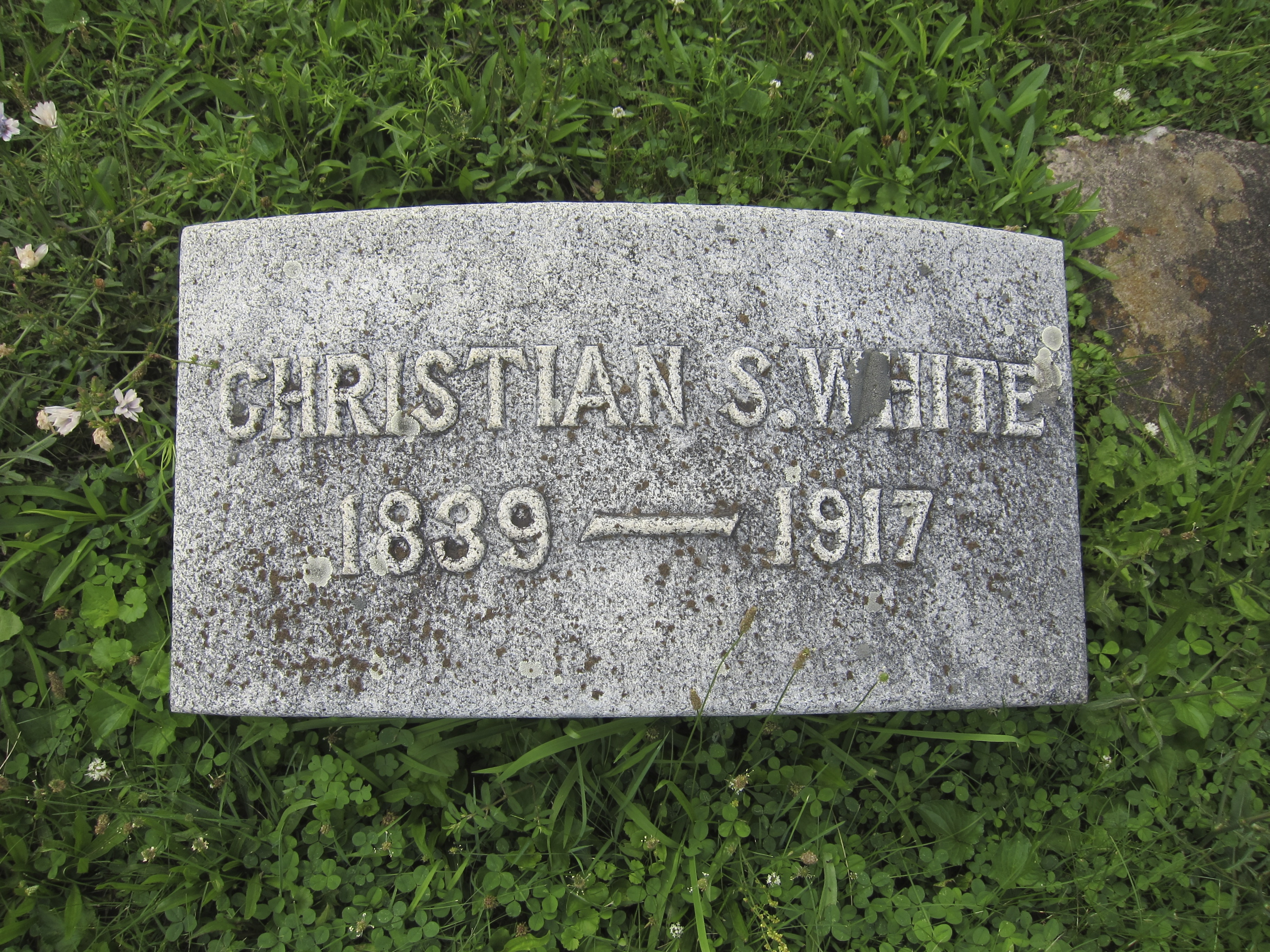
Gravestone at the interment site of Christian Streit White at Indian Mound Cemetery in Romney, West Virginia

White continued to serve in public office late into his life, and by 1916, he was serving as a chancery commissioner for Hampshire County along with his son Robert and Joshua Soule Zimmerman. White also continued to operate a law practice with his son Robert in Romney. White died in Hampshire County on January 28, 1917, at the age of 77. He was interred next to his first wife Bessie Jane Schultze and second wife Catharine Steele in the White family plot at Indian Mound Cemetery in Romney.

== Personal life ==
A practicing member of the Presbyterian faith, White was a Mason in the Clinton Lodge of Romney, where he had served as a Master. He resided at 332 East Main Street in Romney.

=== Marriage and issue ===
White was married on July 25, 1867, in Hampshire County to Elizabeth "Bessie" Jane Schultze, the daughter of Dr. Robert Schultze and his wife Elizabeth "Bessie" Armstrong Schultze. Schultze was born on November 18, 1837, in Rotterdam, Netherlands and was of Scottish descent. Her father, Dr. Robert Schultze, was a professor of foreign languages at the University of Edinburgh. Schultze's father also served in the British Diplomatic Service. White and his wife Bessie had one child, a son:

Name	Birth date	Death date	Spouse
John Baker White	August 24, 1868	June 2, 1944	Mary Ann Williamson, married on August 22, 1939

Following the death of his first wife, Bessie, on June 24, 1869, White again married on May 26, 1873, to Catharine Steele. Steele was born in Belfast or Dublin and was the daughter of Thomas G. Steele in Fairmont, West Virginia, at the time of her marriage to White. Steele arrived in the United States at the age of seven and was raised in Fairmont. Steele's father was a native of Dublin and was the first secretary of the Grand Lodge of Odd Fellows of West Virginia. White and his wife Catharine had four children, two sons and two daughters:

Name	Birth date	Death date	Spouse
Louisa Anna White	March 15, 1874	January 10, 1931	Unmarried
Robert White	May 28, 1876	August 15, 1935	Mabel Glasscock Fitch, married on January 7, 1903
Christian Streit White Jr.	June 10, 1881	December 2, 1956	
Elizabeth "Bessie" Adelphia White Howard	July 23, 1885		Benjamin Chew Howard, married on October 7, 1913

White's second wife, Catharine, died in 1911 in Romney and was interred at Indian Mound Cemetery.

== Personal possessions ==
White owned a number of antiques and pieces of furniture of historical interest. Among these were items once possessed by Thomas Fairfax, 6th Lord Fairfax of Cameron including a pair of andirons with heavy brass heads and a fender, possibly used at Lord Fairfax's Greenway Court estate. White also had a richly inlaid table made of several types of wood, which once belonged to his grandfather, Virginia judge Robert White. Beneath the table's framework was pasted a small slip of paper on which Robert White signed his name and the date, 1789. Historian Hu Maxwell noted the similarity between the handwriting of White, his father John Baker White, and his grandfather Robert White. White also owned a sugar bowl from Switzerland that had originated in China and had been in the possession of the Streit and White families for over two centuries.

== Bibliography ==
- American Fish Cultural Association (1881). Transactions of the American Fish Cultural Association Tenth Annual Meeting. New York City, New York: American Fish Cultural Association. OCLC 4900935305. Archived from the original on January 3, 2014.
- Atkinson, George Wesley (1919). Bench and Bar of West Virginia. Charleston, West Virginia: Virginia Law Book Company. OCLC 8899470.
- Atkinson, George Wesley; Gibbens, Alvaro Franklin (1890). Prominent Men of West Virginia: Biographical Sketches of Representative Men in Every Honorable Vocation, Including Politics, the Law, Theology, Medicine, Education, Finance, Journalism, Trade, Commerce and Agriculture. Wheeling, West Virginia: W. L. Callin. OCLC 3886825.
- Callahan, James Morton (1923). History of West Virginia, Old and New, Volume 2. Chicago, Illinois, and New York City, New York: American Historical Society. OCLC 373051.
- Confederate Memorial Association; United Confederate Veterans (1896). The South's Battle Abbey. Atlanta, Georgia: Respress Company. OCLC 028832138.
- Eisenburg, William Edward; Utt, James Howard (2003). This Heritage: The Story of Lutheran Beginnings in the Lower Shenandoah Valley and of Grace Church, Winchester. Lot's Wife Publishing. OCLC 4309489.
- Evans, Clement Anselm (1899). Confederate Military History, Volume 2. Atlanta, Georgia: Confederate Publishing Company. OCLC 951143. Archived from the original on June 26, 2014.
- Kleese, Richard B. (1996). 23rd Virginia Cavalry. Lynchburg, Virginia: H. E. Howard. ISBN 9781561900916. OCLC 34916476. Archived from the original on June 26, 2014.
- Lewis, Ronald L. (1998). Transforming the Appalachian Countryside: Railroads, Deforestation, and Social Change in West Virginia, 1880–1920. Chapel Hill, North Carolina: University of North Carolina Press. ISBN 978-0-8078-6297-1. OCLC 45727827. Archived from the original on April 25, 2016.
- Maxwell, Hu; Swisher, Howard Llewellyn (1897). History of Hampshire County, West Virginia From Its Earliest Settlement to the Present. Morgantown, West Virginia: A. Brown Boughner, Printer. OCLC 680931891. OL 23304577M.
- Munske, Roberta R.; Kerns, Wilmer L., eds. (2004). Hampshire County, West Virginia, 1754–2004. Romney, West Virginia: The Hampshire County 250th Anniversary Committee. ISBN 978-0-9715738-2-6. OCLC 55983178.
- Sprague, William Buell (1869). Annals of the American Pulpit, Or, Commemorative Notices of Distinguished American Clergymen of Various Denominations: From the Early Settlement of the Country to the Close of the Year Eighteen Hundred and Fifty-five: with Historical Introductions, Volume 9. New York City, New York: Robert Carter & Brothers. OCLC 839292. Archived from the original on May 5, 2016.
- United States Fish Commission (1883). Bulletin of the United States Fish Commission, Volume 3. Washington, D.C.: United States Government Printing Office. OCLC 469791271. Archived from the original on January 3, 2014.
- Virkus, Frederick Adams; Marquis, Albert Nelson (1926). The Compendium of American Genealogy: First Families of America; the Standard Genealogical Encyclopedia of the United States, Volume 2. Chicago, Illinois: F. A. Virkus & Company. OCLC 62499518. Archived from the original on April 12, 2017.
- West Virginia Legislature (1871). Acts of the Legislature of West Virginia; At Its Ninth Session, Commencing January 17th, 1871. Charleston, West Virginia: H. S. Walker, Public Printer. Archived from the original on October 31, 2013.
- West Virginia Legislature (1891). Acts of the Legislature of West Virginia at Its Twentieth Regular Session, Commencing January 14, 1891. Charleston, West Virginia: Moses W. Donnally, Public Printer. Archived from the original on June 26, 2014.
- West Virginia Legislature; West Virginia Senate (1916). John T. Harris, Clerk of the West Virginia Senate (ed.). West Virginia Legislative Hand Book and Manual and Official Register, 1916. Charleston, West Virginia: The Tribune Printing Company. OCLC 301330754. Archived from the original on May 29, 2016.
- West Virginia Senate (1878). Journal of the Senate of the State of West Virginia, for the Fifteenth Session, 1879. Wheeling, West Virginia: W. J. Johnston, Public Printer. Archived from the original on June 26, 2014.

Government offices
Preceded by Henry B. Miller	President of the West Virginia Fish Commission; 1885 – ?	Unknown
Court offices
Preceded by James A. Parsons	Clerk of Court for Hampshire County; 1873 – 1902	Succeeded by Charles W. Haines
Preceded by C. M. Taylor	Clerk of the Circuit Court for Hampshire County; 1873 – 1876	Succeeded by V. M. Polling
