= Robert White (Virginia physician) =

Scottish physician and military officer in the Colony of Virginia

- Born: 1688; Scotland
- Died: 1752 (aged 63–64); White Farm, Hayfield, Frederick County, Colony of Virginia
- Burial place: Old Opequon Cemetery; Opequon Presbyterian Church; Kernstown, Virginia, United States
- Spouse: Margaret Hoge
- Relatives: John White (father); Alexander White (son); Robert White (grandson); Francis White (grandson); Robert White (great-great-grandson)
- Military career
- Allegiance: Kingdom of Great Britain
- Branch: Royal Navy
- Service years: early 1700s (Great Britain)
- Rank: Captain
- Other work: Physician, military officer, pioneer, planter

Robert White (1688–1752) was an early American physician, military officer, pioneer, and planter in the Colony of Virginia.

White was born in Scotland, the son of John White, a physician practicing in Paisley, Renfrewshire. He studied medicine at the University of Edinburgh, and later served as a surgeon with the rank of captain in the Royal Navy of the Kingdom of Great Britain. He relocated to the Thirteen Colonies between 1720 and 1730, first to Delaware, then Pennsylvania, and finally as a "pioneer settler" in present-day Frederick County, Virginia between 1732 and 1735. White was one of two physicians practicing in Frederick County, and conducted his practice from his residence near Great North Mountain. White was part of a larger wave of Scottish physicians who settled in Virginia prior to the American Revolutionary War.

White was the progenitor of the White political family of Virginia and West Virginia. He was the father of Alexander White (1738–1804), United States House Representative, and the grandfather of Virginia judge Robert White (1759–1831) and United States House Representative Francis White (1761–1826).

== Early life and education ==
Robert White was born in Scotland in 1688. He was the son of John White, a physician practicing in Paisley, Renfrewshire who died in 1742. White's lineage was of both Scottish and English origins, descending from Covenanters, a Scottish Presbyterian movement during the 17th century. He studied medicine at the University of Edinburgh in Edinburgh, Scotland, and graduated with a Doctor of Medicine degree from the institution.

== Royal Navy service ==
Following the completion of his education, White served as a surgeon with the rank of captain in the Royal Navy of the Kingdom of Great Britain. While it is not known for certain why White resigned his commission, White family tradition held that he left the Royal Navy after he engaged in a duel with another officer.

== Arrival in America ==
White was the first member of his family to travel to and reside in America. Between 1720 and 1730, White arrived in the British Colonies where he visited his uncle William Hoge (an ancestor of United States House of Representatives member John Blair Hoge) residing in Delaware Colony. White fell in love with Hoge's eldest daughter Margaret and he married her in Delaware Colony. White's marriage to Margaret was likely the cause of his resignation from the Royal Navy. He and Margaret, along with her father William Hoge, relocated near York, Pennsylvania where White erected a residence he named "White Hall" after his family's ancestral home in Scotland.

== Settlement in Virginia ==
From York, White relocated between 1732 and 1735 as a "pioneer settler" to a stream along Great North Mountain near Winchester in Orange County, Virginia (later included as part of Frederick County following its 1738 creation), where he established a plantation. During this move to Virginia, White was accompanied by his elderly father-in-law William Hoge, who settled three miles south of Winchester on Opequon Creek. White was one of the earlier pioneer settlers of Frederick County. White and Hoge, along with other families, established the Opequon Meeting House, the oldest Presbyterian congregation formed west of the Blue Ridge Mountains.

White "staked out" his farm between 1732 and 1735 consisting of 375 acres (152 ha) along Hogue Creek, south of the present-day unincorporated community of Hayfield, Virginia along U.S. Route 50. White's land tract was surveyed by John Mauzy on 22 April 1751, and he was issued a formal land grant from Thomas Fairfax, 6th Lord Fairfax of Cameron on 15 November 1754. Mauzy's survey stated that White had been residing on the land tract since at least 1751. White established his permanent residence on this land grant, which became the ancestral home of the White family of Virginia and West Virginia.

White was one of two physicians practicing in Frederick County along with Daniel Hart (died about 1748). White practiced from his residence near Great North Mountain, and one of his more notable patients was Colonel James Wood, founder of Winchester, Virginia. White's son Alexander married Wood's daughter, Elizabeth Wood. White was part a larger wave of Scottish physicians who settled in Virginia prior to the American Revolutionary War. White's alma mater, the University of Edinburgh, was a leading center of medical education and research, and the school trained more physicians than were needed in Scotland. Unlike White, the majority of Scottish physicians practiced in the main centers of population in the colonial port cities.

== Later life and death ==
White died in 1752 at the age of 64 and was interred in the eastern corner of the Old Opequon Cemetery at the Opequon Presbyterian Church in Kernstown, 3 miles (4.8 km) south of Winchester. By 1855, a tree was located at White's burial site in the eastern corner of the cemetery, and the same tree remained at his burial site in 1891. White was survived by his three sons, Robert, Alexander, and John, and his wife. His son, Dr. Robert White Jr., inherited the White family farm following White's death.

== Marriage and children ==
White married Margaret Hoge, the eldest daughter of his uncle William Hoge and his wife, Barbara Hume. White and his wife, Margaret, had at least eight children together:

Name	Birth date	Death date	Spouse
John White	about 1721		Ann Patton
Barbara White Julian			Isaac Julian, married on 10 September 1741 in Frederick County
Hannah White Dunlevy			Andrew (or Anthony) Dunlevy, married around 1746
Margaret White McMillan			James McMillan
Christina White Morgan	circa 1726		Lewis Morgan
Eleanor "Helena" White Ruble	3 July 1732	11 March 1800	Owen Ruble, son of Ulrich and Jane Ruble
Dr. Robert White Jr.	9 March 1734	5 August 1815	Elizabeth (maiden name unknown)
Alexander White	1738	19 September 1804	Elizabeth Wood; Sarah Cotter Hite, married on 10 June 1784

== Bibliography ==
- Atkinson, George Wesley (1919). Bench and Bar of West Virginia. Charleston, West Virginia: Virginia Law Book Company. OCLC 8899470.
- Blanton, Wyndham Bolling (1980). Medicine in Virginia in the Eighteenth Century. New York City: Ams Press Inc. ISBN 978-0-404-13238-5. OCLC 6143818. Archived from the original on 28 June 2014.
- Bruce, Philip Alexander; Stanard, William Glover (1915). The Virginia Magazine of History and Biography, Volume 23. Richmond, Virginia: Virginia Historical Society. Archived from the original on 4 July 2014.
- Cartmell, Thomas Kemp (1909). Shenandoah Valley Pioneers and Their Descendants: A History of Frederick County, Virginia (illustrated) from Its Formation in 1738 to 1908. Winchester, Virginia: The Eddy Press Corporation. ISBN 978-1-55613-243-8. OCLC 779080923. Archived from the original on 28 June 2014.
- Dobson, David (2004). Scottish Emigration to Colonial America, 1607–1785. Athens, Georgia: University of Georgia Press. ISBN 978-0-8203-2643-6. OCLC 724457237. Archived from the original on 22 May 2016.
- Ebert, Rebecca A.; Lazazzera, Teresa (1988). Frederick County, Virginia: From the Frontier to the Future: A Pictorial History. Virginia Beach, Virginia: The Donning Company. ISBN 978-0-89865-725-8. OCLC 18163977. Archived from the original on 28 June 2014.
- Fletcher, Helen Lee; Gordon, C. Langdon (30 August 2000). "National Register of Historic Places Registration Form: Opequon Presbyterian Church" (PDF). Virginia Department of Historic Resources, Historic Registers: Frederick County (Northern Region). Virginia Department of Historic Resources. Archived (PDF) from the original on 26 September 2012.
- Foote, William Henry (1855). Sketches of Virginia, Historical and Biographical, Second Series. Philadelphia: J. B. Lippincott and Company.
- Grigsby, Hugh Blair; Brock, Robert Alonzo (1891). The History of the Virginia Federal Convention of 1788, With Some Account of the Eminent Virginians of That Era Who Were Members of the Body. Richmond, Virginia: Virginia Historical Society. OCLC 60721004. Archived from the original on 3 December 2013.
- Kelly, Gwendolyn Dunlevy (1901). A Genealogical History of the Dunlevy Family. Columbus, Ohio: Gwendolyn Dunlevy Kelly. ISBN 9780608320533. OCLC 6989942. Archived from the original on 28 June 2014.
- Kerns, Wilmer L. (1995). Frederick County, Virginia: Settlement and Some First Families of Back Creek Valley, 1730–1830. Baltimore: Gateway Press, Incorporated. OCLC 32652014. Archived from the original on 27 June 2014.
- Maltby, Martha Humphreys; White, Emma Siggins (1920). Genesis of the White Family. Kansas City, Missouri: Tiernan-Dart Printing Company. OCLC 5926942.
- Maxwell, Hu; Swisher, Howard Llewellyn (1897). History of Hampshire County, West Virginia From Its Earliest Settlement to the Present. Morgantown, West Virginia: A. Brown Boughner, Printer. OCLC 680931891. OL 23304577M.
- Morton, Frederic (1925). The Story of Winchester in Virginia: The Oldest Town in the Shenandoah Valley. Westminster, Maryland: Heritage Books. ISBN 978-0-7884-1770-2. Archived from the original on 4 January 2014.
- Munske, Roberta R.; Kerns, Wilmer L., eds. (2004). Hampshire County, West Virginia, 1754–2004. Romney, West Virginia: The Hampshire County 250th Anniversary Committee. ISBN 978-0-9715738-2-6. OCLC 55983178.
- Norris, J. E. (1972). History of the Lower Shenandoah Valley: Counties of Frederick, Berkeley, Jefferson, and Clarke; Their Early Settlement and Progress to the Present Time; Geological Features; a Description of Their Historic and Interesting Localities; Cities, Towns, and Villages; Portraits of Some of the Prominent Men, and Biographies of Many of the Representative Citizens. Berryville, Virginia: Virginia Book Company. OCLC 614402. Archived from the original on 4 July 2014.
- O'Dell, Cecil (2007). Pioneers of Old Frederick County Virginia. Westminster, Maryland: Heritage Books. ISBN 978-0-7884-4483-8. OCLC 166379755.
- Quarles, Garland Redd (1971). Some Old Homes in Frederick County, Virginia. Winchester-Frederick County Historical Society. ISBN 9780923198039. OCLC 1584726. Archived from the original on 4 January 2014.
- Shawkey, Morris Purdy (1928). West Virginia: In History, Life, Literature and Industry, Volume 3. Lewis Publishing Company. Archived from the original on 4 July 2014.
