= Alexander White (Virginia politician) =

American politician, lawyer (1738-1804)

6th Commissioner of the Federal City
- In office May 21, 1795 – July 1, 1802
- Preceded by: Daniel Carroll
- Succeeded by: Office Abolished

Member of the Virginia House of Delegates from Berkeley County
- In office 1799–1801 Serving with Magnus Tate, James Stephenson

Member of the U.S. House of Representatives from 's 1st district
- In office March 4, 1789 – March 3, 1793
- Preceded by: Position established
- Succeeded by: Robert Rutherford

Member of the Virginia House of Delegates from Frederick County
- In office 1788–1788 Serving with John S. Woodcock
- In office 1782–1785 Serving with Charles Thruston, General James Wood

Member of the House of Burgesses from Hampshire County
- In office 1772–1773 Serving with James Mercer
- Preceded by: Abraham Hite
- Succeeded by: Joseph Neville

Personal details
- Born: June 17, 1738 White Hall, Virginia Colony, British America
- Died: October 9, 1804 (aged 65–66) Frederick County, Virginia, U.S.
- Resting place: Glen Burnie, Winchester, Virginia
- Party: Pro-Administration Party
- Spouse(s): Elizabeth Wood; Sarah Cotter Hite
- Relations: Robert White (father); Margaret Hoge (mother); Robert White (nephew); Francis White (nephew); Robert White (great-great-nephew); James Wood (brother-in-law)
- Education: University of Edinburgh; Inner Temple; Gray's Inn
- Occupation: Lawyer, politician

Alexander White (June 17, 1738 – October 9, 1804) was an early American lawyer and politician in Virginia. He served in the House of Burgesses (representing Hampshire County), the Virginia House of Delegates (representing Frederick County and later Berkeley County. During the American Revolutionary War, White facilitated the release of Quaker and Hessian civilian prisoners held by patriots. White also participated in the Virginia Ratifying Convention (in which Virginia ratified the United States Constitution in 1788) and became the northwestern Virginia district's inaugural member in the United States House of Representatives (1789 to 1793). United States President George Washington appointed White one of the commissioners responsible for the planning and construction of Washington, D.C. (1795 to 1802).

The son of Virginia pioneer settler and physician Dr. Robert White (1688–1752); White was a member of the prominent White political family of Virginia and West Virginia. His nephew became Virginia judge Robert White (1759–1831), another nephew became United States Congressman Francis White (1761–1826), and his brother-in-law was Virginia Governor James Wood (1741–1813).

== Early life and education ==
Alexander White was born in 1738 to Dr. Robert White (1688–1752) and his wife, Margaret Hoge, at "White Hall" in the Colony of Virginia, near present-day Hayfield then in vast Orange County (later part of Frederick County, which was created later that year). White's father, Dr. Robert White, had served as a surgeon in the Royal Navy of the Kingdom of Great Britain. Between 1732 and 1735, Dr. White became a "pioneer settler" and one of two practicing physicians in what became Frederick County. Through his father, White was of Scottish descent and raised in the Presbyterian faith.

Dr. White sent his son to Scotland, where he studied jurisprudence at the University of Edinburgh. White continued his law studies in London, England, where he was admitted to the Inner Temple on January 15, 1762, and matriculated at Gray's Inn on January 22, 1763. White remained in Britain and completed his law studies during what Virginians called the French and Indian War.

== Lawyer and politician ==
White returned to Virginia in 1765, where he was admitted to the bar, began practicing law and became a prominent lawyer in the Shenandoah Valley region with a "national reputation". White became deputy King's attorney for Frederick County in 1772.

=== House of Burgesses ===
Hampshire County voters elected as one of their two (part-time) representatives to the House of Burgesses in Williamsburg in 1772, but he only served a year of what became a two-year term, resigning in 1773 in order to accept a position as deputy king's attorney, and replaced by Joseph Neville. James Mercer was Hampshire County's other representative; although he lived near Fredericksburg, his family owned land in Hampshire County. White also served with Patrick Henry; Henry reportedly never cast his vote without first consulting with White. White was an eloquent public speaker, and due to his Scottish Presbyterian background, he strongly opposed the colonial government's support for the Church of England in Virginia. Therefore, White presented a resolution before the House of Burgesses regarding the separation of church and state. According to historians Hu Maxwell and Howard Llewellyn Swisher, White is the first man in what is now the United States to present a resolution to a legislature regarding the freedom of religion.

When the first court of Berkeley County convened on May 19, 1772, the judges appointed White as the King's attorney for the county. White resigned from the House of Burgesses upon being appointed the deputy King's attorney for the Colony of Virginia in 1773.

=== American Revolutionary War ===
While White did not engage in military service during the American Revolutionary War, he remained active in the practice of law in Winchester throughout the war's duration. According to tradition, White facilitated the release of Quaker and Hessian civilian prisoners held by American Revolutionary patriots in a building in the southern part of Winchester. The Quakers and Hessians were imprisoned under the suspicion of their perceived support of British forces. The prisoners asked White to assist them with their release, and paid him 100 Virginia pounds. Following the British retreat from the Philadelphia campaign, White traveled to Philadelphia to negotiate with the "executive authority" concerning the prisoners' release to Pennsylvania, where public sentiment demanded their return. White successfully secured their release upon the condition that they affirm that "they would henceforth live by their creed and be at peace with all men."

=== Virginia House of Delegates ===
From 1782 to 1786, White was elected annually and served in the Virginia House of Delegates, representing Frederick County (Winchester being the county seat) alongside Charles Mynn Thruston (three times, although White only arrived a month after the Virginia General Assembly began its first legislative session), and alongside James Wood in the 1784–1785 term. White served another term in the Virginia House of Delegates in 1788 alongside John Shearman Woodcock.

In 1788, White and Woodcock also participated in the Virginia Ratifying Convention, in which Virginia ratified the United States Constitution. White is believed to have used the pseudonym "An Independent Freeholder" to author a series of essays written in support of the Constitution's ratification. The essays were published in the January 18 and 25, 1788, issues of the Winchester Virginia Gazette newspaper. After his congressional service, White served two additional terms in the Virginia House of Delegates from 1799 to 1801, again representing Berkeley County, where he owned a significant amount of land.

=== United States House of Representatives ===
White served two terms as the inaugural member to represent Virginia's 1st congressional district in the United States House of Representatives during the 1st United States Congress and the 2nd United States Congress (March 4, 1789 – March 3, 1793). White was the first person residing in what later became West Virginia to occupy a seat in the United States Congress. During his tenure, White's congressional district spanned from Harpers Ferry to the Ohio River. As he was previously known in the House of Burgesses, White was reportedly one of the more eloquently spoken members in the first Congress and also known for his "remarkable punctuality".

White voted in favor of the Residence Act, the United States federal law that settled the question of locating the capital of the United States along the Potomac River in Maryland and Virginia. Three days after the Residence Act became law, the United States House of Representatives agreed upon the Funding Act as part of the Compromise of 1790, to address the issue of funding domestic debt. On August 9, 1790, the Funding Act became law. White voted in support of the Funding Act; however, according to Thomas Jefferson, White's vote was the result of an argument that occurred at a dinner hosted by Jefferson, after which White and Richard Bland Lee changed their votes in favor of the Funding Act. Jefferson stated that White reluctantly supported the bill "with a revulsion of stomach almost convulsive". The votes of both White and Lee carried the Funding Act measure, making the enactment of the Residence Act possible.

White was re-elected to his seat in 1791 after defeating his opponents, William Darke and General James Wood. According to GovTrack, from May 1789 to March 1793, White missed 26 of 211 recorded votes (or 12.3%). White's voting participation was higher than the median of 14.6% among the lifetime records of representatives serving in March 1793. Following the adjournment of the 2nd United States Congress, and the completion of his term in 1793, White retired from public life and went to his estate, "Woodville", in Frederick County near Winchester.

=== City of Washington Board of Commissioners ===
On May 18, 1795, White was appointed by United States President George Washington to serve as one of the three commissioners responsible for supervising the raising of funds, planning, design, and acquisition of property and the erection of public buildings in the city of Washington and the federal district. White had been selected to replace Daniel Carroll on the board following Carroll's resignation. While on the board, White was paid a salary of $1,600 per year for his services; White continued to serve on the board until May 1, 1802, when it was abolished. He concurrently served as one of the directors of the Potomac Company, which made improvements to the Potomac River and improved its navigability for commerce.

== Personal life and family ==
In 1796, White married Elizabeth Wood (September 20, 1739 – October 24, 1782), the daughter of Colonel James Wood, founder of Winchester, Virginia, and his wife, Mary Rutherford Wood. Colonel Wood was also the father of James Wood, an officer in the Continental Army during the American Revolutionary War and the 11th governor of Virginia. Following the death of his wife, Elizabeth, White remarried on June 10, 1784, in present-day Berkeley County, to Sarah Cotter Hite, the widow of John Hite.

== Land ownership ==
On either June 2 or November 5, 1773, White purchased the 260 acres (1.1 km^{2}) estate of Henry Heth, who had foreclosed on his mortgage agreement with William McMachen. McMachen sold the property to White for 500 pounds following his relocation to Hampshire County. White renamed the property "Woodville", presumably after his wife Elizabeth's family, and it remained his primary residence until his death in 1804. "Woodville" is presently located 1.5 miles (2.4 km) northwest of Winchester's Sunnyside neighborhood and approximately 1 mile (1.6 km) northeast of Apple Pie Ridge Road (Virginia Secondary Route 739).

White owned "valuable lands" in Hampshire County, which enabled him to represent that county while serving as a member of the House of Burgesses. On June 12, 1769, White and Angus McDonald purchased 297 acres (1.20 km^{2}) on the Little Cacapon and North rivers, and another 425 acres (1.72 km^{2}) on the Little Cacapon River in Hampshire County. White also owned a significant amount of land in Berkeley County, which he represented in the Virginia House of Delegates.

== Later life ==
White continued to practice law throughout his political career. In October 1776, White was named a trustee for the town of Bath, after its conveyance from Thomas Fairfax, 6th Lord Fairfax of Cameron. In October 1786, White was also appointed a trustee for Charles Town.

== Death and legacy ==
White died on October 9, 1804, at his "Woodville" estate in Frederick County, Virginia. He died without children, thus leaving no descendants. White was interred at the Wood family's "Glen Burnie" estate in Winchester, Virginia.

His will was drafted on May 26, 1804, and proved on December 3, 1804, following his death. In his will, White left the bulk of his property and assets to his nephews and nieces. Although in his lifetime, White had opposed the "Quaker memorial relating to slavery", and owned six enslaved adults and 7 enslaved children in 1787, the will also manumitted his slaves. White left his "Woodville" estate to his nephew, Judge Robert White.

In his book, The History of the Virginia Federal Convention of 1788 (1891), Virginia historian Hugh Blair Grigsby remarked of White, "Perhaps no member of the able and patriotic delegation which the West contributed to our early councils exerted a greater influence in moulding public opinion, especially during the period embraced by the treaty of peace with Great Britain and by the adoption of the Federal Constitution, than Alexander White, of Frederick."

White had a Liberty ship named for him in 1942 during World War II. The SS Alexander White, MC hull 139, was laid down on October 11, 1942, and launched on December 7, 1942. It was scrapped in 1964.

== Bibliography ==
- Blanton, Wyndham Bolling (1980). Medicine in Virginia in the Eighteenth Century. Ams Press Inc. ISBN 978-0-404-13238-5. Archived from the original on June 28, 2014.
- Bordewich, Fergus (2009). Washington: The Making of the American Capital. New York City, New York: HarperCollins. ISBN 978-0-06-175554-5. Archived from the original on October 18, 2017.
- Bruce, Philip Alexander; Stanard, William Glover (1968). The Virginia Magazine of History and Biography, Volume 23. Richmond, Virginia: Virginia Historical Society. Archived from the original on July 4, 2014.
- Bryan, Wilhelmus Bogart (1914). A History of the National Capital from Its Foundation Through the Period of the Adoption of the Organic Act, Volume 1. New York City, New York: The Macmillan Company. Archived from the original on June 28, 2014.
- Bunker, John (1972). Liberty Ships: The Ugly Ducklings of World War II. Annapolis, Maryland: United States Naval Institute Press. ISBN 9780870213403. Archived from the original on June 28, 2014.
- Cartmell, Thomas Kemp (1909). Shenandoah Valley Pioneers and Their Descendants: A History of Frederick County, Virginia (illustrated) from Its Formation in 1738 to 1908. Winchester, Virginia: The Eddy Press Corporation. OCLC 8044287. Archived from the original on June 28, 2014.
- Grigsby, Hugh Blair (1891). The History of the Virginia Federal Convention of 1788, With Some Account of the Eminent Virginians of That Era Who Were Members of the Body. Richmond, Virginia: Virginia Historical Society. Archived from the original on December 3, 2013.
- Jensen, Merrill; DenBoer, Gordon Roy; Becker, Robert A. (1984). Documentary History of the First Federal Elections, 1788–1790, Volume 2. Madison, Wisconsin: University of Wisconsin Press. ISBN 978-0-299-09510-9. Archived from the original on December 18, 2017.
- Kangas, M. N.; Payne, D. E. (1983). Frederick County, Virginia: Wills & Administrations, 1795–1816. Genealogical Publishing Company. ISBN 978-0-8063-1022-0. Archived from the original on January 4, 2014.
- Kelley, Gwendolyn Dunlevy (1901). A Genealogical History of the Dunlevy Family. Columbus, Ohio: Gwendolyn Dunlevy Kelley. OCLC 608672768. Archived from the original on June 28, 2014.
- Kercheval, Samuel (1833). A History of the Valley of Virginia. Winchester, Virginia: Samuel H. Davis.
- Kerns, Wilmer L. (1995). Frederick County, Virginia: Settlement and Some First Families of Back Creek Valley, 1730–1830. Gateway Press, Incorporated. Archived from the original on June 27, 2014.
- Lewis, Virgil Anson (1906). First Biennial Report of the Department of Archives and History of the State of West Virginia, Volume 1. West Virginia Department of Archives and History. Charleston, West Virginia: The Tribune Printing Company. Archived from the original on January 4, 2014.
- Maxwell, Hu; Swisher, Howard Llewellyn (1897). History of Hampshire County, West Virginia From Its Earliest Settlement to the Present. Morgantown, West Virginia: A. Brown Boughner, Printer. OCLC 680931891. OL 23304577M.
- Morton, Frederic (1925). The Story of Winchester in Virginia: The Oldest Town in the Shenandoah Valley. Westminster, Maryland: Heritage Books. OCLC 47054469. Archived from the original on January 4, 2014.
- Munske, Roberta R.; Kerns, Wilmer L., eds. (2004). Hampshire County, West Virginia, 1754–2004. Romney, West Virginia: The Hampshire County 250th Anniversary Committee. ISBN 978-0-9715738-2-6. OCLC 55983178.
- O'Dell, Cecil (2007). Pioneers of Old Frederick County Virginia. Westminster, Maryland: Heritage Books. ISBN 978-0-7884-4483-8.
- Quarles, Garland Redd (1971). Some Old Homes in Frederick County, Virginia. Winchester-Frederick County Historical Society. ISBN 9780923198039. Archived from the original on January 4, 2014.
- Sage, Clara McCormack; Jones, Laura Elizabeth Sage (1939). Early Records, Hampshire County, Virginia: Now West Virginia, Including at the Start Most of Known Va. Aside from Augusta District. Genealogical Publishing Company. OCLC 45233846. Archived from the original on January 4, 2014.
- Tindall, William (1914). Standard History of the City of Washington from a Study of the Original Sources. H. W. Crew & Company.

U.S. House of Representatives
Preceded by Position established	Member of the U.S. House of Representatives from Virginia's 1st congressional district 1789 – 1793	Succeeded by Robert Rutherford
Virginia House of Delegates
Preceded by Abraham Hite	Member of the House of Burgesses from Hampshire County; 1772–1773; Served alongside: James Mercer	Succeeded by Joseph Neville
