= Robert White (judge) =

American military officer and judge

Honorable Robert White
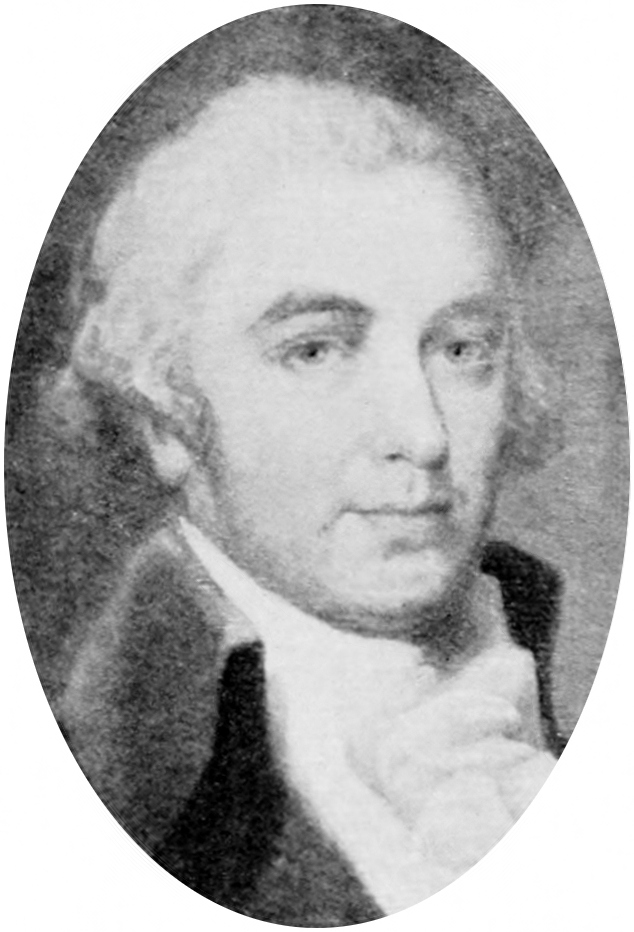
- Portrait of Judge Robert White

Member of the Virginia House of Delegates from the Frederick County district
- In office 1789–1793 Serving with Matthew Page

Judge of the Virginia General Court
- In office November 16, 1793 – March 1831

Judge of the 10th Judicial District of Virginia
- In office Unknown–1825
- Preceded by: None
- Succeeded by: William Brockinbough; John Scott

Personal details
- Born: March 29, 1759 Winchester, Colony of Virginia
- Died: March 9, 1831 (aged 71) Winchester, Virginia, United States
- Resting place: Burial: Old Presbyterian Cemetery, Winchester, Virginia, United States; Reburial: Mount Hebron Cemetery, Winchester, Virginia, United States
- Spouse: Arabella Baker
- Relations: John White (father); Ann Patton White (mother); Robert White (grandfather); Alexander White (uncle); Francis White (brother); Robert White (grandson); Christian Streit White (grandson)
- Children: Robert Baker White; Juliet Ann White Opie; John Baker White
- Profession: military officer, lawyer, judge, and politician

Military service
- Allegiance: United States
- Branch/service: Virginia militia Continental Army
- Years of service: 1775–1779
- Rank: Captain
- Unit: Captain Hugh Stephenson's regiment (1775); Major William Darke's regiment
- Battles/wars: American Revolutionary War * Boston campaign (1775–1776) * Battle of Germantown (1777)

Robert White (March 29, 1759 – March 9, 1831) was a distinguished early American military officer, lawyer, judge, and politician in the U.S. state of Virginia.

White represented Frederick County in the Virginia House of Delegates (1789–1792) and served as a judge of the General Court of Virginia (1793–1831). Prior to his political and law careers, White served in the Virginia militia and Continental Army during the American Revolutionary War.

White was the grandson of Virginia pioneer settler and physician Dr. Robert White (1688–1752) and thus a member of the prominent White political family of Virginia and West Virginia. He was the nephew of United States House Representative Alexander White (1738–1804) and the brother of United States House Representative Francis White (1761–1826).

== Early life and education ==
Robert White was born on March 29, 1759, in Winchester, Virginia. He was a son of John White, one of the justices serving on the first Bench of Magistrates of the Frederick County court, and his wife, Ann Patton White. White was also a grandson of Dr. Robert White, an early physician and pioneer settler of Frederick County. White received his primary education at a grammar school near Marsh Creek in Pennsylvania under the direction of Reverend Craighead, a Presbyterian minister. At the age of 16, White undertook a hiatus from his education to serve in the American Revolutionary War.

== Military career ==
In 1775, White enlisted as a private in the Virginia militia company under the command of Captain Hugh Stephenson (or Stevenson), which had been organized in Berkeley County, Virginia (present-day Jefferson County, West Virginia). Stephenson's company departed for the Boston campaign "a few days" before Daniel Morgan's company departed from Winchester. White, along with Stephenson's company, departed on June 20, 1775, from Morgan's Spring near Shepherdstown and marched to Boston to reinforce commander-in-chief of the Continental Army George Washington's forces who had besieged the British Army forces there.

While in Boston, White's "chivalric bearing" received the attention of Washington, who "saw in the boy the germ of that remarkable decision of character". On March 17, 1776, British forces withdrew from Boston, thus ending the Boston campaign. In the summer of 1776, White was elevated to the rank of ensign. White then fought as a lieutenant at the Battle of Germantown on October 4, 1777, under Major William Darke of Berkeley County. Throughout the spring of 1778, White was engaged in attacking British Army detachments.

Later in 1778 at Short Hills, New Jersey, White suffered a fractured femur caused by a musket ball and received a wound to the head from the stock of a British Army grenadier's musket. Following the engagement at Short Hills, White was taken as a prisoner of war by the British forces. White had fallen unconscious and was taken to the tent of "an amiable and accomplished" British officer who had rescued him from death. He was later exchanged, and in the autumn of 1778 White returned to Winchester "by slow and painful efforts, exceedingly lame, weak and emaciated by acute and protracted suffering". His wounds had not yet healed by the time of his return to Winchester, but following the removal of bone fragments, the wound began to close. White remained permanently physically disabled as a result of his injuries.

While "not fully recovered from his wounds", White received the commission of a captain of cavalry in 1779. He commenced the recruitment and training of American troops in Philadelphia to fight in the war, but due to the severity of his injuries, he retired from military service at the age of 20 and returned to Winchester. White was inducted as an original member of the Society of the Cincinnati for his military service during the war.

== Law and political careers ==
Following his military service and return to Winchester in 1779, White studied jurisprudence under his uncle, Alexander White, one of the most prominent lawyers practicing in the Shenandoah Valley. During the course of his four years of law studies, White read the legal treatises of William Blackstone and Edward Coke among others while lying on his back or propped up on a couch recovering from his injuries. White was admitted to practice law at Winchester in December 1782, after which he engaged in the practice of law for eleven years.

White's health continued to improve, and his law practice was "an extensive and profitable" one. In a May 1837 biographical sketch of White published in the Southern Literary Messenger, White was described as "an able lawyer, clear and cogent in argument, but not eloquent, his voice rather harsh and shrill, and in the impetuosity of debate his enunciation was sometimes affected even to stammering". White maintained a "lofty eminence" within the Frederick County bar for over a decade. During this time, White served as a member of the Virginia House of Delegates from 1789 to 1793 representing the multi-member district of Frederick County. White ran for election against Matthew Page and Joseph Holmes for the seat in 1791, and won alongside Page with 310 votes to Page's 335 votes. White ran for election to his seat in 1793 against Page, Thomas Buck, and James Singleton. White received the largest total of votes with a result of 388.

== Judicial career and later life ==
White was appointed as the first judge serving Virginia's tenth judicial district, which was composed of five counties, including Hampshire County. Winchester was chosen by an act of the Virginia General Assembly as the "center point" of this judicial district, where all judicial records were kept. His appointment as a judge of the tenth judicial district paid a meager compensation of 1,600 dollars per annum.

White was then appointed a judge of the General Court of Virginia on November 16, 1793, and he continued to hold that office until his death in 1831. In that period, White served as the president of the General Court of Virginia for several years before his death. Serving on the General Court of Virginia required White to travel to Richmond in June and November of each year. Until 1825, White served as both a judge on the General Court of Virginia and a judge of Virginia's tenth judicial district.

During the War of 1812, White took a dislike to the "encroachment of military power" as Winchester began to attract a sizable number of recruits going off to fight in the war. White refused to permit military officers to appear before him in his courtroom with their swords by their sides. Several of White's judicial opinions became well known as "powerful specimens of sound learning and extensive research" including the Hyers case, in which the defendant was tried for murder, and the Preston case, in which there was a legal question regarding estoppel. From his office, White conducted the teaching of jurisprudence to John Buchanan, a notable Maryland jurist who later served in the Maryland House of Delegates and as an associate justice of the Maryland Court of Appeals.

In the spring of 1825, White was en route to serve on the court of Loudoun County and stayed the night at a tavern along the Shenandoah River. He was discovered by the proprietor the following morning suffering with paralysis. White remained stricken with paralysis for several weeks and returned to his home in Winchester on a litter. His position as judge of the tenth judicial district was assumed by two judges: William Brockinbough and John Scott. White remained paralyzed for the remainder of his life. On July 1, 1825, White gave power of attorney to his son, John Baker White, for the management of his affairs. White later died at his residence in Winchester on March 9, 1831.

== Personal life and family ==
White married Arabella Baker, the daughter of John Baker, Sr. and his wife, Judith Wood Baker (born February 15, 1761), of Shepherdstown, Virginia (now West Virginia). Her brother John Baker was a United States Congressman.

White and his wife had three children together:

Name	Birth date	Death date	Spouse
Robert Baker White	March 17, 1785	July 6, 1826	Elizabeth Kean
Juliet Ann White Opie		August 4, 1839	Mr. Opie
John Baker White	August 4, 1794	October 9, 1862	Alcinda Louisa Tapscott, married on December 15, 1815; Frances Ann Streit

White and his family resided in Winchester on Washington Street south of Cecil Street "for many years" until White's death in 1831. White's house, one of the "earliest built brick houses" in Winchester, was destroyed by fire, after which George H. Byrd built a residence on the same site. Byrd deeded the property to his brother, Colonel William Byrd; henceforth that house has been known as the "Byrd House".

== Legacy ==
In the 1970s, three restored portraits painted in 1799 of White, his wife Arabella Baker White, and their son Robert Baker White and daughter Juliet White Opie, were donated to the Historical Society of Winchester by Baker Hall of Huntington, West Virginia, and Louisa Tabb Hall of Charles Town, West Virginia. All three portraits were painted by renowned painter Charles Peale Polk, a nephew of the well-known painter Charles Willson Peale.

== Bibliography ==
- Atkinson, George Wesley (1919). Bench and Bar of West Virginia. Charleston, West Virginia: Virginian Law Book Company.
- Brannon, Selden W., ed. (1976). Historic Hampshire: A Symposium of Hampshire County and Its People, Past and Present. Parsons, West Virginia: McClain Printing Company. ISBN 978-0-87012-236-1. OCLC 3121468.
- Cartmell, T. K. (1908). Shenandoah Valley Pioneers and Their Descendants. Genealogical Publishing Company. ISBN 978-0-8063-4543-7. Archived from the original on November 4, 2013.
- Frymire, Jacob; Simmons, Linda Crocker (1975). Jacob Frymire: American Limner. Corcoran Gallery of Art. Archived from the original on October 29, 2013.
- Kelly, Gwendolyn Dunlevy (1901). A Genealogical History of the Dunlevy Family. Columbus, Ohio: Gwendolyn Dunlevy Kelly. ISBN 9780608320533. Archived from the original on June 28, 2014.
- Kerns, Wilmer L. (1995). Frederick County, Virginia: Settlement and Some First Families of Back Creek Valley, 1730–1830. Gateway Press, Incorporated. Archived from the original on June 27, 2014.
- Lee, Jenny; Du Pont Lee, Marguerite (1966). Virginia Ghosts. Genealogical Publishing Company. ISBN 978-0-8063-5095-0. Archived from the original on June 27, 2014.
- Maxwell, Hu; Swisher, Howard Llewellyn (1897). History of Hampshire County, West Virginia From Its Earliest Settlement to the Present. Morgantown, West Virginia: A. Brown Boughner, Printer. OCLC 680931891. OL 23304577M.
- Morton, Frederic (1925). The Story of Winchester in Virginia: The Oldest Town in the Shenandoah Valley. Westminster, Maryland: Heritage Books. ISBN 978-0-7884-1770-2. Archived from the original on January 4, 2014.
- Munske, Roberta R.; Kerns, Wilmer L., eds. (2004). Hampshire County, West Virginia, 1754–2004. Romney, West Virginia: The Hampshire County 250th Anniversary Committee. ISBN 978-0-9715738-2-6. OCLC 55983178.
- Onofrio, Jan (1999). Maryland Biographical Dictionary. North American Book Dist LLC. ISBN 978-0-403-09823-1. Archived from the original on June 28, 2014.
- Southern Literary Messenger (1838). Southern Literary Messenger, Volume 4. T. W. White. Archived from the original on November 1, 2013.
