= Francis White (Virginia politician) =

American politician (1761–1826)

Honorable Francis White

Member of the U.S. House of Representatives from Virginia's 2nd district
- In office March 4, 1813 – March 3, 1815
- Preceded by: John Baker
- Succeeded by: Magnus Tate

Member of the Virginia House of Delegates from Hampshire County
- In office 1794 Serving with Isaac Parsons
- Preceded by: Elias Poston
- Succeeded by: Elias Poston
- In office 1809–1813 Serving with Alexander King
- Preceded by: William Donaldson; John Higgins
- Succeeded by: George Sharfe; Frederick Sheetz
- In office 1818–1823 Serving with William Armstrong, Jr. Ephraim Dunn; Edward McCarty
- Preceded by: Edward McCarty; William Naylor
- Succeeded by: Christopher Heiskell; Alexander King

Member of the Virginia Senate from Berkeley, Hampshire, Hardy, and Morgan Counties
- In office 1823–1824
- Succeeded by: Elisha Boyd

Sheriff of Hampshire County
- In office December 9, 1823 – October 6, 1826
- Preceded by: E. M. McCarty
- Succeeded by: Isaac Kuykendall

Personal details
- Born: 1761 Hayfield, Virginia Colony, British America
- Died: October 6, 1826 (aged 64–65) Hampshire County, Virginia, U.S.
- Resting place: White Family Graveyard, Hayfield, Virginia
- Party: Federalist Party
- Spouse: Margaret White
- Relations: John White (father); Ann Patton White (mother); Robert White (grandfather); Alexander White (uncle); Robert White (brother); John Baker White (nephew); Robert White (great-nephew); Christian Streit White (great-nephew)
- Children: Thomas B. White; John A. White; Francis White, Jr.
- Occupation: Lawyer, politician

Francis White (1761 – October 6, 1826) was a distinguished early American lawyer and politician in what was then the U.S. state of Virginia (now West Virginia).

White served as a member of the Virginia House of Delegates, representing Hampshire County, and later served as a member of the Virginia State Senate, representing Berkeley, Hampshire, Hardy, and Morgan counties. He represented Virginia's 2nd congressional district in the United States House of Representatives during the 13th United States Congress. White also served as the sheriff of Hampshire County.

White was the grandson of Virginia pioneer settler and physician Dr. Robert White (1688–1752); thus, he was a member of the prominent White political family of Virginia and West Virginia. He was the nephew of United States House Representative Alexander White (1738–1804), and the brother of Virginia judge Robert White (1759–1831).

== Early life ==
Francis White was born in 1761 at Hayfield, near Winchester in Frederick County in the Colony of Virginia. White was the son of John White and his wife, Ann Patton White. Through his grandfather, Dr. Robert White (1688–1752), Francis White was of Scottish descent. His uncle was Alexander White (1738–1804), an inaugural member of the United States House of Representatives.

White attended the common schools in Winchester. Following his education, White engaged in agricultural pursuits along the Cacapon and North rivers in Hampshire County, Virginia (now West Virginia). By 1813, White was operating a gristmill and a sawmill on his Hampshire County property.

== Political career ==
=== Virginia House of Delegates ===
White was elected to represent the multi-member electoral district of Hampshire County in the Virginia House of Delegates for three terms: 1794, 1809 to 1813, and 1818 to 1823. In his 1794 term, White served alongside Isaac Parsons; from 1809 to 1813, he served alongside Alexander King, from 1818 to 1823, White served alongside William Armstrong, Jr., Ephraim Dunn, and Edward McCarty.

During the 1809 election for Hampshire County's two seats in the Virginia House of Delegates, White ran against fellow Federalist Alexander King, and Democratic-Republicans William Donaldson and Jonathan Pugh. King received the most votes at 312, and White came in second with 288 votes, thus qualifying him for a seat. White ran for reelection in 1811 against Alexander King, William Armstrong, and Jonathan Pugh. White and King received the two highest vote totals, with White receiving 313 votes. White was reelected to his seat in 1812, with 336 votes.

Following his election along with Ephraim Dunn in 1821, White returned to the Virginia House of Delegates, representing Hampshire County. In the 1822 election, White ran for election against Ephraim Dunn and George Park, with Dunn and White winning Hampshire County's two seats in the Virginia House of Delegates. White received the most votes, with 276.

In 1795, while serving in the Virginia House of Delegates, White was either elected or appointed to serve as a justice of the peace in Hampshire County, along with Alexander King, William Vause, John Jack, Virgil McCrackin, and John Snyder.

=== United States House of Representatives ===
White was elected unopposed as a Federalist representing Virginia's 2nd congressional district in the United States House of Representatives during the 13th United States Congress (March 4, 1813 – March 3, 1815). White's election in 1813 occurred during an ascendancy of the Federalist Party throughout Virginia.

White served on the United States House Committee on the District of Columbia. According to GovTrack, from May 1813 to March 1815, White missed 56 of 352 roll call votes (15.9%). White resided at the Law's Ten Buildings boarding house of Mrs. Lane on New Jersey Avenue in Washington, D.C. during the May 24 – August 2, 1813 session and the December 6, 1813 – April 18, 1814 session.

White ran for reelection in 1815, but he lost to fellow Federalist Magnus Tate with 420 votes (36.65 percent of the vote), while Tate had 726.

=== Virginia State Senate ===
Following his term in the United States House of Representative, White continued to operate his farms on the Cacapon and North rivers. In 1823, White was elected as a member of the Virginia State Senate, defeating opponent candidate Ignatius O'Ferrall. White held the seat until 1824. White's seat in the Virginia State Senate represented District 6, which consisted of Berkeley, Hampshire, Hardy, and Morgan counties.

While serving in the Virginia State Senate, White was appointed sheriff of Hampshire County on December 9, 1823, by Virginia Governor James Pleasants. On Thursday, January 1, 1824, White informed the Virginia State Senate of his appointment to the position of Hampshire County sheriff, and he asked for an opinion as to whether he could retain his senate seat while serving as sheriff. White's inquiry was referred to the senate's Committee of Privileges and Elections for "consideration and a report of their opinion thereupon to the House." The following day, on Friday, January 2, 1824, the Committee of Privileges and Elections delivered their opinion: White should vacate his senate seat upon his acceptance of the position of Hampshire County sheriff, and the sheriffs of the senate district's four counties were directed to hold a special election to "supply the vacancy occasioned." On Tuesday, February 3, 1824, the Virginia State Senate certified the election of Elisha Boyd to fill White's senate seat.

== Later life and death ==
White continued to serve as Hampshire County's sheriff until his death. White died on October 6, 1826, at his residence on the Cacapon River in Hampshire County. He was interred at the White Family Graveyard at Hayfield in Frederick County, Virginia.

== Personal life and family ==
White married his first cousin, Margaret White, in Frederick County on December 5, 1787. Margaret White was the daughter of White's uncle, Robert White II. White and his wife had at large family, with at least six children:

- Robert Norvell White, married Matilda McBride, daughter of John McBride
- Thomas B. White
- John A. White
- Francis White, Jr. (1799 – September 8, 1868)
- A daughter, married to a Mr. Keyes
- Mary M. White McDonald (1811 – February 7, 1839), married Evan McDonald, son of Benjamin and Margaret Hiett McDonald

== Land ownership ==
White amassed extensive landholdings in Hampshire County. In 1797, White purchased 233 acres (0.94 km^{2}) along the North River in Hampshire County from Henry and Rachael Pierce of Cecil County, Maryland. White purchased an additional 20 acres (0.081 km^{2}) along the North River in 1800. At the time of his election to the United States House of Representatives, White was a resident of Romney.

== Bibliography ==
- Ambler, Charles Henry (1910). Sectionalism in Virginia from 1776 to 1861. Chicago, Illinois: University of Chicago Press. OCLC 608613818.
- Horton, Vicki Bidinger (2009). Hampshire County [West] Virginia Personal Property Tax Lists, 1800–1814. Genealogical Publishing Company. ISBN 978-0-8063-4862-9. Archived from the original on June 27, 2014.
- Kerns, Wilmer L. (1995). Frederick County, Virginia: Settlement and Some First Families of Back Creek Valley, 1730–1830. Gateway Press, Incorporated. Archived from the original on June 27, 2014.
- Maxwell, Hu; Swisher, Howard Llewellyn (1897). History of Hampshire County, West Virginia From Its Earliest Settlement to the Present. Morgantown, West Virginia: A. Brown Boughner, Printer. OCLC 680931891. OL 23304577M.
- Munske, Roberta R.; Kerns, Wilmer L., eds. (2004). Hampshire County, West Virginia, 1754–2004. Romney, West Virginia: The Hampshire County 250th Anniversary Committee. ISBN 978-0-9715738-2-6. OCLC 55983178.
- Sage, Clara McCormack; Jones, Laura Elizabeth Sage (1939). Early Records, Hampshire County, Virginia: Now West Virginia, Including at the Start Most of Known Va. Aside from Augusta District. Genealogical Publishing Company. ISBN 978-0-8063-0305-5. Archived from the original on January 4, 2014.
- United States Congress (1973). The United States Congressional Directories: 1789 – 1840. Columbia University Press. ISBN 978-0-231-03365-7.
- United States Congress (2005). Biographical directory of the United States Congress, 1774–2005: the Continental Congress, September 5, 1774, to October 21, 1788, and the Congress of the United States, from the First through the One Hundred Eighth Congresses, March 4, 1789, to January 3, 2005. Washington, D.C.: Government Printing Office. ISBN 978-0-16-073176-1. Archived from the original on June 28, 2014.
- Virginia General Assembly (1823). Journal of the Senate of Virginia. Superintendent of Public Printing. Archived from the original on April 16, 2018.
- Virginia State Library (1917). Report of the Virginia State Library, Volumes 13-15. Virginia State Library, Division of Purchase and Printing. Archived from the original on January 5, 2014.

U.S. House of Representatives
Preceded by John Baker	Member of the U.S. House of Representatives from Virginia's 2nd congressional district 1813 – 1815	Succeeded by Magnus Tate
Virginia House of Delegates
Preceded by Elias Poston	Member of the Virginia House of Delegates from Hampshire County; 1794; Served alongside: Isaac Parsons	Succeeded by Elias Poston
Preceded by William Donaldson; John Higgins	Member of the Virginia House of Delegates from Hampshire County; 1809–1813; Served alongside: Alexander King	Succeeded by George Sharfe; Frederick Sheetz
Preceded by Edward McCarty; William Naylor	Member of the Virginia House of Delegates from Hampshire County; 1818–1823; Served alongside: William Armstrong, Jr. Ephraim Dunn; Edward McCarty	Succeeded by Christopher Heiskell; Alexander King
Senate of Virginia
Unknown	Member of the Virginia State Senate from Berkeley, Hampshire, Hardy, and Morgan Counties; 1823–1824	Succeeded by Elisha Boyd
Civic offices
Preceded by E. M. McCarty	Sheriff of Hampshire County; 1823 – 1826	Succeeded by Isaac Kuykendall
