= William Armstrong (Virginia politician) =

American lawyer, civil servant, politician, and businessperson

Honorable William Armstrong

Member of the U.S. House of Representatives from Virginia's 16th district
- In office March 4, 1825 – March 3, 1833
- Preceded by: James Stephenson
- Succeeded by: James M. H. Beale

Member of the Virginia House of Delegates from Hampshire County
- In office 1818–1820 Serving with Francis White
- Preceded by: Edward McCarty; William Naylor
- Succeeded by: Edward McCarty; Francis White

Personal details
- Born: December 23, 1782 Lisburn, County Antrim, Ireland
- Died: May 10, 1865 (aged 82) Keyser, West Virginia, U.S. (Note: The post office for Keyser, West Virginia, was first established as Paddytown in 1811; reestablished as Paddy Town in 1852; then renamed New Creek Depot in 1852; then Wind Lea in 1855; then New Creek Station in 1857; and finally Keyser in 1874, when the city was incorporated. Keyser was located within Virginia until the formation of West Virginia in 1863; and it was a part of Hampshire County until the creation of Mineral County in 1866.)
- Resting place: Indian Mound Cemetery, Romney, West Virginia, U.S.
- Party: Democratic-Republican; National Republican; Whig
- Spouse(s): Elizabeth Ann McCarty; Jane Baxter Armstrong
- Children: Eliza Jane Armstrong Gibson; William James Armstrong; Edward McCarty Armstrong; James Dillon Armstrong
- Profession: Lawyer; civil servant; politician; businessperson

William Armstrong (December 23, 1782 – May 10, 1865) was an American lawyer, civil servant, politician, and businessperson. He represented Hampshire County in the Virginia House of Delegates from 1818 to 1820, and Virginia's 16th congressional district in the United States House of Representatives from 1825 to 1833.

Armstrong was born in 1782 in Lisburn, County Antrim, Ireland, and emigrated to the United States in 1792. He studied law under Charles Magill, became a lawyer, and settled in Hampshire County, Virginia (present-day West Virginia). Armstrong served in a number of civil service positions, including postmaster of Paddytown (present-day Keyser); U.S. tax collector appointed by President James Madison; director of the Bank of the Valley of Virginia; member of the Virginia Board of Public Works from 1822 to 1823; justice of the peace for Hampshire County from 1820 to 1852; and Hampshire County sheriff in 1843. Armstrong was chosen as a presidential elector for Virginia in the 1820 and 1824 U.S. presidential elections.

He was elected to two terms in the Virginia House of Delegates and four terms in the U.S. House of Representatives, two as an Adamsite Democratic-Republican and two as a National Republican. In Congress, he assisted in passing a bill to appropriate funds to construct the Chesapeake and Ohio Canal in 1828. Following his tenure in Congress, Armstrong engaged in the tavern business and operated the Armstrong House hotel in Romney. In 1862, he relocated to Keyser, where he died in 1865.

== Early life and education ==
William Armstrong was born on December 23, 1782, in Lisburn, County Antrim, Ireland. Armstrong's family was Presbyterian and of Scotch-Irish descent. He was a direct descendant of James Armstrong, who participated in the rising of the Covenanters at the Battle of Pentland Hills. He forfeited his estate in 1666 and escaped from Annandale, Dumfriesshire, Scotland, to County Down. In 1792, Armstrong emigrated to the United States with his parents and the family settled in Romney, Virginia (present-day West Virginia). Following his arrival in Romney, Armstrong worked as a merchant's clerk, and then served as an assistant in the office of the Hampshire County Clerk of Court. Armstrong studied law under Charles Magill in Winchester, became a lawyer and settled permanently in Hampshire County.

== Civil service career ==
Armstrong served as the second postmaster of the post office in Paddytown (present-day Keyser, West Virginia) from October 15, 1814, until April 20, 1818. President James Madison appointed him a United States tax collector in the 6th District of Virginia in 1813; he also served in this position in 1818 and 1819. In January 1818, Armstrong was unanimously elected as a director of the Bank of the Valley of Virginia's Office of Discount and Deposit in Romney. In 1822 and 1823, he served as a member of the Virginia Board of Public Works. Armstrong served as a justice of the peace of Hampshire County from 1820 to 1852, and as the sheriff for Hampshire County in 1843.

== Political career ==
Armstrong first ran for election as a Democratic-Republican to represent Hampshire County as a member of the Virginia House of Delegates in 1811, however, he lost to Federalists Alexander King and Francis White. In 1812, he ran again for election to represent the county in the House of Delegates losing to King and White. In August 1816, Armstrong and John Jack represented Hampshire County at a convention in Staunton to reform the Constitution of Virginia. Armstrong was finally elected to represent the county in the House of Delegates in 1818, alongside White, and served his first term from December 7, 1818, until March 13, 1819. He was reelected with White in 1819 and served his second term from December 6, 1819, until February 25, 1820. Edward McCarty and White succeeded him in 1820.

In 1816, when Virginia's presidential electors convened at his father's hotel in Romney, Armstrong became interested in national politics. He was chosen as a presidential elector for Virginia in the 1820 and 1824 U.S. presidential elections. Armstrong ran for election as an Adamsite Democratic-Republican against Federalist Edward Colston to represent Virginia's 16th congressional district in the U.S. House of Representatives in 1825, and won. Virginia's 16th congressional district comprised Berkeley, Hampshire, Hardy, Jefferson, and Morgan counties in the present-day Eastern Panhandle of West Virginia. Armstrong represented the 16th district in the 19th Congress from March 4, 1825, to March 3, 1827. He was elected for a second term as an Adamsite Democratic-Republican and served in the 20th Congress from March 4, 1827, to March 3, 1829. Armstrong joined U.S. House representatives Michael C. Sprigg from Maryland, and Andrew Stewart and Chauncey Forward from Pennsylvania to assist in passing a bill to appropriate funds for the construction of the Chesapeake and Ohio Canal in 1828. Armstrong was elected for a third term as a National Republican and served in the 21st Congress from March 4, 1829, to March 3, 1831, and for his fourth term as a National Republican and served in the 22nd Congress from March 4, 1831, to March 3, 1833. By 1839, Armstrong was the chairperson of Hampshire County's Whig Party.

== Later life and death ==
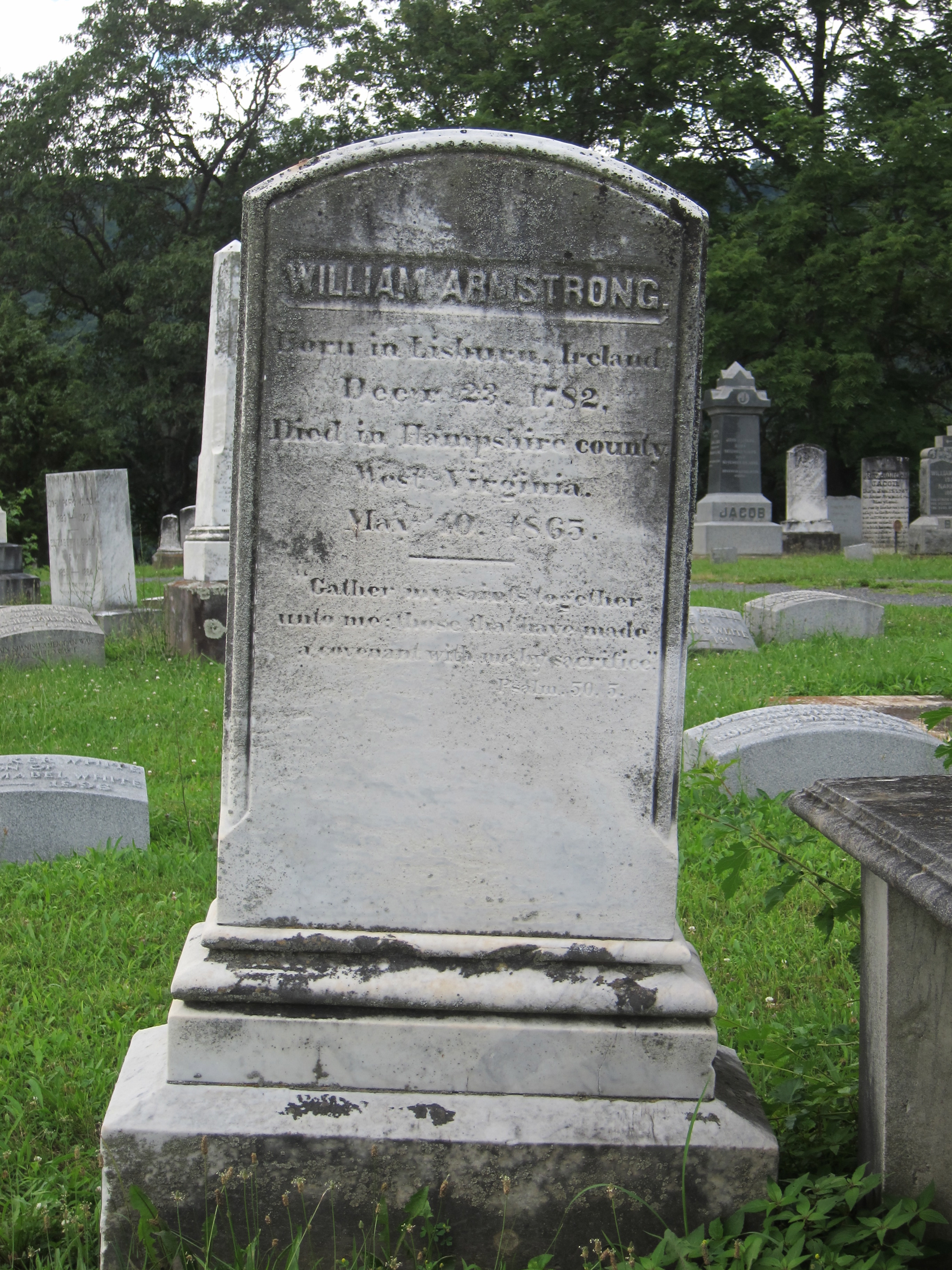
Armstrong's gravesite at Indian Mound Cemetery

Following his tenure in Congress, Armstrong engaged in the tavern business. The arrival of the Northwestern Turnpike (present-day U.S. Route 50) to Romney in 1830 created a greater demand for inns and hotels in the town. Armstrong and John Kirk, and Armstrong's wife, Jane, and John Baker White were issued two of at least six hotel licenses in Romney within five years after the turnpike's construction. Armstrong's hotel, known as Armstrong House, was built around 1800 on Lot 86 at East Main and North Grafton Streets. Armstrong sold his hotel to Thomas A. Keller in 1848, after which it was known as Keller House or Keller Hotel. Armstrong remained in Romney until 1862.

Armstrong was a slave owner. He possessed 16 acres (6.5 ha) in Romney, including Lots 81 and 91 near the intersection of present-day Antigo Place and Sioux Lane, where he reserved 0.5 acres (0.20 ha) for an African-American cemetery.

He relocated to New Creek Station (formerly Paddytown, present-day Keyser) during the American Civil War, where he resided at his son Edward McCarty Armstrong's mansion. His son Edward joined the Confederate States Army, while Armstrong remained at the mansion with his daughter-in-law and grandchildren. He died in New Creek Station on May 10, 1865. Reverend James H. Leps conducted his funeral service in Romney, and he was interred at Indian Mound Cemetery in Romney.

== Personal life ==
Armstrong was first married to Elizabeth Ann McCarty (June 1, 1786 – July 4, 1843), daughter of Edward McCarty and Elizabeth Millar, from Keyser. They had four children together:

- Eliza Jane Armstrong Gibson (December 21, 1804 – February 19, 1847), married David Gibson
- William James Armstrong (June 28, 1813 – June 19, 1847), married on December 14, 1836, to Susan C. White, daughter of Hampshire County Clerk of Court John Baker White and Alcinda Louisa Tapscott White
- Edward McCarty Armstrong (October 18, 1816 – April 1, 1890), first married to Hannah Angeline Pancake, then married on October 23, 1856, to Louisa Tapscott White, daughter of Hampshire County Clerk of Court John Baker White and Frances Ann Streit White
- James Dillon Armstrong (September 23, 1821 – September 4, 1893), married Anne Waterman Foote, daughter of Presbyterian Reverend William Henry Foote

Armstrong and McCarty were married for 42 years. Following Elizabeth's death, he married his cousin Jane Baxter Armstrong (June 7, 1799 – August 30, 1874).

== Bibliography ==
- Brannon, Selden W. (1976). Historic Hampshire: A Symposium of Hampshire County and Its People, Past and Present. Parsons, West Virginia: McClain Printing Company. ISBN 978-0-87012-236-1. OCLC 3121468.
- Federal Writers' Project (1937). Historic Romney 1762–1937. Romney, West Virginia: Federal Writers' Project, The Town Council of Romney, West Virginia. OCLC 2006735. Archived from the original on January 1, 2014.
- Leps, James H. (1865). A Funeral Discourse, by the Rev. Jas. H. Leps, at Romney, West Va. on the Occasion of the Death of the Hon. William Armstrong, Who Died at New Creek Station, West Va. on the 10th May, 1865. Baltimore: John W. Woods, Printer. OCLC 652541197.
- Lewis, Virgil A. (1906). First Biennial Report of the Department of Archives and History of the State of West Virginia. Charleston, West Virginia: The Tribune Printing Company. OCLC 17743218 – via Internet Archive.
- Lyle, Maria Catherine Nourse, ed. (1897). James Nourse and His Descendants. Lexington, Kentucky: Transylvania Printing Company. OCLC 729493200. Archived from the original on October 16, 2020 – via Google Books.
- Maxwell, Hu; Swisher, Howard Llewellyn (1897). History of Hampshire County, West Virginia From Its Earliest Settlement to the Present. Morgantown, West Virginia: A. Brown Boughner, Printer. OCLC 680931891. OL 23304577M.
- Miller, Thomas Condit; Maxwell, Hu (1913). West Virginia and Its People. Vol. III. New York: Lewis Historical Publishing Company. OCLC 794221752. Archived from the original on July 1, 2014 – via Google Books.
- Munske, Roberta R.; Kerns, Wilmer L., eds. (2004). Hampshire County, West Virginia, 1754–2004. Romney, West Virginia: The Hampshire County 250th Anniversary Committee. ISBN 978-0-9715738-2-6. OCLC 55983178.
- Scotch-Irish Society of America (1894). The Scotch-Irish in America: Proceedings and Addresses of the Sixth Congress. Nashville, Tennessee: Scotch-Irish Society of America; Barbee & Smith, Agents. OCLC 1181187561 – via Internet Archive.
- Swem, Earl G.; Williams, John W. (1918). A Register of the General Assembly of Virginia 1776–1918 and of the Constitutional Conventions. Richmond, Virginia: Davis Bottom, Superintendent of Public Printing. OCLC 12043949 – via Internet Archive.
- Wolfe, William W. (1974). History of Keyser, West Virginia 1737–1913. Keyser, West Virginia: Keyprint, Inc. OCLC 1056129 – via Internet Archive.

U.S. House of Representatives
Preceded by James Stephenson	Member of the U.S. House of Representatives from Virginia's 16th congressional district 1825–1833	Succeeded by James M. H. Beale
Virginia House of Delegates
Preceded by Edward McCarty; William Naylor	Member of the Virginia House of Delegates from Hampshire County; 1818–1820; Served alongside: Francis White	Succeeded by Edward McCarty; Francis White
