= Robert Rutherford (politician) =

American politician (1728–1803)

Member of the U.S. House of Representatives from Virginia's 1st district
- In office March 4, 1793 – March 3, 1797
- Preceded by: Alexander White
- Succeeded by: Daniel Morgan

Member of the Virginia Senate from Frederick, Berkeley, Hampshire and Hardy Counties
- In office 1786–1790
- Preceded by: Himself
- Succeeded by: John Smith

Member of the Virginia Senate from Frederick, Berkeley and Hampshire Counties
- In office 1776–1785
- Preceded by: Position established
- Succeeded by: Himself

Personal details
- Born: October 20, 1728 Scotland, Kingdom of Great Britain
- Died: October 10, 1803 (aged 74) Charles Town, Virginia, U.S. (now West Virginia)
- Resting place: Charles Town, West Virginia
- Party: Democratic-Republican (after 1795)
- Other political affiliations: Anti-Administration (until 1795)

Robert Rutherford (October 20, 1728 – October 10, 1803) was an American pioneer, soldier and statesman from western Virginia. He represented Virginia in the United States House of Representatives from 1793 until 1797.

Robert was born in Scotland but emigrated to America as an infant with his parents, Thomas and Sarah. They originally immigrated to Pennsylvania, but soon settled in Virginia. He was the first U.S. Congressman from west of the Blue Ridge mountains in Virginia.

Captain Robert Rutherford commanded a company of rangers (Rutherfords Rangers) during the French and Indian War from 1757-1758.

== Electoral history ==
- 1793; Rutherford was elected to the U.S. House of Representatives with 56.61% of the vote, defeating nonpartisans Alexander White and John Smith.
- 1795; Rutherford was re-elected, defeating nonpartisan Daniel Morgan.

U.S. House of Representatives
Preceded by Alexander White	Member of the U.S. House of Representatives from Virginia's 1st congressional district 1793–1797	Succeeded by Daniel Morgan
