= Edward Colston (American politician) =

American politician

Member of the U.S. House of Representatives from Virginia's 2nd district
- In office March 4, 1817 – March 3, 1819
- Preceded by: Magnus Tate
- Succeeded by: Thomas Van Swearingen

Member of the Virginia House of Delegates from Berkeley County
- In office 1834; Alongside Edmund P. Hunter
- In office 1826–1827; Alongside William Good, Moses T. Hunter
- In office 1823–1824; Alongside Israel Robinson
- In office 1816; Alongside George Portersfield
- In office 1812–1813; Alongside George Portersfield, Elisha Boyd

Personal details
- Born: December 25, 1786 "Honeywood", Berkeley County, Virginia
- Died: April 23, 1852 (aged 65) "Honeywood", Berkeley County, Virginia
- Resting place: Honey Wood, Berkeley County, Virginia
- Party: Federalist (before 1833)
- Other political affiliations: Whig (after 1833)
- Education: Princeton College
- Occupation: lawyer

Military service
- Allegiance: United States of America
- Battles/wars: War of 1812

Edward Colston (December 25, 1786 – April 23, 1852) was a Virginia lawyer, slaveholder and Federalist (and later Whig) politician who served in the Virginia House of Delegates and United States House of Representatives.

== Early and family life ==
The eldest son born to Elizabeth Marshall (1756-1842; sister of future Chief Justice John Marshall), and her husband Raleigh Colston (1749-1823), Edward Colston was born into the First Families of Virginia on his father's estate, "Honeywood," overlooking the Potomac River in what became Berkeley County, West Virginia, about a decade after his death. He had three younger brothers and three sisters, and inherited Honeywood, which he would operate until his death. As was customary for gentleman of his class, Edward Colston received a private education, then was sent to New Jersey for higher studies. He graduated from Princeton College in 1806, then read law.

He first married Jane Marshall of Fauquier County, but she died in 1815. In 1825 Colston met and married Jane Brockenbrough of Richmond, and they had three sons and four daughters. After this Edward Colston's death, all their sons (Raleigh T. Colston, Edward Colston Jr. and William Brockenbrough Colston) would become Confederate States Army officers, after recruiting the Hedgesville Blues (which became part of the Stonewall Brigade, 2nd Virginia Infantry). Only Raleigh died in the war (one of the few casualties of the Battle of Mine Run in 1863); William followed his father's path into Berkeley County politics and the junior Edward became a lawyer politician in Cincinnati, Ohio. His nephew Raleigh E. Colston (son of his brother Dr. Raleigh T. Colston) would become a controversial Confederate general and also survived the Civil War.

== Career ==
Edward Colston was admitted to the bar and practiced in what later became the Eastern Panhandle of West Virginia, although the local Berkeley County judges chose fellow lawyer, soldier and politician Elisha Boyd as the local prosecutor (and he would serve four decades).

Like Boyd, Colston served in the War of 1812, volunteering as a private in Charles Faulkner's artillery company (which helped defend Norfolk and Portsmouth against British land and naval forces). He later received a lieutenant's commission in an infantry regiment.

Berkeley County voters elected Colston to the Virginia House of Delegates several times. He first served from 1812 until 1814, then from 1816 to 1817, before winning election to the Fifteenth Congress (March 4, 1817 – March 3, 1819) with 64.35% of the vote, defeating Democratic-Republicans Daniel Morgan and Robert Bailey. Colston did not seek re-election but returned to Honeywood because his father needed help handling the family's plantations. In the 1820 census, this Edward Colston owned 13 slaves and also farmed with the assistance of one free black boy. His father owned more slaves. By 1840, Edward Colston's family had grown to include 10 persons (6 of them children), and 18 slaves, as well as the now-over 55 year old free black man and a 24 to 34 year old free black woman.

After his father's death in 1823, Berkeley County voters again elected Edward Colston as one of their representatives in the House of Delegates, so he served from 1823 to 1828, and then from 1833 to 1835. He lost an attempt to return to the U.S. Congress in 1825 to Democratic-Republican William Armstrong of Hampshire County. Berkeley County voters also elected Colston their High Sheriff in 1844 and 1845.

In 1835, Colston built a dam to create slackwater on the upper Chesapeake and Ohio Canal and power a mill. The mill burned several times in the ensuing decades, and the dam also became a strategic site in the American Civil War. It was superseded by a paper mill c. 1900, but the dam exists today as Honeywood Dam (on the National Register of Historic Places and within the Chesapeake and Ohio Canal National Historical Park).

== Death and legacy ==
Colston died on his estate "Honeywood," near modern Hedgesville, West Virginia, on April 23, 1852, and was interred in the family burying ground.

U.S. House of Representatives
Preceded by Magnus Tate	Member of the U.S. House of Representatives from Virginia's 2nd congressional district 1817–1819	Succeeded by Thomas Van Swearingen
