= 23rd Virginia Cavalry Regiment =

- Flag of Virginia, 1861
- Active: April 1864 – April 1865
- Disbanded: April 1865
- Country: Confederacy
- Allegiance: Confederate States of America
- Branch: Confederate States Army
- Type: Cavalry
- Engagements: American Civil War: Valley Campaigns of 1864

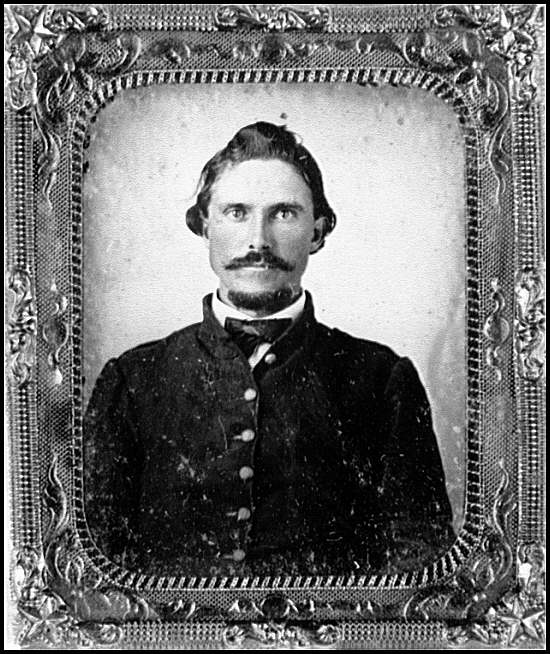
Pvt. Hite Bird, 23 Virginia Cavalry

The 23rd Virginia Cavalry Regiment was a cavalry regiment raised in Virginia for service in the Confederate States Army during the American Civil War. The regiment was recruited primarily in the counties of Hampshire, Hardy, Morgan, Berkeley, Frederick, Clarke, Shenandoah, Warren, Rockingham, Augusta, Allegheny and Henrico. It fought in the Shenandoah Valley.

Virginia's 23rd Cavalry Regiment was organized in April, 1864, by consolidating seven companies of the 41st Battalion Virginia Cavalry and two companies of O'Ferrall's Battalion Virginia Cavalry. The unit served in Imboden's Brigade and was involved in various conflicts in the Shenandoah Valley. It disbanded during April, 1865. The field officers were Colonel Robert White, Lieutenant Colonel Charles T. O'Ferrall, and Major Fielding H. Calmese.

== See also ==
- List of Virginia Civil War units
- List of West Virginia Civil War Confederate units
