= Robert White (attorney general) =

American lawyer and politician

Honorable Robert White
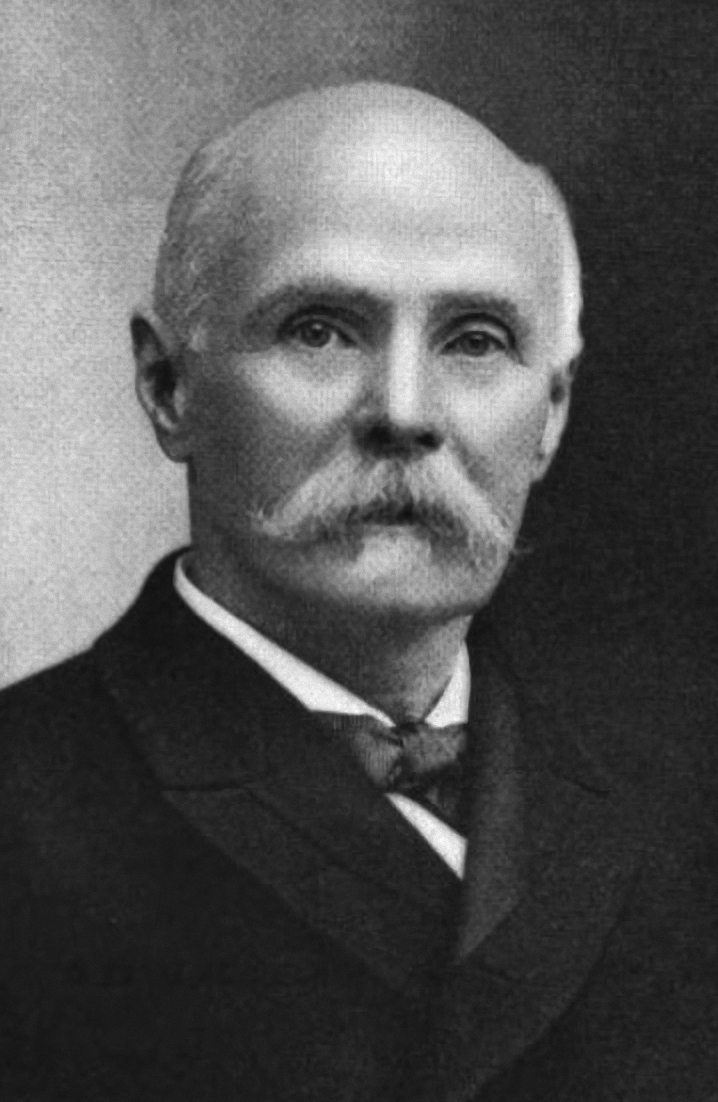
- Portrait of Robert White in later life

8th Attorney General of West Virginia
- In office 1877–1881
- Governor: Henry Mason Mathews
- Preceded by: Henry Mason Mathews
- Succeeded by: Cornelius Clarkson Watts

Personal details
- Born: February 7, 1833 Romney, Virginia (now West Virginia), United States
- Died: December 12, 1915 (aged 82) Wheeling, West Virginia, United States
- Resting place: Greenwood Cemetery
- Party: Democratic Party
- Spouse: Ellen E. Vass
- Relations: Robert White (grandfather); Christian Streit White (brother); Francis White (great-uncle); John Baker White (nephew); Robert White (nephew); Samuel Lightfoot Flournoy (brother-in-law)
- Children: John Baker White; James C. White; Robert White; Marshall V. White; Eleanor "Nellie" R. White; Katherine "Kate" White Ferrell Hancher
- Parent(s): John Baker White (father); Frances Ann Streit (mother)
- Profession: Military officer; lawyer; politician

Military service
- Allegiance: Confederate States of America
- Branch/service: Confederate States Army
- Years of service: 1861–65
- Rank: Colonel (1864–65)
- Unit: Company I of the 13th Virginia Volunteer Infantry Regiment (1861–63)
- Commands: 41st Battalion Virginia Cavalry (1863–64); 23rd Virginia Volunteer Cavalry Regiment (1864–65)
- Battles/wars: American Civil War

Robert White (February 7, 1833 – December 12, 1915) was an American military officer, lawyer, and politician in the U.S. state of West Virginia. White served as Attorney General of West Virginia (1877–1881) and served two terms in the West Virginia House of Delegates, representing Ohio County in 1885 and 1891.

Born in 1833 in Romney, Virginia (present-day West Virginia), White was the son of Hampshire County Court Clerk John Baker White and his second wife, Frances Ann Streit White. He was educated at the Romney Classical Institute, worked in his father's clerking office for six years, and studied jurisprudence under John White Brockenbrough at his Lexington Law School. White was admitted to the bar in 1854 and practiced law in Romney.

Prior to the outbreak of the American Civil War, White was commissioned a captain of the Frontier Riflemen, which later became Company I of the 13th Virginia Volunteer Infantry Regiment, commanded by Colonel A. P. Hill in 1861. In 1864, he was commissioned as a colonel in command of the 23rd Virginia Volunteer Cavalry Regiment and served in that capacity until the unit disbanded in April 1865. Following the war, White returned to Romney and practiced law with John Jeremiah Jacob. He devoted his efforts to bringing economic development to the South Branch Potomac River Valley, which had been desolated during the war. White was one of nine members to revive the Romney Literary Society following the war, and in 1870, the organization successfully secured the West Virginia Schools for the Deaf and Blind for Romney. He served three terms on the school's board of regents. White also established the South Branch Railway Company and was its president until 1877.

White was elected as West Virginia's attorney general in 1876 and served from 1877 until 1881. He was charged with several important lawsuits, among the most prominent being the state's pursuance of tax liabilities from railroad companies. White argued the case before the Supreme Court of Appeals of West Virginia, which ruled in White's favor and ultimately enriched the West Virginia state treasury. He successfully secured the extradition of Elihu Gregg from Pennsylvania after Gregg was accused of burning the Preston County courthouse and fled. In Freeland v. Williams, White argued in favor of the rights of former Confederate soldiers before the Supreme Court of the United States and secured a favorable verdict. Following his tenure as attorney general, White served two terms in the West Virginia House of Delegates. In 1885, he represented the state at the Washington Monument's dedication. White subsequently served two terms as the city solicitor of Wheeling, and was later counsel for the Baltimore and Ohio Railroad Company.

In his later life, White was involved in Confederate memorial activities. He was a member of the Confederate Memorial Association board of trustees, the chief officer of the West Virginia Division of the United Confederate Veterans, and served as commander with the rank of major-general in the national organization. White was chairman of the construction committee for the Confederate Memorial Institute's Battle Abbey in Richmond. He was a Freemason and served as Grand Master of the state of West Virginia in 1875. White attended the 100th anniversary of the burial of George Washington in 1899 and was chosen by the Grand Lodge of Virginia as the Grand Marshal of the Masonic ceremonies while attending the observance at Mount Vernon. He also became a noted lecturer and orator in his later years. Following a prolonged illness, White died in Wheeling in 1915.

== Early life and education ==
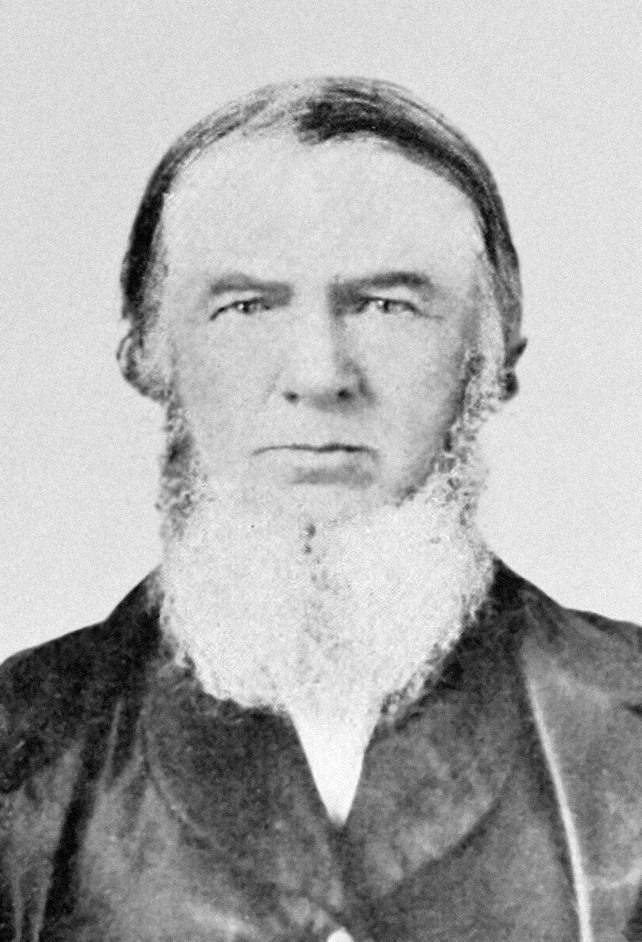
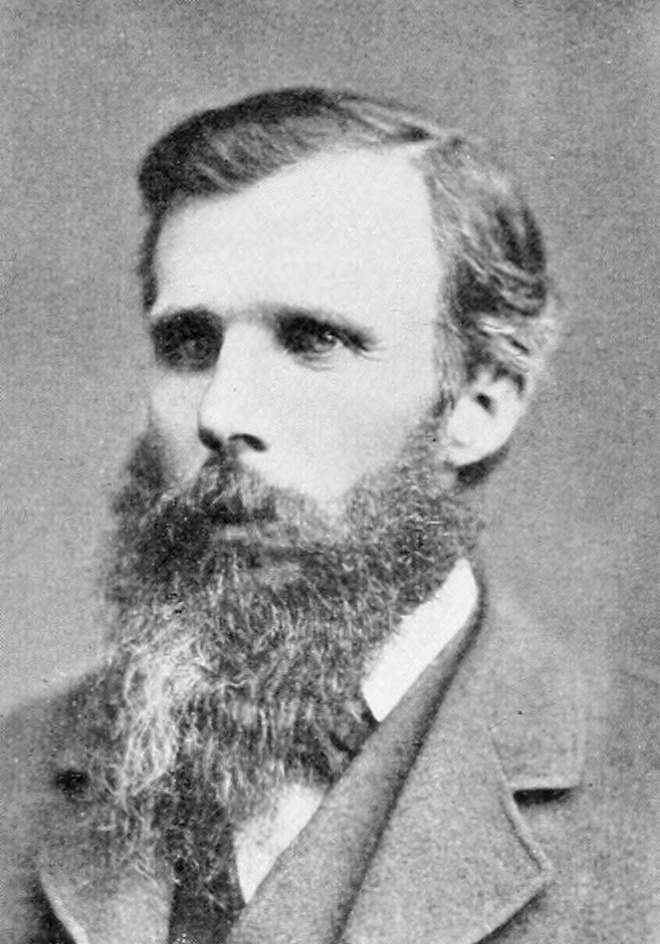
John Baker White (left) and Christian Streit White (right)

Robert White was born on February 7, 1833, in Romney, Virginia, part of present-day West Virginia. White was the eldest son and child of Hampshire County court clerk John Baker White (1794–1862) and his second wife Frances Ann Streit White (c. 1809–1879) and a grandson of prominent Virginia judge Robert White (1759–1831). He was likely named for his grandfather, Judge Robert White.

White had three older half sisters from his father's first marriage to Alcinda Louisa Tapscott. Through his father's second marriage to his mother Frances Ann Streit, White had five brothers including Christian Streit White, and four sisters.

White obtained his primary education in local common schools, including the Romney Classical Institute, which was presided over by Dr. William Henry Foote. Beginning at the age of 14, he worked in his father's Clerk of the County Court office for about six years. Following his law apprenticeship under his father, White studied jurisprudence under John White Brockenbrough at his Lexington Law School in Lexington. Following the completion of his legal studies, White was admitted to the bar on March 30, 1854, and immediately began practicing law in Romney. Along with his relative Alfred P. White, his father, and his brother Christian Streit White, Robert White became an active and influential member of the Hampshire County bar. Prior to the American Civil War, White was enrolled as a member of the Romney Literary Society.

== Confederate Army service ==
In 1860, following John Brown's raid on Harpers Ferry in October 1859, a Virginia uniformed volunteer military company known as the Frontier Riflemen was formed with White as commanding officer in the rank of captain. Following the outbreak of the Civil War, Governor John Letcher ordered the Frontier Riflemen to report to Lieutenant General Stonewall Jackson at Harpers Ferry. White and his unit marched to Harpers Ferry on May 18, 1861. He and his unit traveled north on the Moorefield and North Branch Turnpike to the Baltimore and Ohio Railroad mainline at Green Spring, then to Harpers Ferry. Following their arrival, White's company was reassigned as Company I of the 13th Virginia Volunteer Infantry Regiment commanded by Colonel A. P. Hill. The company marched from Harpers Ferry to Winchester and returned to Romney in June 1861, at which time they occupied the town for several days.

A detachment under White's command, consisting of White's Company I, Company K, and the 1st Tennessee, were then sent to New Creek to destroy railroad bridges. The detachment successfully burned the bridges, after which it engaged in a skirmish with the Cumberland Home Guards. White's forces defeated the guards and captured two cannons, their first trophies of war. Colonel Hill marched to Winchester, and Company I then came under the command of General Joseph E. Johnston.

During the Winter of 1861–62, White was reassigned to the ordnance department and served in that capacity until 1863, when he was authorized to raise and command a battalion of cavalry. White formed the 41st Battalion Virginia Cavalry in September 1863 and continued to serve as the battalion's commanding officer until seven of its companies were consolidated with two companies of O'Ferrall's Battalion Virginia Cavalry to form the 23rd Virginia Volunteer Cavalry Regiment in April 1864. White was then commissioned as a colonel in command of the cavalry regiment and served in that capacity until the unit disbanded in April 1865. White remained in the service of the Confederate States Army until May 14, 1865. White had served with ability throughout the war, and saw action across Virginia.

During the war, White's father John Baker White left Romney with his wife and youngest children and traveled to Richmond to work in the Confederate States Department of the Treasury within the government of the President of the Confederate States of America. However, White's father died soon after his arrival in Richmond on October 9, 1862.

== Reconstruction efforts ==
Following the war, White returned to Romney. Since his father had died, he became the family patriarch and resumed practicing law to support them. In 1865, he entered into a practice with John Jeremiah Jacob until Jacob began his tenure as Governor of West Virginia in 1871. White then expanded his law practice and it became the largest of its kind in the Eastern Panhandle of West Virginia. He continued his law practice until 1877, when he became Attorney General of West Virginia.

White devoted his efforts to bringing economic development to the South Branch Potomac River Valley, which had been devastated during the course of the American Civil War and remained undeveloped during the Reconstruction Era. In an effort to rebuild his hometown, Romney, following the war, White sought to first memorialize the Confederate war dead. Early in the Spring of 1866, a meeting was held at White's home in Romney with his wife Ellen E. Vass White, his brother Christian Streit White, Elizabeth "Bessie" Jane Schultze (later Mrs. Christian Streit White), and his sister Frances "Fannie" Ann Armstrong White (later Mrs. Samuel Lightfoot Flournoy). Following this meeting, an inspired group of Hampshire County women assembled and adopted a constitution for the Confederate Memorial Association, of which White's wife served as a president. Through the association's efforts, the first decoration of Confederate graves at Indian Mound Cemetery took place on June 1, 1866. The association sponsored the construction of the Confederate Memorial at Indian Mound Cemetery, which was dedicated on September 26, 1867.

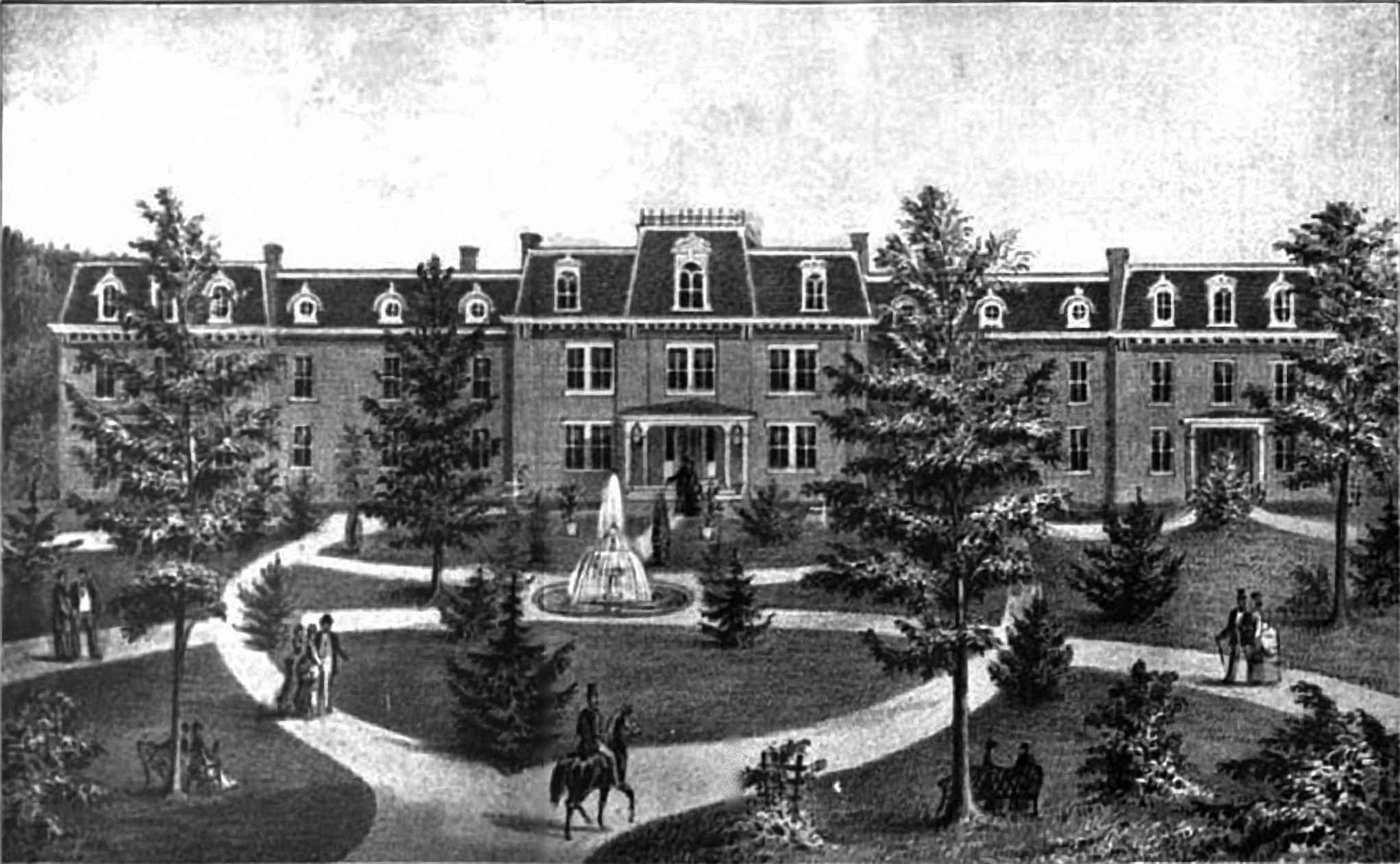
West Virginia Schools for the Deaf and Blind administration building

On May 15, 1869, nine members of the Romney Literary Society, including White, commenced an effort to revive the society's activities and reconstitute its library, which had been destroyed during the war. When the state of West Virginia first founded an institution for deaf and blind students, White helped to pass the legislative act that established the West Virginia Schools for the Deaf and Blind. On April 20, 1870, during a meeting of the schools' Board of Regents, in Wheeling, White and Andrew Wodrow Kercheval were sent by the Romney Literary Society to make a formal offer of the Romney Classical Institute buildings and grounds to the board. Through White's efforts, the school was established on the former campus of the Romney Classical Institute in Romney, where it remains as of 2015.

White was subsequently appointed to serve three terms on the schools' Board of Regents. White was appointed to the board of regents' first (1870), second (1871–1873), and third (1874–1876) terms, and served as its secretary each time. In his report to Governor William E. Stevenson at the close of the institutions' first school year, in 1871, White wrote: "The board has to express its entire satisfaction with the present flourishing condition of the institution. The discipline, the progress of the pupils in their studies and their general improvement, deserve the highest commendation and entitle our deaf and dumb and blind institution to the unstinted patronage of the state."

In addition to his appointments to the schools' Board of Regents, White was also appointed by the West Virginia Legislature to the state boards of trustees of Capon Springs and Berkeley Springs. He resigned his position on the board of trustees of Berkeley Springs, but he remained a member of Capon Springs's board until at least 1897.

White also created a railway line linking Romney with the Baltimore and Ohio Railroad mainline at Green Spring. He established the South Branch Railway Company to accomplish this and served as the company's president for several years until relocating to Wheeling in 1877. Through his efforts, the means and finances were raised to construct the railway.

== Political career ==
=== Attorney General of West Virginia ===
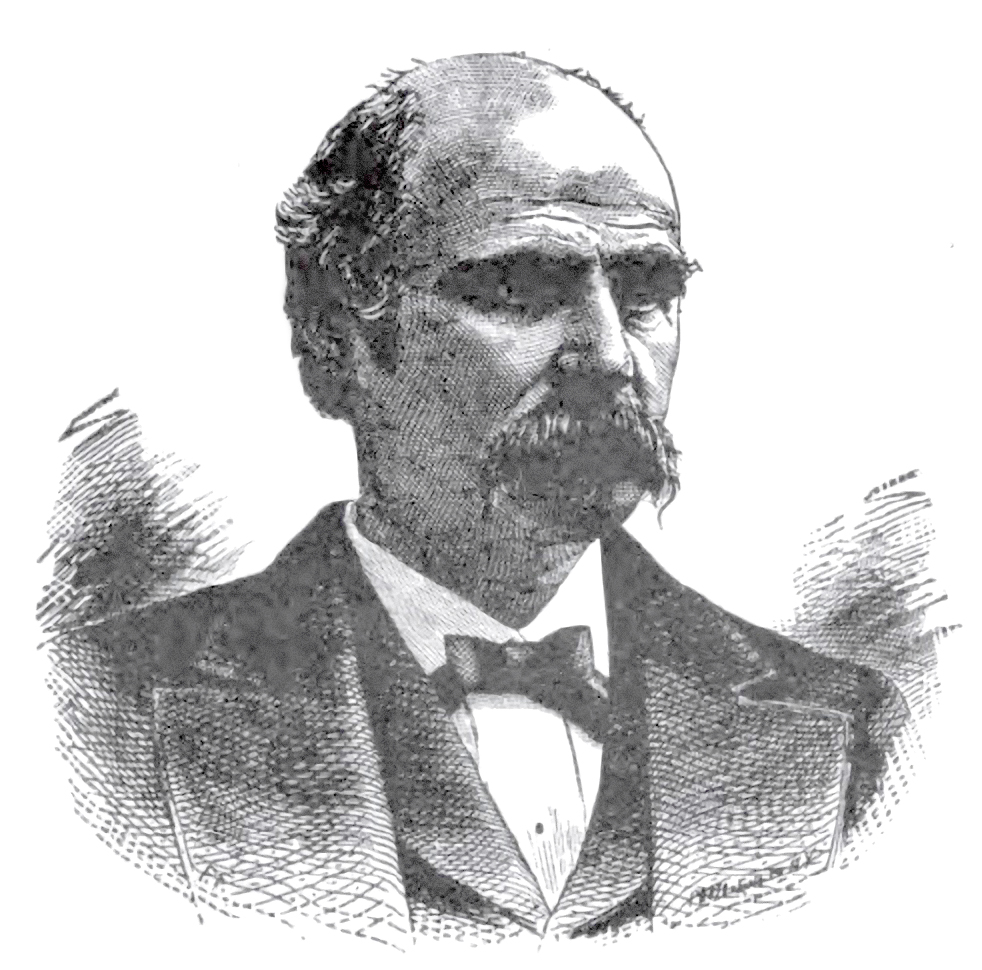
An engraving of White, 1879

White was a lifelong member of the Democratic Party. In 1876, White was nominated at the West Virginia Democratic Party Convention held in Charleston as the party's candidate for Attorney General of West Virginia despite not expressing interest in the position. That November, White was elected to the office by the largest majority won by politician in West Virginia up until that time. At the time of his election, the state's capital was Wheeling and on April 1, 1877, he relocated there with his family to serve in his post. On the morning of his departure from Romney, the residents of the community bid White farewell by turning out with two brass bands and escorting White and his family to the outskirts of town. There, an address was delivered by one of Romney's elder residents, and the White family left for Wheeling.

During his tenure as attorney general, White was in charge of several important lawsuits, among the most prominent being the state's pursuit of tax liabilities from railroad companies. Prior to his election as attorney general, railroads had never paid taxes in the state of West Virginia. White instituted proceedings to tax all the railroads within the state. The Chesapeake and Ohio Railway Company obtained an injunction against the levying of the taxes, leading to a judicial test case. White argued the case first in the lower courts, and then before the Supreme Court of Appeals of West Virginia, which ruled in White's favor. The Supreme Court of the United States affirmed the ruling of the state supreme court, which compelled the railroads to pay taxes to the state.

White also played prominent role in his position as attorney general during the case of Elihu Gregg. Gregg had been convicted by the Preston County Circuit Court of burning the county courthouse and the public records therein, and causing the death of a janitress asleep in the courthouse at the time of the fire. Gregg was sentenced to death for these crimes, but following his sentence, he escaped to Greene County, Pennsylvania, to the company of his friends and supporters, as the Gregg family was prominent in the region.

Gregg's extradition was ordered by West Virginia Governor Henry Mason Mathews, and White argued successfully the case before Pennsylvania Governor John F. Hartranft for Gregg's extradition back to West Virginia. Gregg immediately obtained writ of habeas corpus and was brought before the Green County Court presided over by Judge Wilson of Fayette County, Pennsylvania.

White traveled to the Green County Courthouse where he was met by an infuriated mob of Gregg's friends and supporters who had been awaiting him. The mob threatened to lynch White for attempting to return Gregg to West Virginia to carry out his sentence. White had been forewarned of the threats and advised him to leave town quietly. He responded by stating that he had a duty to perform and would perform it "if it were the will of a higher power," and if not, he would die in his attempt to secure right and justice. White made his way to the courthouse, and by a few well-chosen remarks, secured the attention of the crowd. White depicted Gregg's crime in detail, during which time he was reportedly on his feet for five hours and twenty minutes. After which, Gregg was extradited back to West Virginia.

White was associated with another high profile case, Kitzmiller v. Williams, which involved the belligerent rights of former Confederate soldiers. The case was on appeal from the Supreme Court of Appeals of West Virginia, and White argued the case before the United States Supreme Court, securing a favorable verdict. The case was significant as even though hundreds of similar cases had been previously fought, it was not until this point that the rights of former Confederate soldiers were recognized.

During his term as attorney general, White maintained a private law office on Chapline Street in Wheeling. White declined to accept a reelection to the office of West Virginia Attorney General.

=== West Virginia House of Delegates ===
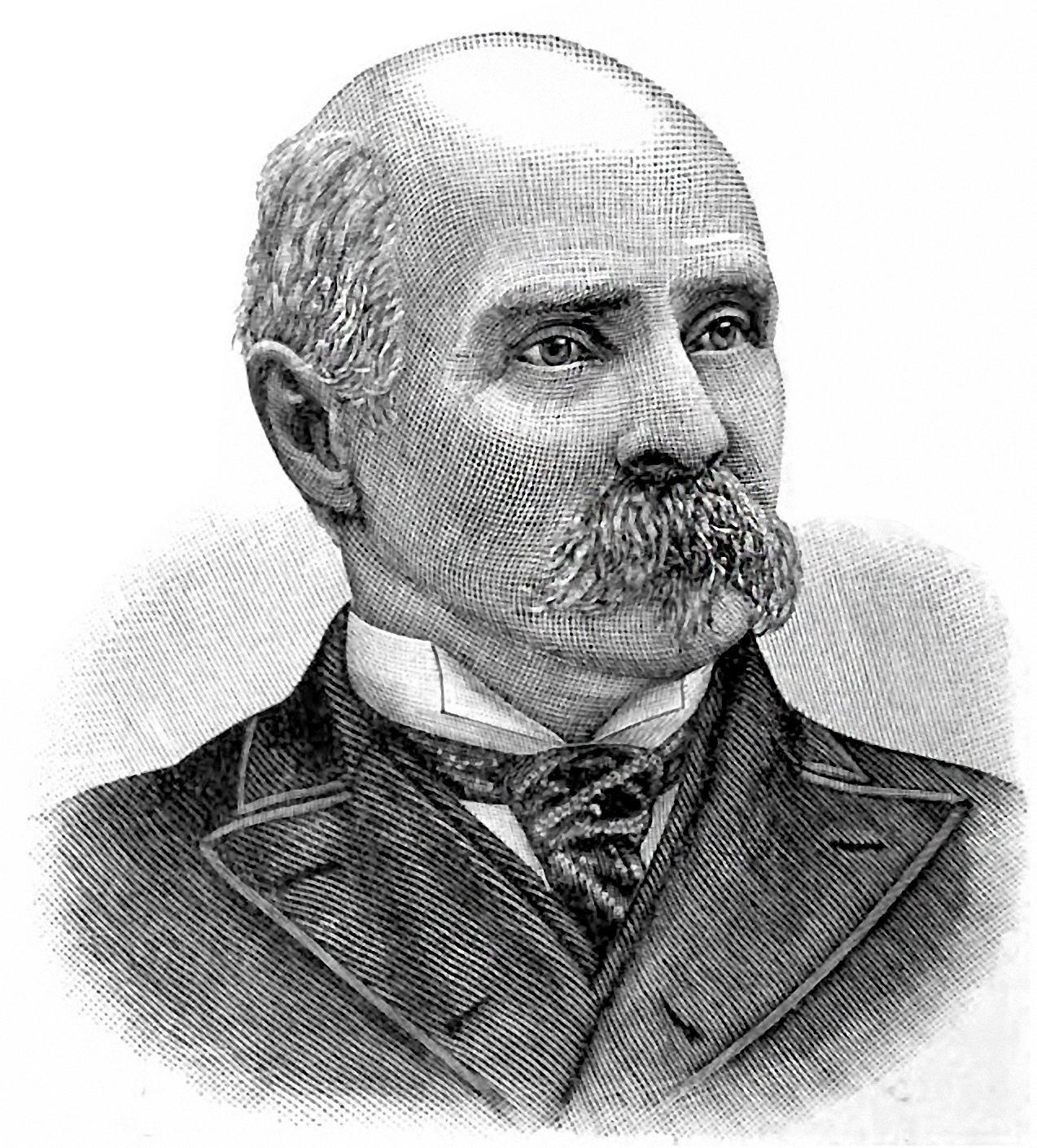
An engraving of White, 1890

Following his tenure as West Virginia Attorney General, White served two terms in the West Virginia House of Delegates representing Ohio County, first in 1885, and again in 1891. According to a 1903 biography, White was described as an "able, incorruptible and active legislator." During both sessions, he served as chairman of the Finance Committee and also served in other important capacities, including on the Judiciary Committee.

The West Virginia Legislature of 1891 was composed largely of members of the West Virginia Democratic Party, of which White was a member. In 1891, White's colleagues in the legislature delivered a testimonial to White in gratitude for his service. It stated:

"SIR:– Among the members of the Legislature of West Virginia there is a general desire to express to you in some formal way their appreciation of the great zeal, ability and untiring industry that have marked your course in the Legislature this session. As chairman of the Finance Committee and one of the Judiciary Committee of the House, the duties incumbent upon you have been exceeding [sic] important and exacting, both in committee room and on the floor of the House. In the performance of these duties you have been so zealous, industrious, painstaking and conservative as to attract the attention and win the respect and confidence of the entire legislature and to deserve thanks and gratitude not only of your fellow members but of the people of the state at large. Permit us, therefore, to tender to you some expression of our appreciation of the benefit of the State derived from your earnest labors to say that we all feel that you have fully deserved not only our commendation but a right to the gratitude and respect of your fellow citizens throughout the State of West Virginia."

=== Subsequent political positions ===
In 1885, White was appointed by Governor Jacob B. Jackson to represent the state of West Virginia at the dedication of the Washington Monument in Washington, D.C. During the dedication ceremony on February 21, 1885, White acted as one of the assistants to the grand marshal.

White served two terms as the city solicitor of Wheeling, and for many years, he served as a counsel for the Baltimore and Ohio Railroad Company. During his tenure there, White was charged with some of the most important cases that were tried the courts of West Virginia at the time. He was also twice-elected as president of the Ohio County Bar Association. During this time, White also served as the legal advisor on the board of directors of the Ohio Valley Life Company.

== Later life and death ==
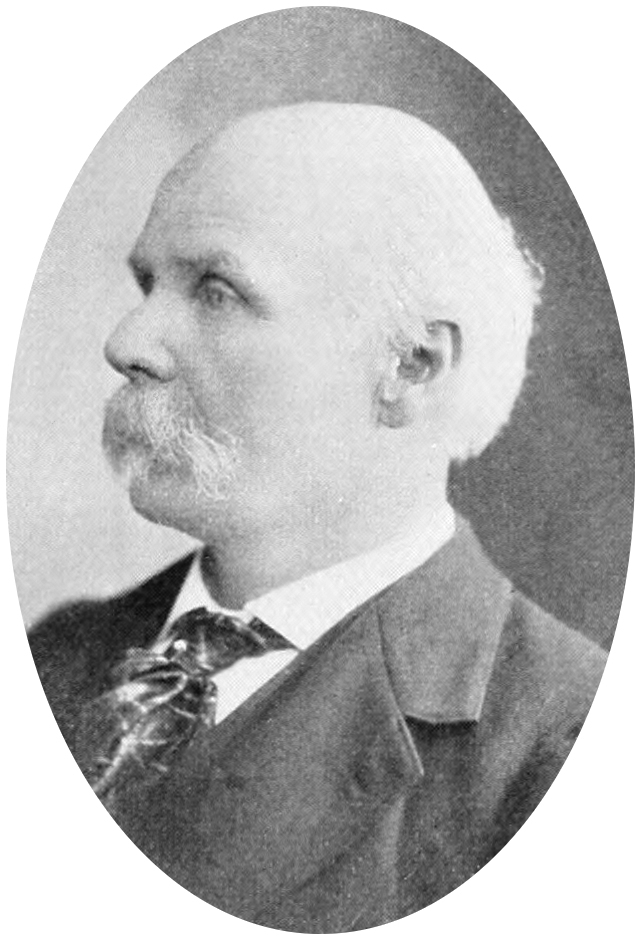
White photographed prior to 1897

White was an adherent of the Presbyterian faith, and for many years he served as a ruling elder of the First Presbyterian Church of Wheeling. He also represented the presbytery at the centennial session of the General Assembly of the Presbyterian Church, which met in Philadelphia.

White was a member of the arbitration convention of the Sons of the American Revolution which was held in Washington, D.C., in May 1896, and also served as the president of the West Virginia Society of that organization. White was a member of the board of trustees of the Confederate Memorial Association, and on September 4, 1896, he was made a member of the organization's executive committee in Chattanooga, Tennessee. White also served as the chief officer of the West Virginia Division of the United Confederate Veterans. In that organization, White held the position of commander and rank of major-general. On May 30, 1903, White was the orator at the Confederate memorial ceremony held at Hollywood Cemetery in Richmond.

Following United Confederate Veterans' September 1909 meeting in Charleston, White was reelected to his post as commander. By 1896, White led a local endeavor to establish a West Virginia Home for Confederate Veterans. In 1911, he was on the chairman of the committee for the construction of the Confederate Memorial Institute's Battle Abbey in Richmond.

On May 20, 1912, a ceremony was held in Richmond for the laying of the cornerstone of the Confederate Memorial Institute's Battle Abbey. White gave the ceremony's principal address, in which he delivered an exhaustive history of the movement for the construction of the abbey and spoke on the importance of the abbey being built in the former Confederate capital. He also called for the cooperation of the Southern states in providing artifacts to the abbey.

From his early adulthood until his death, White was a Freemason and served as Grand Master of the state of West Virginia in 1875. In that capacity, he laid the cornerstone of the capitol building at Wheeling. Prior to his relocation to Wheeling, he was also Master of the Clinton Lodge of Masons in Romney. On October 26, 1899, he gave an address according to Grand Lodge ritual at the cornerstone laying ceremony of the new school in Wellsburg. White attended the 100th anniversary of the interment of George Washington on December 14, 1899, and was chosen by the Grand Lodge of Virginia as the chief Grand Marshal of the Masonic ceremonies while attending the observance. He and his staff had full charge of the procession and all matters of the celebration. A reproduction of Washington's funeral services were held at Mount Vernon, and White served as a commander of the occasion, where he stood beside President William McKinley during his address to those in attendance. Prior to the anniversary, in November 1899, the National Christian Association published sheets in the anti-secret society publication Christian Cynosure in which they denied Washington's Freemasonry affiliations. White released a statement in which he remarked: "This attack is the meanest thing I ever saw in a Christian publication." He further went on to illustrate a historic narrative citing the dates of Washington's Masonic activities and affiliations.

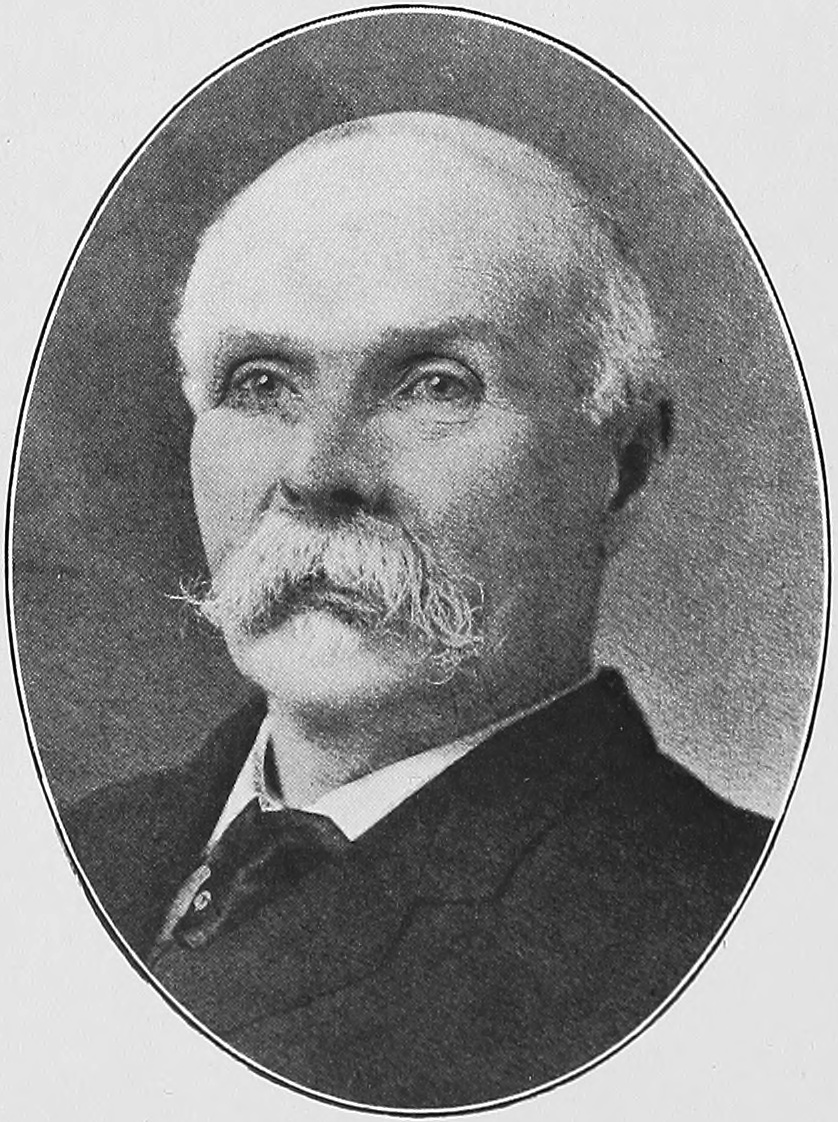
White in photographic portrait, published in 1905

White was also called upon to serve as Grand Marshal during the visit of Admiral Dewey to Wheeling on February 22, 1900. He was remembered by Dewey, who subsequently sent White his picture with his compliments and signature at the top.

In his later life, White became a noted lecturer. One of his more popular lectures was entitled "The Old Foundation Stands," which was prepared and delivered by White in response to Robert G. Ingersoll's lecture "The Foundation of Faith," in which Ingersoll criticized the Old Testament of the Bible. White delivered the lecture in several states. During the summer of 1900, White traveled throughout Europe. He visited the village of Oberammergau in Germany, after which, he created a lecture illustrating the Oberammergau Passion Play.

White was an active member of the West Virginia Bar Association for many years, and served as its president in 1914. When he celebrated his 82nd birthday in February 1915, he enjoyed dinner with his close friends at his Bae Mar Place home. He suffered from a prolonged illness throughout 1915, which caused him to miss a number of high profile engagements. For example, White was to have been the guest of James Taylor Ellyson, Lieutenant Governor of Virginia during the United Confederate Veterans Reunion Week in Richmond, but cancelled his visit on May 30, 1915, on account of his ill health. He was also slated to give the address at the commencement exercises of the Richmond Academy on June 4, 1915, but was unable to attend due to his declining health. White died of "old age" on December 12, 1915, in his residence on Bae Mar Place in Wheeling, after having been ill for six months prior. White was interred at Greenwood Cemetery in Wheeling on December 14, 1915. White was survived by his daughter Kate White Ferrell, his brother Christian Streit White, and his wife Ellen. His wife died in Richmond on December 17, 1921, and was interred beside him at Greenwood Cemetery.

== Personal life and family ==
In 1859, White married Ellen E. Vass (July 23, 1839 – December 17, 1921), the daughter of James C. Vass. James C. Vass was an influential banker at the old Bank of Virginia in Richmond. Through her mother, Ellen Vass was related to Chief Justice of the United States John Marshall and Robert E. Lee, and her paternal grandfather was a wealthy merchant in Fredericksburg. White and his wife Ellen had six children together: John Baker White, who died at the age of four; James C. White, who died in infancy; Robert White, who died after the war; Marshall V. White (July 5, 1867 – 1894), a businessman in Philadelphia; Eleanor "Nellie" R. White (February 28, 1868 – September 18, 1881), who died in a railroad collision near Grafton; and Katherine "Kate" White Ferrell Hancher (February 13, 1870 – July 29, 1950), who married first to Chiles M. Ferrell of Richmond, and later married a Mr. Hancher.

Upon relocating to Wheeling in 1877, White and his wife resided at 7 13th Street, and they later relocated to 125 14th Street. The latter house became a contributing property to the East Wheeling Historic District upon its addition to the National Register of Historic Places on November 22, 1999. The couple made their final residence together at Bae Mar Place in Wheeling.

== Legacy ==
In a biography of White published in Men of West Virginia, Volume 2 in 1903, White was described as "one of the most brilliant lawyers produced by the State of West Virginia." In his 1915 obituary published in both the Charleston Daily Mail and The Wheeling Intelligencer, White was described as "always kind, courteous, but at the same time strictly exact." In May 1915 Virginia Lieutenant Governor Ellyson said that Richmond owed more to White than any other man for his efforts in securing the location of the Confederate Memorial Institute.

== Bibliography ==
- Atkinson, George Wesley (1919). Bench and Bar of West Virginia. Charleston, West Virginia: Virginian Law Book Company. OCLC 8899470.
- Atkinson, George Wesley; Gibbens, Alvaro Franklin (1890). Prominent Men of West Virginia: Biographical Sketches of Representative Men in Every Honorable Vocation, Including Politics, the Law, Theology, Medicine, Education, Finance, Journalism, Trade, Commerce and Agriculture. Wheeling, West Virginia: W. L. Callin. OCLC 3886825.
- Biographical Publishing Company (1903). Men of West Virginia, Volume 2. Chicago: Biographical Publishing Company. OCLC 670364755.
- Brannon, Selden W., ed. (1976). Historic Hampshire: A Symposium of Hampshire County and Its People, Past and Present. Parsons, West Virginia: McClain Printing Company. ISBN 978-0-87012-236-1. OCLC 3121468.
- Brant and Fuller (1890). History of the Upper Ohio Valley, With Family History and Biographical Sketches, A Statement of Its Resources, Industrial Growth and Commercial Advantages, Volume 1. Madison, Wisconsin: Brant and Fuller. Archived from the original on April 27, 2016.
- Federal Writers' Project (1937). Historic Romney 1762–1937. Romney, West Virginia: Federal Writers' Project, The Town Council of Romney, West Virginia. OCLC 2006735. Archived from the original on January 1, 2014.
- Grimm, Jean (July 1999). National Register of Historic Places Registration Form: East Wheeling Historic District. United States Department of the Interior, National Park Service.
- Kerns, Wilmer L. (1995). Frederick County, Virginia: Settlement and Some First Families of Back Creek Valley, 1730–1830. Gateway Press, Incorporated. Archived from the original on June 27, 2014.
- Maxwell, Hu; Swisher, Howard Llewellyn (1897). History of Hampshire County, West Virginia From Its Earliest Settlement to the Present. Morgantown, West Virginia: A. Brown Boughner, Printer. OCLC 680931891. OL 23304577M.
- McDonald, Cornelia Peake (1992). A Woman's Civil War: A Diary with Reminiscences of the War from March 1862. Madison, Wisconsin: University of Wisconsin Press. ISBN 978-0-29913-264-4. Archived from the original on April 1, 2016.
- Munske, Roberta R.; Kerns, Wilmer L., eds. (2004). Hampshire County, West Virginia, 1754–2004. Romney, West Virginia: The Hampshire County 250th Anniversary Committee. ISBN 978-0-9715738-2-6. OCLC 55983178.
- Newton, J. H.; Nichols, G. G.; Sprankle, A. G. (1879). J. H. Newton (ed.). History of the Pan-Handle: Being Historical Collections of the Counties of Ohio, Brooke, Marshall and Hancock, West Virginia. Wheeling, West Virginia: J. A. Caldwell. ISBN 978-1-55613-413-5. Archived from the original on November 12, 2015.

Legal offices
Preceded by Henry Mason Mathews	Attorney General of West Virginia; 1877–1881	Succeeded by Cornelius Clarkson Watts
