= Magnus Tate =

American politician (1767–1823)

Member of the U.S. House of Representatives from Virginia's 2nd district
- In office March 4, 1815 – March 3, 1817.
- Preceded by: Francis White
- Succeeded by: Edward Colston

Member of the Virginia House of Delegates from Berkeley County
- In office December 3, 1798 – November 30, 1800 Serving with John Baker; Alexander White
- Preceded by: Elisha Boyd
- Succeeded by: James Stevenson

Member of the Virginia House of Delegates from Berkeley County
- In office December 4, 1809 – December 1, 1811 Serving with Philip C. Pendleton, George Porterfield
- Preceded by: Aaron Faris
- Succeeded by: Andrew Waggoner, Jr

Personal details
- Born: September 1, 1767 Berkeley County, Virginia Colony, British America
- Died: March 30, 1823 (aged 55) Martinsburg, Virginia, U.S.
- Party: Federalist
- Occupation: lawyer

Magnus Tate (September 1, 1767 – March 30, 1823) was an American politician who served in the Virginia General Assembly and the U.S. Representative.

== Early and family life ==
Born in 1767 in Berkeley County in the Colony of Virginia (in the portion that is now West Virginia), Tate studied law. He was initially a Quaker and a member of the Hopewell Friends Meeting in Frederick County, Virginia in 1776, but soon afterward Quakers were forbidden to own slaves. Tate also loved horses and dogs and the fox chase.

He married and had a large family, including a son, Magnus Tate, Jr., who also served in the Virginia House of Delegates. In the 1820 Census, Tate owned 11 enslaved persons, and his household also included 13 free white persons, 5 of them under age 16 but only 2 older than 25.

== Career ==
A farmer who lived on the Dry Run Road about three miles outside Martinsburg, the Berkeley County seat, Tate was also admitted to the bar. He practiced law in what later became the Eastern Panhandle of West Virginia.

Berkeley County voters first elected Tate to the Virginia House of Delegates (a part time position) in 1797 and re-elected him in 1798. He was appointed justice of the Berkeley County Court on May 19, 1798, thus becoming the county magistrate. He again won election to the House of Delegates (a part time position) in 1809 and 1810.

Tate was elected as a Federalist to the Fourteenth Congress (March 4, 1815 – March 3, 1817) with 63.35% of the vote, defeating fellow Federalist Francis White. Tate won election as the Berkeley County sheriff in 1819 and again in 1820.

== Death and legacy ==
He died near Martinsburg, Virginia (now West Virginia) on March 30, 1823. His son Magnus Tate Jr. also became a member of the Virginia House of Delegates in 1802 and was re-elected in 1803.

== Sources ==
- United States Congress. "Magnus Tate (id: T000047)". Biographical Directory of the United States Congress.

U.S. House of Representatives
Preceded by Francis White	Member of the U.S. House of Representatives from Virginia's 2nd congressional district 1815–1817	Succeeded by Edward Colston
