= John Baker (Virginia politician) =

American politician (1769–1823)

Member of the U.S. House of Representatives from Virginia's 2nd district
- In office March 4, 1811 – March 4, 1813
- Preceded by: James Stephenson
- Succeeded by: Francis White

Member of the Virginia House of Delegates from the Berkeley County district
- In office 1798–1799 Serving with Magnus Tate

Personal details
- Born: 1769 Frederick County, Province of Maryland, British America
- Died: August 18, 1823 (aged 53–54) Shepherdstown, Virginia, U.S. (now West Virginia)
- Resting place: Old Episcopal Church Cemetery
- Party: Federalist
- Spouse: Ann Mark
- Education: Washington College
- Occupation: Lawyer; politician

John Baker (1769 – August 18, 1823) was an American politician and lawyer who represented Virginia in the United States House of Representatives from 1811 to 1813.

== Early life ==
John Baker was born in 1769 in Frederick County in the Province of Maryland. He attended Washington College (now Washington and Lee University), Lexington, Virginia for three years. Later, he studied law and was admitted to the bar.

== Career ==
Baker began a law practice in Berkeley County, Virginia (now Jefferson County, West Virginia).

Baker was a member of the Virginia House of Delegates from 1798 to 1799. He was one of the lawyers who defended Aaron Burr when he was tried for treason. He was elected as a Federalist to the Twelfth Congress (March 4, 1811 – March 3, 1813) with 56.44% of the vote, defeating Democratic-Republican Daniel Morgan. After leaving Congress, he resumed the practice of law. He was the commonwealth attorney for Jefferson County.

== Personal life ==
Baker married Ann Mark, daughter of John Mark. His daughter Ann married Virginia Governor Thomas Walker Gilmer.

Baker died on August 18, 1823, in Shepherdstown, Jefferson County, Virginia (now West Virginia). He is buried in the Old Episcopal Church Cemetery.

U.S. House of Representatives
Preceded by James Stephenson	Member of the U.S. House of Representatives from Virginia's 2nd congressional district 1811–1813	Succeeded by Francis White
