= 41st Virginia Cavalry Battalion =

The 41st Virginia Cavalry Battalion was a Confederate States Army cavalry battalion during the American Civil War. It was formed in September 1863, initially with four companies and later increased to seven. It fought in western Virginia and the Shenandoah Valley. In April 1864 it was merged with another cavalry battalion to form the 23rd Virginia Cavalry.

== See also ==
- List of Virginia Civil War units

== Sources ==
- 41st Virginia Cavalry Battalion
