= Opequon Presbyterian Church =

Historic church in Virginia, United States

- U.S. National Register of Historic Places
- Virginia Landmarks Register
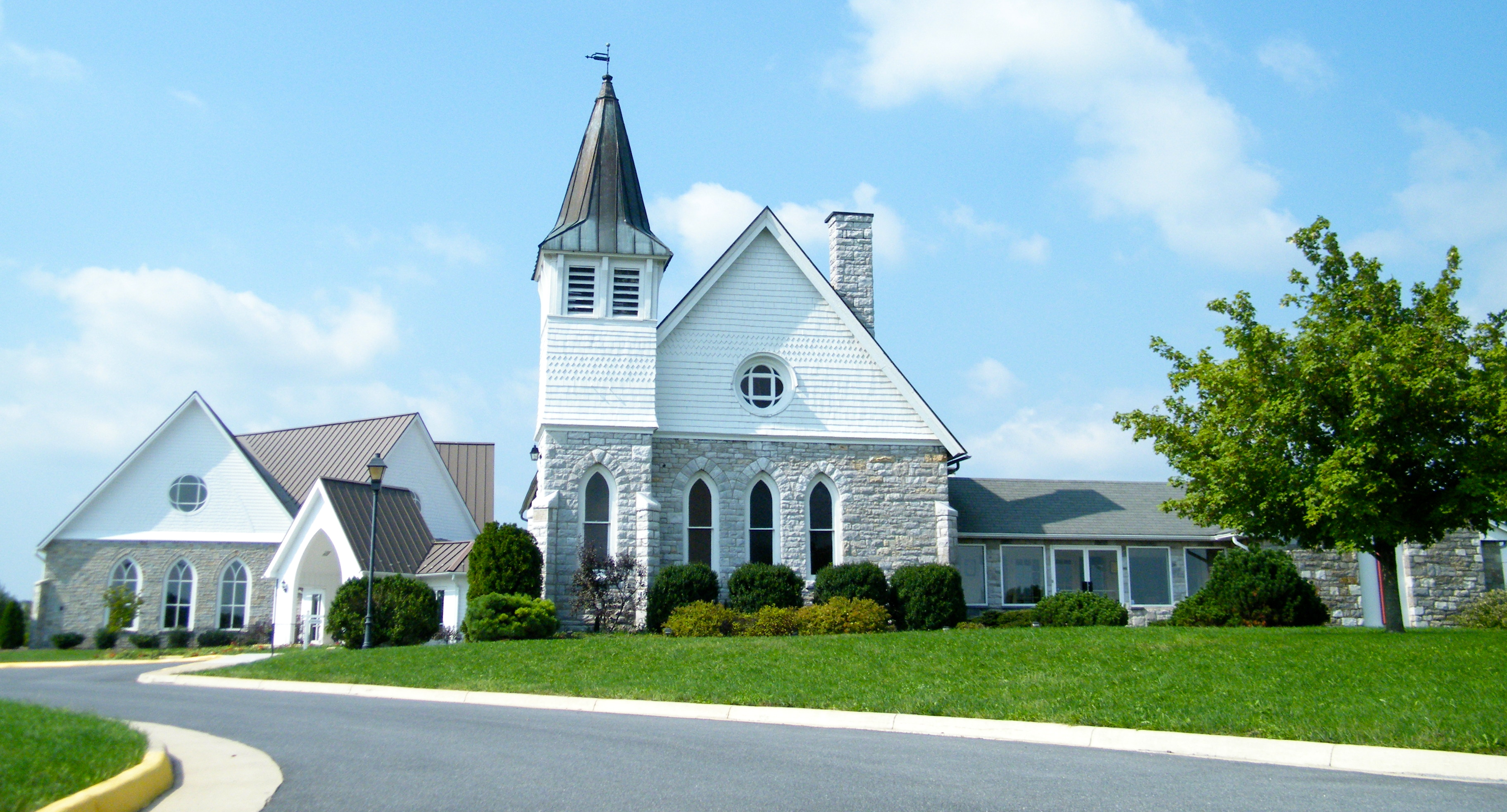
- Opequon Presbyterian Church, September 2011

- Location within Virginia Location within the United States
- Location: 217 Opequon Church Ln., near Winchester, Virginia
- Coordinates: 39°8′20″N 78°11′43″W
- Area: 5.3 acres (2.1 ha)
- Built: 1742, 1897
- Architectural style: Late Victorian, Gothic Revival
- NRHP reference No.: 01000145
- VLR No.: 034-0009

Significant dates
- Added to NRHP: February 16, 2001
- Designated VLR: December 6, 2000

Opequon Presbyterian Church is a historic Presbyterian church located near Winchester, in Frederick County, Virginia. It was built in 1897, and is a one-story, gable-roofed, random-rubble stone church. It features Gothic-arched colored-glass, one-over-one windows and a three-stage corner bell tower containing an entrance. Also on the property are four burying grounds (one contributing) with the oldest marked grave site dated to 1742.

It was listed on the National Register of Historic Places in 2001.

== Gallery ==
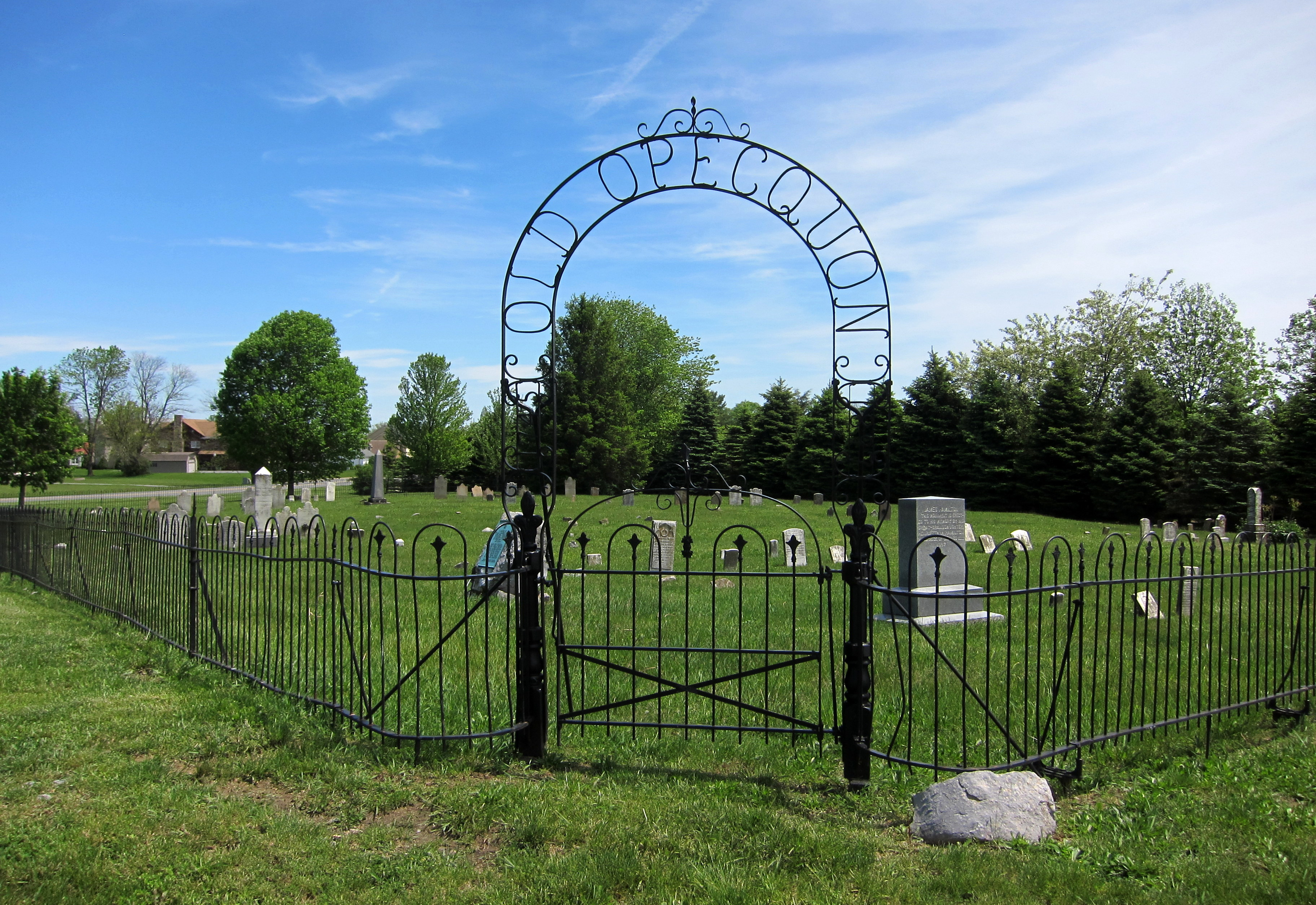
Opequon Presbyterian Church Cemetery, May 2016

== See also ==
- National Register of Historic Places listings in Frederick County, Virginia
