= Philip Alexander Bruce =

American historian (1856–1933)

- Born: March 7, 1856; Charlotte County, Virginia
- Died: August 16, 1933 (aged 77); Charlottesville, Virginia, US
- Occupation: Historian
- Writing career
- Period: 1889 - 1933
- Subjects: American History, Southern History, Virginian History

Philip Alexander Bruce (March 7, 1856 – August 16, 1933) was an American historian who specialized in the history of the Commonwealth of Virginia. Author of over a dozen volumes of history, Bruce's scope ranged from the first Virginia settlements to the early 20th century. He is known for writing the first complete history of the University of Virginia, descriptions of the lives of the original settlers of Virginia, and for his insights into Thomas Jefferson's wide-ranging intellect.

== Personal life ==
Bruce was born into a plantation family in Charlotte County, Virginia; his younger brother was William Cabell Bruce, later a US Senator from Maryland. Philip studied literature and history at the University of Virginia, graduating in 1876; he went on to get an LL.B. from Harvard University in 1879. He married Elizabeth Tunstall Taylor Newton on October 19, 1896, and together had one child, a daughter.

Bruce died at home in Charlottesville, Virginia, on August 16, 1933, and was interred at the University of Virginia Cemetery.

== Career ==
Bruce began a long career as a published historian in 1889 with the publication of The Plantation Negro as a Freeman. His most notable research came with a series of three works on seventeenth century Virginia, covering the economic, social, and institutional frameworks of the first Virginia settlers, published between 1896 and 1910.

Bruce was the corresponding secretary of the Virginia Historical Society. He was awarded honorary doctorates by both The College of William and Mary and Washington and Lee University.

In the last decade of his life, Bruce authored a five-volume history of the first hundred years of the University of Virginia, which is credited for expanding the historical perspective on the talents of Thomas Jefferson, and co-authored a five-volume history of the Commonwealth of Virginia. He died after a long illness at his home near Charlottesville. He is remembered for attempts to raise the consciousness of Northern readers to Virginia's contributions to the history of the United States through a series of letters to the New York Times on such topics as the claim of Virginia's House of Burgesses as the second elected legislature after the British Parliament and the importance of Jamestown as the first permanent English settlement in the Americas.

== Published works ==
- Bruce, Philip Alexander (1889). The Plantation Negro as a Freeman. Questions of the Day. Vol. LVII. New York: G. P. Putnam's Sons. ISBN 9780722297063.
- Bruce, Philip Alexander (1896). Economic History of Virginia in the Seventeenth Century. New York: Macmillan and Co.
- Bruce, Philip Alexander (1905). The Rise of the New South. The History of North America. Vol. 17. Philadelphia: George Barrie's Sons.
- Bruce, Philip Alexander (1907). Robert E. Lee. Philadelphia: George W. Jacobs & Co. "philip alexander bruce."
- Bruce, Philip Alexander (1907). Social Life of Virginia in the Seventeenth Century. Richmond: Whittet & Shepperson. "philip alexander bruce social life of virginia."
- Bruce, Philip Alexander (1910). Institutional History of Virginia in the Seventeenth Century. New York: G. P. Putnam's Sons. "philip alexander bruce."
- Bruce, Philip Alexander (1912). "Edgar Allan Poe". In Neale, Walter (ed.). Masterpieces of the Southern Poets. New York: Neale Publishing Company.
- Bruce, Philip Alexander (1921). History of the University of Virginia: The Lengthening Shadow of One Man. New York: Macmillan.
- Bruce, Philip Alexander; Lyon Gardiner Tyler; Richard Lee Morton; the American Historical Society (1924). The History of Virginia. Chicago: The American Historical Society.
- Bruce, Philip Alexander (1929). Virginia: Rebirth of the Old Dominion. Chicago: Lewis Publishing Co.
- Bruce, Philip Alexander (1929). The Virginia Plutarch. Chapel Hill: University of North Carolina Press. ISBN 9780807800652.

== See also ==
- Charles Henry Ambler – another preeminent historian of Virginia and West Virginia history in Bruce's day.
- History of Virginia
- History of West Virginia
