= Hayfield, Frederick County, Virginia =

Unincorporated community in Virginia, United States

- Unincorporated community
- Location within Virginia Location within the United States
- Coordinates: 39°14′3″N 78°17′23″W
- Country: United States
- State: Virginia
- County: Frederick
- Time zone: UTC−5 (Eastern (EST))
  - Summer (DST): UTC−4 (EDT)

Hayfield is an unincorporated community in Frederick County, Virginia, United States. Hayfield is located west of Winchester on the Northwestern Turnpike (US 50) at its crossroads with North and South Hayfield Roads (SR 600) between Flint Ridge and Hogue Creek. A post office has been established here since 1867. The community's Hayfield School was in operation from 1920 to 1942.

== Historic sites ==
- Hayfield School
- Mount Olive Church
