= Hu Maxwell =

American novelist

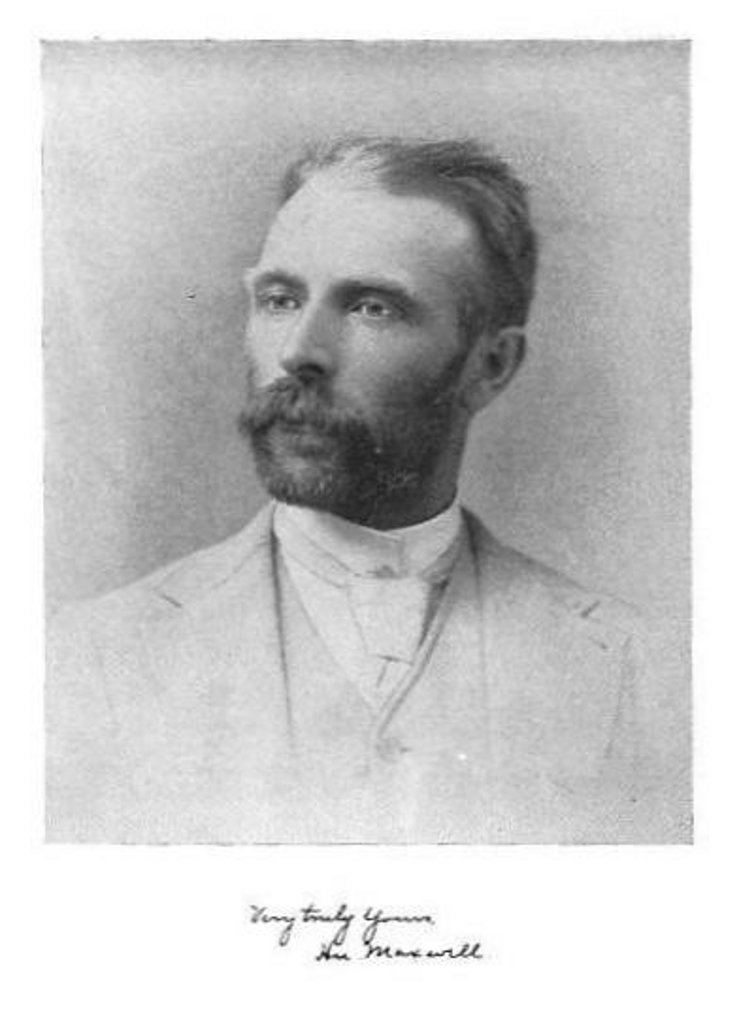
Maxwell in 1890

Hu Maxwell (September 22, 1860, Saint George, Virginia (now West Virginia) — August 20, 1927, Evanston, Illinois) was a local historian, novelist, editor, poet, and author of several histories of West Virginia counties.

== Biography ==
Maxwell was born on a farm near Horse Shoe Run in Tucker County, West Virginia, US. His father was Rufus Maxwell, first prosecuting attorney in the county, and his mother was Sarah Jane (Bonnifield) Maxwell, a school teacher. He attended county schools for a few months only and showed an early talent for versification, even before learning to write at age 14 years. His interest in geography lead his father to take him and his brothers to the 1876 Centennial Exposition in Philadelphia. After four years at the Weston Academy in Lewis County, he was appointed (1880) a cadet in the U.S. Naval Academy. He reportedly passed his matriculation exams but had a nervous breakdown owing to over strenuous studying and never entered. (He was said to have been a "loner" and "a sort of recluse", not suited to a career as a naval officer.)

Back in West Virginia he went into the lumber business, edited the Tucker County Pioneer, and wrote two novels, Rich Mountain and Llewellyn. He later taught school and wrote a never-completed manuscript, The Conquest of the Ohio Valley. In 1882 and '83, he toured the southern and southwestern States and Mexico. In 1884, Maxwell published his History of Tucker County, West Virginia at Kingwood, West Virginia, the first work presenting the early history of the Cheat River Valley.

Maxwell married Anna H. Humphreys (of Fresno, California) on 8 December 1891 and they had four children: Selby Frederick (1894-1971), Marian (born 1895), Anna (1900-1902), and Alexander Wilson (1905-1975). As a forester and topographer for the Forest Service of the U.S. Department of Agriculture, Maxwell prepared several publications dealing with forestry. He was also a frequent camping companion of President Theodore Roosevelt. Over the years, the Maxwell family resided, successively, in Morgantown, West Virginia; Washington, D.C.; and Evanston, Illinois.

In preparation for his more-than-1,000-page work A Tree History of the United States (1923), Maxwell visited every state in the Union at least once and examined 600 of the 680 tree species believed to exist in the country. In 1924 — aged 64 — Maxwell located and traced the old Indian pathway, the Seneca Trail, between Oakland, Maryland and Elkins, West Virginia — an immense physical effort of research requiring him to walk 150 miles.

Maxwell died at home in Evanston, Illinois, in 1927. He is buried in the Oak Grove Cemetery in Morgantown, West Virginia.

== Works ==
=== Books ===
- Maxwell, Hu (1884), History of Tucker County, West Virginia, From the Earliest Explorations and Settlements to the Present Time, Kingwood, W.Va: Preston Publishing Company. (Reprinted, McClain Printing Company, Parsons, W.Va., 1971).
- Maxwell, Hu (1887), Idyls of the Golden Shore (Volume of poetry)
- Maxwell, Hu (1893), Evans and Sontag, the Famous Bandits of California; Supplemental material by Charles W. Clough.
- Maxwell, Hu, and Howard Llewellyn Swisher (1897), History of Hampshire County, West Virginia: from its Earliest Settlement to the Present, Morgantown, WV: A. Brown Boughner, (Reprinted, Parsons, West Virginia: McClain Printing Co., 1972)
- Maxwell, Hu (1898), The History of Randolph County, West Virginia, From its Earliest Settlement to the Present, The Acme Publishing Company, Morgantown, W.Va. (Reprinted, McClain Printing Company, Parsons, W.Va., 1961).
- Maxwell, Hu (1899), The History of Barbour County, From its Earliest Exploration and Settlement to the Present Time, The Acme Publishing Company, Morgantown, W.Va. (Reprinted, McClain Printing Company, Parsons, W.Va., 1968).
- Hill, A.F. (1900), The White Rocks, or: The Robber's Den, a Tragedy of the Mountains, Morgantown, WV: Acme Press, Illustrated by Howard Llewellyn Swisher and Hu Maxwell.
- Fast, Richard Ellsworth and Hu Maxwell (1901), The History and Government of West Virginia, Morgantown, WV: The Acme Publishing Company.
- Maxwell, Hu (1902), Jonathan Fish and His Neighbors, Mogantown, W. Va.: Acme Publishing.
- Miller, Thomas Condit and Hu Maxwell (1913), West Virginia and its People, 3 volumes, Lewis Hist. Pub. Co.
- Cobb, William H., Andrew Price and Hu Maxwell (1921), History of the Mingo Indians, Cumberland, Md.: F.B. Jenvy, printer.
- Maxwell, Hu (1923), A Tree History of the United States.

=== Articles, monographs and contributions ===
- Maxwell, Hu (1901), "West Virginia a Century Ago", The Transallegheny Historical Magazine, Vol. 1, Issue 1, October 1901; pp 234–236.
- Maxwell, Hu (1902), “The Retreat of General Robert S. Garnett”, The Transallegheny Historical Magazine, Vol. 1, Issue 3, April 1902; pp 225–233.
- Maxwell, Hu (1902), "Early Orchards in West Virginia", The Transallegheny Historical Magazine, Vol. 2, Issue 1; Oct 1902; pg 64.
- Maxwell, Hu (1902), “The Last Survivor of the Battle of Point Pleasant” , The Transallegheny Historical Magazine, Vol. 1, Issue 3, April 1902; pp 234–236.
- Maxwell, Hu (1907), "Part First—State History"; In: Cutright, W.B. (1907), The History of Upshur County, West Virginia, from its Earliest Exploration and Settlement to the Present Time.
- Maxwell, Hu (1909), "Col. Lowther's Cabin", Illustrated Monthly West Virginian; 2:5 Jan/Feb 1909, pg 15.
- Maxwell, Hu (1910), "The Use and Abuse of Forests by the Virginia Indians", William and Mary College Quarterly Historical Magazine 19 (October 1910): 73–103.
- Hall, William L. and Hu Maxwell (1911), Uses of Commercial Woods of the United States: II Pines, Washington, DC: Government Printing Office [Forest Service Bulletin 99].
- Maxwell, Hu (1924), "The Seneca Indian Trail"; Article published in The Tucker Democrat (Tucker County, West Virginia, newspaper; defunct since 1954); Reprinted in West Virginia Review; 2:1 Aug 1925, pp 393–395. Reprinted by Randolph County Historical Society: Magazine of History and Biography; 11, 1954; pp 96–101. [Cited in: Fansler, Homer Floyd (1962), History of Tucker County, West Virginia; Parsons, West Virginia: McClain Printing Company, pg 40 (note 73).]
- Maxwell, Hu (1925), "Pioneer Sawmills of the Appalachian Region", Amer. Lumberman, 2599: pp 56–57.

=== Unpublished manuscripts ===
- Maxwell, Hu (?date), "The Conquest of the Ohio Valley" (unfinished)
- Maxwell, Hu (1927), "History of Monongalia County" [According to botanist Earl L. Core (In: The Monongalia Story: A Bicentennial History, Vol. I: Prelude (1974), Parsons, W.Va.: McClain Printing Co., n. 43, pg 69.), this "partially printed but unpublished" work includes a Chapter 2 entitled "The Vegetation Found by the Pioneers" (pp 21–55) that "contains a vast amount of early plant lore".]
