= Philip Pendleton =

Philip Pendleton may refer to:

- Philip Pendleton (soldier) (1752–1828), Virginia lawyer, soldier and politician
- Philip C. Pendleton (1779–1863), his son, Virginia attorney, planter, politician and jurist
