= Virginia Faulkner McSherry =

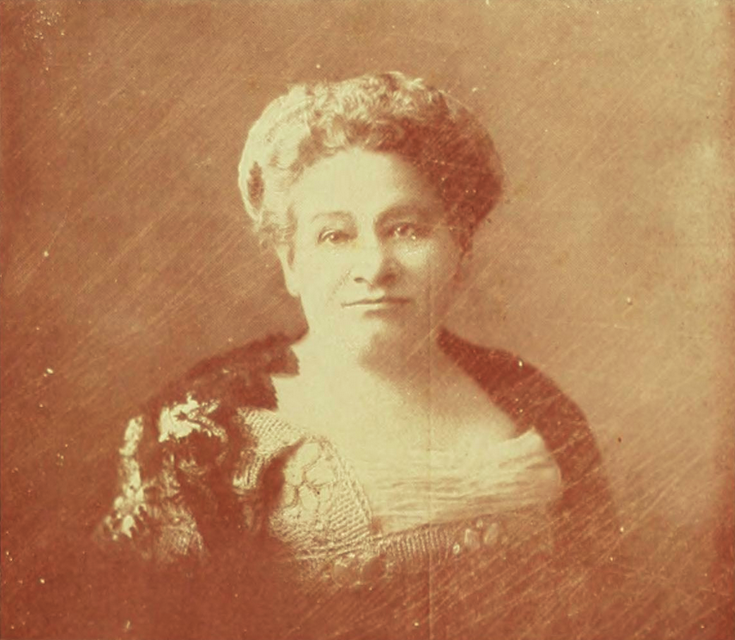
- McSherry in 1910

10th President General of the United Daughters of the Confederacy
- In office 1909–1911
- Preceded by: Cornelia Branch Stone
- Succeeded by: Rassie Hoskins White

Personal details
- Born: Virginia Faulkner; 1845 Boydville, Martinsburg, Virginia, U.S.
- Died: February 25, 1916 (aged 70–71) Martinsburg, West Virginia, U.S.
- Spouse: James Whann McSherry
- Parent: Charles James Faulkner Sr. (father)
- Relatives: Charles James Faulkner Jr. (brother); Elisha Boyd (maternal grandfather)
- Occupation: Non-profit executive

Virginia Faulkner McSherry (1845-1916) was an American clubwoman who served as the President-General of the United Daughters of the Confederacy (UDC). Loyalty to the "Lost Cause" was her watchword.

== Biography ==
Virginia Faulkner was born in Boydville, Martinsburg, Virginia (now West Virginia), in 1845. Her father was Charles James Faulkner Sr., a U.S. Representative from Virginia and West Virginia, and U.S. Minister to France, just prior to the civil war. She had at least two brothers, Charles James Faulkner, a United States senator from West Virginia, and Judge Elisha Boyd Faulkner. Her maternal grandfather was Elisha Boyd.

She was educated in the schools of Virginia, and later, during the residence abroad of her father, she took special training in Paris.

She spent the greater part of her young life, with the exception of the years she lived with her father's family in Paris, at her ancestral home, Boydville, until her marriage to Dr. James Whann McSherry. He was a prominent physician of Martinsburg.

In 1895, she organized a chapter of the UDC in her county of Berkeley. When the West Virginia Division of the UDC was organized, McSherry was elected its president, which office she filled until 1909, at Houston, Texas, when she was elected president-general of the UDC; she was re-elected, at Little Rock, Arkansas, at the succeeding election. McSherry was also a member of the Daughters of the American Revolution (DAR).

She died at her home in Martinsburg, West Virginia on February 25, 1916.
