= Philip Pendleton (soldier) =

American politician

Member of the Virginia House of Delegates from the Berkeley County district
- In office October 7, 1776 – May 3, 1778 Serving with Thomas Hite
- Preceded by: William Drew
- Succeeded by: James Nourse
- In office October 17, 1785 – October 15, 1786 Serving with Moses Hunter
- Preceded by: Adam Stephen
- Succeeded by: James Campbell
- In office June 23, 1788 – October 17, 1790 Serving with Joseph Swearingen
- Preceded by: James Campbell
- Succeeded by: Andrew Waggoner

Personal details
- Born: 1752 Martinsburg, Virginia
- Died: 1802 (aged 49–50) Martinsburg, Virginia
- Resting place: Norborne Parish Cemetery, Martinsburg, West Virginia
- Spouse: Agnes Patterson
- Children: 4 sons including Philip C. Pendleton and 3 daughters
- Occupation: lawyer, planter

Military service
- Allegiance: United States of America
- Branch/service: Virginia militia
- Years of service: 1777-1781
- Rank: colonel
- Unit: Pendleton's Regiment
- Battles/wars: American Revolutionary War

Colonel Philip Pendleton (1752 – 1802) was a Virginia lawyer and soldier who fought in the American Revolutionary War, helped found Martinsburg as well as represented Berkeley County several times in the Virginia House of Delegates.

== Early and family life ==
Pendleton was the son of Elizabeth Clayton and her husband Nathaniel Pendleton, and thus descended from the First Families of Virginia. His ancestors, brothers Nathaniel and Philip Pendleton, emigrated from England in 1674, and their descendant Judge Edmund Pendleton would perhaps become the family's most prestigious member, as well as write an early genealogy.

In 1773, this Philip Pendleton married Agnes Patterson, daughter of Angus Patterson, who bore four sons and three daughters. Their firstborn, Philip Clayton Pendleton followed his father's example into the law, politics and military service. His brothers James and William Henry died without having children, and his youngest brother Edmund Pendleton (1790-1823) had a son Isaac Purnell Pendleton, but only his daughter Serena Catherine (1816-1889) (who married her cousin Adam Stephen Dandridge Jr.) had children. This Philip Pendleton's daughters all married and had children: Elizabeth (1774-1822) married David Hunter (1761-1829) and their grandson David Hunter Strother would become a noted artist as well as Union General during the American Civil War; Anne Clayton Pendleton (1778-1854) married John Kennedy and gave birth to John Pendleton Kennedy; Sarah Pendleton (1785-1855) married Adam Stephen Dandridge (1782-1821), and their youngest daughter Maria Pendleton married lawyer John R. Cooke. Among their 13 children were the lawyer writers Philip Pendleton Cooke and John Esten Cooke, the latter becoming a Confederate officer during the Civil War.

== Career ==
One of the first lawyers in Berkeley County, Col. Pendleton led the Berkeley County militia during the American Revolutionary War, receiving a commission on April 3, 1777. In 1778, he and seven other men were elected trustees of the newly chartered town of Martinsburg.

Berkeley County voters elected this Philip Pendleton as one of their representatives in the Virginia House of Delegates (a part-time position) in 1776 and re-elected him the following year. He would also win election for a single term in 1785 and two sessions beginning in 1790. He ran as the Federalist nominee for Virginia's 1st congressional district in 1801, losing to John Smith.

== Death and legacy ==
Col. Philip Pendleton died in early 1802, since his will was admitted to probate and sons Philip C., James and William Pendleton, son-in-law David Hunter and Elisha Boyd named as executors on January 26, 1802.
