= List of federal judges appointed by John Quincy Adams =

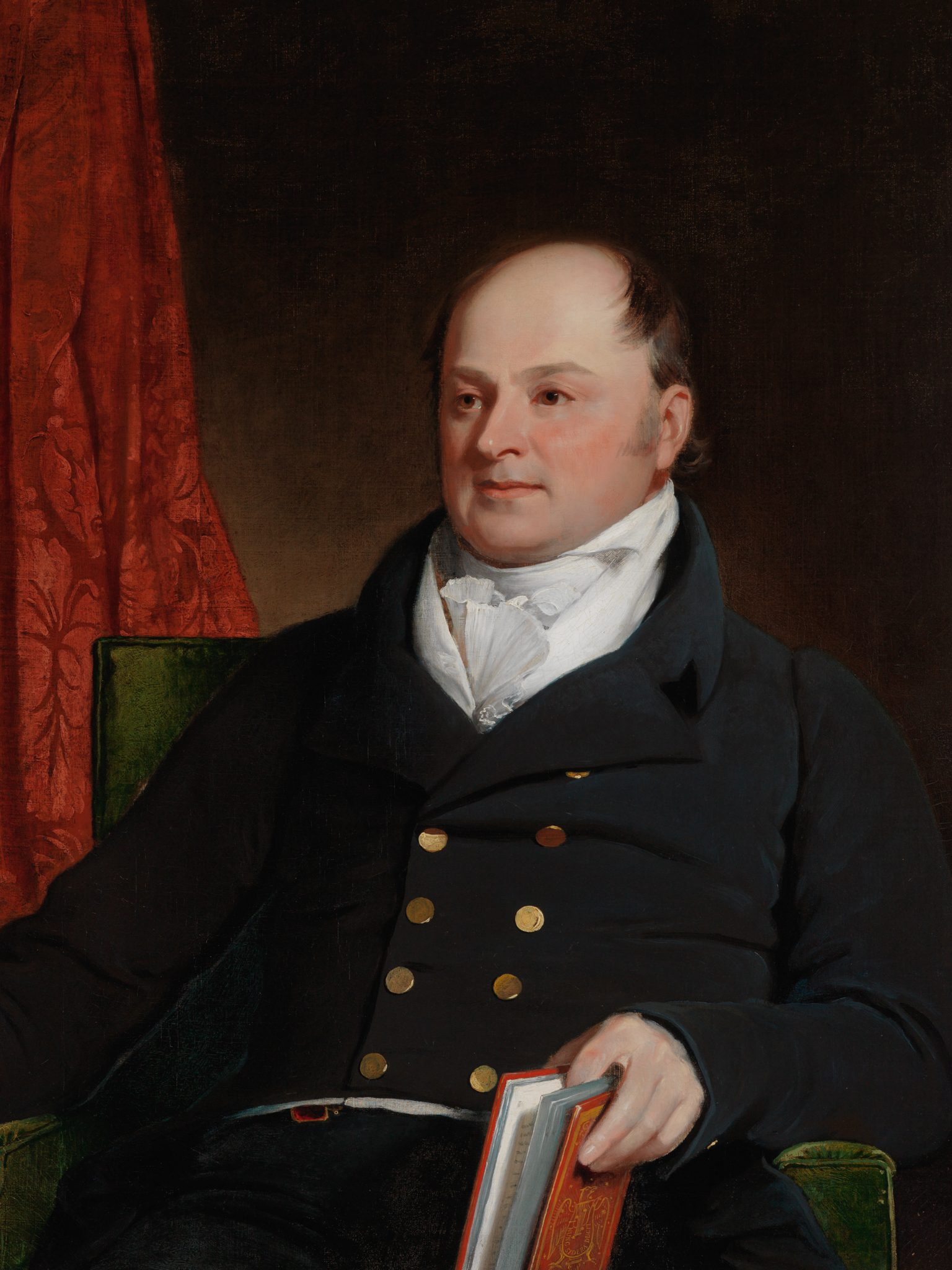
John Quincy Adams.

Following is a list of all Article III United States federal judges appointed by President John Quincy Adams during his presidency. In total Adams appointed 12 Article III federal judges, including 1 Justice to the Supreme Court of the United States and 11 judges to the United States district courts.

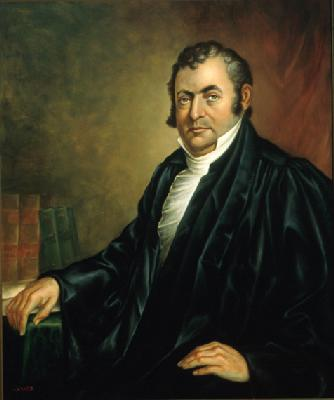
Robert Trimble was the only Supreme Court Justice appointed by John Quincy Adams.

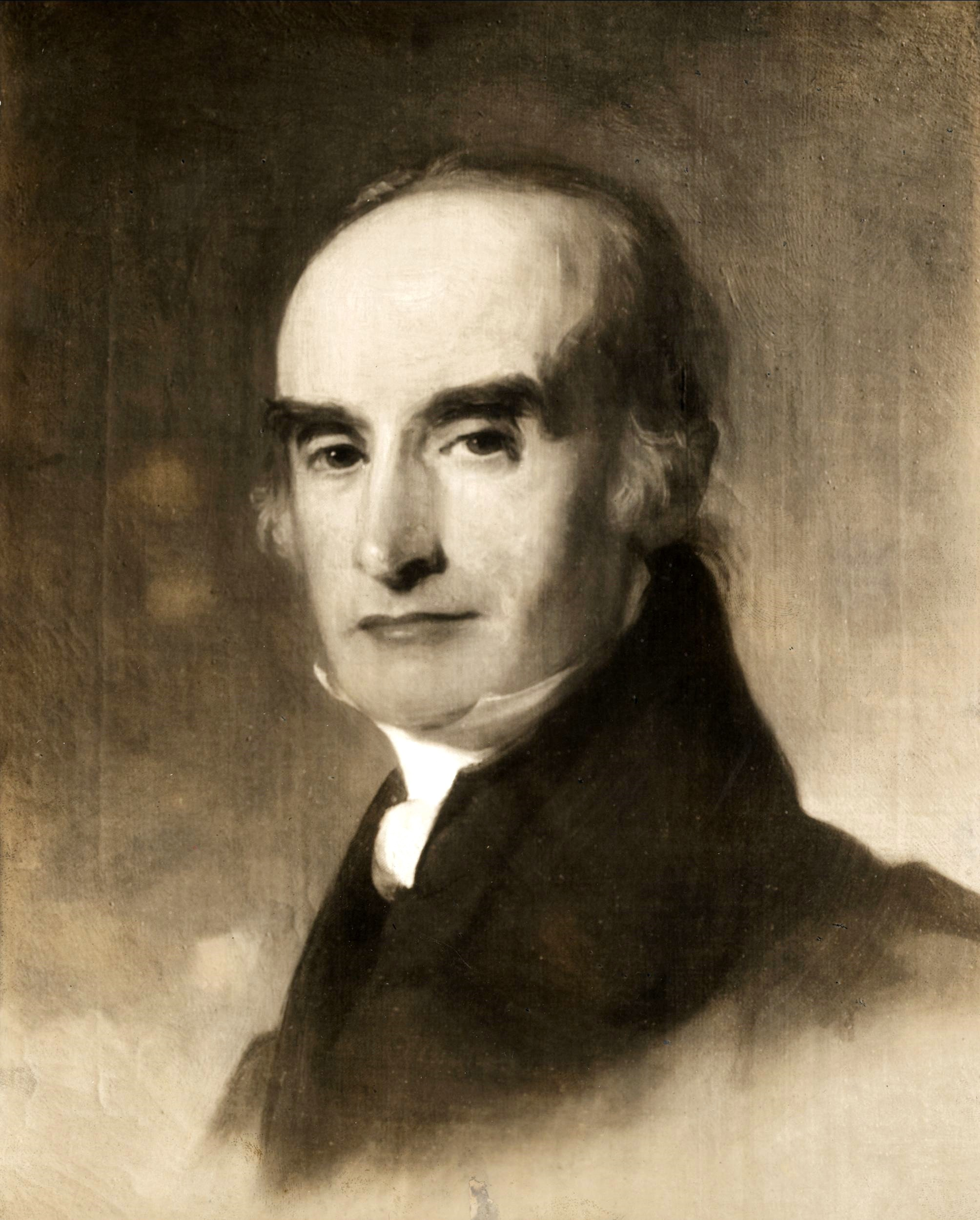
Joseph Hopkinson, appointed by Adams to a district court judgeship in Pennsylvania.

== United States Supreme Court justices ==
#	Justice	Seat	State	Former justice	Nomination date	Confirmation date	Began active service	Ended active service
1	Robert Trimble	6	Kentucky	Thomas Todd	April 11, 1826	May 9, 1826	May 9, 1826	August 25, 1828

== District courts ==
#	Judge	Court (Note: See List of United States district and territorial courts)	Nomination date	Confirmation date	Began active service	Ended active service
1	Philip C. Pendleton	W.D. Va.	–	–	May 6, 1825	July 29, 1825
2	George Hay	E.D. Va.	December 13, 1825	March 31, 1826	July 5, 1825	September 21, 1830
3	Alfred Conkling	N.D.N.Y.	December 13, 1825	December 14, 1825	August 27, 1825	August 25, 1852
4	Alexander Caldwell	W.D. Va.	December 13, 1825	January 3, 1826	October 28, 1826	April 8, 1839
5	William Bristol	D. Conn.	May 15, 1826	May 22, 1826	May 22, 1826	March 7, 1836
6	William Crawford	N.D. Ala. S.D. Ala.	May 5, 1826	May 22, 1826	May 22, 1826	February 28, 1849
7	John Boyle	D. Ky.	December 13, 1826	February 12, 1827	October 20, 1826	January 28, 1834
8	William Rossell	D.N.J.	December 13, 1826	December 19, 1826	November 10, 1826	June 20, 1840
9	Samuel Betts	S.D.N.Y.	December 19, 1826	December 21, 1826	December 21, 1826	April 30, 1867
10	Joseph Hopkinson	E.D. Pa.	December 11, 1828	February 23, 1829	October 23, 1828	January 15, 1842
11	William Creighton Jr.	D. Ohio	December 11, 1828	–	November 1, 1828	March 3, 1829

== Sources ==
- Federal Judicial Center
