= James K. Gibson =

American politician (1812–1879)

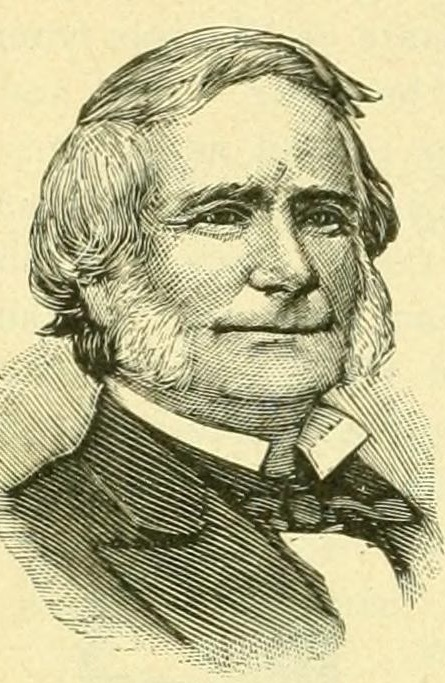

Member of the U.S. House of Representatives from Virginia's 8th district
- In office January 28, 1870 – March 3, 1871
- Preceded by: Alexander Boteler
- Succeeded by: William Terry

Personal details
- Born: James King Gibson; February 18, 1812 Abingdon, Virginia, U.S.
- Died: March 30, 1879 (aged 67) Abingdon, Virginia, U.S.
- Resting place: Sinking Spring Cemetery
- Party: Conservative
- Profession: Politician; merchant; farmer

James King Gibson (February 18, 1812 – March 30, 1879) was a nineteenth-century American politician, merchant, sheriff and banker from Virginia. He served one term in the United States House of Representatives.

== Early life ==
James King Gibson was born in Abingdon, Virginia on February 18, 1812. He attended the common schools as a child. He moved to Huntsville, Alabama in 1833, but moved back to Abingdon in 1834 and engaged in mercantile pursuits.

== Career ==
He was deputy sheriff of Washington County, Virginia in 1834 and 1835 and was appointed postmaster of Abingdon in 1837, serving until 1849. Gibson was elected as a Conservative to the United States House of Representatives in 1869, serving in the 41st U.S. Congress from January 28, 1870, to March 3, 1871. Gibson declined reelection in 1870 and engaged in agricultural pursuits and banking.

== Death ==
Gibson died in Abingdon on March 30, 1879. He was interred there in Sinking Spring Cemetery.

U.S. House of Representatives
Preceded by Alexander Boteler^{(1)}	Member of the U.S. House of Representatives from Virginia's 8th congressional district January 28, 1870 – March 3, 1871	Succeeded by William Terry
Notes and references
1. Because of Virginia's secession, the House seat was vacant for almost nine years before Gibson succeeded Boteler.
