= Philip C. Pendleton =

American judge (1779–1863)

Judge of the United States District Court for the Western District of Virginia
- In office May 6, 1825 – July 29, 1825
- Appointed by: John Quincy Adams
- Preceded by: John G. Jackson
- Succeeded by: Alexander Caldwell

Member of the Virginia House of Delegates from the Berkeley County district
- In office December 4, 1809 – December 2, 1810
- Preceded by: George Porterfield
- Succeeded by: George Porterfield
- In office December 2, 1805 – December 4, 1808
- Preceded by: Elisha Boyd
- Succeeded by: George Porterfield

Personal details
- Born: Philip Clayton Pendleton; November 24, 1779 Martinsburg, Virginia
- Died: April 3, 1863 (aged 83) Martinsburg, West Virginia
- Resting place: Norbourne Parish Cemetery; Martinsburg, West Virginia
- Education: Dickinson College; Princeton University read law

Philip Clayton Pendleton (November 24, 1779 – April 3, 1863) was a Virginia attorney, planter, politician and jurist. He briefly served as a United States district judge of the United States District Court for the Western District of Virginia. He previously served in the Virginia House of Delegates and as a Virginia state judge.

== Education and career ==
Born on November 24, 1779, in Berkeley County, Virginia (now West Virginia), Pendleton attended Dickinson College and the College of New Jersey (now Princeton University), then read law c. 1800. Pendleton was admitted to the Virginia bar around 1800, and had a private practice in what became the Eastern Panhandle of West Virginia at various times when he was not a judge. He also farmed using enslaved labor. In the 1820 United States census, he owned 3 slaves, which number grew to 23 slaves in the 1840 United States census. In the 1860 United States census, Pendleton owned 16 slaves in Berkeley County, Virginia. His firstborn son, also Philip C. Pendleton (1814–1899) farmed across the Potomac River in Oakland, Allegheny County, Maryland before the Civil War with the assistance of 13 enslaved people, then possibly served as a Union major and paymaster during the war.

Meanwhile, Berkeley County voters elected Pendleton as one of their representatives in the Virginia House of Delegates (a part-time position) in 1805 and re-elected him the following year. Although he was not one of the two top vote-getters in 1807, one of the two men elected (Philip P. Wilson) died before the session began and Pendleton succeeded him, then was replaced by George Porterfield for one term, before he and Magnus Tate served together for a term, then Porterfield again replaced Pendleton. Reportedly, his tenure in the Virginia General Assembly led to Pendleton's later aversion to further political involvement. The Virginia General Assembly elected Pendleton as a member of the Board of Commissioners who met at the tavern at Rockfish Gap in 1818 and decided to locate the University of Virginia at Charlottesville. The group also included Thomas Jefferson, James Madison, James Monroe, John Marshall and among others, John G. Jackson, another future judge of the United States District Court for the Western District of Virginia. (Pendleton's vote was for Lexington).

== Military service ==
Pendleton served in the War of 1812, enlisting as a private in the militia company raised by fellow lawyer and planter Elisha Boyd in Martinsburg, Virginia (now West Virginia). He became the unit's paymaster. Their troop of Berkeley County militia defended Norfolk and Portsmouth Virginia against a British naval and land attack. Another Berkeley County militia troop would be the first to reach Washington, D.C. after the British burned the new nation's capitol.

== Federal judicial service ==
Pendleton received a recess appointment from President John Quincy Adams on May 6, 1825, to a seat on the United States District Court for the Western District of Virginia vacated by Judge John G. Jackson. His service terminated on July 29, 1825, due to his resignation. His resignation was due to his unwillingness to undertake the rigors of constantly riding between courthouses in his district. Due to the briefness of his tenure, his nomination was never submitted to the United States Senate.

== Later career ==
In 1829, voters from Berkeley County as well as from nearby Hampshire, Hardy and Morgan Counties voters elected Pendleton one of their representatives to the Virginia Constitutional Convention of 1829-1830 (together with his father in law Elisha Boyd, William Naylor and William Donaldson).

The Virginia General Assembly elected Pendleton as a judge for the County Court for Berkeley County, and he served for many years as chief judge of that court until his death. On June 2, 1842, Pendleton and fellow politicians Magnus Tate, C.J. Faulkner, Edmund P. Hunter and D.H. Conrad extended hospitality in Martinsburg to members of Baltimore's City Council who traveled to Hancock, Maryland through Harpers Ferry on the newly completed B&O Railroad line. A "first class" railway station was completed for Martinsburg 1849 and the city became the terminus of a turnpike from Winchester in 1954 and the Cumberland Valley Railroad in 1856.

== Death ==
Pendleton died on April 3, 1863, in Berkeley County, Virginia. He was interred in Norbourne Parish Cemetery in Martinsburg.

== Family ==
Pendleton was descended from the First Families of Virginia, the eldest son of Colonel Philip Pendleton (1752–1829) who led the Berkeley County militia during the American Revolutionary War and helped found Martinsburg in 1778. In 1813, Pendleton married Sarah Ann Boyd (1797–1868), Elisha Boyd's daughter. Their son Edmund B. Pendleton (1816–1880) would follow his father's path in law and politics into the Virginia judiciary, serving one term in the Virginia House of Delegates from 1844 to 1845, as well as twice voting against secession twice as one of Berkeley County's delegates at the Virginia Secession Convention of 1861. Pendleton and his wife Sarah also had sons Philip Pendleton (1814–1899) and Dr. Elisha Boyd Pendleton (1820–1902), and a daughter, Elizabeth who married and had children.

== Edmund B. Pendleton ==
Berkeley County had not sent any representatives to the Wheeling Conventions which helped create the new state, and several of his relatives served in the Confederate States Army. His son Edmund B. Pendleton would move from Berkeley County back into Frederick County, Virginia (from which Berkeley county had been created in 1772) and become a Virginia judge from 1869 until resigning a year later and retiring there until his death in 1880, although Virginia's attempts to regain Berkeley County and Jefferson County would be rejected by the United States Supreme Court in Virginia v. West Virginia in 1871.

Legal offices
Preceded by John G. Jackson	Judge of the United States District Court for the Western District of Virginia; 1825	Succeeded by Alexander Caldwell
