= Edgewood (Bunker Hill, West Virginia) =

Historic house in West Virginia, United States

- U.S. National Register of Historic Places
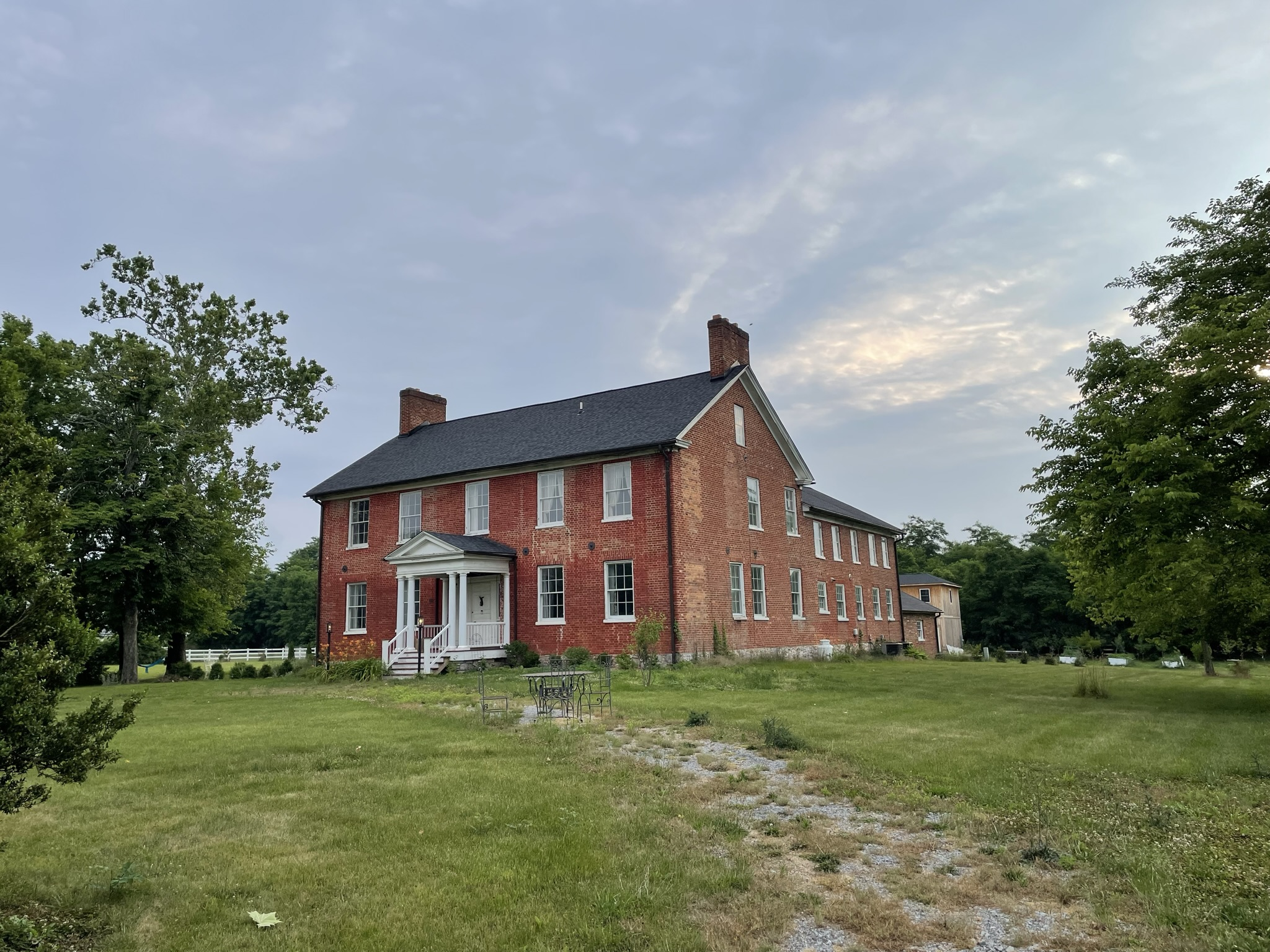

- Location within West Virginia Location within the United States
- Location: 121 Runnymeade Rd., Bunker Hill, West Virginia
- Coordinates: 39°19′49″N 78°3′29″W
- Area: 13.59 acres (5.50 ha)
- Built: 1839
- Architect: Gen. Elisha Boyd
- Architectural style: Greek Revival
- MPS: Berkeley County MRA
- NRHP reference No.: 80004431
- Added to NRHP: December 10, 1980

Edgewood, also known as the John Boyd House, is a historic home located at Bunker Hill, Berkeley County, West Virginia. It was built in 1839 and is a two-story, five-bay, brick dwelling with a gable roof in the Greek Revival style. The entrance features a semi-elliptical transom and sidelights. The building has a two-story rear ell. The property includes a small log slave cabin.

The house was built by General Elisha Boyd for his son John as the plantation house for the 1,400 acre Edgewood Manor plantation. During the American Civil War, John Boyd served in the Confederate Army and was captured when he visited home. He was nearly executed, but for the intervention of President Zachary Taylor's daughter, Mrs. Dandridge. Also during the war, General Stonewall Jackson camped on the lawn. Confederate General J. Johnston Pettigrew (July 4, 1828 – July 17, 1863) died in an upstairs bedroom at Edgewood after having been shot at Falling Waters during the retreat from the Battle of Gettysburg.

The Boyd family lost the house after the Civil War, but many subsequent owners maintained it. It was listed on the National Register of Historic Places in 1980, as was the nearby John Drinker House, which may have served as a stop on the Underground Railroad.

== See also ==
- Boydville
- Bunker Hill Historic District
