= Charles James Faulkner =

American politician (1847–1929)

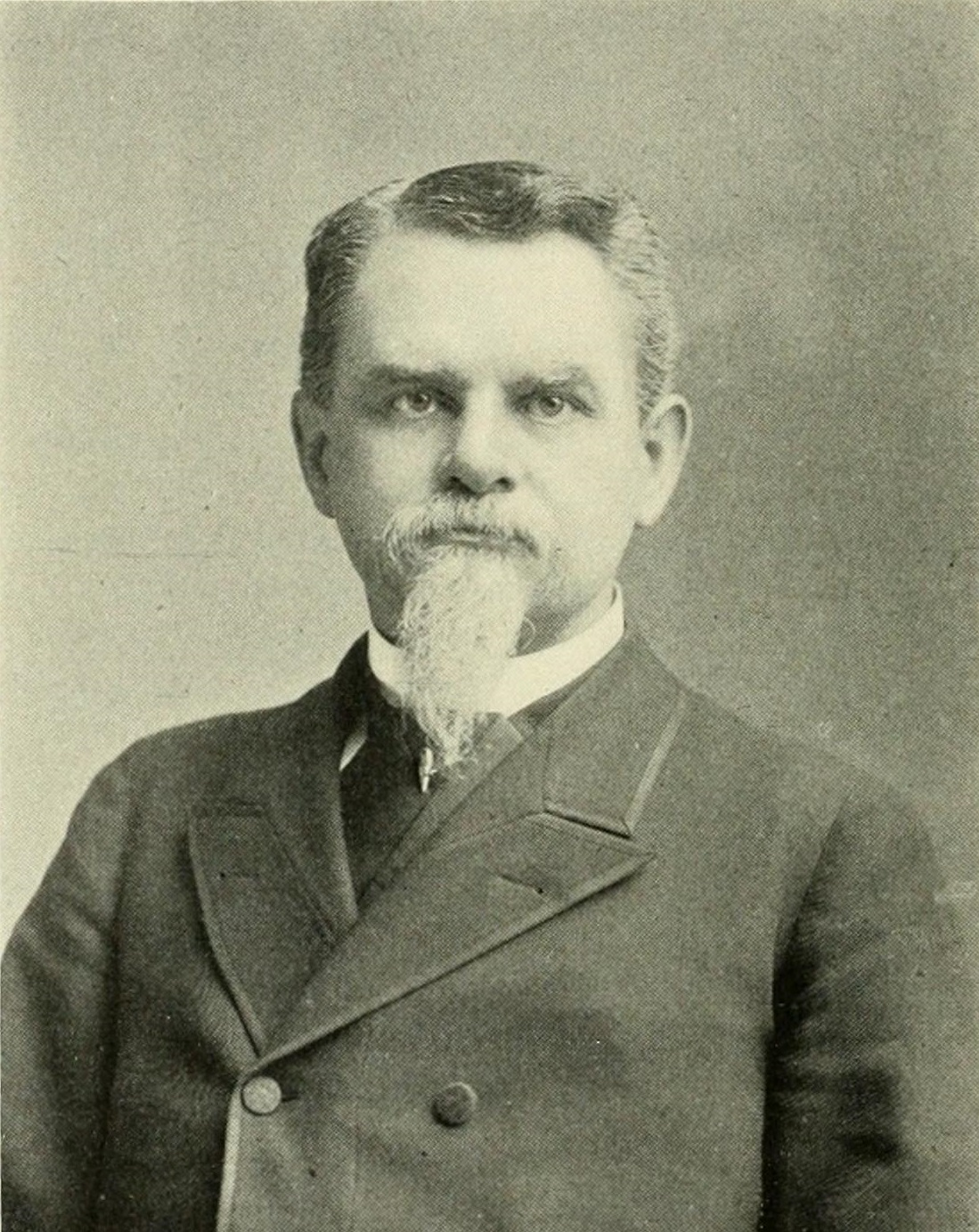
- Faulkner in 1899
- In office March 4, 1887 – March 3, 1899
- Preceded by: Johnson N. Camden
- Succeeded by: Nathan B. Scott

Personal details
- Born: September 21, 1847 Martinsburg, Virginia, U.S. (now West Virginia)
- Died: January 13, 1929 (aged 81) Martinsburg, West Virginia, U.S.
- Resting place: Old Norbourne Cemetery; Martinsburg, West Virginia, U.S.
- Party: Democratic
- Parent: Charles James Faulkner Sr. (father)
- Relatives: Virginia Faulkner McSherry (sister)
- Education: University of Virginia

Charles James Faulkner (September 21, 1847 – January 13, 1929) was a United States senator from West Virginia.

== Early life ==
Charles James Faulkner was born on the family estate, Boydville, in Martinsburg, Virginia (now West Virginia). His father was Charles James Faulkner Sr., a U.S. Representative from Virginia and West Virginia and U.S. Minister to France.

He accompanied his father to France 1859; he attended school in Paris and Switzerland. He returned to the United States in 1861, and during the Civil War entered the Virginia Military Institute at Lexington in 1862. He served with the cadets in the Battle of New Market.

After the war, he attended the law department of the University of Virginia at Charlottesville, graduating in 1868. At the University of Virginia, he was member of St. Anthony Hall.

== Career ==
He was admitted to the bar in 1868 and commenced practice in Martinsburg.

In 1887, Faulkner was elected as a Democrat to the U.S. Senate; he was reelected in 1893 and served from March 4, 1887, to March 3, 1899. While in the Senate, he was chairman of the Committee on Territories (Fifty-third Congress). In 1898 he was appointed a member of the International Joint High Commission of the United States and Great Britain.

He retired from public life and devoted his time to the practice of law in Martinsburg and Washington, D.C., and to the management of his agricultural interests.

== Personal ==
In 1922, he served as first president of the Opequon Golf Club.

Faulkner died at the Boydville family estate on January 13, 1929; interment was in the Old Norbourne Cemetery, Martinsburg.

U.S. Senate
| Preceded by Johnson N. Camden | U.S. senator (Class 1) from West Virginia; March 4, 1887 – March 3, 1899; Served alongside: John E. Kenna, Johnson N. Camden, Stephen B. Elkins | Succeeded by Nathan B. Scott |
