= Opequon Golf Club =

- U.S. National Register of Historic Places
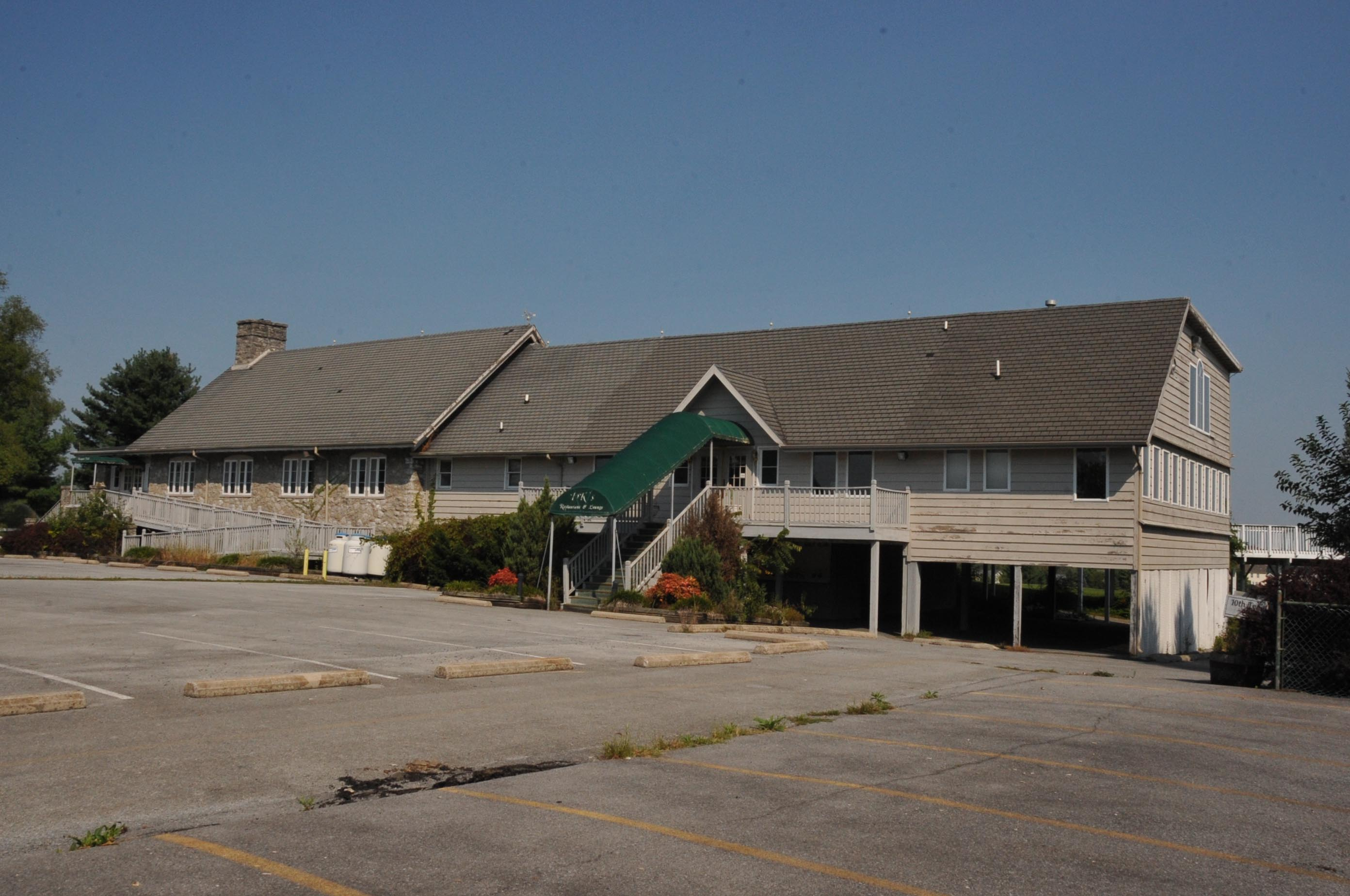

- Location within West Virginia Location within the United States
- Location: Golf Club Rd. E of Opequon Creek, Martinsburg, West Virginia
- Coordinates: 39°26′30″N 77°55′19″W
- Area: less than one acre
- Built: 1922
- Architect: Harding, Clarence Lowell; et al.
- Architectural style: Bungalow/Craftsman, Adirondack Lodge Style
- NRHP reference No.: 95000417
- Added to NRHP: April 28, 1995

Opequon Golf Club, also known as the Stonebridge Golf Club and Martinsburg Golf Club, is a historic country club clubhouse located at Martinsburg, Berkeley County, West Virginia. The clubhouse was built in 1922, and is a one-story, Adirondack Lodge Style stone building with a wraparound porch on the north and west sides. It has a steep gable roof with a chimney at the west end. The porches have hip roofs and feature exposed rafter ends and stone columns. It sits on a raised basement. The building was added to on the east end in 1955. West Virginia Senator Charles James Faulkner (1847 - 1929) was a founding member and served as first president of the Opequon Golf Club.

It was listed on the National Register of Historic Places in 1995.
