= Alexander Caldwell (Virginia judge) =

American judge (1774–1839)

Judge of the United States District Court for the Western District of Virginia
- In office October 28, 1825 – April 8, 1839
- Appointed by: John Quincy Adams
- Preceded by: Philip C. Pendleton
- Succeeded by: Isaac S. Pennybacker

Personal details
- Born: Alexander Caldwell; November 1, 1774 Province of New Jersey, British America
- Died: April 8, 1839 (aged 64) Wheeling, Virginia
- Education: read law

Alexander Caldwell (November 1, 1774 – April 8, 1839) was a United States district judge of the United States District Court for the Western District of Virginia.

== Education and career ==
Born on November 1, 1774, in the Province of New Jersey, British America, Caldwell read law in 1816. He entered private practice in Westville, Pennsylvania from 1816 to 1818. He continued private practice in the Missouri Territory from 1818 to 1820, and in Wheeling, Virginia (now West Virginia) from 1820 to 1826.

== Federal judicial service ==
Caldwell received a recess appointment from President John Quincy Adams on October 28, 1825, to a seat on the United States District Court for the Western District of Virginia vacated by Judge Phillip C. Pendleton. He was nominated to the same position by President Adams on December 13, 1825. He was confirmed by the United States Senate on January 3, 1826, and received his commission the same day. His service terminated on April 8, 1839, due to his death in Wheeling, Virginia. He was succeeded by Judge Isaac S. Pennybacker.

== Family ==
Caldwell was the son of James Caldwell (1724–1804) and his wife Elizabeth. Irish gentry whose name reflected Castle Caldwell established in Ulster Plantation a century earlier, they had emigrated with nine children to Maryland in 1769 and then moved to what became Wheeling in what was then Virginia in 1772. During their sea voyage, Elizabeth Caldwell gave birth to Samuel Caldwell, and in Baltimore she bore James Caldwell (1770–1838, later of St. Clairsville, Ohio and President of the Merchants' and ^Mechanics' Bank of Wheeling, as well as United States Representative from Ohio), then Susana Caldwell (b. 1772), this Alexander Caldwell, and Joseph Caldwell (b. 1777). James Caldwell the elder became a Virginia justice of the peace and militia leader in the developing rural area, and his son/Alexander's brother John Caldwell helped erect Fort Henry to defend the new settlement against Native American raiders.

== Sources ==
Legal offices
Preceded by Philip C. Pendleton	Judge of the United States District Court for the Western District of Virginia; 1825–1839	Succeeded by Isaac S. Pennybacker
