= Alexander Boteler =

American politician

Alexander Robinson Boteler
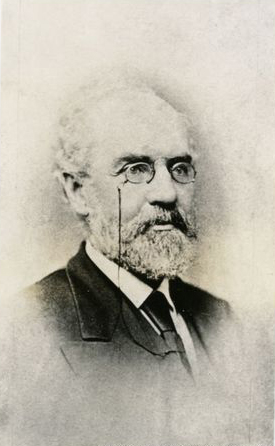
- Photograph of Boteler, c. 1870

Member of the U.S. House of Representatives from Virginia's 8th district
- In office March 4, 1859 – March 3, 1861
- Preceded by: Charles J. Faulkner
- Succeeded by: James K. Gibson

Representative to the Provisional Confederate Congress from Virginia
- In office February 4, 1861 – February 17, 1862
- Preceded by: Position established
- Succeeded by: Position abolished

Member of the Confederate States House of Representatives from Virginia
- In office February 18, 1862 – February 17, 1864
- Preceded by: Position established
- Succeeded by: Frederick W. M. Holliday

Personal details
- Born: May 16, 1815 Shepherdstown, Virginia, US
- Died: May 8, 1892 (aged 76) Shepherdstown, West Virginia, US
- Resting place: Elmwood Cemetery, Shepherdstown, West Virginia
- Party: Opposition
- Spouse: Helen Stockton Boteler
- Education: Princeton College (1835)
- Occupation: Politician, Clerk

Military service
- Allegiance: Confederate States of America
- Branch/service: Confederate States Army
- Rank: Colonel
- Battles/wars: American Civil War

Alexander Robinson Boteler (May 16, 1815 – May 8, 1892) was a nineteenth-century planter turned businessman, as well as artist, writer, lawyer, Confederate officer, philanthropist and politician from Shepherdstown in what was initially Virginia and became West Virginia in the American Civil War.

== Early life and education ==
Born in Shepherdstown, Virginia (now West Virginia) in 1815, to the former Helen Robinson and her husband Dr. Henry Boteler. Alexander Boteler's maternal great-grandfather was the painter, soldier and naturalist Charles Willson Peale. Boteler's mother died when he was five years old, and his father sent him to Baltimore to be raised by his grandfather, merchant Alexander Robinson until he was eleven. He received a private education suitable for his class, even meeting General Lafayette during his tour of the United States. Boteler graduated from Princeton College in 1835, then returned to Virginia.

In 1836 in New Jersey, Alexander Boteler married Helen Macomb Stockton, and they had a son Alexander Boteler Jr. (1842-1893; who attended the University of Virginia and had a stammer) and several daughters: Elizabeth Stockton Shepherd (1837-1866; whose husband architect Rezin Davis Shepherd died in 1862), Angelica Peale Boteler Didier (1839-1912; widow of Henry Didier); Helen Macomb Boteler Pendleton (1840–1914; wife of C.S.A. Capt. Dudley Digges Pendleton) and Charlotte Boteler Johnson (1844–1899; widow of George M. Johnson). His younger brother Henry Boteler (1817-1847) who married Anne Harris Morgan and whose sons Henry Boteler and Charles Peale Boteler would volunteer with the Rockbridge artillery, soon joined by their cousin Alexander Boteler Jr. (who had originally enlisted in the 2nd Virginia Infantry as a private, but became a lieutenant with the Rockbridge Artillery and later served as ordinance officer at various places. They all survived the war despite being wounded several times.

== Career ==
When Dr. Boteler, his father, died in 1836, Alexander Boteler inherited a plantation and house ("Fountain Rock") and significant debts, which he paid off with the assistance of his wife's inheritance as well as his grandfather Robinson. Boteler also throughout his life championed the new steamboat technology (which he witnessed as a boy on the Potomac River at Shepherdstown), and the inventor James Rumsey. His father and George Reynolds had also built a cement mill, crushing limestone common in the area for use building the Chesapeake and Ohio Canal nearby, as well as buildings in Washington D.C. and Georgetown downriver (or down the canal). Henry Boteler sold his interest to his partner in 1835, but Alexander Boteler would buy the mill from Reynolds in 1846, and operate it until August 1861, when it was destroyed by Union forces.

Boteler became known as a progressive farmer, using a "wheat cutter" to harvest his major crop, as well as hotbeds to start market crops. He also had livestock and experimented with grafting varieties of fruit and nut trees. Boteler helped found the Jefferson County Agricultural Society and became its president in 1850. He lectured on farming techniques at the Ohio State Agricultural Fair, the Shenandoah Valley Agricultural Society, and the Agricultural Society of Hagerstown, Maryland. In 1840, Boteler owned 13 slaves, which number grew by 1860 only to 15 slaves (all but three of them adults). This was in part due to his signing a $20,000 note for a friend, who defaulted, so that about half of Boteler's plantation was sold in 1852. Furthermore, he financially backed the Chesapeake and Ohio Canal, although traffic on the canal decreased as the Baltimore and Ohio Railroad completed track first to Martinsburg, then reached Wheeling, West Virginia, in 1853. Boteler was also an artist and author. He published an illustrated book, My Ride to the Barbecue in 1860 about a major civic event that he had hosted on September 11, 1858 (probably in conjunction with his political campaign described below), which reportedly had been attended by 5,000 people.

=== Politics and John Brown's Raid ===
Boteler was fascinated by politics and was a member of several small and short-lived political parties. He briefly was the national secretary of the Know Nothing Party, and at other times a member of the Whigs (a delegate to the Richmond convention and presidential elector in 1852), and in 1860 became the national secretary of the Constitutional Union Party. He unsuccessfully ran as a Whig against incumbent Congressman Charles J. Faulkner (a Democrat) in 1853 and 1855, but he defeated Faulkner in 1858 (Faulkner successfully ran against former Congressman William Lucas in 1857). Accounts of Boteler's party affiliation vary: from "Opposition" to a member of the American Party (which was nativist and related to the Know Nothings) or as a Whig.

During John Brown's raid on Harpers Ferry, upon hearing from one of his daughters of a possible insurrection, Boteler hurried from his home ten miles down to Harpers Ferry, where he interviewed and sketched the rebel, among others.

Boteler represented Virginia's 8th congressional district in the United States House of Representatives from 1859 until resigning after Virginia voted for secession in April 1861. In a widely acclaimed speech as the House was organized in January 1860, Boteler declared himself for Union, as well as decried abolitionism and those who supported John Brown's raid, accusing them of encouraging the bloodbath that he had witnessed at Harpers Ferry. In March 1861, Boteler met the newly elected President Abraham Lincoln and attempted to lobby him against a use-of-force bill. He would resign about a month later.

=== American Civil War ===
At the outbreak of the Civil War, Boteler sympathized with Virginia and his family's way of life. He enlisted in the Confederate Army and received a colonel's commission. However, he often noted his delicate constitution and did relatively little soldiering, unlike his son, who enlisted in the Rockbridge Artillery.

In 1861, Boteler was chosen by the Virginia Convention to be a representative to the Provisional Confederate Congress. Later that year, Jefferson County voters and others in Virginia's 10th Congressional District elected Boteler as a Democrat [sic] to represent Virginia's 10th District in the Confederate States House of Representatives. Boteler was a member of the three-man committee that designed the Confederate government's seal, which featured an image of George Washington. He failed to win re-election in 1864, losing to disabled Confederate veteran (and future Virginia governor) Frederick W.M. Holliday.

Meanwhile, Boteler's neighbor, William Augustine Morgan, had led the Shepherdstown Cavalry for several years (including responding to the 1859 John Brown raid). Morgan also became a Confederate colonel early in the war, and would fight many battles, including under Generals Jackson and Stuart, and not capitulate at the war's end. Boteler's son fought in the First Battle of Bull Run in July 1861.

Less than a month later, Union troops arrested Alexander Boteler at his home, "Fountain Rock" outside Shepardstown and imprisoned him across the river. He convinced his captors to release him, but Union troops burned his cement mill on August 19, 1861, as an alleged snipers' nest. The "Pleasant Valley" area was often contested; various troops would burn his plantation's fields many times during the conflict, and Union forces would captured four Confederate cannons in the mill ruins following the Battle of Antietam. The cement mill also would figure in the Battle of Shepherdstown in September 1862. Fountain Rock became a hospital for soldiers wounded at the Battle of Antietam, and also experience fighting in July 1863.

His major contribution to the Confederacy was political. In November 1861, Confederate papers publicized his escape from Union raiders at Fountain Rock, and his wife's outrage at the Yankee action. The following spring, Boteler convinced General Thomas J. "Stonewall" Jackson not to return to VMI, then continued on Jackson's staff as a courier or liaison until the general's death. Boteler returned to Richmond and his legislative duties. Then, in August 1863, he volunteered to serve on the staff of General J. E. B. Stuart (where he continued to serve until that general's death).

In February 1864, on General Stuart's recommendation, Boteler became a military judge, and remained such for the remainder of the war. In July 1864, Union troops (following orders of Union General David Hunter during the final campaign against rebel sympathizers) looted and burned Fountain Rock, although only occupied by Boteler's wife, daughters and grandchildren. They had spent part of the war in Baltimore, and Lettie in particular was a fervent Confederate supporter. Fountain Rock was one of several plantations ordered destroyed: the homes of Andrew Hunter near Charles Town and "Bedford", the home of Edmund J. Lee (cousin of the Confederate general) were also burned per that order, although the home of Charles J. Faulkner in Martinsburg would be spared based on the entreaties of his wife and Union-allied relatives.

On April 25, 1865, Boteler wrote his wife about his attempt to return to Petersburg on April 2, 1865, then receiving a parole from Grant at Appomattox Court House on April 9, falling ill during his journey to devastated Richmond (feeling "utterly lost and bewildered in the midst of ruins which extend as far as the eye can reach"), and being unable to return home via the railroad from Baltimore because of Lincoln's assassination.

=== Postwar years ===
After the war, in 1867, Boteler's cement mill was sold at auction because he lacked funds to rebuild it (having invested in Confederate war bonds). Rebuilt by investors, it remained in operation until 1901.

Living in Shepherdstown, Boteler remained active in his community. He led projects to bring the Shenandoah Valley Railroad to Shepardstown, as well as to connect his hometown by telegraph to the wider world. In 1871, Boteler helped found Shepherd College, in the vacant building built by his late son-in-law that Shepherdstown had hoped would remain the county courthouse (Charles Town regained the county seat after considerable litigation). Boteler benefited from legislation restoring political rights to Confederates in June 1872, and then unsuccessfully ran for Congress as an Independent in 1872 and 1874.

Boteler also continued to write and sketch, although his books about James Rumsey and about temperance were never published. He traveled widely, speaking at Confederate reunions, which delighted in his tales about Stonewall Jackson and J.E.B. Stuart as well as John Brown's raid. In 1883, Boteler responded to a speech by Frederick Douglass at the dedication of Storer College in Harpers Ferry by publishing an article about his experience of that raid in Century Magazine. A decade later, the Boston Military History Society bought some of his sketches. His account of Stonewall Jackson's campaign in 1862 was published posthumously by the Southern Historical Society.

Appointed West Virginia's representative to the Centennial Commission in 1873, Botler was later appointed a member of the Tariff Commission by President Chester A. Arthur (which caused him to travel widely in 1882-1884). He also was employed as a pardon clerk in the Department of Justice by Attorney General Benjamin H. Brewster, serving until 1889.

In 1885, the Morgans Grove Agricultural Association held a fair on the property of his neighbor William A. Morgan. The Shenandoah Valley Railroad built a stop for the event, which was a great success. The fair continued annually, becoming a four-day event, and, in June 1889, the association bought Boteler's Fountain Rock property, moved some fair buildings onto it, then constructed a wooden pavilion in 1890.

== Death and legacy ==
Boteler died in Shepherdstown, West Virginia, on May 8, 1892. Duke University's library holds the Boteler family's papers. His diary is in the William Elizabeth Brooks Collection in the Library of Congress.

The ruins of Boteler's cement mill still exist and were bought in 2011 by a coalition of government and nonprofit groups, with the intention of adding that site to the Antietam National Battlefield Park. The former site of "Fountain Head" overlooking the Potomac River became the site for the gazebo in Morgans Grove Park. Only the spring house (constructed by his father in 1831) remains from Boteler's lifetime. The fairs continued annually after Boteler sold the acreage in 1889, but came on hard times in 1931, so the property was sold to a farmer circa 1941. The Shepherdstown Men's Club bought 20 acres in 1961 for use as a civic park; a gazebo was built on the overlook where the Fountain Head manor house had once stood. Shepherd College in 1952 erected a male residence hall and named it for Boteler, but it was demolished in 1990 when asbestos was discovered.

== See also ==
- Morgan's Grove

U.S. House of Representatives
| Preceded by Charles J. Faulkner | Member of the U.S. House of Representatives from Virginia's 8th congressional district March 4, 1859 – March 3, 1861 | Succeeded by James K. Gibson^{(1)} |
Confederate States House of Representatives
| New office | Representative to the Provisional; Confederate Congress from Virginia; 1861–1862 | Office abolished |
| New office | Member of the C.S. House of Representatives from Virginia; February 18, 1862 – February 17, 1864 | Succeeded by Frederick W.M. Holliday |
Notes and references
1. Because of Virginia's secession and controversy over Jefferson County's status resolved in Virginia v. West Virginia(1871), the House seat was vacant for almost nine years before Gibson succeeded Boteler.
