= James E. Stewart (politician) =

American politician

Member of the Virginia House of Delegates from Berkeley County

Delegate, judge
- In office December 6, 1847-December 3, 1848 Serving with Thomas Brown
- Preceded by: William Boak
- Succeeded by: Charles J. Faulkner

Personal details
- Born: December 9, 1814 Berkeley County, Virginia, U.S.
- Died: 1890 (aged 75–76) Virginia, U.S.
- Education: Washington and Jefferson College
- Occupation: Lawyer

James E. Stewart (December 9, 1814 – July 18, 1890) was a nineteenth-century American politician from Virginia.

== Early and family life ==
Stewart was born in Berkeley County, Virginia in 1814. He graduated from Washington and Jefferson College further along the National Road in Washington, Pennsylvania, then studied law in Baltimore, Maryland.

== Career ==
The Virginia Capitol at Richmond VA where 19th century Conventions met

After admission to the bar, Stewart practiced law in various counties in what later became known as the Eastern Panhandle of West Virginia. Berkeley County voters elected Stewart as one of their (part-time) representatives In the Virginia House of Delegates in 1847. He served alongside veteran Thomas Brown, but in 1848 voters instead elected veteran lawyer-delegate Charles J. Faulkner and William L. Boak (who were both in turn replaced in 1849).

In 1850, voters in Frederick, Hampshire and Morgan counties elected Stewart as one of their four delegates to the Virginia Constitutional Convention of 1850. He served alongside veteran Thomas Sloan, Richard E. Byrd and Charles Blue.

Following a two-year stint as editor of the Martinsburg Virginia (WV) Gazette, Stewart held a job in the Federal Government in Washington, DC until the outbreak of the American Civil War.

During the American Civil War in 1863, Stewart relocated to Page County, Virginia. There he published the weekly Page Courier in 1870, He was elected a county judge in 1873, and he held the position for many years.

== Death ==
James E. Stewart died in Virginia on July 18, 1890.

== Bibliography ==
- Pulliam, David Loyd (1901). The Constitutional Conventions of Virginia from the foundation of the Commonwealth to the present time. John T. West, Richmond. ISBN 978-1-2879-2059-5.
- Swem, Earl Greg (1918). A Register of the General Assembly of Virginia, 1776-1918, and of the Constitutional Conventions. David Bottom, Superintendent of Public Printing. ISBN 978-1-3714-6242-0.
