= John R. Cooke =

Virginia planter, lawyer and politician

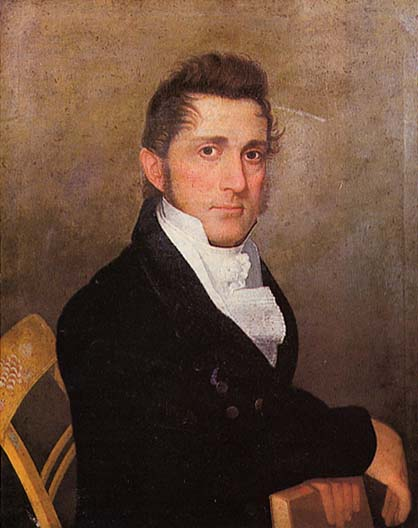
- portrait by Cephas Thompson, c. 1810

Member of the Virginia House of Delegates from the Berkeley County, Virginia district
- In office October 10, 1814 – December 3, 1815 Serving with George Newkirk
- Preceded by: Elisha Boyd
- Succeeded by: Andrew Waggonner

Personal details
- Born: June 17, 1788 Bermuda
- Died: December 15, 1854 (aged 66) Richmond, Virginia
- Spouse: Maria Pendleton
- Profession: lawyer, planter, politician

John Rogers Cooke (June 17, 1788 – December 15, 1854) was an immigrant from Britain's Caribbean colonies who became a prominent Virginia lawyer, as well as planter, author and politician. He served a single term in the Virginia House of Delegates and became a key delegate in the Virginia Constitutional Convention of 1829-1830.

== Early and family life ==
Born in Bermuda to physician Stephen Cooke and his wife Catherine Esten, his family emigrated to Grand Turk Island in the Bahamas before moving to Alexandria, Virginia in 1791, then further westward to Leesburg, the Loudoun County seat before 1801. John Rogers Cooke received a private education appropriate to his class, and various family traditions have him studying either at the College of William and Mary or at the College of New Jersey (now known as Princeton University). However, neither college has records of his attendance. His younger brother Philip St. George Cooke became a career U.S. Army officer, author of its cavalry manual, and Union brigadier general during the American Civil War not long after this man's death.

=== Military service ===
In 1807, at age nineteen, he served as an officer in the Frederick militia that marched to the seaboard when the USS Chesapeake (1799) was fired upon by HMS Leopard. Cooke served at least several months in 1813 as a private in a Berkeley County volunteer artillery company attached to the 67th regiment Virginia militia which defended Norfolk during the War of 1812. Thus he served under Capt. James Faulkner and later Capt. Robert Wilson, and the battalion was led by Major Andrew Waggoner and Col. Elisha Boyd.

=== Personal life ===
On November 18, 1813, Cooke married into the First Families of Virginia. He and his wife Maria Pendleton, daughter of Col. Philip Pendleton, would have 13 children, of whom two sons and four daughters reached adulthood. Although educated as lawyers, Philip Pendleton Cooke and John Esten Cooke would achieve distinction as writers, the latter also becoming a Confederate soldier.

== Career ==
Cooke was admitted to the Virginia bar, and by January 9, 1809 he was practicing law in Martinsburg. In 1814 Cooke and George Newkirk represented Berkeley County in the Virginia House of Delegates. Cooke sat on the Committees for Courts of Justice and of Propositions and Grievances. However, neither man was re-elected to that part time position.

Cooke then returned to Martinsburg and his successful law practices in western Virginia, but moved his home eastward across the Appalachian mountains to Frederick County and its county seat, Winchester (also the northern gateway to the Shenandoah Valley and location of the chancery court for western Virginia) in 1824. For a time he lived at "Ambler's Hill," a plantation near Winchester. Cooke remained politically active and sought to reform the state constitution which heavily favored Tidewater Virginia. In 1816 Cooke helped organize a political convention for western Virginia that met in Staunton, the gateway to the middle of the Shenandoah Valley. Although Cooke was not a delegate to that first western reform convention, he represented Frederick County at another western reform convention that met in Staunton in July and August 1825. Cooke anonymously published two pamphlets, The Constitution of '76(1825) and The Convention Question in 1827 (1827), both of which argued for reapportionment of the Virginia General Assembly based upon universal manhood suffrage only for Virginia's white population (whereas the previous formula which counted non-voting slaves as 3/5 of white voters favored Tidewater planters). After the Virginia General Assembly agreed to hold a constitutional convention in 1828, Cooke published An Earnest Appeal to the Friends of Reform in the Legislature of Virginia (1828). Cooke was elected as a delegate to the Virginia Constitutional Convention of 1829-1830. He was elected by the convention to serve on the Committee on the Legislative Department, and he served on the Committee of Seven that drafted the Constitution of 1830. He was one of four delegates elected from the senatorial district made up his home district of Frederick, and Jefferson County.

Cooke became the highest vote-getter of the 14 candidates for the four seats from the district encompassing Frederick and Jefferson Counties in that convention. At the convention, he became one of the leading spokesmen for reform, along with Philip Doddridge. Whereas Doddridge advocated apportioning both the state house and senate based upon the white population, Cooke accepted a compromise that apportioned the state senate using the old formula, as well as slightly increased suffrage by reducing but not eliminating the property qualification for voters. Cooke was one of the seven members who drafted the new state constitution and was the only one of the reformers from the Shenandoah Valley and trans-Allegheny region to vote for the new document. Accused of having deserted westerners' interests, Cooke defended himself by writing letters to the editors of various Virginia newspapers. He argued that the Shenandoah Valley had fewer shared political interests with the trans-Allegheny region than with the western Piedmont counties where he had grown up. Jefferson County voters apparently agreed, overwhelmingly approving the new constitution in a spring referendum (243 to 53), while Frederick County voters approved it by the narrow margin of 451 to 438. In 1835, Cooke ran as the candidate of the new Whig party, but narrowly lost an election to the U.S. House of Representatives from Virginia's 15th congressional district (that no longer exists, but then comprised trans-Allegheny counties) by a vote of 1849 to 1971, even though he narrowly beat the incumbent Edward Lucas in Jefferson County by a 372 to 365 margin. Cooke also fell deeply into debt, in part because of debts owed by his father's estate, as well as his own generosity and the Panic of 1837. His investments in a coal mine as well as Texas land failed. During his political career, Cooke owned enslaved labor. In the 1820 census, he may have owned seven slaves. When he attended the 1829 constitutional convention, Cooke owned six taxable slaves. In the 1840 census, reflecting Cooke's financial troubles mentioned below, his household owned three slaves, a man between 10 and 24 years old and two women between 35 and 55 years old.

By 1832, Cooke had moved to a new estate, "Glengary". A common agricultural practice of the time was to move when the soil lost nutrients because of common farming practices (which under-fertilized and also rarely used crop rotation). However, Glengary burned down in 1838, exacerbating Cooke's financial woes. The family moved to Charles Town, the Jefferson county seat, then in 1840 to Richmond, Virginia.

== Death and legacy ==
Cooke suffered from debilitating fevers in his final years, which some believe may have been malaria. He died in Richmond, Virginia in 1854, and was buried at Shockoe Hill Cemetery.

== Bibliography ==
- Pulliam, David Loyd (1901). The Constitutional Conventions of Virginia from the foundation of the Commonwealth to the present time. John T. West, Richmond. ISBN 978-1-2879-2059-5.
- Proceedings and Debates of the Virginia State Convention of 1829-1830: To which are Subjoined, the New Constitution of Virginia, and the Votes of the People. S. Shepherd & Company. 1830.
