= Boydville Historic District =

Historic district in West Virginia, United States

- U.S. National Register of Historic Places
- U.S. Historic district
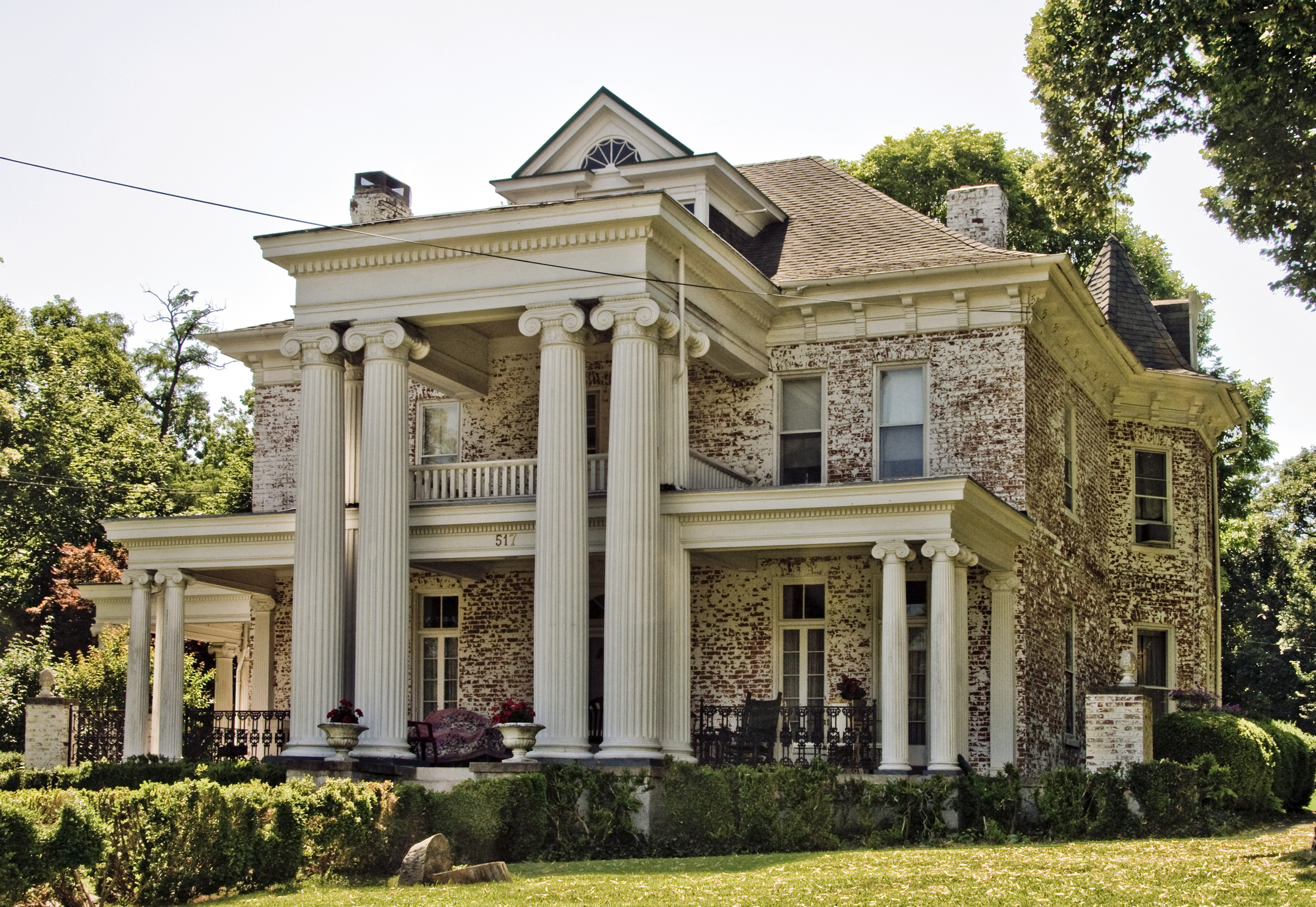

- Location within West Virginia Location within the United States
- Location: Roughly bounded by W. Stephen, S. Spring, and S. Queen Sts., including Boydville grounds, Martinsburg, West Virginia
- Coordinates: 39°27′6″N 77°58′1″W
- Architect: Multiple
- Architectural style: Queen Anne, Federal, Georgian Revival
- MPS: Berkeley County MRA
- NRHP reference No.: 80004413
- Added to NRHP: December 10, 1980

The Boydville Historic District includes an area of Martinsburg, West Virginia that was developed for the well-to-do of Martinsburg at the turn of the twentieth century. The district is named for Boydville, the mansion at the core of the district. The district runs generally along South Queen Street to the south of the Downtown Martinsburg Historic District and to the east of the Boomtown Historic District.

The district is associated with a number of figures from the early history of Martinsburg, including General Elisha Boyd, who owned portions of the area in the 1790s, as well as General Adam Stephen, founder of Martinsburg. The principal building in the area is the Boydville mansion, built about 1812. Other significant buildings include the Public Graded School of 1883, now the headquarters for the Berkeley County Board of Education, the Classical Revival 517 South Queen Street, and the Adam Stephen Monument.

The district was listed on the National Register of Historic Places in 1980.
