= William Augustine Morgan =

19th century planter

William A. Morgan
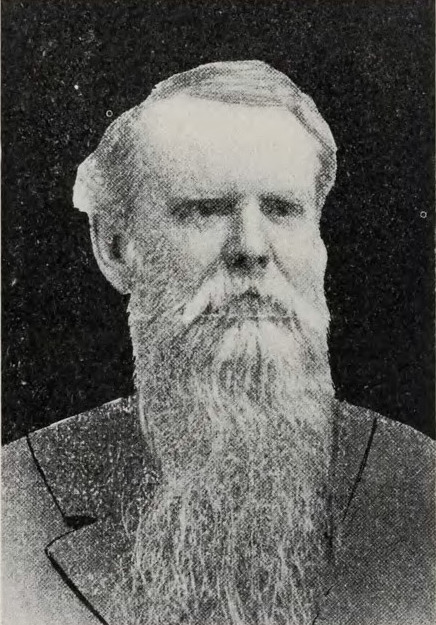
- Born: March 30, 1831 near Mount Vernon, Virginia, U.S.
- Died: February 14, 1899 (aged 67); Shepherdstown, West Virginia, U.S.
- Military career
- Allegiance: Confederate States of America
- Branch: Confederate States Army
- Service years: 1861–1865
- Rank: Colonel
- Commands: 1st Virginia Cavalry
- Conflicts: American Civil War: Battle of Bull Run; Peninsular Campaign; Seven Days' Battles; Second Battle of Bull Run; Battle of Antietam; Battle of Fredericksburg; Battle of Chancellorsville; Battle of Brandy Station; Battle of Gettysburg; Bristoe Campaign; Overland Campaign; Siege of Petersburg; Valley Campaigns of 1864; Appomattox Campaign

William Augustine Morgan (March 30, 1831 – February 14, 1899) was a Virginia planter from Shepherdstown who became a Confederate States Army cavalry officer throughout the American Civil War, then represented Jefferson County at the West Virginia Constitutional Convention of 1872 and served as the county's deputy sheriff for 26 years.

== Early and family life ==
Morgan was born on March 31, 1831, near Mount Vernon in Fairfax County, Virginia. The family moved to Jefferson County in 1837. He was descended from the First Families of Virginia, his great-grandfather Daniel Morgan having famously lead an infantry company from Western Virginia to Boston, Massachusetts in 1775 on what was locally called the "Bee-Line March," to assist patriots during the American Revolutionary War.

On December 20, 1854, William A. Morgan married Anna Jaquelin Smith, daughter of Col. Austin C. Smith. They would have at least four sons and three daughters: Augustus C. Morgan (b. 1856), Mary A. Morgan (b. 1858), Bettie M. Morgan (b. 1860), Anna J. Morgan (b. 1862), William A. Morgan (b. 1867) and Dr. Daniel Morgan (b. 1869, who joined the U.S. Navy) and Archibald M. Morgan (who would join the 2nd West Virginia Regiment).

== Career ==
William A. Morgan led the Shepherdstown cavalry that responded to John Brown's Raid on Harpers Ferry. In July 1861 the company was formally enrolled as Company F of the 1st Virginia Cavalry of the Confederate States Army. It was initially under the command of Col. J. E. B. Stuart with Morgan initially elected (and commissioned) as a captain. When Stuart was promoted, Morgan was promoted. He received a commission as Major on October 2, 1862, and his first (brief) experience of regimental command after the Battle of Chancellorsville in April 1863. He was promoted to Lt. Colonel on July 16, 1863 (after being wounded at the Battle of Gettysburg), then to full colonel (commanding Payne's brigade, among other units in the war's final days) on October 21, 1864. His obituary in the Confederate Veteran claimed he was promoted to Brigadier General at war's end.

Meanwhile, his wife attempted to run the estate, which was in a contested area, and suffered significant damage during the war. His brother, Daniel H. Morgan, fought with the 6th Sixth Virginia Cavalry until his capture by Union forces and imprisonment at Point Lookout.

During the war's final campaign, Morgan had a horse shot out from under him on April 6, 1865, during the Battle of High Bridge. Days later, Morgan and his troops were present at Appomattox Court House but he did not surrender. Morgan laid down his arms in Winchester, Virginia, and returned to what was left of his farms in Jefferson County.

Resuming farming, Morgan remained active in local civic affairs, becoming the deputy sheriff for Jefferson County in 1872 (when many Confederate officials received pardons), as well as represented the county at the West Virginia Constitutional Convention that year. He would continue as deputy sheriff for 26 years, until his death.

He offered space on his property to the Morgans Grove Agricultural Association, which in 1885 held a very successful fair after the Shenandoah Valley Railroad reached Shepherdstown, and built a stop for the event. The fair continued annually, becoming a four day event, and bought land from Morgan's long-time neighbor, former Confederate delegate and Col. Alexander Boteler in June 1889, then grew more and spilled onto Morgan's property.

== Death and legacy ==
Morgan died in Shepherdstown, West Virginia, on February 14, 1899. The fairs continued annually for decades, but the Great Depression caused their demise. The fairgrounds themselves were sold to a farmer circa 1941, but the Shepherdstown Mens Club bought 20 acres in 1961 for use as a civic park, which they named after the Morgan family. It expanded into the Morgan's Grove historic district on the National Register of Historic Places and encompasses several properties.
