= Saratoga (Boyce, Virginia) =

Historic house in Virginia, United States

- U.S. National Register of Historic Places
- U.S. National Historic Landmark
- Virginia Landmarks Register
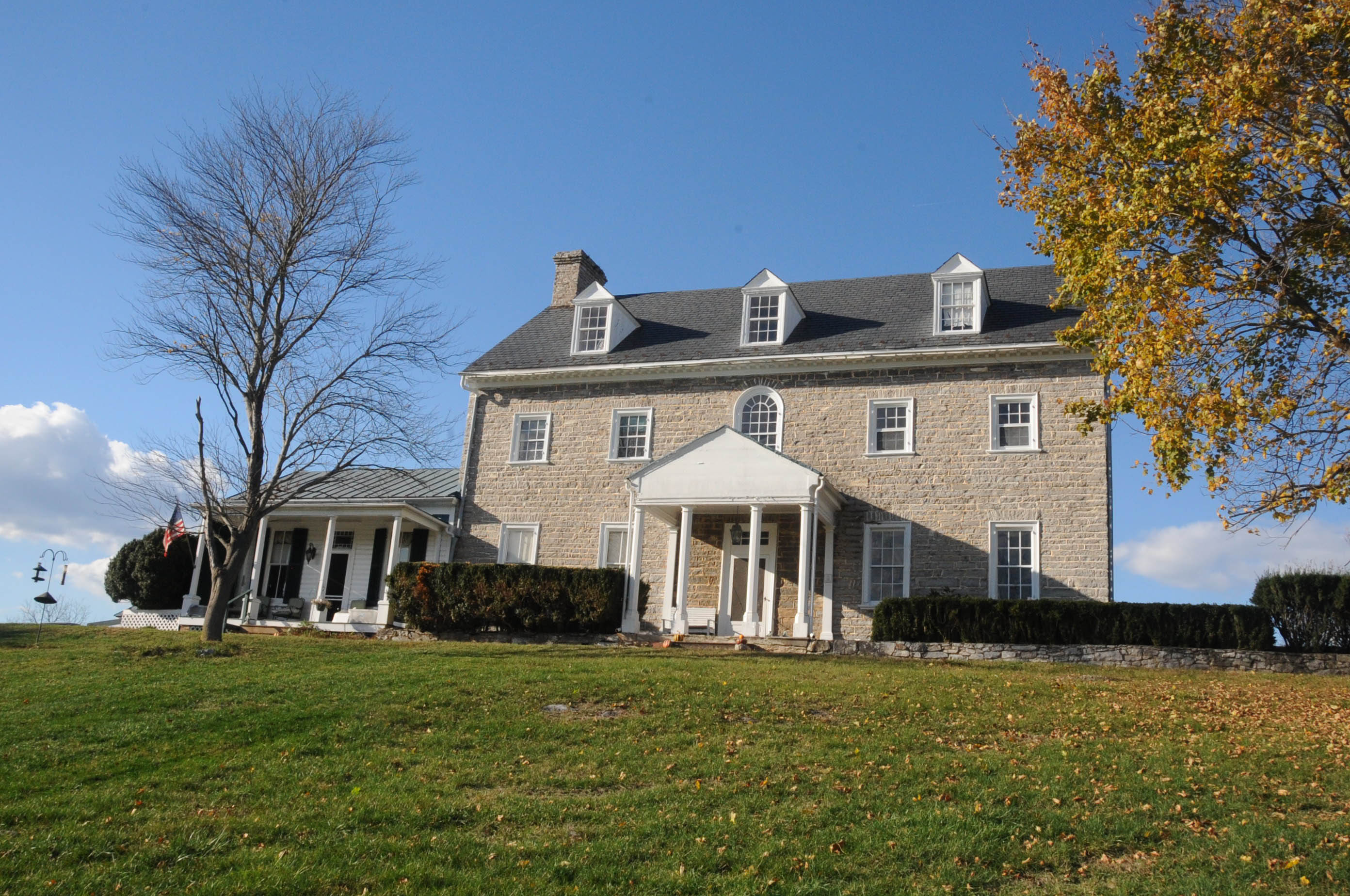
- Saratoga

- Location within Northern Virginia Location within Virginia Location within the United States
- Location: SE of jct. of Rtes. 723 and 617, Boyce, Virginia
- Coordinates: 39°4′59.7″N 78°3′36.1″W
- Area: 268.5 acres (108.7 ha)
- Built: 1779
- NRHP reference No.: 70000788
- VLR No.: 021-0070

Significant dates
- Added to NRHP: February 26, 1970
- Designated NHL: November 7, 1973
- Designated VLR: December 2, 1969

Saratoga, also known as the General Daniel Morgan House, is a historic plantation house near Boyce, Virginia. It was built in 1779 by Daniel Morgan, a general in the Continental Army best known for his victory over the British at the Battle of Cowpens in 1781. He named his estate after the American victory in the 1777 Battles of Saratoga, in which he also participated. The estate was listed on the National Register of Historic Places in 1970 and was declared a National Historic Landmark in 1973. Privately owned, it is located about .5 miles south of Boyce on the west side of County Route 723, and is not open to the public.

== Description and history ==
Saratoga is an estate of more than 250 acres (100 ha) directly south of the town of Boyce in Virginia's Shenandoah Valley. The main house is a large 2 1/2-story limestone structure with a gabled roof and end chimneys. The main facade is five bays wide, with a center entrance sheltered by a broad gabled portico. Above the entrance is a round-arch window; the other windows are standard sash. A wood-frame addition extends to the left side.

The house was built in 1779 by Daniel Morgan, who had retired that year from the Continental Army due to illness. Morgan was recalled to service as a brigadier general, and led troops in the decisive victory over the British at the 1781 Battle of Cowpens. The house is one of the largest and best-preserved plantation houses of the period in the Shenandoah Valley. After his death, Morgan's daughter sold the house to the Burwell family, and has been owned for the past century by descendants of the Robert Powel Page family. The house was also occupied at times by John Esten Cooke and his brother Philip Pendleton Cooke, both noted writers.

== Image gallery ==
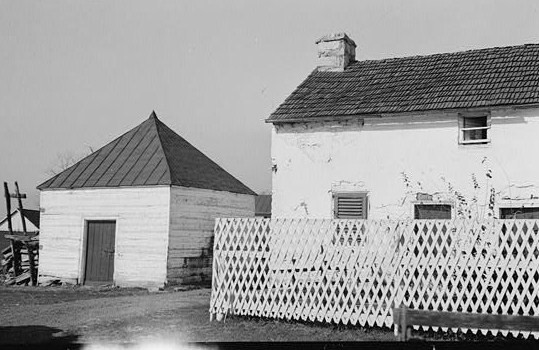
Outbuildings

== See also ==
- List of National Historic Landmarks in Virginia
- National Register of Historic Places listings in Clarke County, Virginia
