= Boydville =

Historic house in West Virginia, United States

- U.S. National Register of Historic Places
- U.S. Historic district
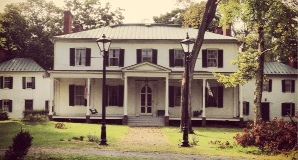

- Location within West Virginia Location within the United States
- Location: 601 S. Queen St., Martinsburg, West Virginia
- Coordinates: 39°27′5″N 77°58′5″W
- Built: 1812
- Architect: Boyd, Elisha
- Architectural style: Georgian
- NRHP reference No.: 70000649
- Added to NRHP: October 15, 1970

Boydville is a late Georgian style mansion in Martinsburg, West Virginia. The house is near the center of the associated Boydville Historic District in 15.35 acres (6.21 ha). The house was built in 1812 by Elisha Boyd, a member of the Virginia House of Delegates and an officer of the Fourth Virginia Regiment in the War of 1812.

The two story stucco-covered stone house consists of a center wing with nine rooms, a right wing that originally served as the nursery, and a left wing that housed the kitchens. The center-hall main house retains its original woodwork, with hand-carved door frames and mantelpieces imported from England. Interior partitions are brick covered with plaster.

Elisha Boyd left the house to his daughter Mary at his death in 1841. Mary was married to Charles J. Faulkner I (1806–1884), was a member of the Virginia House of Delegates who advocated a gradual abolition of slavery and the forcible annexation of Texas from Mexico. Faulkner served as ambassador to France in the James Buchanan administration, 1859–1861. Faulkner was Stonewall Jackson's assistant adjutant-general during the American Civil War, and was temporary president of the West Virginia Constitutional Convention of 1872. Faulkner's son, Charles J. Faulkner II (1847–1929) became a United States senator.

During the American Civil War Boydville and two other houses were marked for burning by General David Hunter in retaliation for the burning of Maryland Governor Bradford's house. On an hour's notice Mary Faulkner obtained an exemption from Abraham Lincoln, saving the house.

Boydville was listed on the National Register of Historic Places in 1970.

== Digital Art ==
In addition, Boydville lends its name to a metaphorical location that is said to store all things "Boyd"; flawed or otherwise unsound interactive initiatives referred to in the context of digital art and computational or generative design.

== See also ==
- Edgewood (Bunker Hill, West Virginia)
- Bunker Hill Historic District
