= 1st Virginia Cavalry Regiment =

Confederate States Army unit

- Flag of Virginia, 1861
- Active: July 1861 – April 1865
- Disbanded: April 1865
- Country: Confederacy
- Allegiance: Confederate States of America
- Branch: Confederate States Army
- Role: Cavalry
- Engagements: American Civil War: First Battle of Bull Run; Peninsula Campaign; Seven Days' Battles; Battle of Chancellorsville; Battle of Brandy Station; Battle of Gettysburg; Bristoe Campaign; Overland Campaign; Siege of Petersburg; Valley Campaigns of 1864; Appomattox Campaign

Commanders
- Notable commanders: Colonel J.E.B. Stuart; Colonel William "Grumble" Jones; Colonel Fitzhugh Lee

The 1st Virginia Cavalry Regiment was a cavalry regiment raised in Virginia for service in the Confederate States Army during the American Civil War. It fought mostly with the Army of Northern Virginia.

== Organization ==
The 1st Virginia Cavalry completed its organization at Winchester, Virginia, in July 1861, under the command of Colonel James Ewell Brown (J.E.B.) Stuart at the command of General Thomas Jackson. Unlike most regiments, the First contained twelve companies. The men were from the counties of Amelia, Augusta, Berkeley, Clarke, Frederick, Gloucester, Jefferson, Loudoun, Rockbridge, Rockingham, and Washington.

== History ==
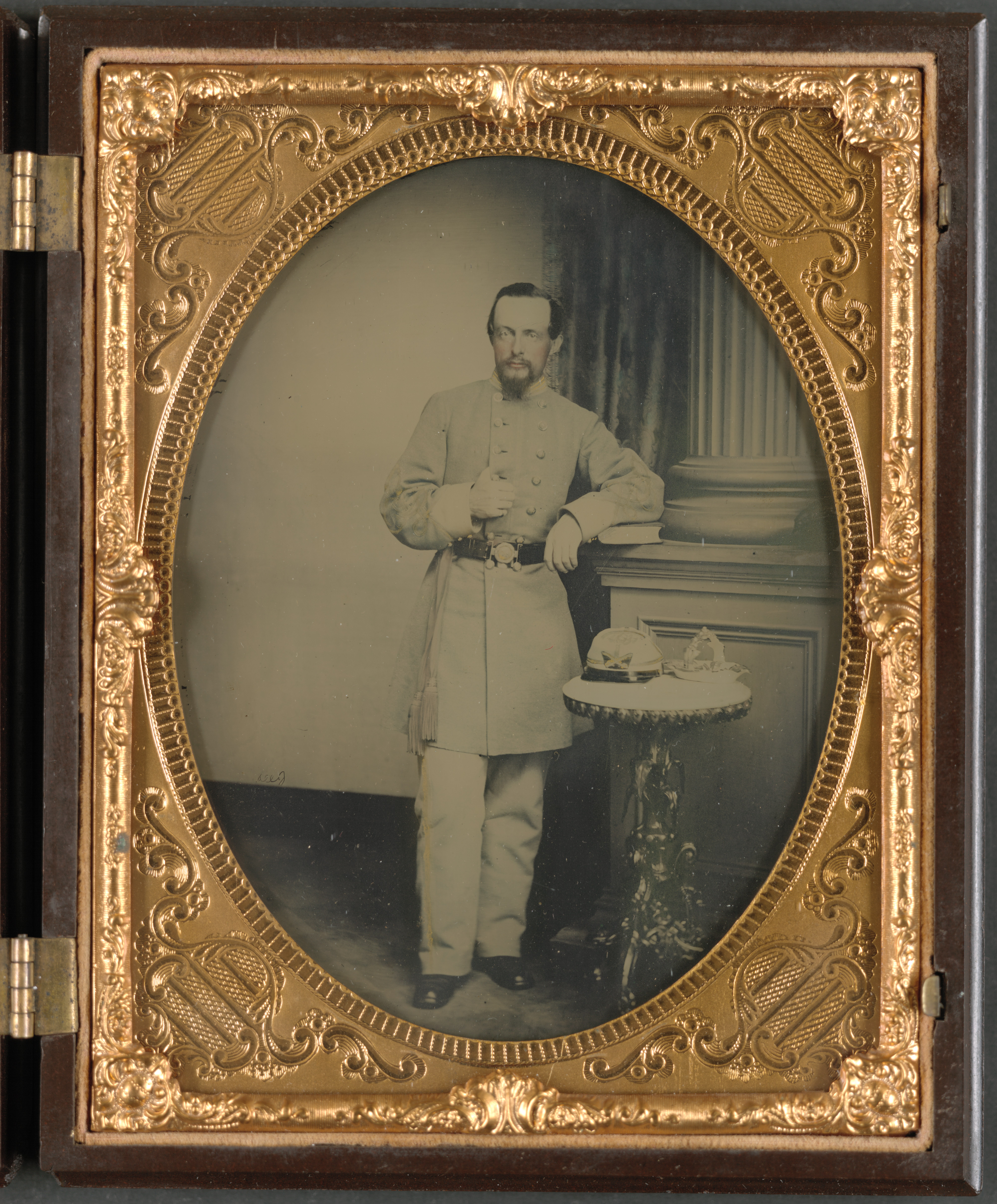
Captain George Riggs Gaither of K Company, 1st Virginia Cavalry

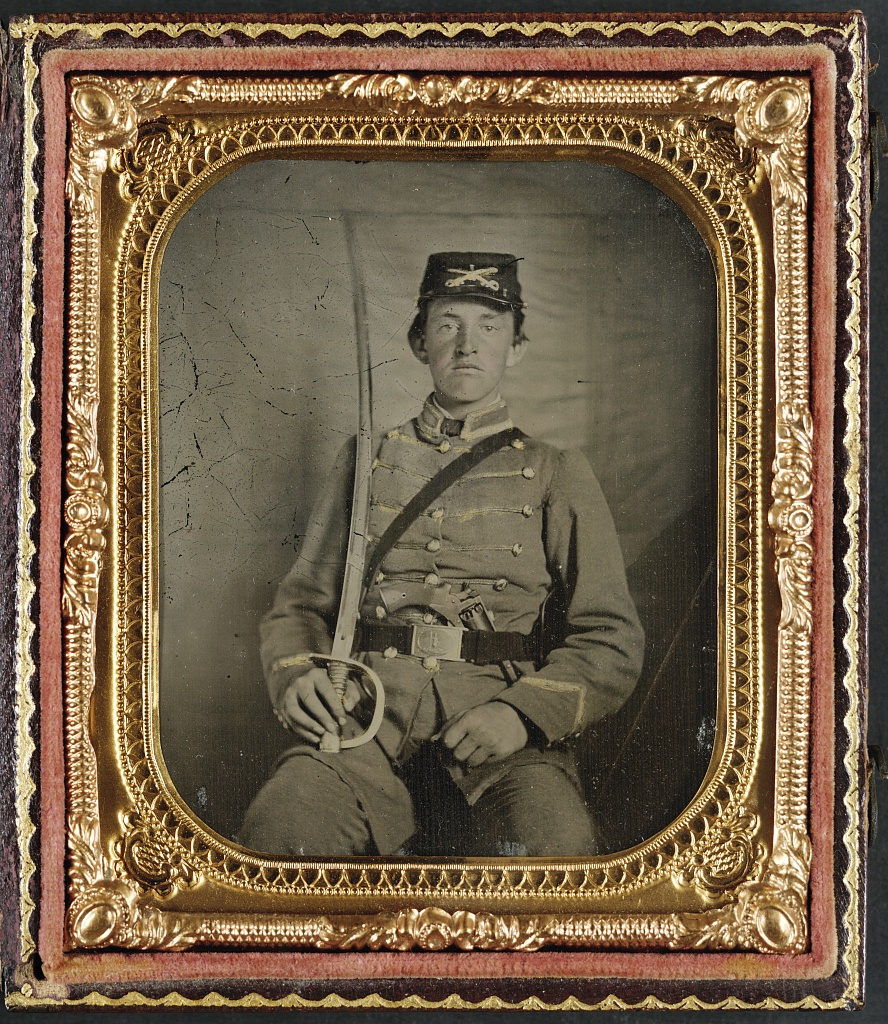
Private David M. Thatcher of Company B, Berkeley Troop, 1st Virginia Cavalry Regiment

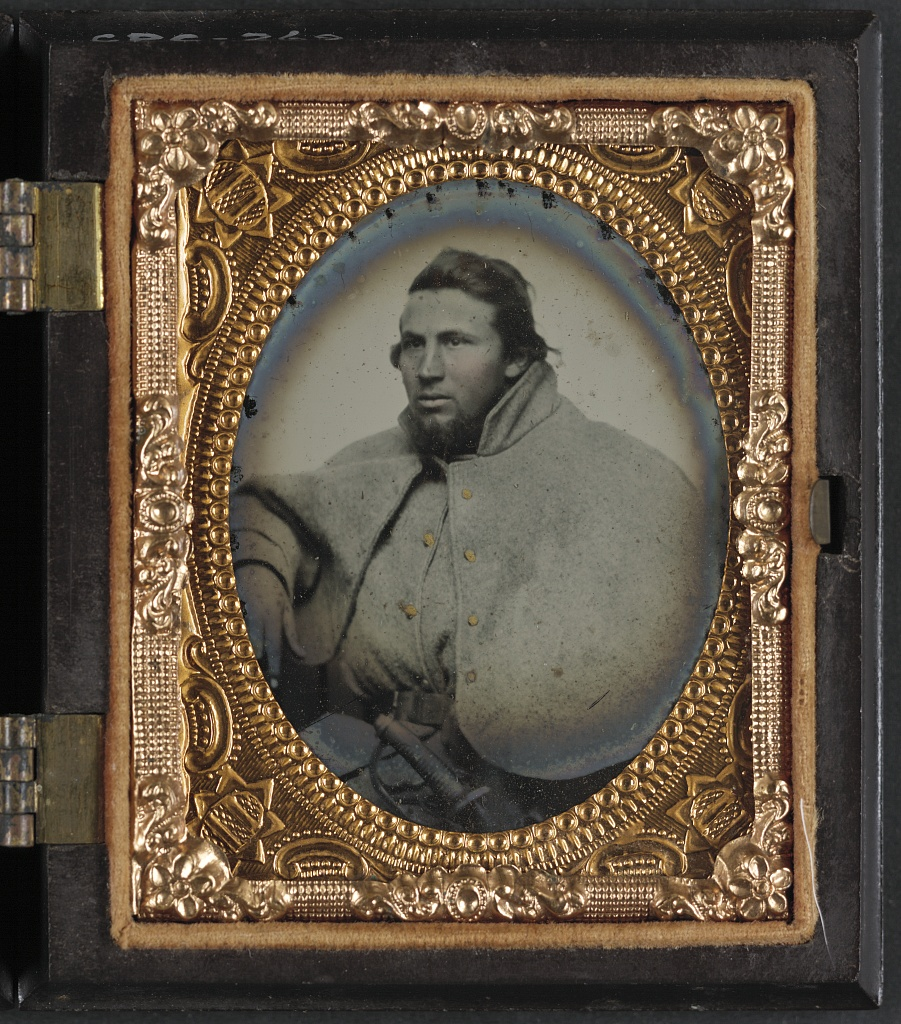
Unidentified soldier in 1st Virginia Cavalry great coat

The First Virginia Cavalry participated in more than 200 engagements of various types throughout the American Civil War, during which it was reorganized several times. Its significant casualties at the First Battle of Bull Run led to reorganization and placement under the command of Brigadier General J.E.B. Stuart. However, members were allowed to elect their lower officers, and they failed to re-elect career U.S. army officer and future Confederate general William E. Jones, who was then transferred to lead the 7th Virginia Cavalry. Thus, Gen. Stuart relayed his orders to Lt. Col. (and future Virginia governor)Fitzhugh Lee. In 1863, further Confederate Army reorganization placed the First Virginia Cavalry under the command of General Williams Carter Wickham (formerly of the 4th Virginia Cavalry). Although decimated by casualties and surrenders under General Jubal Early as it defended the Shenandoah Valley at the war's end, the First Virginia Cavalry technically ended the war under the command of Gen. Thomas T. Munford (formerly of the 2nd Virginia Cavalry).

During 1862, the First Virginia Cavalry participated in the Seven Days Battles and Stuart's ride around McClellan. The regiment then participated in cavalry clashes at Gainesville, Second Bull Run, Antietam, Fredericksburg, Kelly's Ford, Chancellorsville, Brandy Station, Gettysburg, Bristoe Station, the Wilderness, Todd's Tavern, Spotsylvania, Bethesda Church, and Cold Harbor.

In 1864, the First Virginia was involved in Jubal Early's operations in the Shenandoah Valley. Although many of the remaining soldiers either became casualties or were allowed to return to their homes by early 1865, members did participate in the defense of Petersburg, and the Appomattox Campaign. The remains of the cavalry unit cut through the Federal lines at Appomattox, shortly before it was formally disbanded. Only one man from this unit was present at the surrender. In April 1862, the First Virginia Cavalry totaled 437 men. It lost eight percent of the 310 engaged at Gettysburg in July 1863, and had 318 fit for duty in September 1864. Other field officers (alphabetically) included Colonels R. Welby Carter (of Company H; son of Sen.John A. Carter), James H. Drake, and William A. Morgan; Lieutenant Colonels L. Tiernan Brien and Charles R. Irving; and Major Robert Swan.

Future U.S. Solicitor General Holmes Conrad enlisted in Company A at the beginning of the war. He was commissioned a lieutenant and eventually transferred to division headquarters.

Company F boasted a namesake to Abraham Lincoln, a Private from Jefferson County. However, in 1864, he deserted.

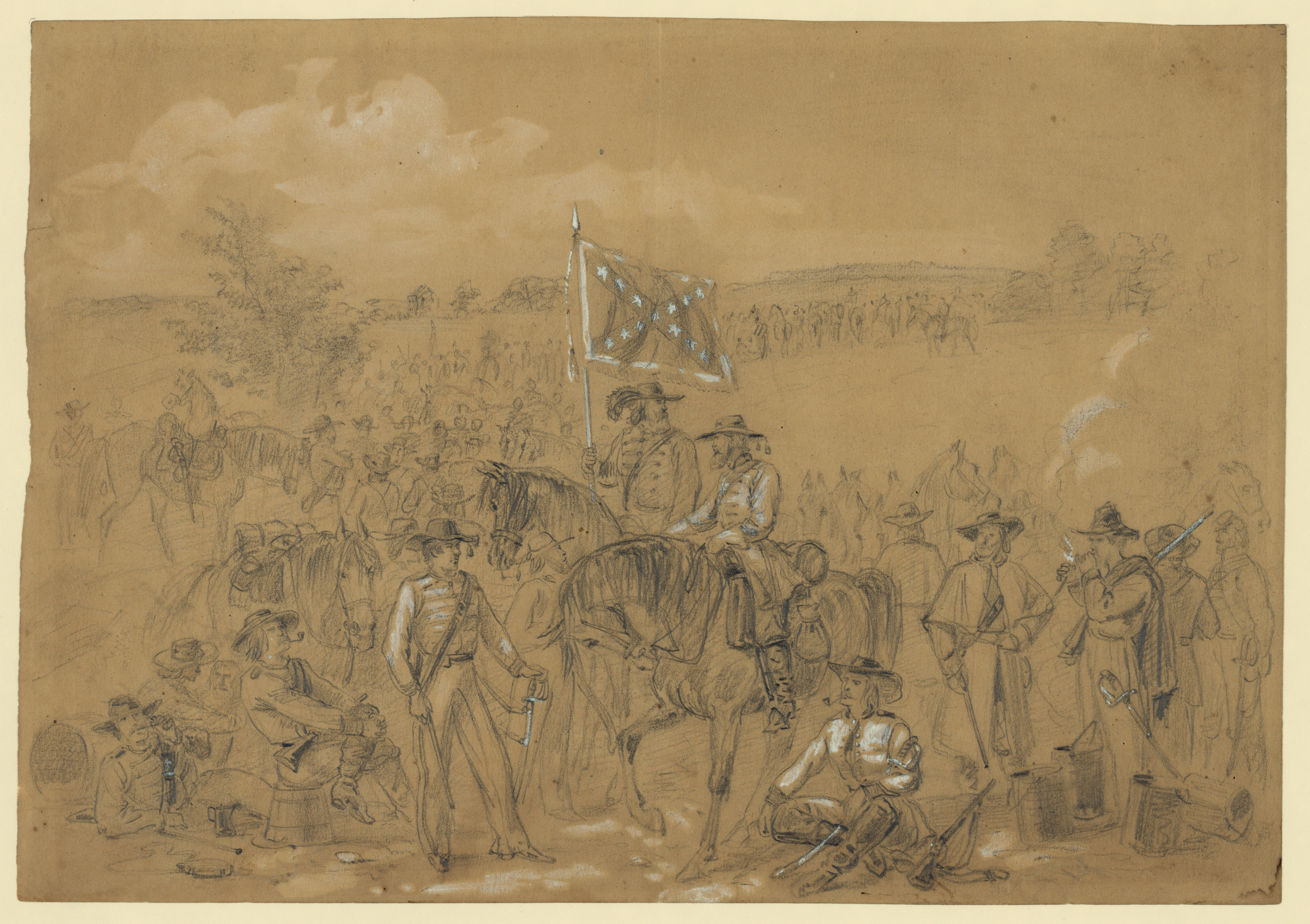
The 1st Virginia Cavalry at a halt by Alfred R. Waud.

== Temporary Attachments ==
Captain Martin's Independent Company Mississippi Cavalry and Captain Stone's Independent Company Alabama Cavalry were temporarily attached to this regiment as Company N and O.

== See also ==
- List of Virginia Civil War units
- List of West Virginia Civil War Confederate units
