= Philip Pendleton Cooke =

American poet

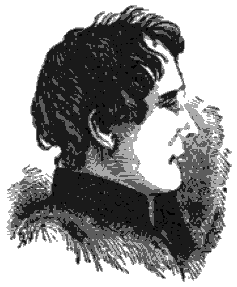
- Born: October 26, 1816; Martinsburg, Virginia, U.S.
- Died: January 20, 1850 (aged 33); Clarke County, Virginia, U.S.
- Notable work: Froissart Ballads: and Other Poems
- Spouse: Williann Corbin Tayloe Burwell (1837−1850, his death)
- Children: 5
- Relatives: John Esten Cooke (brother); John Pendleton Kennedy (cousin)

Philip Pendleton Cooke (October 26, 1816 – January 20, 1850) was an American lawyer and minor poet from Virginia.

== Early and family life ==
Cooke was born on October 26, 1816, in Martinsburg when it was then part of Virginia to the former Maria Pendleton and her husband, planter and delegate John R. Cooke (1788−1854). He was thus descended from the First Families of Virginia. Of the large (13 child) family, his younger brother John Esten Cooke would become a minor novelist as well as lawyer, then a Confederate officer during the American Civil War while his cousin Philip St. George Cooke became a Union officer. Much earlier, the Cooke brothers received a private education appropriate to their class. Philip attended Princeton University, and graduated in 1834.

== Career ==
Cooke spent the majority of his life in the northern part of the Shenandoah Valley. At Princeton, Cooke wrote the poems "Song of the Sioux Lovers," "Autumn," and "Historical Ballads, No. 6 Persian: Dhu Nowas," as well as a short story, "The Consumptive" before graduation. Admitted to the Virginia bar, Cooke followed in his father's profession as a lawyer. His two main hobbies, however, were hunting and writing, though he never made a profession out of his writing. He once wrote: "I detest the law. On the other hand, I love the fever-fits of composition." Cooke lived for a time at Saratoga, the former home of Daniel Morgan.

== Death and legacy ==
Cooke died January 20, 1850.

== Writings ==
Cooke believed his literary sustenance came from his library rather than from writing, despite several important literary figures — including John P. Kennedy and Rufus Wilmot Griswold — who encouraged him to write more. Edgar Allan Poe praised his work and wrote to him that he would "give your contributions a hearty welcome, and the choicest position in the magazine." By 1835, he resolved to give up on poetry entirely. He believed that poetry was as barren "as a worn-out tobacco field" and that even William Cullen Bryant, who he considered "the master of them all," had "sheltered himself from starvation behind the columns of a political newspaper" rather than making money from poetry. By 1847, the Southern Literary Messenger reported that Cooke had turned into a prose writer.

Cooke was well-read and his poetry was inspired by Edmund Spenser, Geoffrey Chaucer and Dante Aligheri. He also admired the prose work of Poe, which he told in a letter:

I have always found some remarkable thing in your stories to haunt me long after reading them. The teeth in Berenice—the changing eyes of Morella—that red & glaring crack in the House of Usher—the pores of the deck in the MS. Found in a Bottle—the visible drops falling into the goblet in Ligeia.
