= John Esten Cooke =

American novelist (1830–1886)

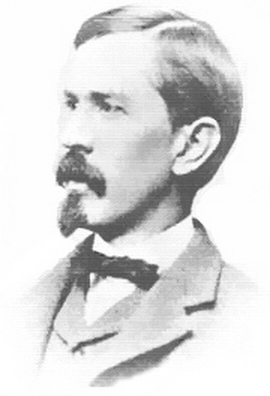
- Born: November 3, 1830; Winchester, Virginia, U.S.
- Died: September 27, 1886 (aged 55); Clarke County, Virginia, U.S.
- Resting place: Old Chapel Cemetery; Millwood, Virginia, U.S.
- Spouse: Mary Francis Page (m. 1867; died 1878)
- Father: John R. Cooke
- Relatives: Philip Pendleton Cooke (brother)

John Esten Cooke (November 3, 1830 – September 27, 1886) was an American novelist, writer and poet. He was the brother of poet Philip Pendleton Cooke. During the American Civil War, Cooke was a staff officer for Maj. Gen. J. E. B. Stuart in the Confederate States Army cavalry and, after Stuart's death, for Brig. Gen. William N. Pendleton. Stuart's wife, Flora, was a first cousin of Cooke.

== Early life ==
Born in Winchester, Virginia, on November 3, 1830, Cooke was one of 13 children (five of whom survived childhood) of Bermuda-born planter and lawyer John R. Cooke and Maria Pendleton Cooke. He was born on the family's plantation, "Ambler's Hill," near Winchester, Virginia, in the Shenandoah Valley. In 1838, "Glengary", the family estate to which the Cookes had moved, burned down. The family moved to Charles Town, Virginia and in 1840 to Richmond, Virginia.

At his father's urging, Cooke studied and practiced law briefly in Richmond but abandoned that in 1849 when continuing financial problems prevented him from enrolling at the University of Virginia. He formed a law partnership with his father in 1851 but his writing often interfered with his work.

Cooke had several manuscripts published between 1848 and 1853. In 1854, he began to write and publish books. In 1858 after his father's death, he gave up the practice of law altogether. After he started writing, he almost immediately became a successful novelist and prolific short story writer, eventually authoring 31 books and almost 200 published articles and poems. He became noted for his writing about Virginia, much of it in historical novels.

Cooke illustrated Virginia life and history in the novels, The Virginia Comedians (1854), and later The Wearing of the Gray, a tale of the American Civil War, and more formally in a respected Virginia history. His style was somewhat high-flown. He was the author of The Youth of Jefferson.

Cooke joined the Richmond Howitzers, a militia artillery unit, in the 1850s, earning the rank of sergeant. He accompanied the unit to Harpers Ferry in response to John Brown's raid.

== Civil War ==
Cooke fought with the Richmond Howitzers at the First Battle of Bull Run. After the battle, Cooke began to write to newspapers in the South, as "Our Virginia Correspondent," in order to praise Stuart and campaign for then Col. Stuart's promotion, which also was sought by Stuart's commanding officer, General Joseph E. Johnston. Stuart was promoted to brigadier general on September 24, 1861.

In March and April 1862, Cooke served as an unpaid volunteer aide for Maj. Gen. J.E.B. Stuart. Cooke was a first cousin of General Stuart's wife, Flora Cooke Stuart. On May 19, 1862, he was formally commissioned as a lieutenant and officially joined Stuart's staff. Cooke participated in the Peninsula Campaign and Stuart's subsequent ride around the Union army of George B. McClellan, later writing a detailed description of the action. Cooke served as an ordnance officer until October 1863. Despite Stuart's secret dislike for Cooke personally, Stuart praised Cooke's service during the Peninsula Campaign and Seven Days' Battles and sought a promotion for him. Stuart was promoted to major general on July 25, 1862. On June 9, 1863, Cooke and other staff members were drawn into combat at the Battle of Brandy Station.

Cooke also participated in the Gettysburg campaign with Stuart. Soon after the start of the Stuart's ride around the Union Army of the Potomac, Cooke was nearly shot or captured during the Battle of Fairfax Court House (June 1863). He was eating breakfast with two other staff officers and a courier at the home of a blacksmith while the blacksmith shoed their horses. The Confederate officers were about a half mile from the main body of Brig. Gen. Wade Hampton III's cavalry division when advance riders from the 11th Regiment New York Volunteer Cavalry rode by in pursuit of the advance guard of Hampton's division. The other three Confederates quickly fled toward their main body but Cooke was intent on finishing his breakfast and having his horse shoed. He barely escaped when a second group of Union riders became suspicious of the nature of activity at the farm and rode up to check.

During the war, Cooke served Stuart as an aide, ordnance officer, and assistant adjutant general, earning the rank of captain. On October 27, 1863, Stuart made Cooke an adjutant in order to put his writing talent to work in catching up on his paperwork.

Although Cooke wrote favorably about Stuart during and after the war, Stuart confidentially told Flora (but not Cooke himself) that he did not like Cooke and found him boring.

Following Stuart's death at Yellow Tavern in May 1864, Cooke served as an adjutant on the staff of Brig. Gen. William N. Pendleton, eventually rising to the rank of major by the end of the war.

== Postbellum career ==
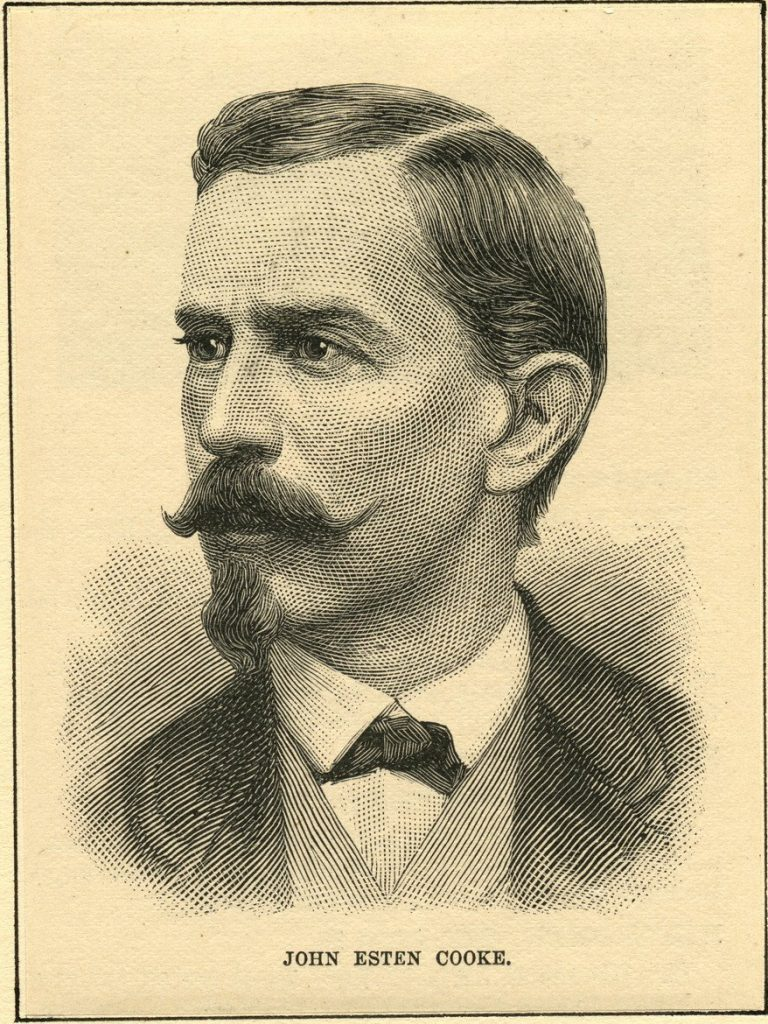
Portrait of John Esten Cook

In 1867, Cooke married Mary Frances Page and settled down at the former home of Daniel Morgan, Saratoga, near Boyce, Virginia, to become a marginally prosperous farmer and gardener as well as an author. The Cookes had three children. To Cooke's great grief, Mary Frances died on January 15, 1878.

Historian Emory M. Thomas wrote: "John Esten Cooke used and embellished his in-law's fame in a series of stories and novels that made Cooke famous. He never knew that Stuart thought him an enormous bore." In 1869 and 1870, Cooke published a trilogy of Civil War novels: Hilt to Hilt: Days and Nights on the Banks of the Shenandoah in the Autumn of 1864; Mohun: or, The Last Days of Lee and His Paladins: Final Memoirs Of A Staff Officer Serving In Virginia. From The Mss. Of Colonel Surry, Of Eagle's Nest; and Hammer and Rapier. His 1870 The Heir of Gaymount was published by John H. Van Evrie, who has been described as America's "first professional racist" and found Cooke to be a useful ally in his efforts to forward white supremacy by publishing relevant novels and poetry.

Even before the end of the war, in 1863, Cooke wrote the first of several popular biographies, Stonewall Jackson: A Military Biography, published in 1876, for which he received some contemporary criticism for the errors in the book. He earlier published a novel on Jackson, Surry of Eagle's Nest (1866). His later efforts at biography, such as a biography of Robert E. Lee and officers that he had personally known, were considered more accurate than his early Jackson biography. In his declining years, his works showed the same style that he had used earlier in life, not showing any growth or development.

John Esten Cooke died of typhoid fever at his home, "The Briars," on September 27, 1886. Cooke was buried in Old Chapel Cemetery in Millwood, Virginia.

== John Esten Cooke Fiction Award ==
The John Esten Cooke Fiction Award is given "annually to encourage writers of fiction to portray characters and events dealing with the Civil War, Confederate heritage, or Southern history in a historically accurate fashion." The $1,000 grant and award competition, open to book-length works, is judged on "effectiveness of research, accuracy of statement, and excellence of style." The Cooke Fiction Award is one of three literary prizes given annually by the Military Order of the Stars and Bars.
