= Bunker Hill Historic District =

Historic church in West Virginia, United States

- U.S. National Register of Historic Places
- U.S. Historic district
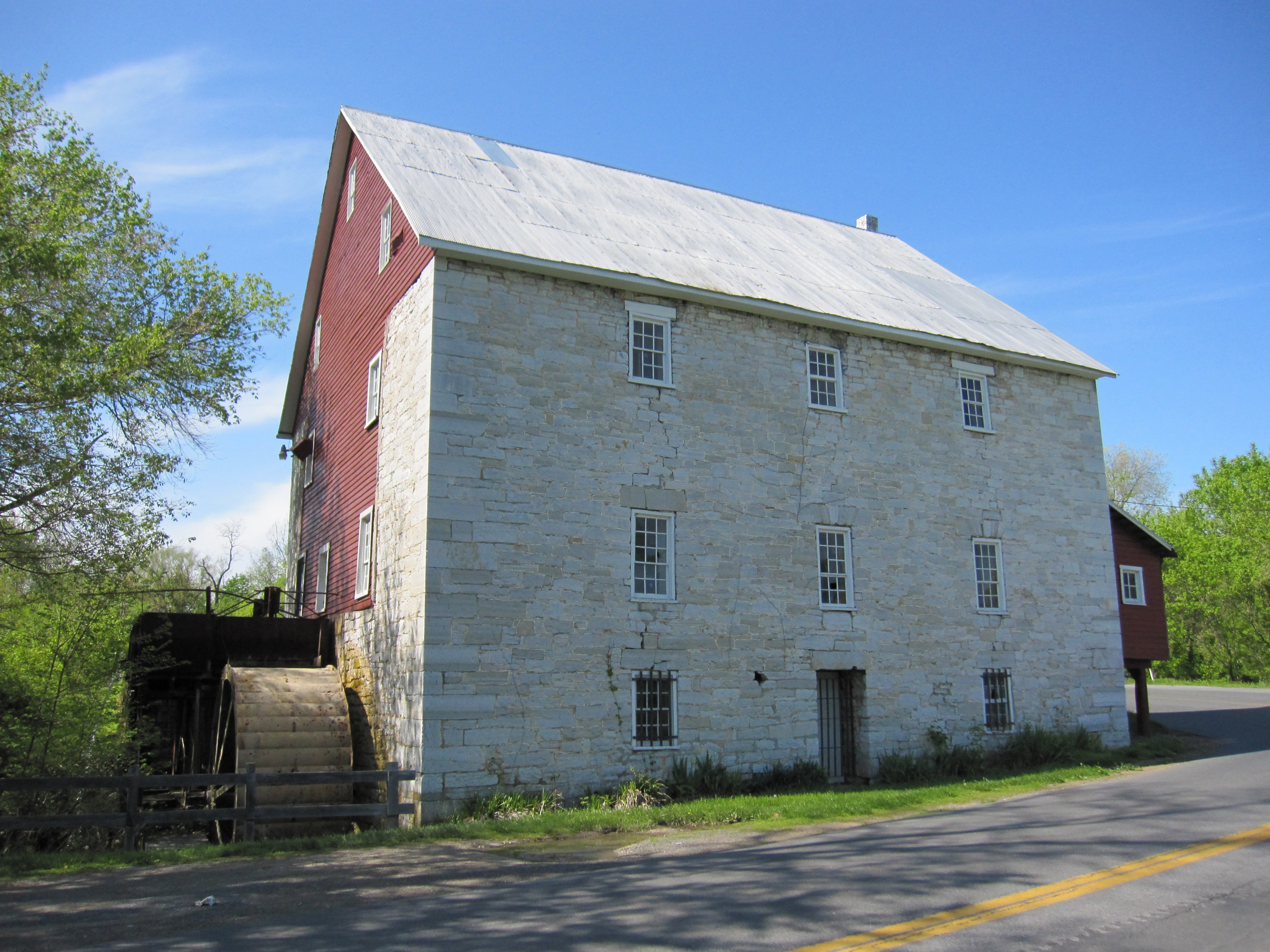
- Bunker Hill Mill in 2011

- Location within West Virginia Location within the United States
- Location: Jct. of US 11 and Rt. 26, Bunker Hill, West Virginia
- Coordinates: 39°19′56″N 78°3′13″W
- Area: 14 acres (5.7 ha)
- Architectural style: Stick/eastlake, Gothic Revival, American Greek Revival
- MPS: Berkeley County MRA
- NRHP reference No.: 80004412
- Added to NRHP: December 10, 1980

The Bunker Hill Historic District is the center of the town of Bunker Hill, West Virginia. Today located on the road called US 11, the town was developed along the Martinsburg, West Virginia - Winchester, Virginia road. Bunker Hill served southern Berkeley County with three stores, six mills, and five churches. It was also home to a significant African-American population.

Much of the land around Bunker Hill belonged to General Elisha Boyd, who built what amounted to an industrial village, with two mills, a brick-making operation, a cooperage, and a store on part of his Edgewood Manor plantation. After General Boyd's death in 1841 his son John tried to develop the area as a town, selling some lots and building another store and a log house. The most southern lots in the town were sold to African Americans, and represent an example of a segregated community in the post-Civil War period, becoming known as "Black Row."

Significant contributing buildings include:

- Boyd's Store: A brick pre-Civil War house.
- Jesse Brilhart Store: Built circa 1852 and operating as a store into the 1980s. It retains its interior furnishings.
- North Music School: A two-story stone building.
- Boyd House: A two-story building resembling the Bunker Hill Store.
- Bunker Hill Methodist Church: A Gothic Revival church built in 1912.
- The Parsonage: Late Victorian Gothic in style, with some surviving trim details
- Mount Tabor Baptist Church: A one-story frame building, located on "Black Row."
- New Presbyterian Church: Originally built in 1854, it was heavily damaged in the Civil War. It was rebuilt in 1879 in the Romanesque Revival style.

The district was listed on the National Register of Historic Places in 1980.
