= Charles J. Faulkner =

American politician

Charles James Faulkner
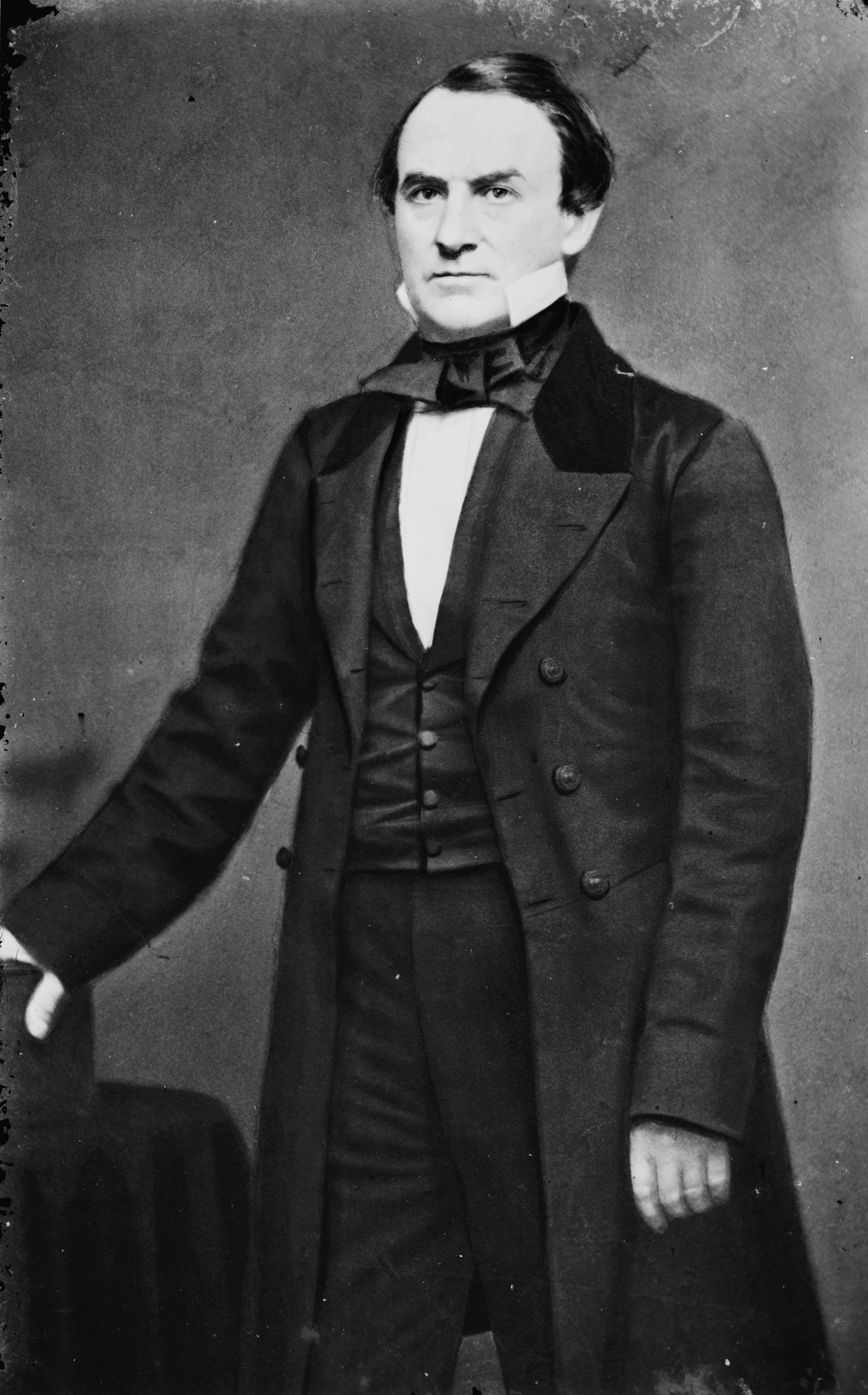

Member of the U.S. House of Representatives
- In office March 4, 1875 – March 3, 1877
- Preceded by: John Hagans
- Succeeded by: Benjamin F. Martin
- Constituency: West Virginia 2nd
- In office March 4, 1851 – March 3, 1859
- Preceded by: Richard Parker
- Succeeded by: Alexander Boteler
- Constituency: Virginia 10th (1851–1853); Virginia 8th (1853–1859)

20th United States Minister to France
- In office March 4, 1860 – May 12, 1861
- Appointed by: James Buchanan
- Preceded by: John Y. Mason
- Succeeded by: William L. Dayton

Chairman of the Committee on Military Affairs
- In office March 4, 1857 – March 3, 1859
- Preceded by: John B. Weller
- Succeeded by: Benjamin Stanton

Member of the Virginia House of Delegates from Berkeley County
- In office December 4, 1848 – December 2, 1849 Serving with William Boak
- Preceded by: James E. Stewart
- Succeeded by: Allen C. Hammond

Member of the Virginia Senate from Berkeley, Morgan and Hampshire Counties
- In office January 1, 1838 – 1842
- Preceded by: William Donaldson
- Succeeded by: Thomas Sloan
- In office December 5, 1831 – December, 1833
- Preceded by: Thomas Davis
- Succeeded by: Edmund P. Hunter
- In office December 7, 1829 – December 5, 1830
- Preceded by: Joel Ward
- Succeeded by: Levi Henshaw

Personal details
- Born: July 6, 1806 Martinsburg, Virginia, U.S.
- Died: November 1, 1884 (aged 78) Martinsburg, West Virginia, U.S.
- Party: Democratic
- Other political affiliations: Whig
- Spouse: Mary Wagner Boyd
- Children: 5, including Charles James Faulkner & Virginia Faulkner McSherry
- Relatives: Harry F. Byrd (great-grandson)
- Profession: Politician; lawyer

Military service
- Allegiance: Confederate States of America
- Branch/service: Confederate States Army
- Rank: Lieutenant Colonel
- Battles/wars: American Civil War

Charles James Faulkner (July 6, 1806 – November 1, 1884) was a politician, planter, and lawyer from Berkeley County, Virginia (since 1863, West Virginia) who served in both houses of the Virginia General Assembly and as a U.S. Congressman.

== Early and family life ==
Faulkner was born in Martinsburg, Berkeley County, Virginia (now West Virginia) in 1806. His father, James Faulkner, had emigrated from Ireland, and served as an artillery commander defending Norfolk during the War of 1812, alongside Elisha Boyd, whose daughter would marry this Faulkner. Although both his parents died when he was still a child, C. J. Faulkner graduated from Georgetown University in Washington, D.C. in 1822, studied law and was admitted to the Virginia bar in 1829. He married Mary Wagner Boyd, the daughter of Elisha Boyd, and received "Boydville" as part of his dowry. They had three daughters and two sons, Charles James Faulkner (1847-1929) and E. Boyd Faulkner (1841-1917). Both of his sons became Confederate officers and later politicians, diplomats and judges.

== Career ==
Faulkner practiced law, farmed using enslaved labor, and sought to develop Berkeley County. A fervent Whig and friend of U.S. Senator Henry Clay (who would visit the district many times), Faulkner advocated internal improvements (including the National Road and Chesapeake and Ohio Canal which passed through Martinsburg). He also owned slaves and was a member of the American Colonization Society. In the 1860 census, he owned $100,000 in real estate and $150,000 in personal property, including 13 slaves in Berkeley County.

=== Politician ===
Berkeley County voters first elected Faulkner one of their representatives in the Virginia House of Delegates in 1829 and he would win election (and also lose several elections) in the ensuing decades. In his initial speech, he advocated gradual emancipation. Faulkner was also soon appointed a commissioner concerning the boundary dispute between Virginia and Maryland.

In 1838, voters in Berkeley, Morgan and Hampshire Counties elected Faulkner to the Virginia State Senate and he won re-election in 1841. In 1848 Faulkner again won election to the House of Delegates. There, he introduced a law which became a model for the Fugitive Slave Act of 1850.

In 1850, Faulkner was elected to the Virginia Constitutional Convention of 1850, as one of four delegates elected from the northern Valley delegate district made up of Berkeley County and neighboring Jefferson and Clarke Counties. He served with William Lucas, Dennis Murphy and Andrew Hunter, and was especially vocal in extending suffrage and advocating more equitable tax adjustment, since taxing slaveowners less than their slaves' worth (and adding nonvoting slaves when proportioning the legislative seats) naturally meant more of the tax burden was placed on non-slaveowners and people in the western counties.

Faulkner was also elected to the United States House of Representatives in 1850, and he won re-election several times, serving from 1851 to 1859. He entered Congress as a Whig, but with the demise of that party, he was re-elected as a Democrat, which he remained for the rest of his Congressional career. There, Faulkner served as chairman of the Committee on Military Affairs from 1857 to 1859.

=== Diplomat and soldier ===
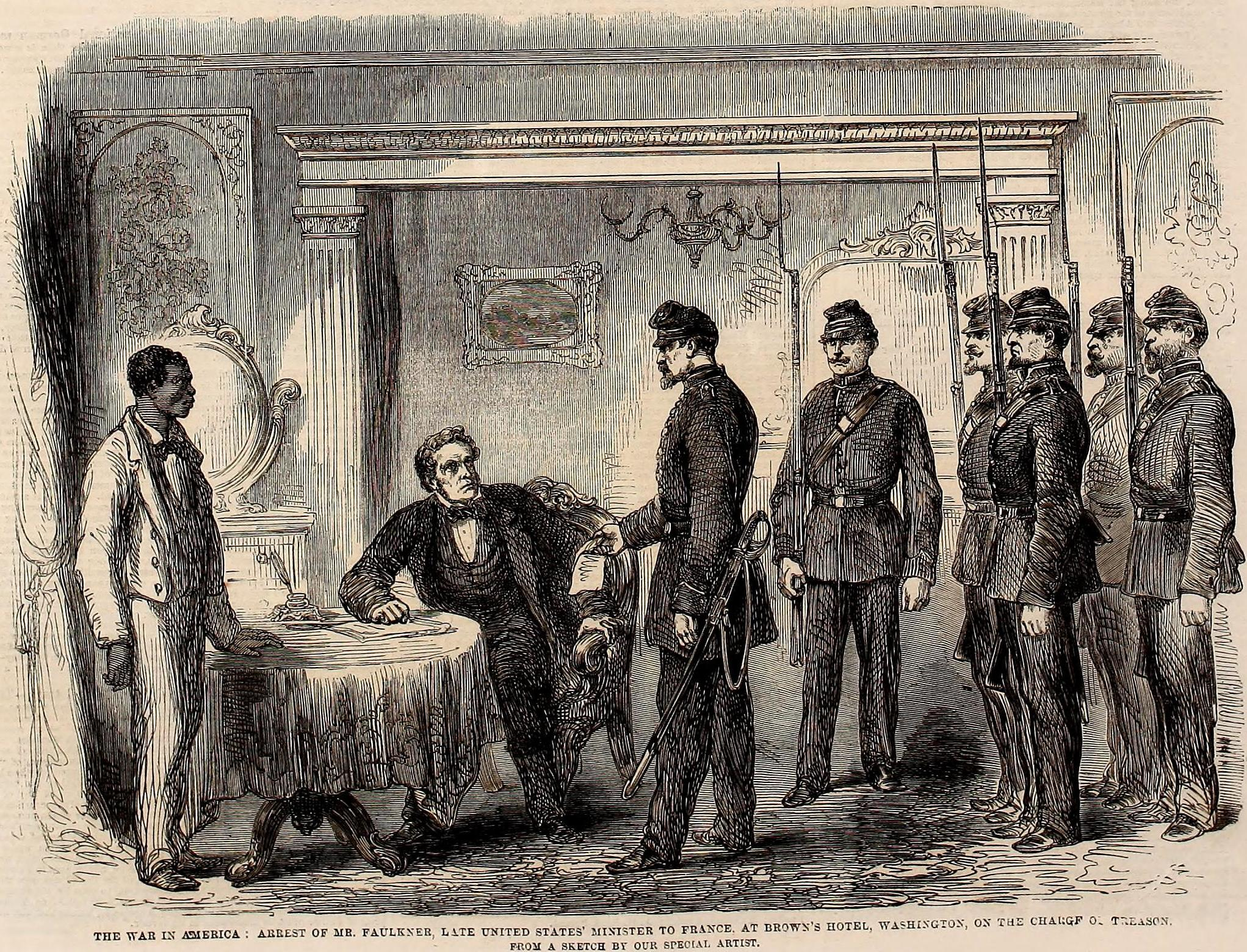
Arrest of Mr. Faulkner, at Brown's Hotel, Washington, on the charge of treason, August 1861

President James Buchanan appointed Faulkner Minister to France in 1860. He served until the onset of the American Civil War, newly elected President Abraham Lincoln having replaced him with William L. Dayton. When Faulkner returned across the Atlantic Ocean to settle matters in Washington D.C., he was arrested in August 1861 on charges of negotiating sales of arms for the Confederacy while in Paris, France. Initially imprisoned in Washington, a prisoner exchange was contemplated of Faulkner for Henry S. McGraw, formerly Pennsylvania's state treasurer and imprisoned in Richmond while seeking to recover the corpse of Col. Cameron, but McGraw was released and Faulkner instead transferred to Fort Warren in Boston Harbor. An exchange was then contemplated for Alfred Ely, a New York congressman who captured at the First Battle of Bull Run, but Confederate President Jefferson Davis wanted to make Faulkner's arrest an example before the civilized world. Union forces allowed Faulkner a 30-day parole to plead his case in Richmond, whereby Davis reluctantly consented and Faulkner was formally released in December and allowed to return to Martinsburg.

Days after his release, Faulkner enlisted in the Confederate Army and was appointed lieutenant colonel and assistant adjutant general on the staff of General Thomas J. "Stonewall" Jackson. Some of the troops in the Stonewall Brigade were from Berkeley County; Martinsburg changed control ten times during the conflict (30 months under Union governance and 16 months under Confederate governance). His two sons had already become Confederate States Army officers, leaving his wife and daughters to run Boydville. In July 1864, his wife stood up to a Union officer charged with burning Boydville as Faulkner's property, as Union troops had with fellow rebel Andrew Hunter's home in Charles Town and A.R. Butler home's in Shepherdstown. She protested that it was her property, and constructed by her father, a hero of the War of 1812, and her Union-allied nephews Edmund B. Pendleton and E. Boyd Pendleton backed her up. Thus, the house was spared.

=== Postwar ===
Faulkner returned but refused to take an oath of allegiance to the United States after the war, and only regained his law license after considerable difficulty. Railroads became his clients, since the railroads through Martinsburg needed rebuilding, and various railroad lines reorganized. Faulkner also successfully argued on behalf of West Virginia before the U.S. Supreme Court in Virginia v. West Virginia, which was decided in 1871 and led to Berkeley and Jefferson counties remaining in West Virginia. However, other litigation (concerning allocating the cost and lost subsidies of canal, bridge and railroad improvements in western Virginia devastated by the war) would extend decades after Faulkner's death.

Berkeley County voters elected Faulkner as a member of the West Virginia Constitutional Convention in 1872, and he served as the temporary chairman. Berkeley County voters would reject the final result, but the constitution was adopted by West Virginia as a whole; one matter of particular concern was organization within counties—under an elected Sheriff, Circuit Judges or Commissioners (the Ohio system)--which some condemned as a hodgepodge. The U.S. Congress removed his political disabilities by special legislation. He proved a voice of restraint in that convention, as some ex-Confederates tried to undo the 1863 Constitution (modeled on Ohio's) as too "Northern".

In 1877, Faulkner commanded the state militia in an attempt to quell a rail worker protest over pay cuts in Martinsburg, West Virginia, under the direction of Governor Henry M. Mathews. A skirmish ensued, resulting in shots fired on both sides and one death. The governor ultimately called for federal troops to restore order. However, by this time the protests had spread to become the Great Railroad Strike of 1877.

Faulkner won election back to the U.S. House of Representatives as a Democrat from West Virginia in 1874, serving from 1875 to 1877. However, he lost his attempt to become a U.S. Senator from the new state in 1876. He was also mentioned as a gubernatorial candidate in 1880. Afterward, Faulkner resumed practicing law until his death.

== Death ==
Charles J. Faulkner died at the family estate, "Boydville" near Martinsburg on November 1, 1884. He was interred in Old Norborne Cemetery in Martinsburg WV.

His son Charles James Faulkner lived at Boydville and became one of West Virginia's U.S. Senators in 1887. His great-grandson, Harry F. Byrd, would control Virginia politics for decades in the 20th century. The West Virginia State Archive holds the Faulkner family papers.

U.S. House of Representatives
Preceded by Richard Parker	Member of the U.S. House of Representatives from Virginia's 10th congressional district 1851–1853	Succeeded by Zedekiah Kidwell
Preceded by Alexander Holladay	Member of the U.S. House of Representatives from Virginia's 8th congressional district 1853–1859	Succeeded by Alexander Boteler
Preceded by John Hagans	Member of the U.S. House of Representatives from West Virginia's 2nd congressional district 1875–1877	Succeeded by Benjamin F. Martin
Diplomatic posts
Preceded by John Y. Mason	U.S. Minister to France; 1860–1861	Succeeded by William L. Dayton
