= Elisha Boyd =

American politician (1769–1841)

Member of the Virginia House of Delegates from the Berkeley County district
- In office November 10, 1795 – December 2, 1799 Serving with Richard Baylor; William Lemon; John Dixon
- Preceded by: David Hunter
- Succeeded by: Magnus Tate

Member of the Virginia House of Delegates from the Berkeley County district
- In office December 3, 1804 – December 1, 1805 Serving with Samuel Boyd
- Preceded by: Magnus Tate
- Succeeded by: Philip C. Pendleton

Member of the Virginia House of Delegates from the Berkeley County district
- In office May 17, 1813 – October 9, 1814 Serving with Edward Colston
- Preceded by: George Porterfield
- Succeeded by: John R. Cooke

Member of the Virginia Senate from the Berkeley, Hampshire, Morgan and Hardy Counties district
- In office 1824 – December 2, 1827
- Preceded by: Francis White
- Succeeded by: Charles A. Turley

Member of the Virginia House of Delegates from the Berkeley district
- In office December 1, 1828 – December 5, 1830 Serving with Joel Ward; Charles J. Faulkner
- Preceded by: Moses T. Hunter
- Succeeded by: Levi Henshaw

Member of the Virginia Senate from the Berkeley, Hampshire and Morgan district
- In office December 6, 1830 – December 1, 1834
- Preceded by: Charles A. Turley
- Succeeded by: William Donaldson

Personal details
- Born: October 6, 1769 Martinsburg, Virginia
- Died: October 21, 1841 (aged 72) Martinsburg, Virginia
- Party: Whig
- Spouse(s): Mary Waggoner; Ann Holmes; Elizabeth Byrd
- Education: Liberty Hall Academy
- Profession: Lawyer, newspaper editor

Military service
- Allegiance: United States of America
- Branch/service: Virginia militia
- Years of service: 1812-1814
- Rank: colonel, general
- Battles/wars: War of 1812

Elisha Boyd (October 6, 1769 – October 21, 1841) was a Virginia lawyer, soldier, slaveowner and politician who served in both houses of the Virginia General Assembly, and developed Berkeley County.

== Early and family life ==
Elisha Boyd was born on October 6, 1769, in what became Berkeley County, Virginia (in 1772) to Sarah Griffith Boyd and her husband John Boyd, who had purchased a large tract from Lord Fairfax at the headwaters of Tuscarora Creed at the east base of North Mountain and the northernmost end of the Shenandoah Valley. His father was thus one of the early emigrants to Berkeley County, which the Virginia General Assembly split it off from then-vast and later neighboring Frederick County, Virginia.

Elisha received a private education, including at Liberty Hall Academy, a predecessor of Washington and Lee University in Staunton, Virginia, graduating in 1785. He also studied law in the office of Colonel Philip Pendleton. Elisha Boyd helped to establish Martinsburg Academy, which closed near the end of his life (after the Panic of 1837). He married three times, one of then in 1795 in Frederick County, Virginia. His first wife was Mary Waggoner, a daughter of Major Andrew Waggoner, and they had one child. His second wife was Ann Holmes, daughter of Colonel Joseph Holmes and the sister of both Virginia Congressman (and Mississippi Territorial governor) David Holmes and Major Andrew Hunter Holmes. They four children. Their daughter Mary Boyd Hunter, married Charles J. Faulkner Sr. (and their son Charles J. Faulkner would become a Confederate officer and later U.S. Senator from West Virginia). Elisha Boyd built “Boydville” in 1812 and bequeathed it to Mary and Charles Faulkner Sr. upon his death. His third wife was Elizabeth Byrd of the Westover Byrd family. They married in Richmond, Virginia on March 10, 1827 and she died not long before him, on November 16, 1839.

== Military service ==
Boyd served in the War of 1812, receiving a commission as Colonel of the 4th Regiment of Virginia Militia. Their troop of Berkeley County militia defended Norfolk and Portsmouth against a British naval and land attack; another Berkeley County militia troop would be the first to reach Washington, D.C. after the British burned the new nation's capitol. His first father in law, Andrew Waggoner, would be cited for heroism at the Battle of Lundy's Lane. For his services defending Virginia, the General Assembly elected Boyd a Brigadier General.

== Politics ==
In 1796, Berkeley County voters first elected Boyd to the Virginia House of Delegates, a part-time position. He would be re-elected to the House of Delegates several times, as well as lose several elections. By the 1820 U.S. Federal census, Boyd was one of the county's wealthiest individuals, for he owned 24 slaves in addition to land.

Boyd won election to the Senate of Virginia in 1824, representing Berkeley, Hampshire, Morgan and Hardy Counties. He replaced Francis White, who gave up that part-time job upon becoming Commonwealth's attorney for Hampshire County. After losing his senatorial re-election bid, Boyd won election again (then re-election) to the House of Delegates. During this time, Boyd served as Commonwealth's attorney (prosecutor) for Berkeley County 40 years, and was commissioned a magistrate of Berkeley County in 1838. Boyd was a member of the Virginia Constitutional Convention of 1829-1830, and was again elected in 1832 to a seat in the Virginia Senate, where he advocated reform of the “Old Constitution” of Virginia which underrepresented the western counties. He was also elected chairman of the Berkeley county meeting. By the 1840 federal census, Elisha Boyd owned 111 slaves, of whom 40 were employed in agriculture.

== Death ==
General Boyd died October 21, 1841, less than two years after his third wife, and was buried in the family plot at Norborne Cemetery in Martinsburg, West Virginia. Two years later, Episcopalians were able to erect Trinity Episcopal Church in Martinsburg, based on his donation of land for the church.

His son and daughters would also be slaveowners and several (but not all) grandsons fought for the Confederacy. His son John E. Boyd (1811-1888) would marry, inherit the plantation and slaves, have two sons and remained in Berkeley County despite losing the slaves during the American Civil War. His daughter Mary Wagner Boyd Faulkner (1817–1894) inherited Boydville. His daughter Sarah Ann Boyd Pendleton (1797-1868) also survive him and the American Civil War, although her husband Judge Philip Clayton Pendleton died in 1863. His grandson Edmund Boyd Pendleton (1816-1880) would become a Virginia politician and lawyer (serving one term in the House of Delegates and twice voting against secession at the Virginia Secession Convention of 1861), but after his parents' deaths and after being elected a judge in Winchester Virginia in 1869 decide to move there.

== Legacy ==
Two historic sites and three historic districts in Berkeley County, West Virginia, are associated with Elisha Boyd and listed on the National Register of Historic Places. They are: "Boydville" and the surrounding Boydville Historic District; Edgewood Manor; and a number of buildings located in the Bunker Hill Historic District and Mill Creek Historic District.
