= Wodrow =

Wodrow may refer to a number of things or people:

- Wilson-Wodrow-Mytinger House, built by Andrew Wodrow, an American Revolutionary patriot
- Robert Wodrow (1679–1734), Scottish historian
- Andrew Wodrow (1752–1814), Scottish American merchant, militia officer, clerk of court, lawyer and landowner
