= John A. Carter (Virginia politician) =

Virginia lawyer, farmer and politician (1808–1890)

John Armistead Carter

Member of the Virginia House of Delegates from the Loudoun district
- In office December 3, 1842 – December 1, 1844 Serving with William H. Gray, Daniel Miller; John Grubb, A. Sidney Tebbs
- Preceded by: Sanford J. Ramey
- Succeeded by: Sanford J. Ramey

Member of the Virginia Senate from the Loudoun district
- In office December 5, 1859 – December 1, 1861
- Preceded by: Noble S. Braden
- Succeeded by: Burr P. Noland

Member of the Virginia House of Delegates from the Loudoun district
- In office January 1, 1874 – December 4, 1877 Serving with Mathew Harrison, William Mathew
- Preceded by: William Mathew
- Succeeded by: John R. Carter

Personal details
- Born: November 25, 1808 Richmond County, Virginia, U.S.
- Died: 1890 Loudoun County, Virginia, U.S.
- Resting place: Willisville, Loudoun County, Virginia
- Spouse: Richardetta Louisa De Butts
- Children: Mary Winn Carter, A.E. Carter, Richard Welby Carter
- Occupation: lawyer, politician

John A. Carter (November 15, 1808 – 1890) was a Virginia lawyer, farmer and politician, who represented Loudoun County, Virginia in both houses of the Virginia General Assembly for two terms each both before and after the American Civil War, as well as in the Virginia Constitutional Convention of 1850 and the Virginia Secession Convention of 1861.

== Early and family life ==
Carter was born at Sabine Hall, Richmond County, Virginia in 1808 to Col. Landon Carter III and his second wife, the former Mary Burwell Armistead. Both his parents descended from the First Families of Virginia. After private education locally, he attended boarding school at Phillips Academy in Andover, Massachusetts, then began studies at the University of Virginia but was expelled after a rules violation. He then studied law under Henry St. George Tucker Sr. in Winchester from 1827 until 1829.

He married orphan Richardetta Louisa De Butts (whose guardian was local leader John P. Dulany) in Loudoun County on February 12, 1834. His wife died young, as did their daughter Mary Winn Carter (1838-1839) and an infant son Edgar Marshall Carter, although one son (Confederate Col. Richard Welby Carter (1837-1889)) survived the war but was outlived by this man, his father.

== Career ==
The Virginia Capitol at Richmond where 19th century Conventions met

After admission to the Virginia bar, Carter began practicing law in his native Richmond County, then relocated to Middleburg in Loudoun County, Virginia, and practiced in Leesburg, the county seat.

Carter also farmed using enslaved labor. Initially, Carter farmed near the border between Fauquier and Loudoun counties, but eventually moved to his late father-in-law's Virginia estate, which he probably named "Crednal" after his grandmother's Hertfordshire village, after his wife's mother died in 1845. John A. Carter owned 28 enslaved people in 1840, 13 enslaved black people in 1850, and 25 enslaved people in 1860. In the 1860 federal census, Carter owned $37,000 in real property and 26,585 in personal property, including slaves, and his household also included his son R. W. Carter, Elizabeth Simpson (aged 52 and with $8000 in real property and $5000 in personal property) as well as her daughter Virginia.

Loudoun County voters twice elected Carter to two terms in the Virginia House of Delegates, once before and once after the American Civil War discussed below. He first won election in 1842 alongside William H. Gray and Daniel Miller, then won re-election in 1843, but this time along with John Grubb and A. Sidney Tebbs.

In 1850, Loudoun County voters elected Carter to the Virginia Constitutional Convention of 1850, as one of their three delegates. Despite his Tidewater ancestry, he spoke in favor of universal white manhood suffrage and for allowing western Virginia counties a majority in the House of Delegates.

Carter was then elected to the state Senate in 1859, serving part of that single term before the American Civil War.

A Unionist in the Virginia Secession Convention of 1861, as was his fellow Loudoun delegate, John Janney (the convention's president), Carter voted against secession during both the votes on April 4 and April 17. Shortly after Virginia (and Loudoun County's voters) voted for secession, his Virginia Military Institute educated son, Richard Welby Carter, who had already organized a cavalry company to defend his northern Piedmont region, volunteered to join the Confederate States Army. The younger Carter would serve until nearly the war's end, despite two terms as prisoner of war, rising in rank from Captain of Company H of the 1st Virginia Cavalry to Major, Lt. Col. and finally Colonel, although at war's end he was imprisoned at the Old Capital prison in Washington D.C. and at Camp Delaware. He was ultimately pardoned and married, but died before his father. The family's farm, Crednal, was near the heart of the Battle of Unison in 1862, as well as during the Battle of Upperville, and was probably burned during the fall of 1864 by troops under Maj. Gen. Wesley Merritt because of Carter's hospitality toward J.E.B. Stuart in 1862 and John Singleton Mosby.

Nearly a decade after the American Civil War, Loudoun County voters returned Carter to the Virginia House of Delegates. He won election as a Conservative in 1873, and took office on the following New Year's Day alongside Mathew Harrison. He won re-election in 1875, this time alongside William Mathew, who was left out of the 1873 election. However, unrelated former CSA Capt. John R. Carter of Mountville who had owned 11 slaves before the war and whom voters had previously rejected, defeated Carter in 1877.

== Death ==
Although Carter spent his final years at Crednal, which was improved in the 1870s, the 1880 census lists him at his son Richard W. Carter's home, Mercer (also in Loudoun County), with his daughter-in-law Sophie and their children. John Armistead Carter died at Crednal in 1895, survived by several grandchildren and Welby Carter's widow Sophie, who continued to manage Crednal until her death in 1928. John Armistead Carter is buried at the private Carter family cemetery at Crednal, as would be his granddaughter Fannie Carter Marshall (1871-1945). Nearby Willisville, Virginia may have been founded by former slaves from Crednal, which also has a slave graveyard with only one marker.
