= Willisville =

Willisville is the name of some places in North America:

Canada

- Willisville, Ontario

United States

- Willisville, Arkansas
- Willisville, Illinois
- Willisville, Indiana
- Willisville, Virginia
- previous name for Cornwall-on-Hudson, New York
