= Civil War Museum =

Civil War Museum can refer to:

For the American Civil War:

- African American Civil War Memorial, in Washington, D.C.
- American Civil War Museum, in Richmond and Appomattox, Virginia
- American Civil War Center at Historic Tredegar
- Civil War Museum (Bardstown)
- Civil War Museum of Philadelphia
- Kenosha Civil War Museum
- National Civil War Museum in Harrisburg, Pennsylvania
- National Civil War Naval Museum at Port Columbus
- New England Civil War Museum
- Taggart Hall Civil War Museum & Visitors Center
