= Stewart–Lee House =

Historic house in Virginia, United States

- U.S. National Register of Historic Places
- Virginia Landmarks Register
- Richmond City Historic District
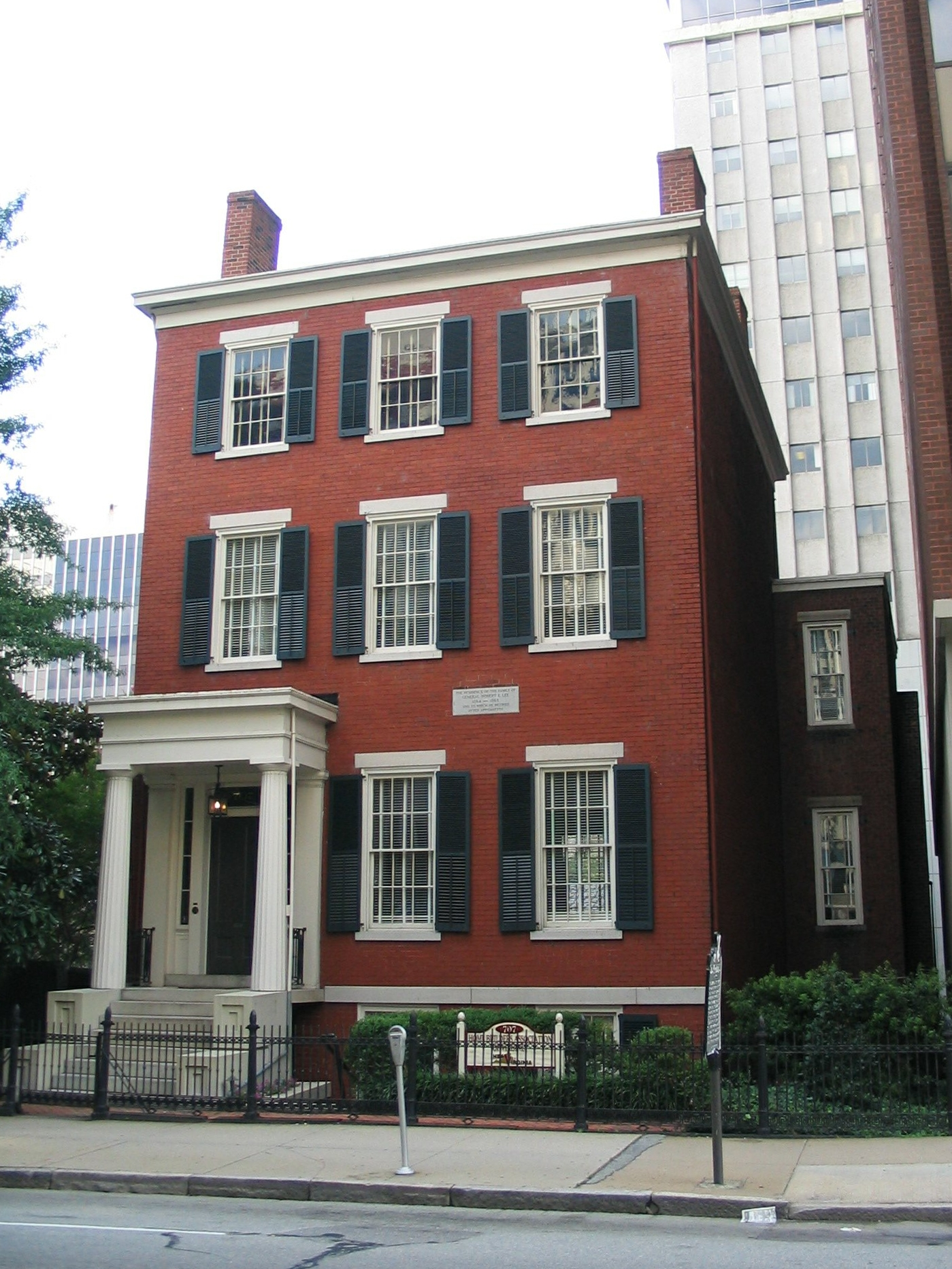
- Stewart–Lee House, July 2011

- Location within Virginia Location within the United States
- Location: 707 E. Franklin St., Richmond, Virginia
- Coordinates: 37°32′23″N 77°26′14″W
- Area: 9.9 acres (4.0 ha)
- Built: 1844
- Built by: Stewart, Norman
- Architectural style: Greek Revival
- NRHP reference No.: 72001527
- VLR No.: 127-0064

Significant dates
- Added to NRHP: May 5, 1972
- Designated VLR: January 18, 1972

Stewart–Lee House, also known as the Norman Stewart House, is a historic home located in Richmond, Virginia. It was built in 1844, and is a three-story, three-bay, Greek Revival style brick townhouse. Its low hipped roof is pierced by four interior end chimneys and surrounded by a simple molded cornice with a plain frieze. In 1864, Robert E. Lee's wife and daughter occupied the house after the confiscation of "Arlington." On April 15, 1865, General Lee retired to the home following the surrender at Appomattox. He resided there only until June 1865, due to the "result of constant callers." In 1893, the building was given to the Virginia Historical Society "for the use and occupation of the Virginia Historical Society as a library and assembly rooms"; they occupied it until 1959. The house was conveyed to the Confederate Memorial Literary Society in 1961, and was listed on the National Register of Historic Places in 1972.
