= Virginia Piedmont Heritage Area Association =

American nonprofit preservation and historic organization

- Predecessor: Mosby Heritage Area Association
- Formation: 1995
- Founded at: Middleburg, Virginia, U.S.

The Virginia Piedmont Heritage Area Association (VPHA) is an American nonprofit preservation and historic organization in Middleburg, Virginia. Founded in 1995 as the Mosby Heritage Area Association (MHAA), its mission is to educate about, and advocate for, the preservation of the historic, cultural and scenic resources in the Northern Virginia Piedmont.

== Name and location ==
MHAA took its original name from Confederate Cavalry officer John S. Mosby, whose rangers fought throughout the region during the American Civil War. During the Civil War the area was known as Mosby's Confederacy. In August 2020, the MHAA changed its name to the Virginia Piedmont Heritage Area Association. According to VPHA Chairman C. Dulany Morison, "We have decided to respectfully retire our name and adopt one that more accurately captures the broad scope of our mission to highlight all the diverse history, from the time of the Native Americans through the twentieth century, that has taken place in the heritage area."

The Mosby Heritage Area, located about one hour's drive west of Washington, D.C., is bounded by the Bull Run Mountains to the east, the Blue Ridge Mountains to the west, the Potomac River to the north and the Rappahannock River to the south. It encompasses the Virginia counties of Loudoun, Fauquier, Clarke, Warren and part of Prince William, some 1,800 square miles (4,700 km^{2}).

Portions of Evergreen Mill Road in Leesburg, in the heart of the heritage area, were once part of the historic Old Carolina Road, one of the most heavily trafficked colonial roadways in Virginia. That road originally functioned as a north–south migration route for Native Americans, who also followed the buffalo along the route of what is now U.S. Route 50 (John S. Mosby Highway). Route 50 and Braddock Road in colonial times were the main east–west corridors linking the port city of Alexandria to Winchester.

== Historic preservation ==
The association campaigns for the preservation of historic buildings and landscapes. MHAA was instrumental in adding the historically black rural hamlet of Willisville, Virginia to the National Historic Register.

== Landscape preservation ==
The VPHA has been an active voice in discussions about development policy in the region. C. Dulany Morison was elected chairman of MHAA in 2019, pledging that his top priority would be to solidify MHAA's leadership role in efforts to preserve the Northern Piedmont area, threatened by a wave of requests by developers for special exemptions. The Heritage Association helps fund conservation easements.

== VPHA programs ==
The association offers a wide range of lectures and tours on diverse historical topics. VPHA also provides in-classroom history presentations for students across the heritage area on topics including the Revolutionary War, Civil War, and the civil rights movement.

== See also ==
- List of historical societies in Virginia
