= Andrew Wodrow =

Scottish American merchant, militia officer, clerk of court, lawyer, and landowner

Clerk of Court for Hampshire County
- In office 1782–1814
- Preceded by: Gabriel Jones
- Succeeded by: Samuel McGuire

Personal details
- Born: 1752 Glasgow, Scotland, Kingdom of Great Britain
- Died: 1814 (aged 61–62) Romney, Virginia (now West Virginia), United States
- Resting place: Old Presbyterian Cemetery (demolished), Romney, West Virginia, United States
- Spouse: Mary Ann Wilson Wodrow
- Relations: Robert Wodrow (father); George Wilson (father-in-law); Alexander Wodrow (uncle)
- Children: Matilda Wodrow McDowell; Craig Wodrow; Emily Jean Wodrow Kercheval; Elizabeth Wodrow Dailey
- Occupation: merchant; militia officer; clerk of court; lawyer; landowner

Military service
- Allegiance: United States
- Branch/service: Virginia militia Continental Army
- Years of service: 1779–1781 (Virginia militia); 1781 (Hampshire County militia); 1788 (Hampshire County militia)
- Rank: Lieutenant colonel (Virginia militia); Colonel (Hampshire County militia); Major (Hampshire County militia)
- Unit: Virginia militia Hampshire County militia
- Battles/wars: American Revolutionary War

Andrew Wodrow (Note: Wodrow's surname was occasionally spelled in contemporary records and by historians as "Woodrow", a spelling which was later adopted by some of his descendants. According to historian Peter Ross in his The Scot in America (1896): "the additional vowel [was] introduced in the name to preserve its sound, a custom which is widely prevalent, and which has helped more than aught else to obliterate many traces of the doings of the early American Scots. This fashion of altering the spelling of names is unfortunately much more common than is generally supposed.") (1752–1814) was a prominent Scottish American merchant, militia officer, clerk of court, lawyer, and landowner in the colony (and later U.S. state) of Virginia.

Wodrow was born in Scotland in 1752 and immigrated to Virginia in 1768. In Fredericksburg, he engaged in a thriving import business. Following the outbreak of the American Revolutionary War, Wodrow placed his entire inventory up for public auction and contributed the profits to the American Revolutionary patriot cause. During the war, Wodrow served as a lieutenant colonel in command of cavalry in the Continental Army.

Wodrow was the first resident clerk of court for Hampshire County, Virginia (now West Virginia), a position in which he served for a tenure lasting 32 years (1782–1814). There, Wodrow served in the position of major in the Hampshire County militia. In addition, he represented Hampshire County at the Virginia Ratifying Convention, held to ratify the United States Constitution in 1788. He was appointed by the Virginia General Assembly as a trustee of the towns of Romney and Watson Town (present-day Capon Springs). Wodrow amassed numerous properties which included landholdings along the Cacapon River and the Wilson-Wodrow-Mytinger House in Romney, and became a prosperous landholder in Hampshire County.

== Early life and education ==
Andrew Wodrow was born in Scotland, possibly in Glasgow, in 1752. He was descended from a family of scholars and professors. His father Robert Wodrow was a historian of the Church of Scotland with a "national reputation" and published his history in 1752, the same year as Wodrow's birth. Two other members of Wodrow's family filled, in succession, the "chair of theology" at the University of Glasgow and another Wodrow family member served as the university's librarian. Wodrow immigrated to the Colony of Virginia in 1768.

== Business career ==
During the 1770s, Wodrow established and expanded what became a thriving import business in Fredericksburg. Following the outbreak of the American Revolutionary War, he abandoned his business rather than import and sell goods from the Kingdom of Great Britain. He placed his entire inventory of British goods up for public auction in January 1775 and contributed the resulting profits totaling 19 pounds and 14 shillings to the American Revolutionary patriot cause in Boston. Wodrow became affiliated with the King George Association of 1770, which called on "every freeholder" in King George County, Virginia, to carry the revolution through to its fullest extent.

== Political career ==
=== American Revolutionary War posts ===
Following the cessation of his import business, Wodrow was appointed to serve in the political post of clerk for the Revolutionary Committee for King George County on May 6, 1775. During the American Revolutionary War in 1779, Wodrow joined the Virginia militia where he was commissioned an officer with the rank of major and served under the Continental Army. He then served as a lieutenant colonel in command of cavalry until 1781 after which he became a member of the Society of the Cincinnati of Virginia.

Wodrow relocated from King George County to Romney in Hampshire County during the latter years of the American Revolutionary War. In 1781, Wodrow was promoted to the military rank of colonel in command of the Hampshire County militia.

=== Hampshire County Clerk of Court tenure ===
In 1782, he was elected to serve as the clerk of court for Hampshire County following the retirement of Gabriel Jones, who had been appointed by Thomas Fairfax, 6th Lord Fairfax of Cameron. Wodrow was the first clerk of court to reside in Hampshire County while serving in the post. Because of his key position as clerk, Wodrow performed a significant role in the conveying and settling of lands in Hampshire County.

On January 10, 1788, Wodrow was recommended to the position of major in the Hampshire County militia. Later, in March 1788, Wodrow, along with Ralph Humphreys, was elected to represent Hampshire County at the Virginia Ratifying Convention held to ratify the United States Constitution. The Virginia Ratifying Convention convened in Richmond in June 1788, with Wodrow and Humphreys both voting "aye" in favor of ratification.

During the lead up to the War of 1812, Wodrow chaired an anti-war meeting in Hampshire County at which those assembled objected to a heedless rush to war with the British, which was in line with contemporary Federalist principles. According to historian Stuart L. Butler, Wodrow and the meeting's attendees felt that:

to involve [the United States] in an expensive and uncertain war, for purposes not absolutely necessary, and entail taxes and misery on ourselves and our posterity, when we might enjoy the blessings of peace and plenty and a good price for our produce on terms as honorable at least as those for the last fifteen years past, would appear to them the extreme of folly, little short of madness.

Wodrow and the committee believed that within two years of the war's beginning, it would become unpopular because of the need for increased taxation and prolonged military service. Wodrow and the committee stated, "the nation would rise in its constitutional strength, and say to those who brought about such an unpropitious state of things, 'depart from ye wicked.'"

Wodrow served as the clerk of court for Hampshire County for a tenure spanning 32 years until his death at his residence in Romney in 1814. Following his death, Wodrow's son-in-law Samuel McGuire served the remainder of his term for fifteen months until 1815 when he was succeeded by John Baker White. West Virginia historian Wilmer L. Kerns said of Wodrow in Hampshire County, West Virginia, 1754–2004 (2004) that he "was a prominent and scholarly man, successful in his business, and a good politician."

== Land affairs and holdings ==
In 1782, Wodrow served as an executor of the last will and testament of his uncle Alexander Wodrow, a wealthy merchant, and sold his personal estate, a moiety of two land lots in Falmouth, and 212 acres (0.86 km^{2}) along the Rappahannock River in Stafford County to pay his uncle's debts, with the remainder of the proceeds directed to his other family members. Wodrow sought permission from the Virginia General Assembly to sell the remainder of Alexander Wodrow's landholdings in Frederick, Hampshire, and Stafford counties, which he was granted. In addition to his landholdings, Wodrow was also charged with the sale of his uncle's slaves, furniture, watches, buckles, and several personal items. Wodrow personally inherited his uncle's riding horse and "wearing apparel."

After his move to Romney, Wodrow began to amass numerous properties and became a prosperous landholder in Hampshire County. In 1788, Wodrow purchased a land tract consisting of 100 acres (0.40 km^{2}) along the Cacapon River in Hampshire County. On December 4, 1789, Wodrow was appointed by an act of the Virginia General Assembly as a trustee of the town of Romney. He served as a trustee alongside Isaac Miller, Isaac Parsons, Stephen Colvin, Jonathan Purcell, Nicholas Casey, William McGuire, Perez Drew, and James Murphy. Wodrow and his fellow trustees were given authority by the Virginia General Assembly to settle disputes regarding the town's land lots and to "open and clear" the town's "streets and lanes" in accordance with the original survey and plan for Romney. Wodrow was again appointed by an act of the Virginia General Assembly on December 27, 1800, to a second board of trustees governing Watson Town (present-day Capon Springs), and charged with laying off land lots, streets, and a half-acre lot containing the mineral spring for public use along Capon Springs Run. On October 4, 1808, Wodrow and fellow trustee Henry Beattie conveyed Lot No. 2 in Watson Town to Lawrence Augustine Washington a nephew of then former President George Washington. The location of Watson Town is the present-day site of Capon Springs Resort.

=== Wilson-Wodrow-Mytinger House ===
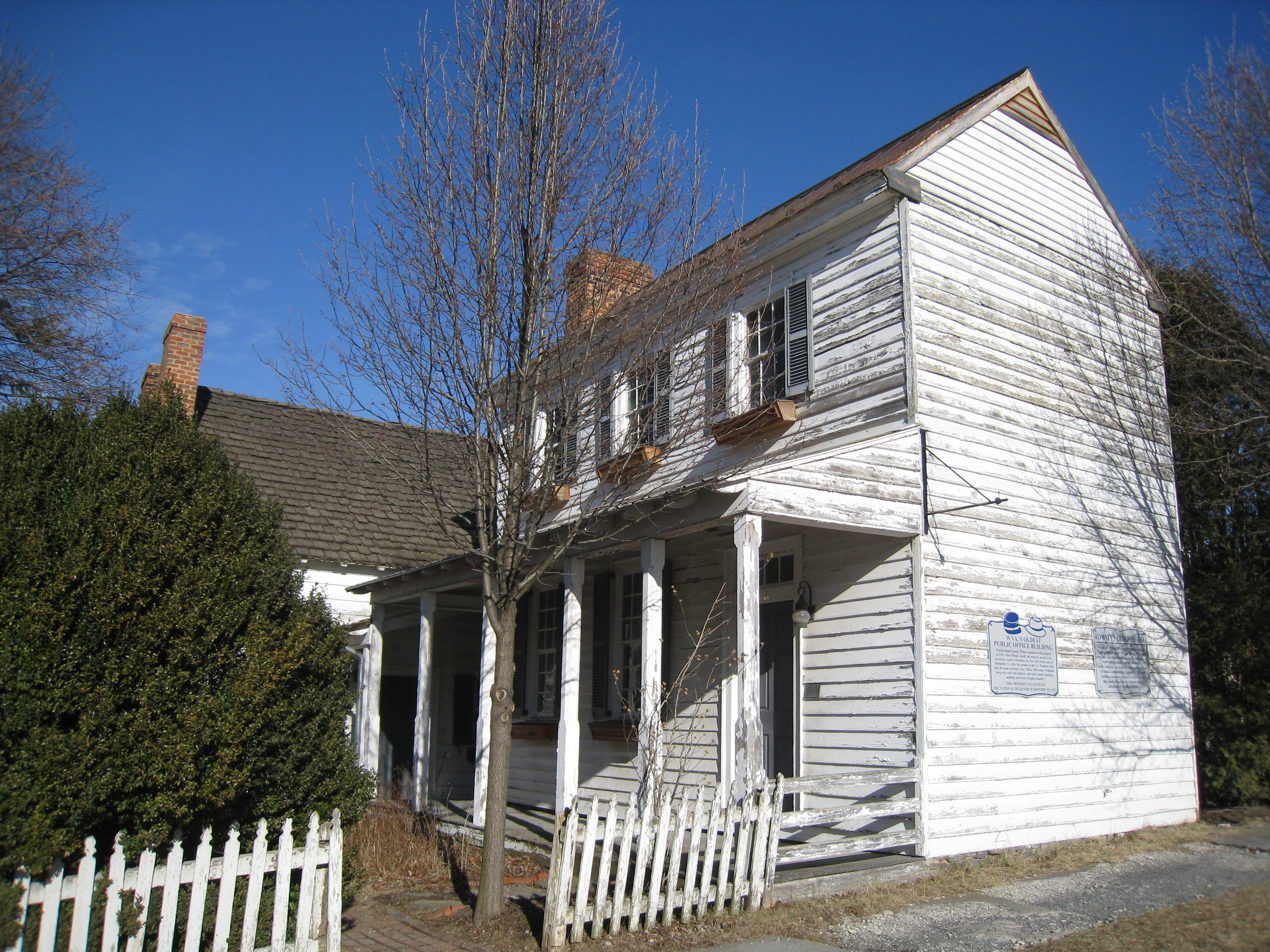
In the 1780s, Wodrow built his "clerk's office" (pictured) adjacent to his residence in Romney. Together with the kitchen building, the three structures constitute the Wilson-Wodrow-Mytinger House.

Wodrow and his wife Mary Ann inherited her father Colonel George Wilson's residence on the eastern boundary of Lot 48 in Romney following his death in 1777 and made it their home. During the 1770s and 1780s, Wodrow's residence was located on what was then the "main street" in Romney, presently known as Gravel Lane. During his tenure as clerk of court, Wodrow constructed a two-and-one-half story office building adjacent to this residence and its kitchen, all three of which are extant and contribute to the structure presently known as the Wilson-Wodrow-Mytinger House at 51 West Gravel Lane. The adjoining edifice, built by Wodrow for the handling of his clerk of court affairs, is believed to be the oldest extant public office building within the present-day state of West Virginia. Wodrow "went to great expense to add beauty and dignity" to his office building, incorporating architectural styles of panelling and woodworking prevalent in both Fredericksburg and Williamsburg. Following Wodrow's death, his residence was owned by his son-in-law John McDowell.

=== Old Presbyterian Church and Churchyard ===
Wodrow was a dynamic and influential member of the Presbyterian Church, and in his will, he granted two land lots (Lots No. 59 and No. 60) south of West Gravel Lane from his residence for the construction of Romney's first Presbyterian church building and the establishment of a cemetery. Wodrow's executor, James Dailey, deeded the two land lots on April 1, 1816, to Mount Bethel Congregation trustees James Beach, William Inskeep, Adam Hare, and John Lawson for these purposes. Wodrow was interred in this cemetery (later known as "the Old Presbyterian Cemetery") which was located atop the hill of the two lots. The Presbyterian church was built near the corner of West Gravel Lane and South High Streets between 1812 and 1816. The Old Presbyterian Cemetery fell into neglect by the late 19th century and was destroyed around 1940 when the hill on which it was located was cut away and leveled for the construction of a factory. Although some human remains and headstones were relocated to Indian Mound Cemetery, Wodrow's remains were likely lost during the destruction of the cemetery.

== Personal life ==
=== Marriage and issue ===
Wodrow married Mary Ann Wilson, the daughter of Colonel George Wilson. Wodrow and his wife Mary Ann had at least five children: Matilda Wodrow McDowell, married to John McDowell; an unnamed daughter, married to Samuel McGuire; Craig Wodrow; Emily Jean Wodrow Kercheval, married to lawyer Samuel Kercheval, Jr., son of Virginia historian Samuel Kercheval; and Elizabeth Wodrow Dailey, married to James Dailey. Wodrow's son, Craig Wodrow, was a scholar, but due to his chronic poor health, he was unable to pursue active roles in business or politics. Craig Wodrow was also interred in the Old Presbyterian Cemetery in Romney.

== Bibliography ==
- Bennett, Diana Kercheval (2003). The Kerchevals in America. Virginia: Diana Kercheval Bennett. ISBN 9780788436369. OCLC 56133919. Archived from the original on January 1, 2014.
- Brannon, Selden W., ed. (1976). Historic Hampshire: A Symposium of Hampshire County and Its People, Past and Present. Parsons, West Virginia: McClain Printing Company. ISBN 978-0-87012-236-1. OCLC 3121468.
- Burgess, Louis Alexander (1973). Virginia Soldiers of 1776, Volume 2. Spartanburg, South Carolina: Reprint Company. ISBN 978-0-8063-0529-5. OCLC 572677. Archived from the original on January 1, 2014.
- Butler, Stuart Lee (2012). Defending the Old Dominion: Virginia and Its Militia in the War of 1812. Lanham, Maryland: University Press of America. ISBN 978-0-7618-6040-2. OCLC 816563935. Archived from the original on January 1, 2014.
- Butler, Stuart Lee (2008). Real Patriots and Heroic Soldiers: General Joel Leftwich and the Virginia Brigade in the War of 1812. Westminster, Maryland: Heritage Books. ISBN 978-0-7884-4775-4. OCLC 301718834. Archived from the original on January 1, 2014.
- College of William & Mary (1897). William and Mary College Quarterly Historical Magazine. Vol. V. Richmond, Virginia: Whittet & Shepperson, General Printers. OCLC 2393831. Archived from the original on January 1, 2014.
- Darter, Oscar H. (1957). Colonial Fredericksburg and Neighborhood in Perspective. New York City, New York: Twayne Publishers. OCLC 2472845. Archived from the original on January 1, 2014.
- Eckenrode, Hamilton James (1916). The Revolution in Virginia. Boston & New York City: Houghton Mifflin. OCLC 752660498.
- Historic Romney 1762–1937. Romney, West Virginia: Federal Writers' Project, The Town Council of Romney, West Virginia. 1937. OCLC 2006735. Archived from the original on January 1, 2014.
- Grigsby, Hugh Blair (1890). Robert Alonzo Brock (ed.). The History of the Virginia Federal Convention of 1788: With Some Account of Eminent Virginians of that Era who Were Members of the Body. Richmond, Virginia: Virginia Historical Society. OCLC 60721004.
- Harris, Nancy E. (2009). King George County, Virginia 1720–1990. Baltimore: Genealogical Publishing Company. ISBN 978-0-8063-4501-7. OCLC 31489663. Archived from the original on January 1, 2014.
- Heitman, Francis Bernard (1914). Historical Register of Officers of the Continental Army During the War of the Revolution: April, 1775, to December, 1783. Washington, D.C.: Rare Book Shop Publishing Company. OCLC 20742683.
- Hening, William Waller (1823). The Statutes at Large; Being a Collection of All The Laws of Virginia, from the First Session of the Legislature, In the Year 1619, Volume IX. Richmond, Virginia: Printed for the Editor by George Cochran. OCLC 16810101.
- Horton, Vicki Bidinger (1993). Hampshire County Minute Book Abstracts, 1788–1802. Baltimore: Genealogical Publishing Company. ISBN 978-0-8063-4535-2. OCLC 33116700. Archived from the original on January 1, 2014.
- Johnston, Elizabeth Bryant (1897). Lineage Book, Volume III. Harrisburg, Pennsylvania: The Harrisburg Publishing Company. OCLC 1565972. Archived from the original on January 1, 2014.
- Lewis, Virgil Anson (1889). History of West Virginia: In Two Parts. Philadelphia: Hubbard Brothers. OCLC 4270768.
- Lewis, Virgil Anson (1892). Southern Historical Magazine: Devoted to History, Genealogy, Biography, Archæology and Kindred Subjects, Volume 1. Charleston, West Virginia: Virgil Anson Lewis. OCLC 8188307. Archived from the original on January 1, 2014.
- Maxwell, Hu; Swisher, Howard Llewellyn (1897). History of Hampshire County, West Virginia From Its Earliest Settlement to the Present. Morgantown, West Virginia: A. Brown Boughner, Printer. OCLC 680931891. OL 23304577M.
- Munske, Roberta R.; Kerns, Wilmer L., eds. (2004). Hampshire County, West Virginia, 1754–2004. Romney, West Virginia: The Hampshire County 250th Anniversary Committee. ISBN 978-0-9715738-2-6. OCLC 55983178.
- Pitts, Phillip R.; Harding, James E. (October 27, 1976). National Register of Historic Places - Nomination Form: Wilson-Wodrow-Mytinger House (PDF). West Virginia Antiquities Commission, United States Department of the Interior, National Park Service, West Virginia Division of Culture and History. Archived from the original (PDF) on October 16, 2015.
- Pulliam, David Loyd (1901). The Constitutional Conventions of Virginia from the Foundation of the Commonwealth to the Present Time. Richmond, Virginia: J. T. West. OCLC 6407098. Archived from the original on January 1, 2014.
- Ross, Peter (1896). The Scot in America. New York City: Raeburn Book Company. OCLC 12362137.
- Sydnor, Floyd Wills; Gearheart, Wilbern Shelton (1942). A History of Richmond Royal Arch Chapter No. 3, Being a Chronological Survey of the Activities of this Chapter From Its Organization, March 12, 1792, to October 2, 1941. Richmond, Virginia: Royal Arch Masons, Chapter No. 3 of Richmond, Virginia, Masonic Home Press. OCLC 4984838. Archived from the original on January 1, 2014.
- Wayland, John Walter (2006). A History of Shenandoah County, Virginia. Baltimore: Genealogical Publishing Company. ISBN 978-0-8063-8011-7. OCLC 123175328. Archived from the original on January 1, 2014.
- Wayland, John Walter (2009). The Washingtons and Their Homes. Baltimore: Genealogical Publishing Company. ISBN 978-0-8063-4775-2. OCLC 39055916. Archived from the original on January 1, 2014.
- Whyte, Donald (2009). A Dictionary of Scottish Emigrants to the U. S. A., Volume 1. Baltimore: Genealogical Publishing Company. ISBN 978-0-8063-4817-9. OCLC 44113431. Archived from the original on January 1, 2014.
- Woodworth, Robert Bell (1947). A History of the Presbytery of Winchester (Synod of Virginia): Its Rise and Growth, Ecclesiastical Relations, Institutions and Agencies, Churches and Ministers, 1719–1945. Staunton, Virginia: McClure Printing Company. OCLC 1873001. Archived from the original on June 10, 2016.

Court offices
Preceded by Gabriel Jones	Clerk of Court for Hampshire County; 1782 – 1814	Succeeded by Samuel McGuire
