= List of historical societies in Virginia =

The following is a list of historical societies in the state of Virginia, United States.

== Organizations ==
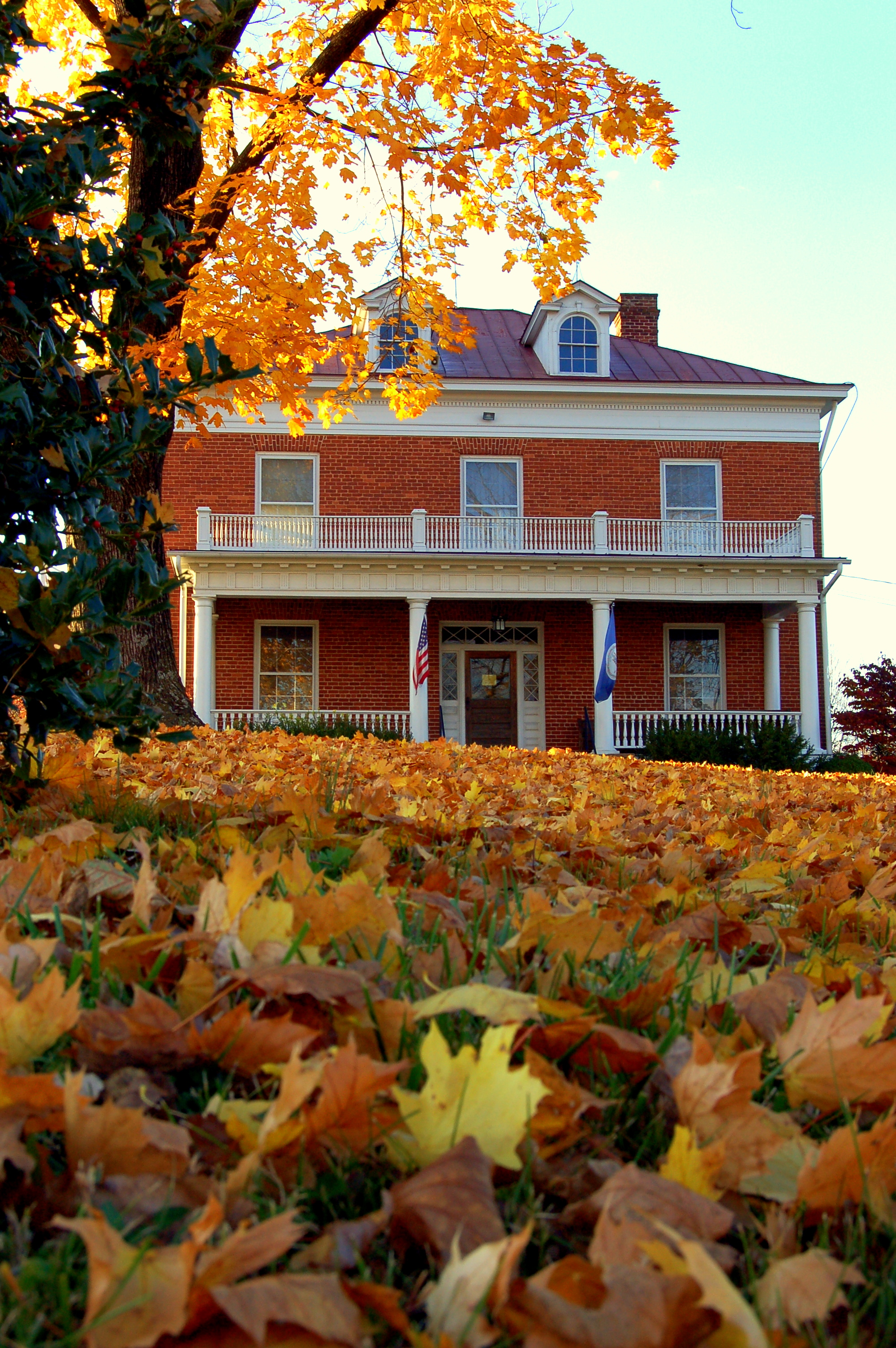
Amherst Historical Society building in Virginia (photo 2009)

- African American Historical Society of Portsmouth
- Albemarle Charlottesville Historical Society (formerly Albemarle County Historical Society)
- Alleghany County Historical Society
- Alleghany Historical Society
- Amherst County Museum & Historical Society
- Appomattox County Historical Society
- Arlington Historical Society, Virginia
- Augusta County Historical Society
- Avoca Museum and Historical Society
- Botetourt County Historical Society and Museum
- Buchanan County Historical Society
- C&O Historical Society
- Cape Charles Historical Society
- Carroll County Historical Society, Virginia
- Chesterfield Historical Society of Virginia
- Clarke County Historical Association
- Colonial Williamsburg Foundation
- Danville Historical Society
- Eastern Shore of Virginia Historical Society
- Essex County Museum and Historical Society
- Floyd County Historical Society
- Fluvanna County Historical Society
- Franklin County Historical Society, Virginia
- Giles County Historical Society
- Goochland County Historical Society
- Greene County Historical Society, Virginia
- Gum Springs Historical Society and Museum
- Harrisonburg-Rockingham Historical Society
- Henry County Historical Society
- Highland Historical Society
- King William County Historical Society
- Loudoun County Historical Society
- Louisa County Historical Society
- Lovettsville Historical Society
- Martinsville-Henry County Historical Society
- Mathews County Historical Society
- Middlesex County Museum & Historical Society
- Nelson County Historical Society
- New Kent Historical Society
- New River Historical Society
- Northern Neck of Virginia Historical Society
- Northumberland County Historical Society, Virginia
- Orange County Historical Society
- Patrick County Historical Society
- Petersburg Historical Society
- Pittsylvania Historical Society
- Rappahannock Historical Society
- Richmond Literary and Historical Association
- Rockbridge Historical Society
- Salem Museum and Historical Society
- Southampton County Historical Society
- Southern Historical Society (1869-1959) in Richmond
- Southwest Virginia Historical Society
- Suffolk-Nansemond Historical Society
- Tazewell County Historical Society
- Vinton Historical Society
- Virginia Historical Society
- Virginia Piedmont Heritage Area Association
- Historical Society of Washington County, Virginia, Inc.
- Waynesboror Heritage Foundation
- Historical Society of Western Virginia
- Winchester-Frederick County Historical Society
- Wise County Historical Society

== See also ==
- History of Virginia
- List of museums in Virginia
- National Register of Historic Places listings in Virginia
- List of historical societies in the United States
