= Crednal =

Historic house in Virginia, United States

- U.S. National Register of Historic Places
- Virginia Landmarks Register
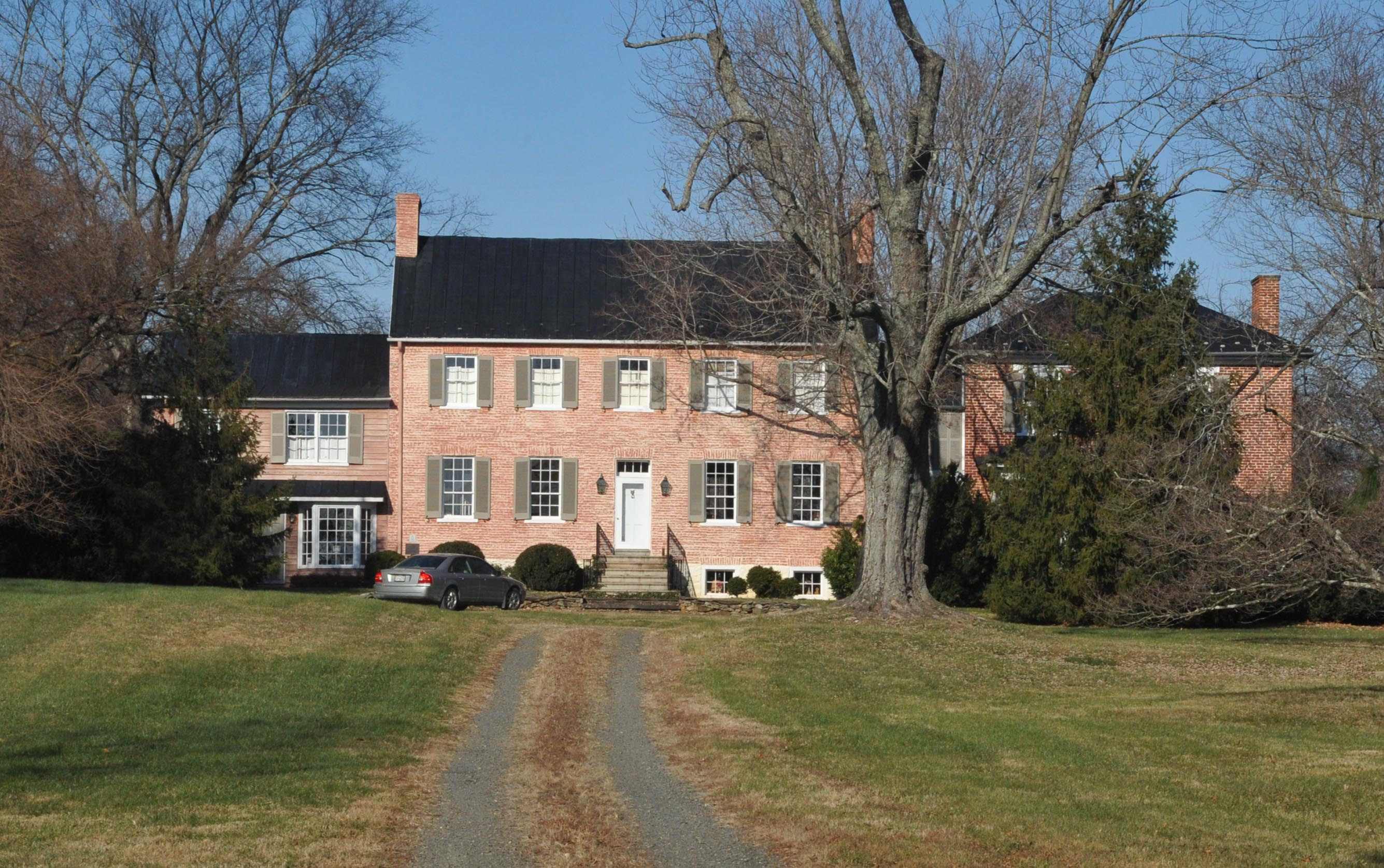

- Location within Northern Virginia Location within Virginia Location within the United States
- Location: 34500 Welbourne Rd., near Unison, Virginia
- Coordinates: 39°00′21″N 77°48′43″W
- Area: 76 acres (31 ha)
- Built: c. 1785, 1814, 1841, 1861, 1870, 1895, 1993
- Built by: John A. Carter
- Architectural style: Federal, Greek Revival
- NRHP reference No.: 11000034
- VLR No.: 053-0141

Significant dates
- Added to NRHP: February 22, 2011
- Designated VLR: December 16, 2010

Crednal is a historic home located near Unison, Loudoun County, Virginia, United States. The building is an example of an early-19th-century, Federal-style, two-story, five-bay, brick dwelling built in 1814, that was constructed around an existing 18th-century, vernacular, residential stone core. A two-story, three-bay frame wing was constructed in 1870. In 1993, a two-story, two-bay, Greek Revival-style brick dwelling that had been slated for demolition from Greene County, Virginia, was moved to the property and attached to the house by a hyphen. Also on the property are the contributing Carter family cemetery and an unmarked slave cemetery.

It was listed on the National Register of Historic Places in 2011.
