= Virginia Historical Society =

Virginia Museum of History and Culture
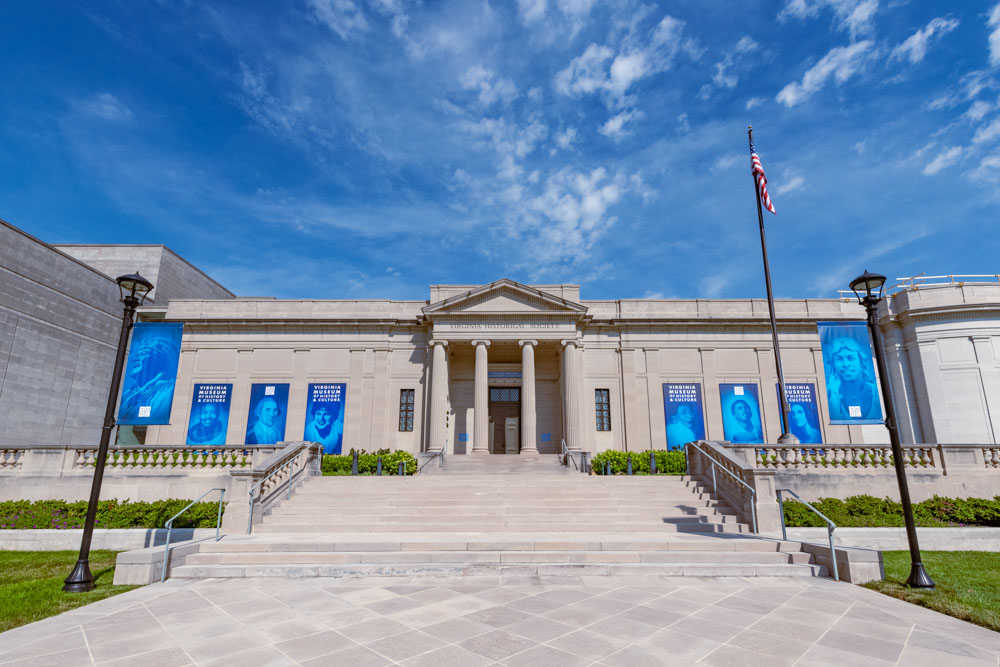
- The museum building in 2021
- Established: 1831
- Location: 428 N. Arthur Ashe Boulevard, Richmond, Virginia
- Type: History museum
- Website: Virginia Historical Society web site
- Battle Abbey
- U.S. Historic district – Contributing property
- Coordinates: 37°33′23″N 77°28′29″W
- Architectural style: Neoclassical Revival
- Part of: Boulevard Historic District (ID86002887)
- Designated CP: September 18, 1986

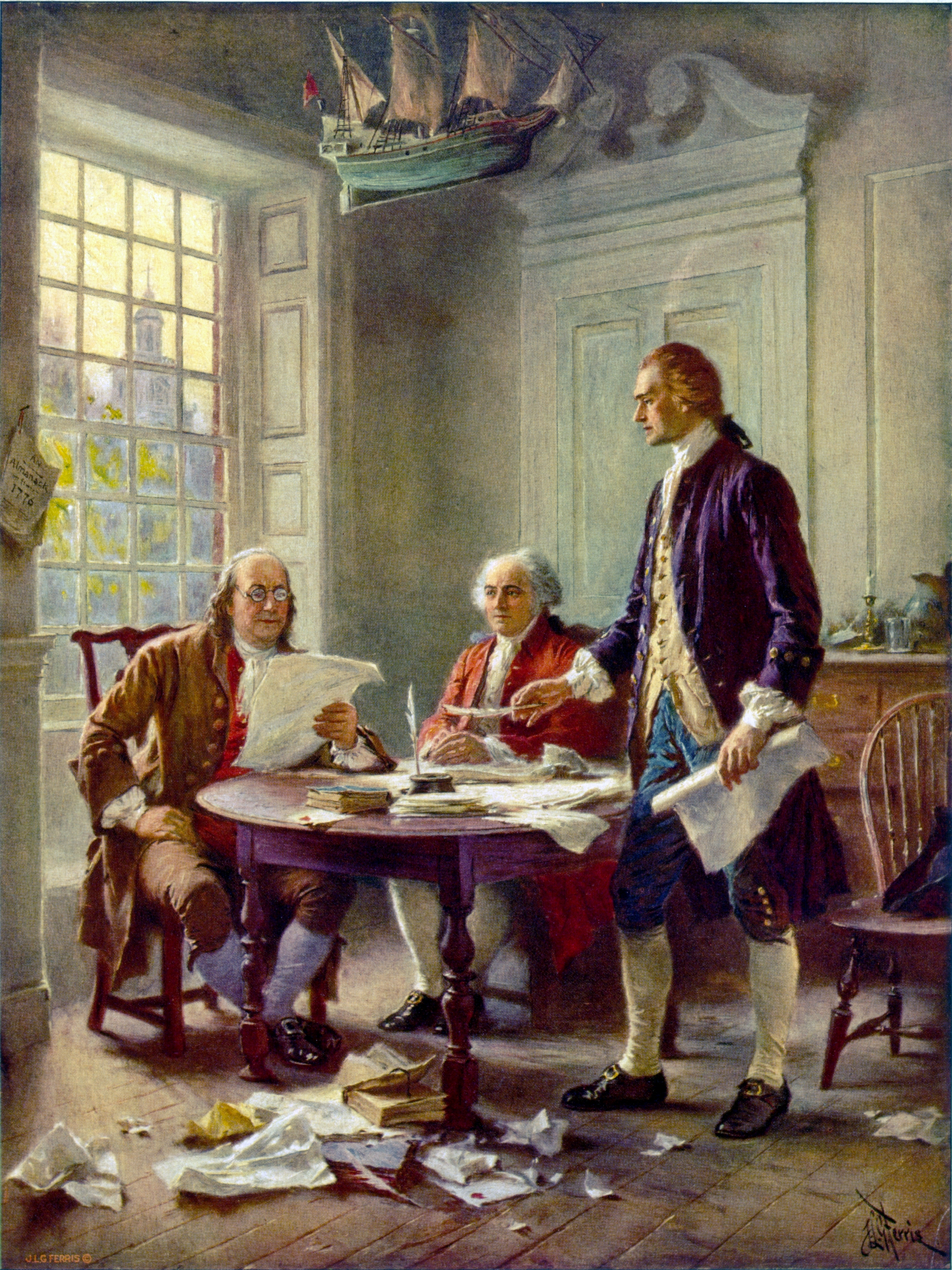
The Society houses Writing the Declaration of Independence, 1776, Jean Leon Gerome Ferris' idealized 1900 depiction of (left to right) Benjamin Franklin, John Adams, and Virginian Thomas Jefferson of the Committee of Five working on the Declaration.

The Virginia Museum of History and Culture founded in 1831 as the Virginia Historical and Philosophical Society and headquartered in Richmond, Virginia, is a major repository, research, and teaching center for Virginia history. It is a private, non-profit organization, supported almost entirely by private contributions. In 2004, it was designated the official state historical society of the Commonwealth of Virginia.

The historical society's headquarters was renamed from Virginia Historical Society to the Virginia Museum of History and Culture in 2018.

The museum features exhibitions and programming for visitors of all ages and has more than 25,000 square feet (2,300 m^{2}) of exhibition gallery space and the largest display of Virginia artifacts on permanent view. The Virginia Museum of History & Culture is the only museum with all of Virginia's history under one roof—all centuries, regions, and topics are covered.

== Mission ==
The mission of the historical society is to connect people to America's past through the unparalleled story of Virginia. By collecting, preserving, and interpreting the Commonwealth's history, the society links past with present and inspires future generations.

== History ==
On December 29, 1831, twenty-eight Virginians—consisting of political, economic, and social leaders—met in the House of Delegates chamber of the Virginia State Capitol to establish a state historical society. Christened the Virginia Historical and Philosophical Society, the new institution's mission was to preserve the memory of the commonwealth's prominent colonial and Revolutionary past at a time when Virginia was experiencing the movement of many of its citizens out of the state, which contributed to a growing sense of social upheaval and a perceived disconnection with Virginia's "golden age." To give the new historical society a boost from the very beginning, its founders elected Chief Justice John Marshall as its first president and former president James Madison its first honorary member.

In its early years, the historical society gathered an eclectic collection of natural history specimens, historical artifacts, and printed and written material. From time to time, it published the texts of historic documents and the addresses delivered at its annual meetings. This was hampered, however, by having virtually no endowment and no permanent home. In 1848, the institution shortened its cumbersome name to the Virginia Historical Society to reflect a primarily historical focus as it became more active in publishing historical material. The society gained its first permanent headquarters building in Richmond in 1893. The society's journal, the Virginia Magazine of History and Biography, has published on a quarterly basis without interruption since 1893.

In the 1950s, increasing resources allowed the addition of a professional staff. Over the next several decades the society's collections grew. The publications program also increased as the institution gained a significant role in the academic community.

In 1959, the historical society relocated from its headquarters in the Lee House on Franklin Street to Battle Abbey (constructed in 1912) on the Boulevard. To accommodate the society, a four-story wing was added to the west side of the previously expanded Battle Abbey. Since 1959, the headquarters building has been renovated and expanded several times—including a new west wing to house the extensive society research library (1992); a north wing to expand its gallery space and house offices of the Virginia Department of Historic Resources (1998); a new south wing to add additional gallery space, storage, offices, and a nearly 488-seat auditorium (2006); and new spaces for public use on the north and south sides of the building (2015).

In 1992, the society opened the Center for Virginia History, increasing its display and archival resources. Shortly thereafter, it entered into a partnership with the Virginia Department of Historic Resources, an agency of the state government, which also had significant historical holdings (both artifacts and archives), forming a unique private-public partnership.

In 2018, after nearly a year of research, community conversations, and strategic planning, the Virginia Historical Society announced a new name for its headquarters facility at 428 N. Boulevard in Richmond, Virginia—The Virginia Museum of History & Culture.

In 2019, the street on which the Virginia Museum of History & Culture is located was renamed Arthur Ashe Boulevard in honor of Arthur Ashe. Ashe grew up in Richmond, but was barred from playing tennis at the white-only courts in Byrd Park. Ashe went on to become the first black man to win major championships at Wimbledon, the U.S. Open, and the Australian Open.

== Programs ==
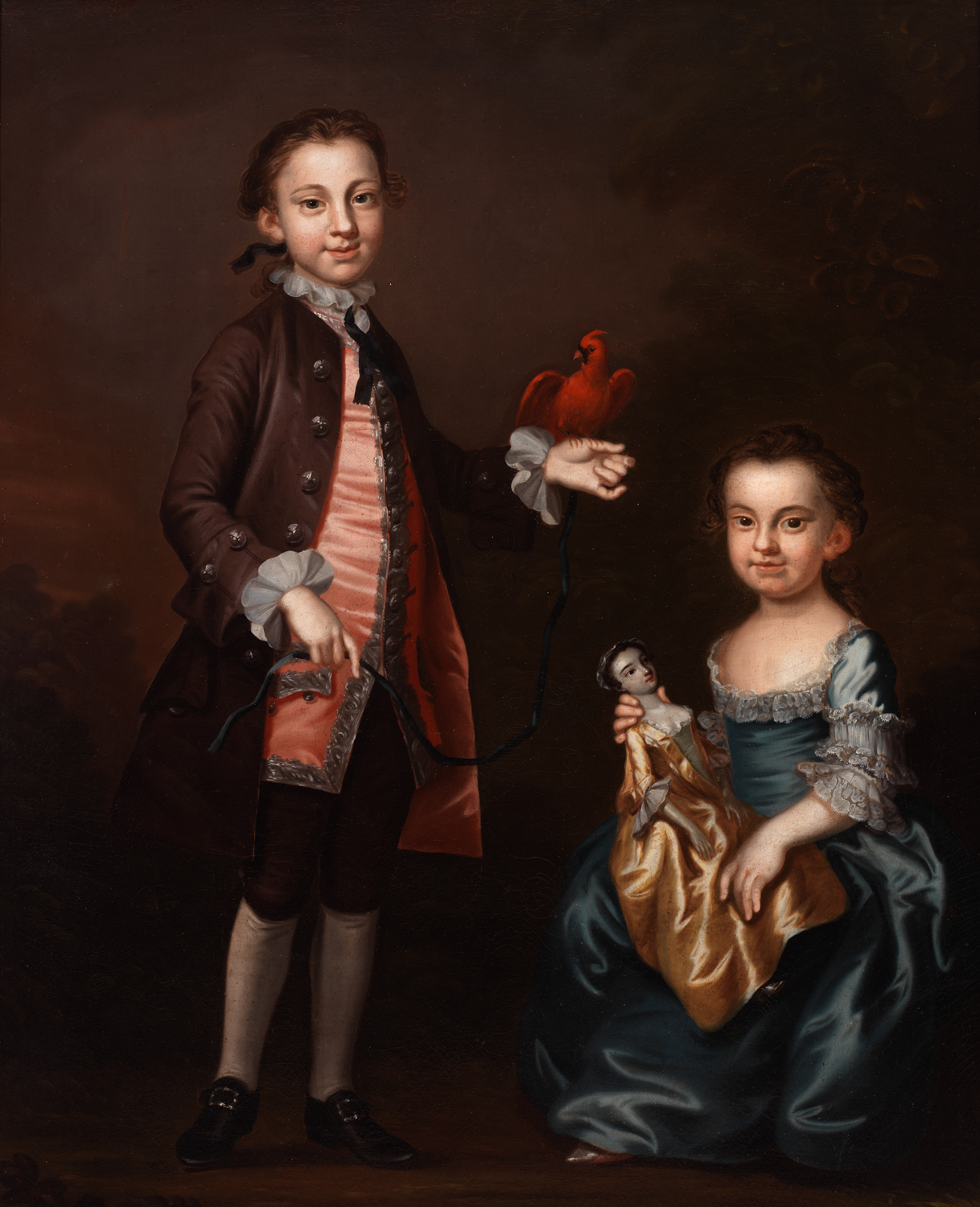
Mann Page and His Sister Elizabeth (John Wollaston, c. 1755–1758)

The Virginia Museum of History & Culture offers a wide array of educational programs, especially for students and teachers. These include outreach programs that take place in school classrooms, guided tours of exhibitions, and workshops and week-long summer institutes for teachers.

The museum offers three members-only evening lectures and around 20 noontime lectures every year that are open to the public. Audio and videos of past lectures are accessible on the web site.

Current exhibitions include The Story of Virginia, a long-term exhibition that interprets 16,000 years of Virginia history from the earliest artifacts of Native Americans to Virginia at the beginning of the 21st century.

== Virginia House ==
Virginia House
- Established: 1928
- Location: 4301 Sulgrave Road Richmond, Virginia
- Website: Virginia House web site

Virginia House, situated on a hillside overlooking the James River in Richmond, Virginia, was constructed by Alexander W. Weddell, U.S. ambassador to Spain and Argentina, and his wife, Virginia Weddell, in 1928 from the materials of a 16th-century English manor house previously standing in Warwick. It was a blend of three romantic English Tudor designs, and, for its time, was a thoroughly modern home complete with seven full baths, central heat, modern kitchen, and commodious closets.

Owned and operated by the Virginia Historical Society as a museum, the house has been preserved much as it was when the Weddells resided there. The gardens and grounds of Virginia House provide a rich tapestry of texture and color throughout the year. Almost 1,000 types of ornamental plants thrive throughout formal and naturalistic gardens.

== See also ==
- List of historical societies in Virginia
