= Taggart Hall =

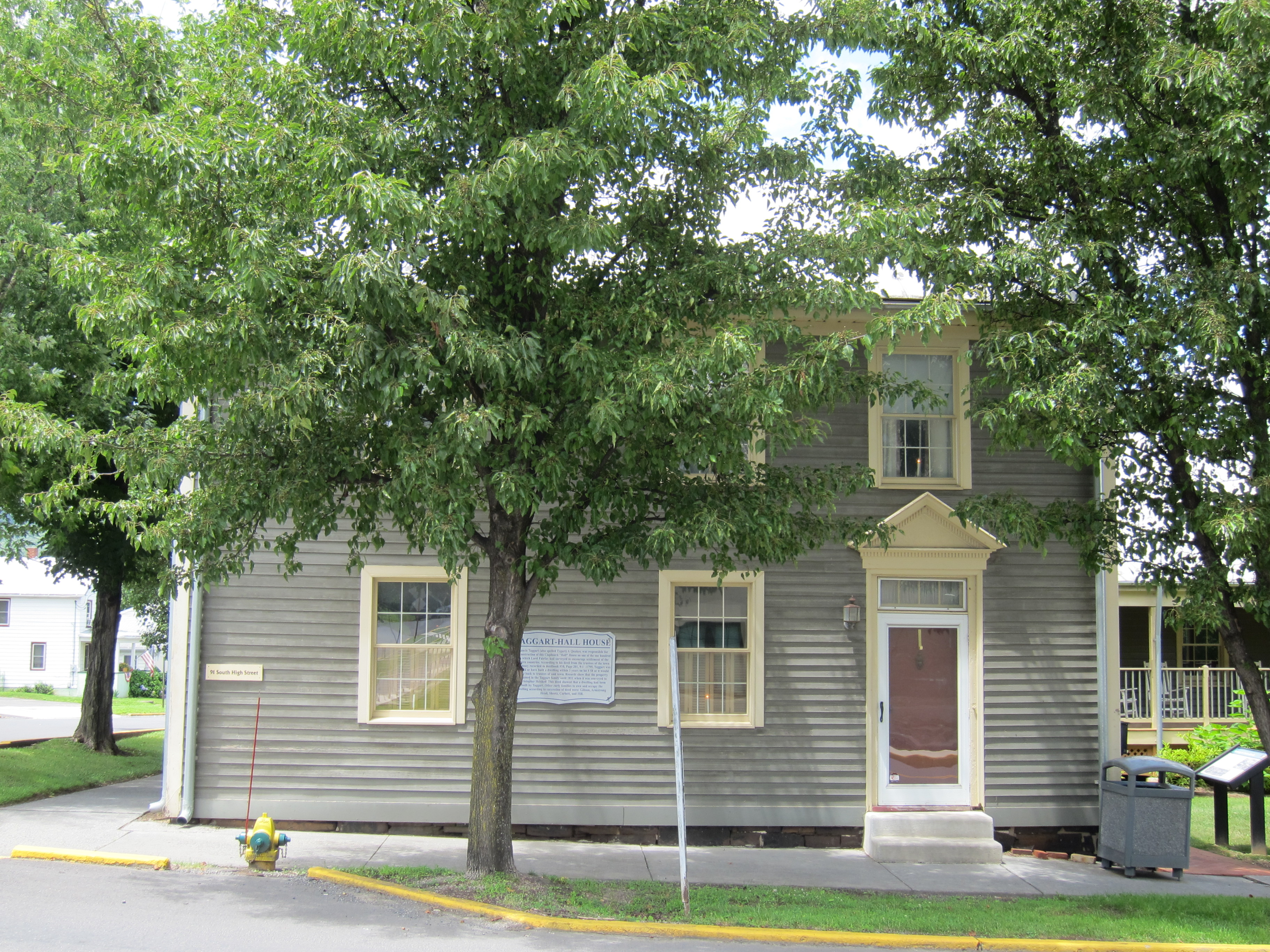
- Front elevation along South High Street in Romney

- Location within Romney, West Virginia Location within Eastern Panhandle of West Virginia Location within West Virginia Location within the United States

General information
- Type: Museum
- Location: 91 South High Street (West Gravel Lane & South High Street), Romney, West Virginia, United States
- Coordinates: 39.341148°N 78.757069°W
- Completed: c. 1790s
- Owner: Frances Taggart (Tygart); Fort Mill Ridge Foundation; Hampshire County Visitors Bureau; Hampshire County Chamber of Commerce

Taggart Hall is a late 18th-century residence that houses the Fort Mill Ridge Foundation and its Fort Mill Ridge Civil War Trenches museum. It is at 91 South High Street, Romney, West Virginia. Next to Taggart Hall on Gravel Lane is Romney's oldest structure, the Wilson-Wodrow-Mytinger House (c. 1760).

Frances Taggart (Tygart), a Quaker, constructed Taggart Hall in the 1790s on a lot at the corner of High Street and Gravel Lane laid out in the original 1762 Romney survey conducted on behalf of Thomas Fairfax, 6th Lord Fairfax of Cameron. Taggart Hall was initially built as a clapboard "half-house". The original eighteenth-century structure was expanded to accommodate the Fort Mill Ridge Foundation.

== See also ==
- List of historic sites in Hampshire County, West Virginia
