= Wilson-Wodrow-Mytinger House =

Complex of buildings in Romney, Virginia

- U.S. National Register of Historic Places
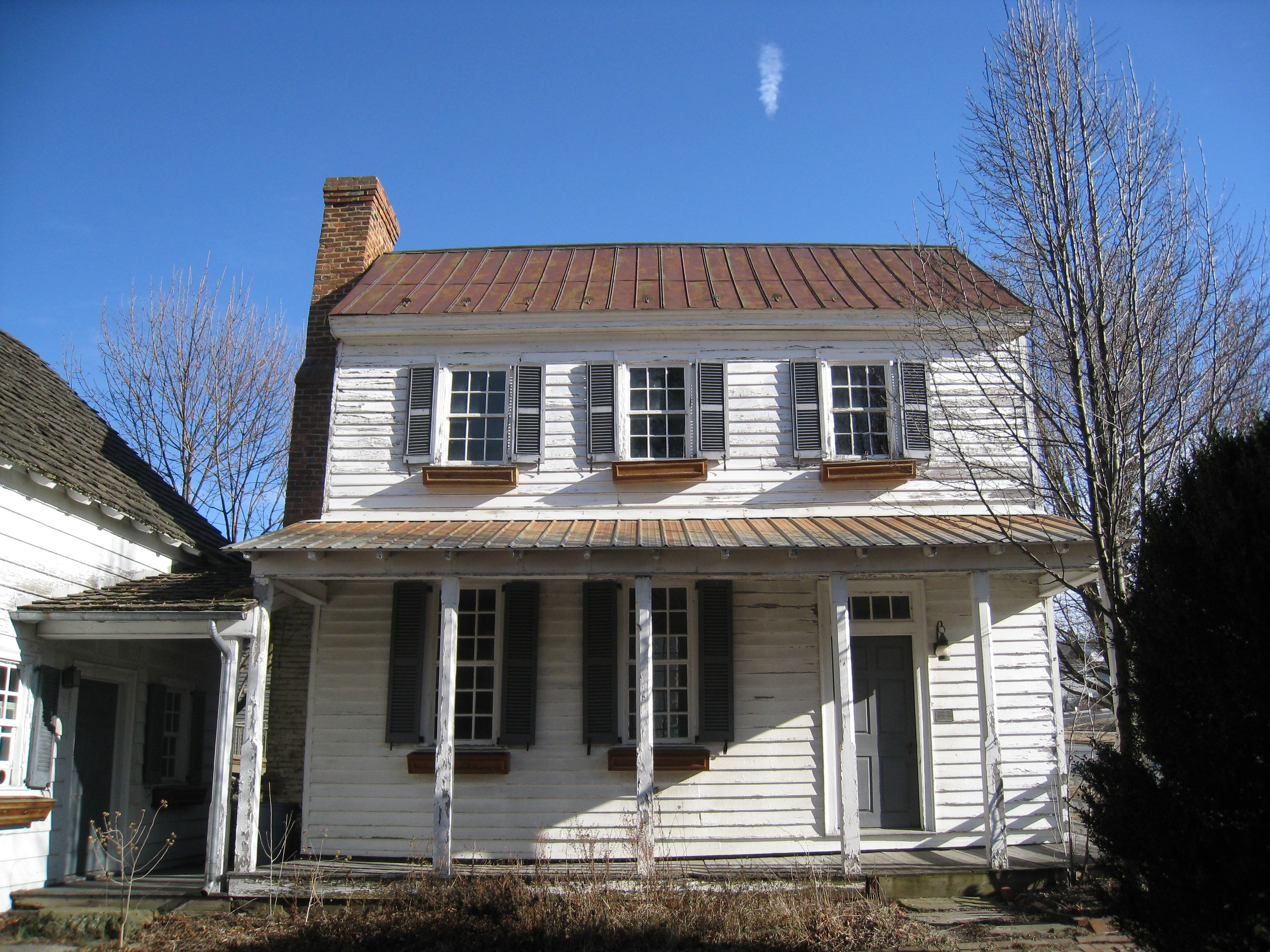
- The clerk's office (1780s) of the Wilson-Wodrow-Mytinger House

- Location within Romney, West Virginia Location within Eastern Panhandle of West Virginia Location within West Virginia Location within the United States
- Location: 51 West Gravel Lane; Romney, West Virginia, United States
- Coordinates: 39°20′29″N 78°45′27″W
- Area: 1 acre (0.40 ha)
- Built: (c. 1740s–c. 1780s); Kitchen structure (c. 1750); Clerk's office (1780s)
- Architectural style: American colonial architecture
- NRHP reference No.: 77001375
- Designated: August 22, 1977

The Wilson-Wodrow-Mytinger House is a complex of three structures, built between the 1740s and 1780s, in Romney, West Virginia, United States. The clerk's office, dating from the 1780s, is the oldest surviving public office building in West Virginia. The kitchen building (c. 1750) is the oldest remaining component of the Wilson-Wodrow-Mytinger House and the oldest building in Romney. Throughout its history, the Wilson-Wodrow-Mytinger House has been known as the Andrew Wodrow House, the Mytinger Family Home, and the Mytinger House.

The earliest person recorded residing on Lot Number 48 in Romney was Hugh Murphy. In 1763, Colonel George William Wilson received a patent to Lot Number 48 from Thomas Fairfax, 6th Lord Fairfax of Cameron, to purchase the lot from Murphy. Wilson served in the Hampshire County militia as a major during the French and Indian War. He relocated to Pennsylvania, and in 1770, George Washington spent the night in a log cabin on the northeastern corner of Lot Number 48. Andrew Wodrow arrived in Hampshire County near or after the end of the American Revolutionary War. In 1782, Wodrow became clerk of court for Hampshire County. He completed the clerk's office building in the 1780s, and the complex assumed its current configuration by 1790.

Wodrow served as Clerk of Court for Hampshire County until his death in 1814, after which ownership passed to Wodrow's son-in-law, John McDowell; a Dr. McClinoch; and the Mytinger family, who retained the property for about 100 years. Manning H. Williams purchased the house and restored it in 1962. Dr. Herbert P. Stelling purchased the Wilson-Wodrow-Mytinger House in 1973, and it opened as a museum and an arts and handicrafts shop known as Colonial Craftsmen. While under the Stelling family's ownership, the house was listed on the National Register of Historic Places in 1977. Its current owners, Old Hampshire Ltd., purchased the Wilson-Wodrow-Mytinger House in 1985.

== Geography and setting ==
The Wilson-Wodrow-Mytinger House property is at 51 West Gravel Lane in Romney, West Virginia, within the eastern section of town Lot Number 48 and the western section of Lot Number 58. Taggart Hall, a late 18th-century residence, is immediately east of the property, and serves as the headquarters for the Fort Mill Ridge Foundation, the Hampshire County Convention and Visitors Bureau, and the Hampshire County Chamber of Commerce. Across West Gravel Lane to the immediate south of the Wilson-Wodrow-Mytinger House is the parking lot of the Romney Volunteer Fire Department, which was formerly the location of the town's Old Presbyterian Church and Cemetery on Lots No. 59 and 60.

== History ==
=== Background ===
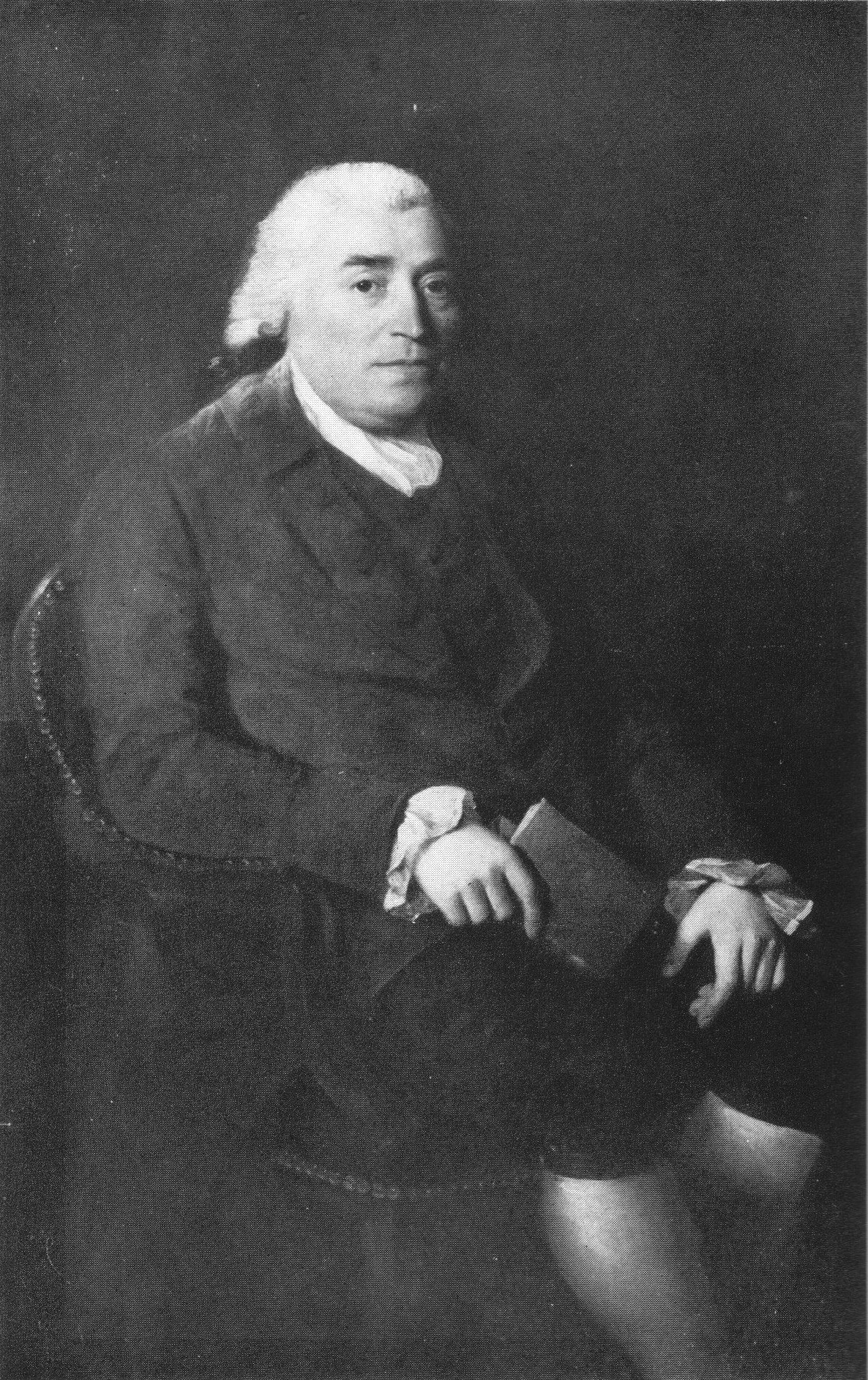
Thomas Fairfax, 6th Lord Fairfax of Cameron

The land upon which the Wilson-Wodrow-Mytinger House is located was originally part of the Northern Neck Proprietary, a land grant that the exiled Charles II awarded to seven of his supporters in 1649 during the English Interregnum. Following the Restoration in 1660, Charles II ascended to the English throne. He renewed the Northern Neck Proprietary grant in 1662, revised it in 1669, and renewed the original grant favoring original grantees Thomas Colepeper, 2nd Baron Colepeper, and Henry Bennet, 1st Earl of Arlington, again in 1672. In 1681 Bennet sold his share to Lord Colepeper, who received a new charter for the entire land grant from James II in 1688. Following the deaths of Lord Colepeper, his wife Margaret, and his daughter Katherine, the Northern Neck Proprietary passed to Katherine's son Thomas Fairfax, 6th Lord Fairfax of Cameron, in 1719.

The area surrounding present-day Romney remained sparsely populated by European settlers until the middle of the 18th century, when tensions with Native Americans began to subside. Around this time, Lord Fairfax wanted to have the lands of his Northern Neck Proprietary used and enticed European settlers to move there. His initiative led to the establishment of population centers, such as Romney. After Lord Fairfax settled at Greenway Court, he oversaw the sale and settling of his proprietary lands. One of his surveyors, George Washington, stated that a sizable number of people were residing near present-day Romney by 1748. County records indicate that Lord Fairfax began selling land within present-day Hampshire County in 1749. However, the lot's first occupant or builder is unknown. By 1754, Hampshire County was formed from parts of Frederick and Augusta counties.

Gravel Lane, the present-day street where the Wilson-Wodrow-Mytinger House is located, follows an old trail used by Native Americans prior to the arrival of European settlers. Gravel Lane was Romney's original main street, and according to the Federal Writers' Project in its Historic Romney 1762–1937 (1937), Gravel Lane "is the most historic lane in the town—and perhaps in the Northern Neck".

=== Wilson family ===
The earliest known person to own Lot Number 48, where the Wilson-Wodrow-Mytinger House is located, was Hugh Murphy. In 1763, Colonel George William Wilson received a patent to Lot Number 48 from Lord Fairfax and purchased it from Murphy. Wilson arrived in Romney between 1761 and 1763. According to George Washington's report to the House of Burgesses in 1764, Wilson served as a major in the Hampshire County militia during the French and Indian War, for which Washington praised him for his earnestness and courage. Wilson's residency in Romney was brief, and he relocated to Pennsylvania between 1764 and 1768.

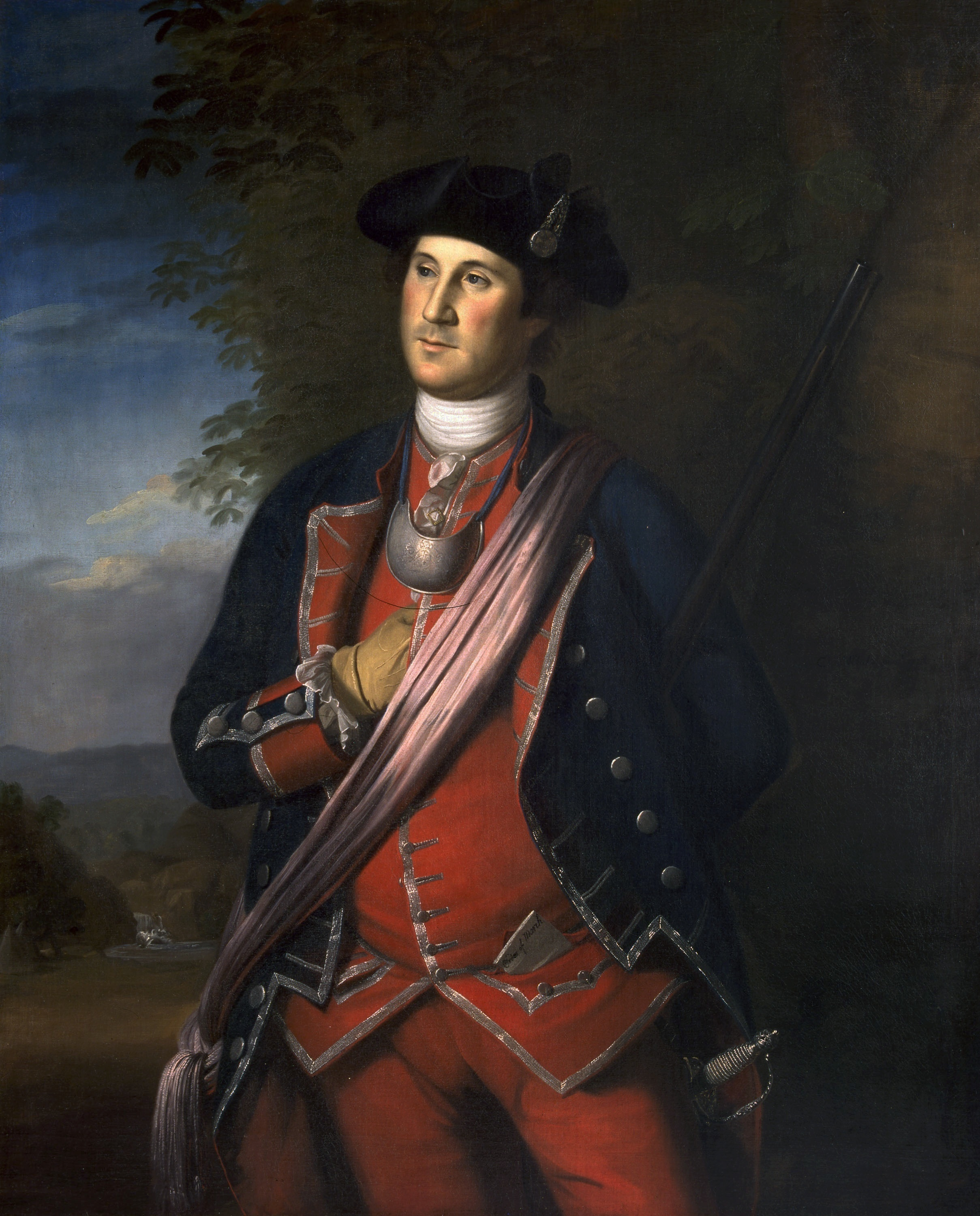
Colonel George Washington, by Charles Willson Peale, 1772

On October 9, 1770, George Washington purportedly stayed the night in an old log house at the northeastern corner of Lot Number 48. This was his final visit to Romney. In his diary, Washington wrote:

Went up to Rumney in order to buy work Horses, and meet Doctr. Craik and my Baggage; arrivd there abt. 12, distance 16 Miles. In the Afternoon Doctr. Craik and my Servt. and the Baggage, arrivd from Pritchard's; said to be 28 Miles. Having purchasd two Horses, and recoverd another which had been gone from me near 3 Years, I dispatchd my boy Giles with my two Riding Horses home, and proceeded on my journey;...

Wilson became a justice of the peace for newly established Bedford County, Pennsylvania, in 1771. He was involved in the Pennsylvania–Virginia boundary dispute, and was also selected by the Pennsylvanian faction at Fort Pitt to supervise the election of delegates to the constitutional convention from Pennsylvania. Wilson encouraged support for the American Revolution and became the lieutenant colonel of the 8th Pennsylvania Regiment during the American Revolutionary War. He died from an illness during the regiment's march to join Washington in New Jersey in January 1777. Wilson's daughter Mary Ann married Andrew Wodrow, and following Wilson's death, the Wilson-Wodrow-Mytinger House passed to his son-in-law Wodrow.

=== Wodrow family ===
Andrew Wodrow was born in 1752 in Scotland. He immigrated to the Colony of Virginia in 1768, and during the 1770s, Wodrow established and expanded a thriving import business in Fredericksburg. Following the outbreak of the American Revolutionary War, he abandoned his business rather than import and sell goods from the Kingdom of Great Britain. Wodrow was then appointed to serve in the political post of clerk for the Revolutionary Committee for King George County on May 6, 1775. He arrived in Hampshire County near or after the end of the American Revolutionary War, and in 1782, he became clerk of court for Hampshire County. Although he was the third officeholder as clerk of court, Wodrow was the first clerk to reside in Hampshire County.

As a key official, Wodrow played a significant role in the conveyance and settlement of lands and was a prosperous landholder in his own right. He is credited with giving the Wilson-Wodrow-Mytinger House complex its current form. He completed the arrangement of the three sections of the Wilson-Wodrow-Mytinger House and his association with the property lent the complex significance for its listing in the National Register of Historic Places (NRHP). In the 1780s, Wodrow built the frame structure (the last of the house's three structures) for use as a clerk's office. At that time, Gravel Lane was Romney's main street and the function and architectural beauty of the clerk's office made it a center of activity in the town. According to West Virginia Antiquities Commission research assistant Phillip R. Pitts and historian James E. Harding, the clerk's office symbolized the end of Romney's frontier existence and the beginning of a more established disposition. By the start of the 19th century, Romney and the surrounding county had become an established and settled area with a growing economy based on agriculture.

By 1790, the three structures constituting the Wilson-Wodrow-Mytinger House probably assumed their present arrangement. The trustees of the Town of Romney commissioned John Mitchel to draft a cadastral survey map of Romney in 1790. Prior to this survey, Thomas Fairfax, 6th Lord Fairfax of Cameron, had commissioned a similar cadastral survey of the town before its incorporation on December 23, 1762. On June 30, 1790, Mitchel submitted to the trustees a "Plan of the Town of Romney" that divided the town into 100 land lots of equal size, including the two lots upon which the Wilson-Wodrow-Mytinger House was located (Lots Number 48 and 58).

Wodrow remained in his post as clerk of court for Hampshire County until his death in 1814. Successive owners included Wodrow's son-in-law, John McDowell; and Dr. McClinoch, who was one of the first physicians in Romney.

=== Mytinger family ===
Tobias Mytinger acquired the property in 1861. Mytinger was active in the community affairs of Romney. He was elected a town councilman in 1874 and 1884; appointed to a committee in 1875 to assess repairs needed for the Hampshire County Courthouse; and elected to the Romney District Board of Education in 1879. Mytinger died in January 1908, and his wife Martha Virginia Mytinger continued to reside at the property until her death in January 1912. The house remained under the ownership of the Mytinger family until 1959. At the time of the property's 1959 sale, much of the complex structures' original building materials and architectural details remained extant, although in a state of deterioration. Modern conveniences, including electricity, plumbing, and a central heating system, had not been installed.

=== Williams family and restoration ===
Manning H. Williams purchased the house from the Mytinger family in 1959. Efforts to restore the Wilson-Wodrow-Mytinger House complex began in 1962 while it was under the ownership of Williams. The restoration project began with the clerk's office in June 1962. During its restoration, the structure's wooden floors, stairs, doors, woodwork, and most of its plaster were retained. Replicas of the second-story windows were fabricated, and old glass was collected from around the area and placed in their wooden sashes. Some of the structure's weatherboards were also replaced, and then the exterior of the clerk's office was painted white. Electric heating was installed, and insulation was added between the walls. During the renovation, contractors made a concerted effort to match the original or period paint colors when painting the structure's walls and woodwork.

The residential structure, also known as "the dwelling," required considerably more rehabilitation. The floor beams were rebuilt, the rafters were replaced, and a new red cedar (Juniperus virginiana) shingle roof was installed. The majority of the brickwork in its double chimneys was repaired. In the large room on the first floor, a small section of the interior eastern wall was removed to unmask the timber framing construction, and another small section was removed to reveal the hand-riven lath. Having been protected by the porch, some of the original siding on the structure's northern side was kept; replacement siding was duplicated for the remainder of the exterior and it was painted white.

The rear kitchen building was cleaned, repaired, and covered with new weatherboards, both its interior and exterior were painted white, and it was topped with cedar shakes. All the adjoining porches were rebuilt and their roofs were topped with cedar shingles. A white picket fence was built around the property's exterior, and a brick walkway was installed along the western (front) side of the clerk's office and around the residential structure to the rear of the property.

=== Stelling family and Colonial Craftsmen ===
Dr. Herbert P. Stelling of Barre, Massachusetts, purchased the Wilson-Wodrow-Mytinger House in May 1973, and in October it was opened as a museum and an arts and handicrafts shop known as Colonial Craftsmen. Stelling's daughters Rebecca, Deborah, and Rhetta Stelling, along with Gary Winkles, operated the museum and store. Colonial Craftsmen featured demonstrations of old craft skills and the sale of traditional craftsmen's wares. While under Stelling family ownership, the Wilson-Wodrow-Mytinger House was listed in the National Register of Historic Places (NRHP) on August 22, 1977—only the second historic property in Hampshire County to be listed after the Sloan–Parker House.

=== Old Hampshire, Ltd. ===
Old Hampshire, Ltd., Bob and Estelle Odle, Tom Stump, Lowell Hott, and Dottie Eddis, purchased the Wilson-Wodrow-Mytinger House in October 1985. Hott and Eddis originally planned to convert the complex into a bed and breakfast; however, since 1988, they have utilized the residential house as the Romney satellite office for their Augusta Animal Hospital veterinary clinic. Hott and Eddis have continued to maintain and restore the house, and have completed large construction projects, including a renovation of the kitchen building's crumbling stone chimney and a replacement of the 1962 roof shingles in December 2019. In a 2019 interview with the Hampshire Review regarding their continued maintenance and restoration of the property, Hott remarked, "It's really been a labor of love for us." Between 2009 and 2014, the kitchen building's stone chimney began to crumble, and it was rebuilt using some of the original stones. The cedar shingles from the 1962 restoration were replaced in December 2019.

== Old Presbyterian Church and Cemetery ==
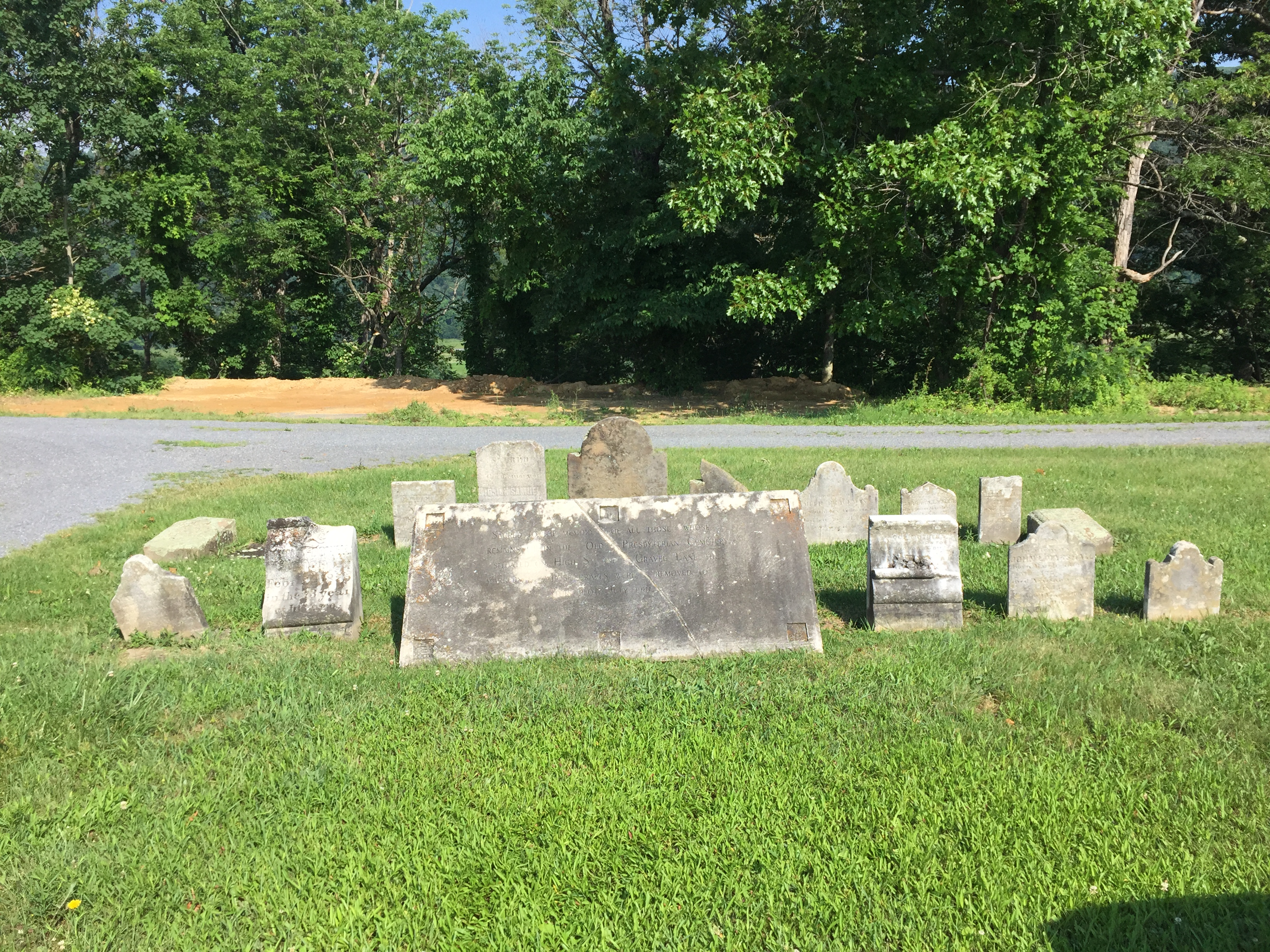
Headstones relocated to Indian Mound Cemetery from the Old Presbyterian Cemetery

Immediately south of the Wilson-Wodrow-Mytinger House, across East Gravel Lane, is the former location of Romney's Old Presbyterian Church and Cemetery. They were associated with the house, as Andrew Wodrow was a dynamic and influential member of the Presbyterian Church and granted Lots No. 59 and 60 in his will for the construction of the church and the establishment of the cemetery. On April 1, 1816, Wodrow's executor, James Dailey, deeded the two lots on to Mount Bethel Congregation trustees James Beach, William Inskeep, Adam Hare, and John Lawson for these purposes. Wodrow was interred in this cemetery located at the top of the cemetery's hill. The Presbyterian church was built near the corner of West Gravel Lane and South High Streets between 1812 and 1816. The Old Presbyterian Cemetery fell into neglect by the late 19th century and was destroyed around 1940 when the hill on which it was located was cut away and leveled for the construction of a factory. Although some human remains and headstones were relocated to Indian Mound Cemetery, Wodrow's remains were likely lost during the destruction of the cemetery.

== Architecture ==
The Wilson-Wodrow-Mytinger House is a complex of three independent structures differing in size, type of construction, building orientation, and purpose. Architectural historian S. Allen Chambers characterized the complex as, "a charmingly informal assemblage" and "wonderfully forthright". The three component structures were built between the 1740s and the 1780s, and consist of the one and one-half-story kitchen structure (c. 1750), the one and one-half-story residential structure, and the two and one-half-story clerk's office (1780s). The kitchen structure is the rear (northern) component of the Wilson-Wodrow-Mytinger House, the residential structure is the middle component, and the clerk's office is at the front (southern end) of the property along West Gravel Lane. The three structures are positioned near one another and are joined by porches on the ground level, which have enabled their use as a single building.

=== Kitchen structure (c. 1750) ===
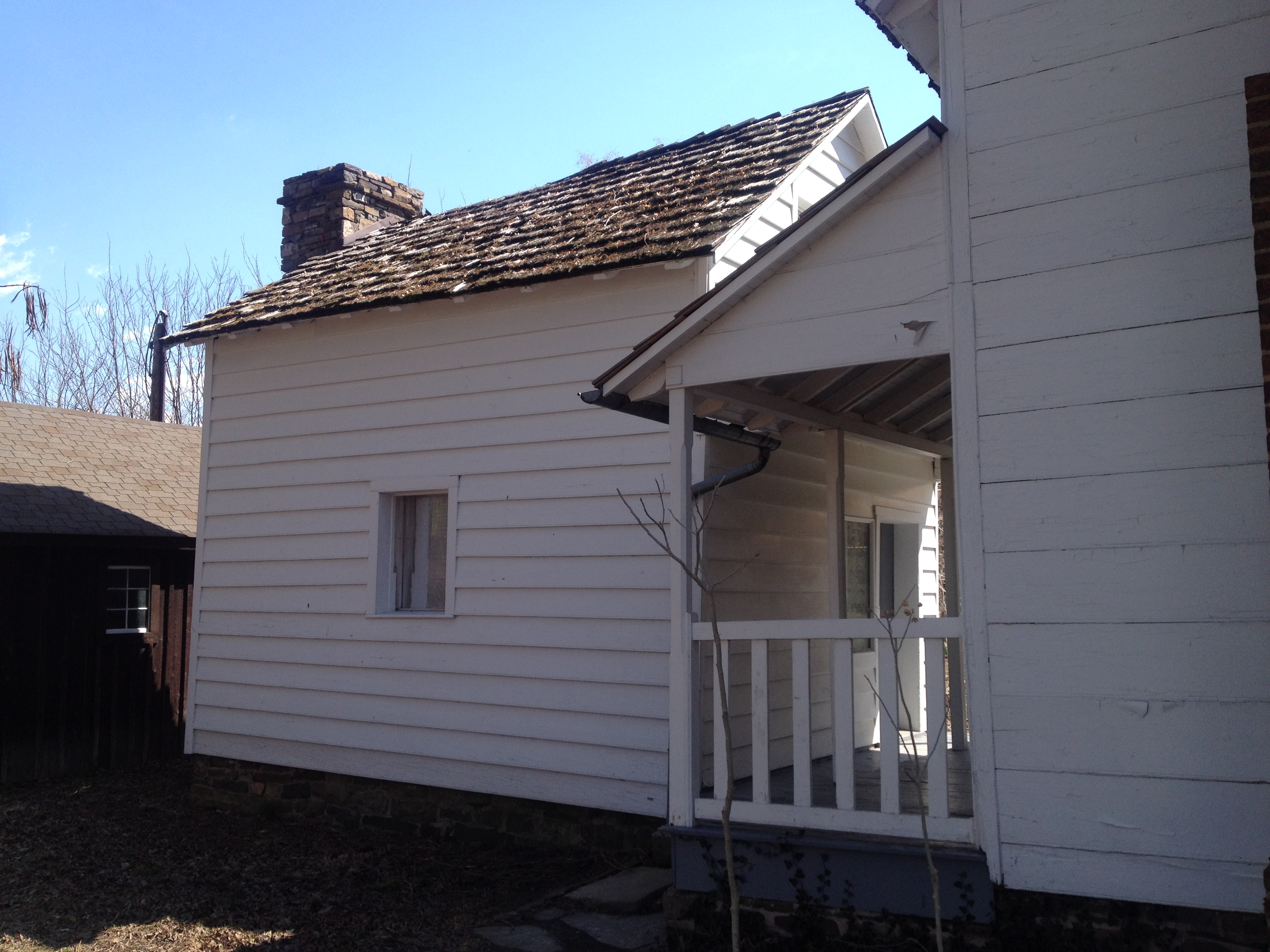
The west elevation of the kitchen structure, and the porch connecting it to the residential structure

The rear (northern) structure of the house dates from around 1750, and is thought to be the oldest extant building on the property and in Romney. It is believed to have been a kitchen for most of its existence. The kitchen structure is one and one-half stories in height and measures 14 feet (4.3 m) by 16 feet (4.9 m). Constructed of hand-hewn logs, its exterior is sheathed in white-painted, beaded weatherboard siding, and its gable roof is topped by red cedar (Juniperus virginiana) roof shingles. The kitchen structure is accessible by an entryway on its southern façade, connected to the adjacent residential structure of the house by a covered porch. A large stone chimney dominates the kitchen structure's northern side, directly opposite the entryway on its southern side. One six-over-three-light wooden sash window is set in the center of the building's long sides on the ground floor, and two four-light wooden sash windows are in the southern gable opposite the fireplace to provide light to the upper story. (Note: A sash is a frame consisting of panes of glass. "Six-over-three" describes a window with two sashes; the top sash contains six glass panes, and the bottom sash contains three glass panes.) An enclosed staircase provides access to the upper story and is opposite the fireplace side of the building. The interior walls of the kitchen structure are painted white.

=== Residential structure ===
The residential structure or "the dwelling" of the house is immediately in front of the rear kitchen structure. The residential structure is one and one-half stories in height and measures 24 feet (7.3 m) by 20 feet (6.1 m). It is built of frame construction containing brick nogging (brick infill), and its exterior is sheathed in white-painted, beaded weatherboard siding. A gable roof tops the structure. Its exterior is symmetrically arranged, except for the prominent double brick chimneys on its western side, connected by a chimney pent (Note: According to acoustics specialist Cyril M. Harris in his book American Architecture: An Illustrated Encyclopedia, a chimney pent is a small area between two exterior chimneys on an end wall of a house at the ground floor level, and is topped by a small, narrow sloping roof.) on the ground floor. Central entryways are positioned on both the rear (northern) and front (southern) façades, with six-over-six-light wooden sash windows positioned on either side of each respective doorway. The upper level is illuminated by wooden sash windows in both its east and west gables. The two windows on the western gable with the double chimneys are small four-light wooden sash windows, and the two windows on the eastern gable are six-over-six-light wooden sash windows.

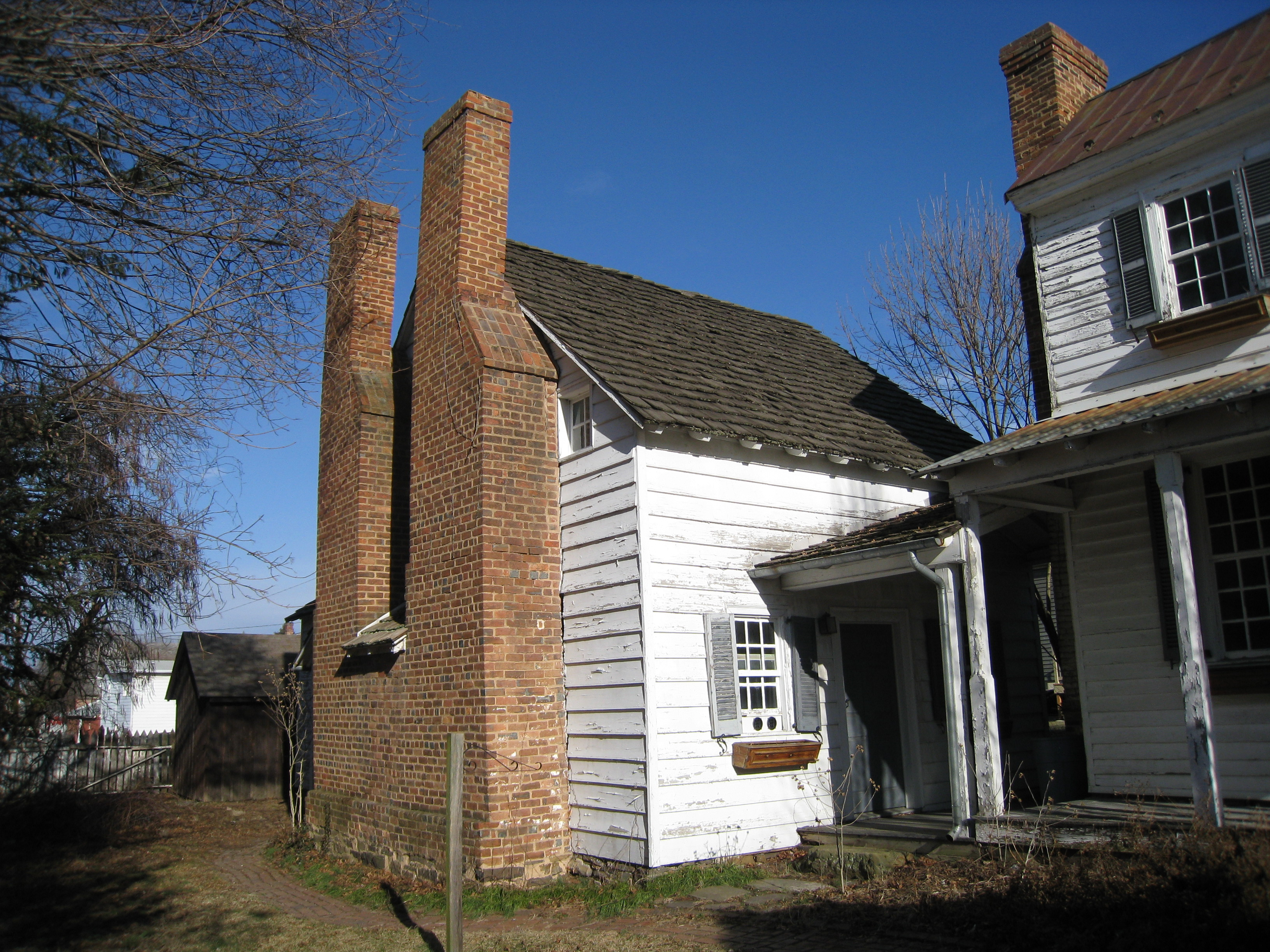
The west and south elevations of the residential structure

The residential structure consists of four rooms: two each traversing the ground level and upper level lengthwise. The front room on both the ground and upper levels is long and narrow. The double chimneys on the structure's western side allow for fireplaces in all four rooms. The western fireplace walls in all four rooms are enveloped by raised wooden paneling. The raised wooden paneling of the western walls is modest in design and includes a chimney pent closet flanking the left side of the segmental-arched fireplace in all four rooms. The fireplace opening is framed by a bolection molding; however, the fireplace lacks a mantel shelf. A cavetto cornice molding spans the length of the raised wooden paneling. (Note: According to architect Francis D. K. Ching, a cavetto is a concave molding with a profile that is approximate to a quarter circle.) Except for the fireplace wall, the interior walls of the ground-floor rooms are made of painted plaster, and the second-floor rooms' walls are made of painted flush boards. The structure's upper level is accessed by an enclosed staircase along the eastern wall of the larger rear rooms opposite the paneled fireplace walls.

According to Pitts and Harding, the architectural style and construction pattern of the residential structure were similar to buildings in Tidewater Maryland, built in the period before 1730. They stated that regardless of the structure's origin, it would have been "an expensive and pretentious structure" for the Romney area during that period. The half-timber construction, the brick nogging, the double brick chimneys with a connecting chimney pent, and the medieval floor plan are architectural features not usually associated with present-day West Virginia. The residential structure may have been built for either Lord Fairfax or his land agent. However, it is not known whether the kitchen structure was an existing pioneer home or a contemporary kitchen.

=== Clerk's office (1780s) ===
The largest and most imposing structure contributing to the Wilson-Wodrow-Mytinger House complex is the two and one-half-story "clerk's office". This building is the oldest extant public office building in the state of West Virginia. Built of wooden frame construction, it measures 14 feet (4.3 m) by 26 feet (7.9 m), with its southern gable facing perpendicular toward Gravel Lane and its main entryway positioned on the structure's western (front) elevation. Both the rear (eastern) and front (western) façades are three bays wide, with nine-over-nine-light wooden sash windows in the ground-floor bays, and six-over-six-light wooden sash windows in the second-floor bays. The symmetry of the front façade's windows is interrupted by the main entryway in the most southern of the three bays, which is spaced slightly further to the right of the above bay. The structure's main façade is adjoined with a one-story shed-roofed porch supported by chamfered wooden columns. On the structure's eastern façade, the six bays are symmetrically placed with three six-over-six-light wooden sash windows in the second story and three nine-over-nine-light wooden sash windows in the ground floor.

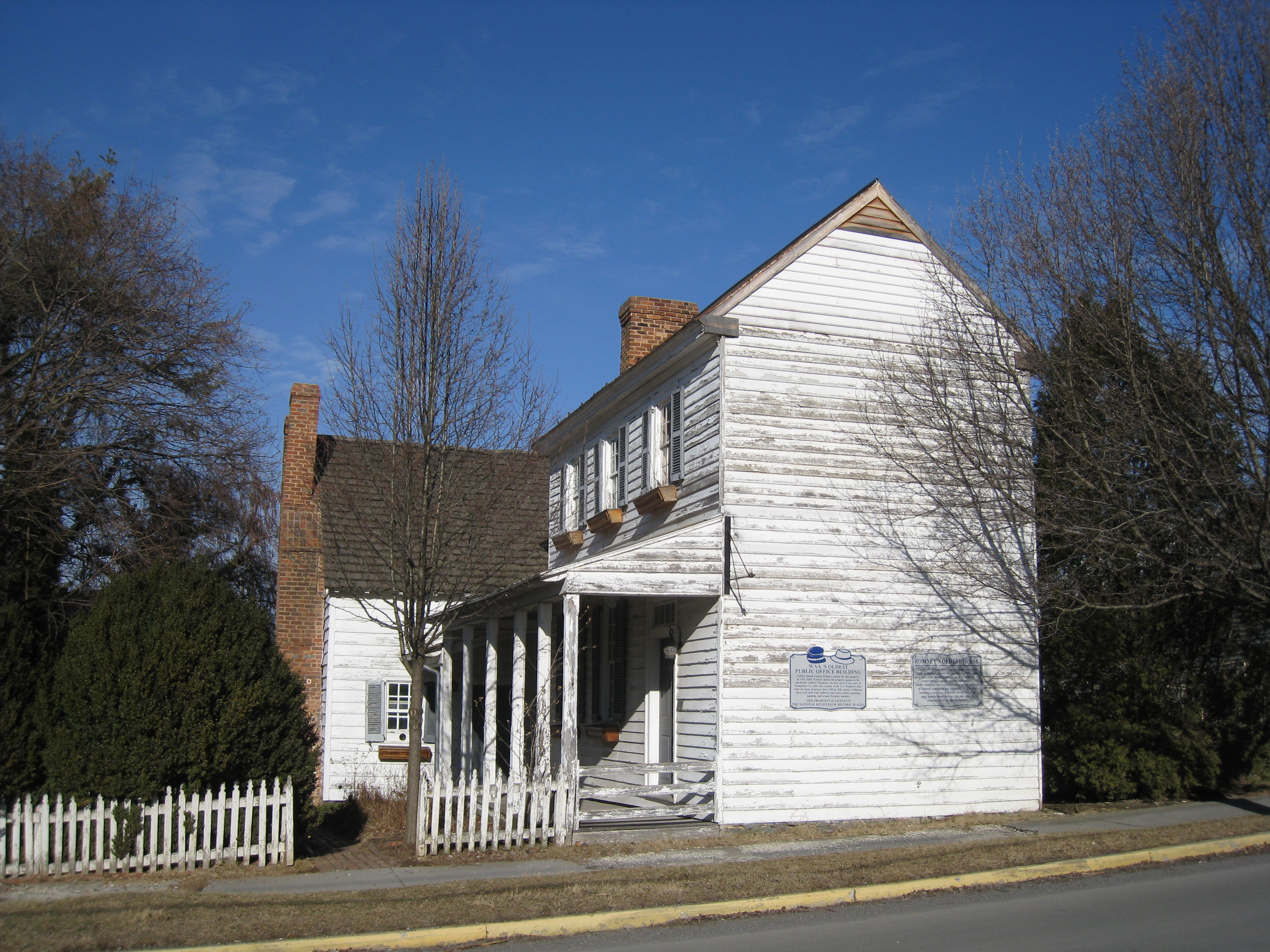
The clerk's office (foreground) and the residential structure (background) viewed from West Gravel Lane

Each of the structure's floors is divided between a large room and a narrow stair hall (in a side-hall plan), which connects the two stories by an open dog-leg stairway. The large room on each floor has a paneled fireplace wall on its northern end. On the first floor of the clerk's office, the segmental-arched fireplace opening is bordered by a crossette architrave. Pitts and Harding describe the wooden paneling on the fireplace wall as being "exceptional". The fireplace mantel's bracket exhibits moldings identical to the cornice, including a "wall of Troy" motif. (Note: According to architectural historian K. Edward Lay, a "wall of Troy" molding features "an undulating line in a rectangular fashion to resemble the fortified walls of Troy".) Fluted pilasters separate the fireplace wall into three sections. They consist of the segmental-arched fireplace with mantelpiece and the end segments of wooden paneling on either side of the fireplace. On the second floor, the wooden paneling is more simple in design, and the fireplace wall is divided into three segments with wooden paneling. The fireplace wall is adorned by a mantelpiece with a "wall of Troy" motif and a cornice containing dentils. The other interior walls within the clerk's office structure are painted plaster.

=== Old log house ===
The Wilson-Wodrow-Mytinger House property formerly contained an old log house where George Washington purportedly stayed in 1770 during his final visit to Romney. The house stood at the northeastern corner of Lot Number 48 until it was demolished in 1932.

== See also ==
- List of historic sites in Hampshire County, West Virginia
- National Register of Historic Places listings in Hampshire County, West Virginia

== Bibliography ==
- Brannon, Selden W., ed. (1976). Historic Hampshire: A Symposium of Hampshire County and Its People, Past and Present. Parsons, West Virginia: McClain Printing Company. ISBN 978-0-87012-236-1. OCLC 3121468.
- Chambers, S. Allen (2004). Buildings of West Virginia. Oxford, New York City: Oxford University Press. ISBN 978-0-19-516548-7. OCLC 53315276.
- Ching, Francis D. K. (2012). A Visual Dictionary of Architecture. Hoboken, New Jersey: John Wiley & Sons. ISBN 978-0-470-64885-8. OCLC 780495852 – via Google Books.
- Coleman, Roy V. (1951). Liberty and Property. New York City: Scribner. OCLC 1020487. Archived from the original on October 22, 2020 – via Google Books.
- Dunn, Walter Scott (2007). Choosing Sides on the Frontier in the American Revolution. Santa Barbara, California: Greenwood Publishing Group. ISBN 978-1-56720-667-8. OCLC 437198272. Archived from the original on October 27, 2020 – via Google Books.
- Federal Writers' Project (1937). Historic Romney 1762–1937. Romney, West Virginia: Federal Writers' Project, The Town Council of Romney, West Virginia. OCLC 2006735.
- Hampshire County Convention and Visitors Bureau (2019). Walking Tour of Historic Romney (PDF). Romney, West Virginia: Hampshire County Convention and Visitors Bureau. Archived (PDF) from the original on March 12, 2021.
- Harris, Cyril M. (1998). American Architecture: An Illustrated Encyclopedia. New York: W. W. Norton & Company. ISBN 0-393-73029-8. OCLC 660052198. Archived from the original on February 26, 2017 – via Google Books.
- Historic England (February 2017). Traditional Windows: Their Care, Repair and Upgrading. Swindon: Historic England. ISBN 978-1-84802-462-5. OCLC 1014451933. Archived from the original on December 31, 2017.
- Lay, K. Edward (2000). The Architecture of Jefferson Country: Charlottesville and Albemarle County, Virginia. Charlottesville, Virginia: University of Virginia Press. ISBN 978-0-8139-1885-3. OCLC 800488941. Archived from the original on October 27, 2020 – via Google Books.
- Maxwell, Hu; Swisher, Howard Llewellyn (1897). History of Hampshire County, West Virginia from Its Earliest Settlement to the Present. Morgantown, West Virginia: A. Brown Boughner, Printer. OCLC 680931891. OL 23304577M. Archived from the original on October 20, 2020 – via Internet Archive.
- Munske, Roberta R.; Kerns, Wilmer L., eds. (2004). Hampshire County, West Virginia, 1754–2004. Romney, West Virginia: The Hampshire County 250th Anniversary Committee. ISBN 978-0-9715738-2-6. OCLC 55983178.
- Pitts, Phillip R.; Harding, James E. (October 27, 1976). National Register of Historic Places Registration Form: Wilson-Wodrow-Mytinger House (PDF). United States Department of the Interior, National Park Service. Archived (PDF) from the original on October 16, 2015.
- Rice, Otis K. (2015). The Allegheny Frontier: West Virginia Beginnings, 1730–1830. Lexington, Kentucky: University Press of Kentucky. ISBN 978-0-8131-6438-0. OCLC 900345296. Archived from the original on May 27, 2016 – via Google Books.
- Rose, Cornelia Bruère (1976). Arlington County, Virginia: A History. Arlington County, Virginia: Arlington Historical Society. OCLC 2401541. Archived from the original on April 2, 2016 – via Google Books.
- Ross, Peter (1896). The Scot in America. New York City: Raeburn Book Company. OCLC 12362137. Archived from the original on January 1, 2014 – via Google Books.
- Whyte, Donald (2009). A Dictionary of Scottish Emigrants to the U. S. A., Volume 1. Baltimore: Genealogical Publishing Company. ISBN 978-0-8063-4817-9. OCLC 44113431. Archived from the original on January 1, 2014 – via Google Books.
- William and Mary Quarterly (April 1898). "The Northern Neck of Virginia". William and Mary Quarterly. 6 (4). Williamsburg, Virginia: College of William & Mary: 222–6. doi:10.2307/1915885. ISSN 0043-5597. JSTOR 1915885. OCLC 1607858.
- Woodworth, Robert Bell (1947). A History of the Presbytery of Winchester (Synod of Virginia): Its Rise and Growth, Ecclesiastical Relations, Institutions and Agencies, Churches and Ministers, 1719–1945. Staunton, Virginia: McClure Printing Company. OCLC 1873001. Archived from the original on June 10, 2016.
