= Willisville, Virginia =

Unincorporated community in Virginia, United States

- Unincorporated community
- Location within Northern Virginia Location within Virginia Location within the United States
- Coordinates: 39°0′26″N 77°50′3″W
- Country: United States
- State: Virginia
- County: Loudoun
- Time zone: UTC−5 (Eastern (EST))
  - Summer (DST): UTC−4 (EDT)

Willisville is an unincorporated community in southwestern Loudoun County, Virginia, United States, approximately sixteen miles from the county seat, Leesburg. Willisville is located at the crossroads of Willisville, Millville, and Welbourne Roads. It is named after freed slave Heuson Willis, who bought a cabin and three acres of land shortly after the Civil War. The tight-knit predominantly African American community of about a dozen houses and church became one of the last communities in wealthy Loudoun County without running water.

The Virginia Piedmont Heritage Area Association campaigned to have Willisville designated an historic site. Historic Preservationist Jane Covington finalized the nomination application for the historic village to be listed in the National Register of Historic Places, and has submitted it to the Virginia Department of Historic Resources (VDHR) for review at their September 2019 quarterly meeting. Willisville was added to the National Register in 2019.
