= List of newspapers in West Virginia =

This is a list of newspapers in West Virginia, sorted by location.

== Daily and nondaily newspapers ==
Title	Locale	Year est.	Frequency	Publisher/parent company	Notes
Barbour Democrat	Philippi	1893	Nondaily		
Bluefield Daily Telegraph	Bluefield	1893	Daily	CNHI	
Braxton Citizens' News	Sutton	1976	Nondaily		
Braxton Democrat	Sutton	1883	Nondaily		
Brooke County Review	Wellsburg	1911	Nondaily		
Calhoun Chronicle	Grantsville	1883	Nondaily		
Charleston Gazette-Mail	Charleston	1872	Tue - Sun	HD Media	Major newspaper
Clay Free Press	Clay	1905	Nondaily		
Coal Valley News	Madison	1925	Nondaily	HD Media	
Doddridge Independent	West Union		Nondaily		
Dominion Post	Morgantown	1863	Daily	Ogden Newspapers Inc.	Major newspaper
Exponent-Telegram	Clarksburg	1874	Daily	NCWV Media	
Fayette Tribune	Oak Hill	1883	M/Th		
Glenville Democrat	Glenville	1904	Nondaily		
Glenville Pathfinder	Glenville	1892	Nondaily		
Good News Paper	Shepherdstown	1979	Nondaily		
Grant County Press	Petersburg	1896	Nondaily		
Greenbrier Valley Ranger	Lewisburg		Nondaily		
Hampshire Review	Romney	1884	Weekly		
Herald Record	West Union	1885	Nondaily		
Herald-Dispatch	Huntington		Daily		Major newspaper
Intelligencer	Wheeling	1852	Daily	Ogden Newspapers Inc.	Major newspaper
Inter-Mountain	Elkins		Daily	Ogden Newspapers Inc.	
Jackson County Citizen	Ripley		Nondaily		
Jackson Herald	Ripley		Nondaily	NCWV Media	
Jackson Star News	Ravenswood		Nondaily		
Journal	Martinsburg		Daily	Ogden Newspapers Inc.	
Logan Banner	Logan		Daily	HD Media	
Mineral Daily News-Tribune	Keyser		Daily	NCWV Media	
Monroe Watchman	Union				
Moorefield Examiner	Moorefield	1874	Weekly		
Morgan Messenger	Berkeley Springs	1893	Weekly		
Moundsville Daily Echo	Moundsville	1891	Weekly	Moundsville Echo, LLC	
Mountain Messenger (Lewisburg)	Lewisburg		Weekly	Mountain Media News	
Mountain Statesman	Grafton	1870	Nondaily	NCWV Media	
Nicholas Chronicle	Summersville	1880	Nondaily		
The Observer	Shepherdstown		Monthly		
Parkersburg News and Sentinel	Parkersburg		Daily	Ogden Newspapers Inc.	Major newspaper
Parsons Advocate	Parsons	1886	Weekly		
Pendleton Times	Franklin	1913	Weekly	Pendleton Times LLC	
Pennsboro News	Pennsboro		Nondaily		
Pineville Independent Herald	Pineville	1912	Weekly		
Pleasants County Leader	St. Marys		Nondaily		
Pocahontas Times	Marlinton		Nondaily		
Point Pleasant Register	Point Pleasant	1862	Daily		
Princeton Times	Princeton		Nondaily	CNHI	
Putnam Standard	Culloden		Nondaily		
Record Delta	Buckhannon		Nondaily		
Register-Herald	Beckley	1985	Daily	CNHI	Major newspaper
Ritchie Gazette	Harrisville		Nondaily		
Sentinel	Salem		Nondaily		
Shepherdstown Chronicle	Shepherdstown			Ogden Newspapers Inc.	
The Shinnston News and Harrison County Journal	Shinnston	1898	Nondaily	Harrison County Publishing Co	
Spirit of Jefferson and Farmer's Advocate	Charles Town	1844	Nondaily		
St. Marys Oracle	St. Marys		Nondaily		
State Journal	Charleston	1984	Nondaily	NCWV Media	
Sunday News-Register	Wheeling		Daily		
Times West Virginian	Fairmont		Daily	CNHI	Major newspaper
Tyler Star News	Sistersville		Nondaily	Ogden Newspapers Inc.	
Wayne County News	Wayne		Daily		
Weirton Daily Times	Weirton		Daily	Ogden Newspapers Inc.	
Welch News	Welch		Nondaily		
West Virginia Daily News	Lewisburg	1967	Daily	Ecent Corporation	
Weston Democrat	Weston	1868	Weekly	NCWV Media	
Wetzel Chronicle	New Martinsville		Nondaily	Ogden Newspapers Inc.	
Wheeling News-Register	Wheeling		Daily	Ogden Newspapers Inc.	Major newspaper
Williamson Daily News	Williamson		Daily	HD Media	
Wirt County Journal	Elizabeth	1908	Daily		

== College newspapers ==
Marshall University, Huntington

- The Parthenon

West Virginia University, Morgantown

- The Athenaeum

Shepherd University, Shepherdstown

- The Picket

== Defunct newspapers ==
Title	Locale	Year est.	Year ceased	Frequency
Cabell Standard	Culloden		2015	Nondaily
Charleston Advocate	Charleston	Vol. 9 was published in 1910.		Weekly
Charleston Daily Mail				
Charleston Gazette				
Huntington Advertiser			1979	
Industrial News	Iaeger	1923	2017	
Richwood News Leader				
La Sentinella del West Virginia	(Thomas	1905	1913	
Virginia Argus and Hampshire Advertiser	Romney	1850	1861	Nondaily
West Virginia Hillbilly				

== See also ==
- West Virginia media
  - List of radio stations in West Virginia
  - List of television stations in West Virginia
  - Media of cities in West Virginia: Charleston, Huntington, Wheeling
- Journalism
  - Category:Journalists from West Virginia
  - West Virginia University Reed College of Media, in Morgantown
  - Marshall University Pitt School of Journalism and Mass Communications (est. 1926)
- West Virginia literature
U.S. newspapers

Comprehensive

- Lists of newspapers
- List of newspapers in the United States

Frequency

- List of free daily newspapers in the United States
- List of weekly newspapers in the United States

Circulation

- List of international newspapers originating in the United States
- List of national newspapers in the United States
- List of newspapers in the United States by circulation
- List of newspapers serving cities over 100,000 in the United States

Foreign language

- List of French-language newspapers published in the United States
- List of German-language newspapers published in the United States
- List of Spanish-language newspapers published in the United States

Specialty

- List of African-American newspapers in the United States
- List of alternative weekly newspapers in the United States
- List of business newspapers in the United States
- List of family-owned newspapers in the United States
- List of Jewish newspapers in the United States
- List of LGBTQ periodicals in the United States
- List of student newspapers in the United States
- List of supermarket tabloids in the United States
- List of underground press in the United States

Other

- List of defunct newspapers of the United States

== Bibliography ==
- S. N. D. North; United States Department of the Interior (1884). "Catalogue of Periodical Publications: West Virginia". History and Present Condition of the Newspaper and Periodical Press of the United States. Washington, D.C.: Government Printing Office. OCLC 1850475.
- "West Virginia". American Newspaper Directory. New York: George P. Rowell. 1900. pp. 1084+. hdl:2027/umn.31951002273861a – via HathiTrust.
- "West Virginia". American Newspaper Annual & Directory. Philadelphia: N. W. Ayer & Son. 1922. pp. 1043+. hdl:2027/umn.31951001295695n.
- Federal Writers' Project (1941), "Newspapers", West Virginia: A Guide to the Mountain State, American Guide Series, New York: Oxford University Press, pp. 112+, ISBN 9781603540476 – via Google Books
- Otis K. Rice (July 1953). "West Virginia Printers and their Work, 1790-1830". West Virginia History. West Virginia Historical Society. ISSN 0043-325X.
- Delf Norona (1958). West Virginia Imprints, 1790-1863: A Checklist of Books, Newspapers, Periodicals and Broadsides. Moundsville: West Virginia Library Association. OCLC 863601 – via Internet Archive.
- G. Thomas Tanselle (1971). "General Studies: West Virginia". Guide to the Study of United States Imprints. Harvard University Press. p. 886. ISBN 978-0-674-36761-6. (Includes information about newspapers)
- Harold M. Forbes (1981), "The Press and Printing" (PDF), West Virginia History: A Bibliography and Guide to Research, West Virginia University Press
- Harold M. Forbes (1989). West Virginia Newspapers, 1790-1990: A Union List. Morgantown: West Virginia University Library. OCLC 20336545.
- Betty L. Powell Hart (1991). "Spicy Editorials and Fearless Sayings: The Black Press in West Virginia". Appalachian Heritage. 19 (4): 51–55. doi:10.1353/aph.1991.0120. S2CID 201761388.
- Edgar Simpson (2011). "Pressing the Press". Journalism History. 36. (About newspaper industry in W. Virginia)
