= Roy Earl Parrish =

American lawyer and politician (1888–1918)

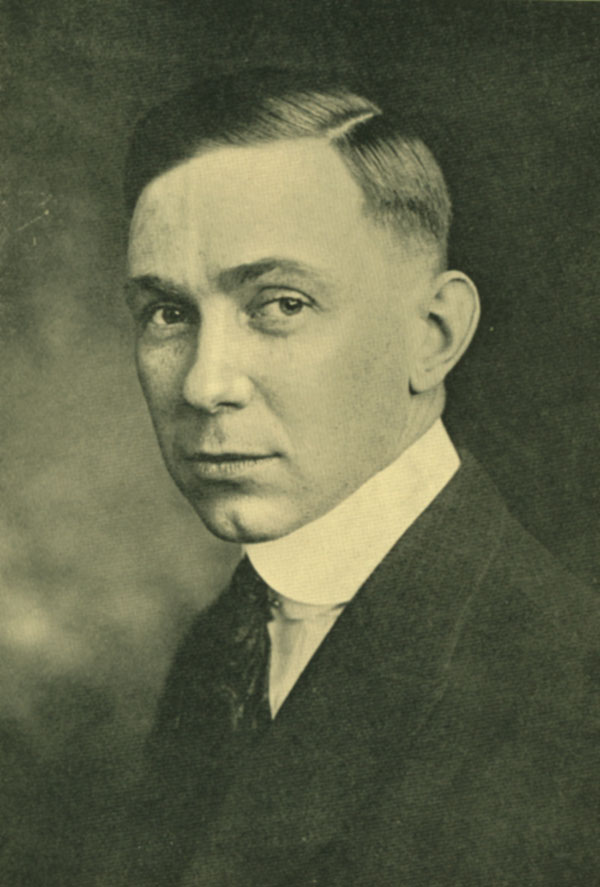
- Parrish c. 1916

Member of the West Virginia Senate for the 12th district
- In office January 1915 – July 22, 1918

Member of the West Virginia House of Delegates for Harrison County
- In office January 1913 – January 1915

Personal details
- Born: November 24, 1888 Wallace, West Virginia, U.S.
- Died: July 22, 1918 (aged 29) Noyant-et-Aconin, France
- Resting place: Oise-Aisne American Cemetery
- Party: Republican
- Education: West Virginia Wesleyan College; West Virginia University

Military service
- Allegiance: United States
- Branch/service: United States Army
- Years of service: 1917–1918
- Rank: Second Lieutenant
- Unit: 6th Field Artillery Regiment
- Battles/wars: World War I: Battle of Cantigny; Battle of Château-Thierry; Battle of Soissons †
- Awards: Silver Star

Roy Earl Parrish (November 24, 1888 – July 22, 1918) was an American lawyer and politician who served in the West Virginia Senate from 1915 until his death in 1918. He was a member of the Republican Party and represented Harrison, Doddridge, and Lewis counties. Parrish had been a member of the West Virginia House of Delegates from 1913 until 1915, representing Harrison County. Throughout his tenure, he was the youngest member of the legislature.

While in the legislature, Parrish took many progressive positions, and introduced bills establishing worker's compensation and campaign finance reform. He also became one of the principal opponents of Governor Henry D. Hatfield, a fellow Republican, due to Hatfield's desire to increase taxes on natural gas production. In 1916, Parrish was named chairman of the Harrison County Republican Party and vice president of the West Virginia Republican Party, giving him a prominent role in the 1916 presidential election in the state. Parrish was well-regarded in West Virginia; one newspaper said his "word is as good as legal tender".

Though he was still a sitting state senator, Parrish joined the United States Army in 1917 following America's entry into World War I. He was commissioned as a second lieutenant in the 6th Field Artillery Regiment and was sent to the front in May 1918. On July 22, 1918, Parrish was killed in action near the town of Noyant-et-Aconin in northern France.

== Early life and education ==
Roy Earl Parrish was born in Wallace, West Virginia, on November 24, 1888. His parents were prominent Clarksburg businessman Thomas Jefferson Parrish and his wife Mary Morgan, and he was the third of their seven children. Parrish was raised in Harrison County and attended local public schools. After graduating from West Virginia Wesleyan College with high honors in 1908, he began attending West Virginia University in Morgantown, where he studied law. He joined the fraternity Sigma Chi and graduated in 1910. The same year, Parrish was admitted to the Harrison County bar association and he was appointed a notary public in the county court. As a lawyer, he took part in bankruptcy, real estate, and divorce trials. He was a member of the local Methodist Episcopal Church.

== Political career ==
=== House of Delegates ===
In April 1912, Parrish declared his candidacy for the West Virginia House of Delegates, running as a member of the Republican Party to represent Harrison County, which elected two delegates. He won the Republican primary election, receiving 1,734 votes and placing second behind Charles A. Sutton. Parrish, who campaigned alongside congressional candidate Howard Sutherland, ran on a platform of being "independent of all factionalism"; the Clarksburg Daily Telegram considered him "a loyal Republican and a firm believer in the party's principles". Both Parrish and Sutton were elected in the November 1912 election, receiving 4,920 and 4,979 votes, respectively, a margin of around 300 votes over their Democratic Party opponents. Parrish was the youngest member of the West Virginia Legislature.

Among the legislation introduced by Parrish in the 1913 legislative session was House Resolution 17, which proposed the re-apportionment of the West Virginia Senate from fifteen two-member constituencies to one senator per county, which would have expanded the senate from 30 members to 55. Parrish was a progressive; he also introduced a primary election bill that created popular primary elections for all political offices ranging from U.S. senator to county committeemen, and a preferential preference primary for President and Vice President of the United States, and helped draft a successful workers' compensation law. Additionally, he backed legislation that established a public services commission, granted women's suffrage, and improved West Virginia's road network.

During the same session, Parrish nominated Judge Nathan Goff Jr. for the United States Senate and was one of his primary supporters in the legislature. Later in 1913, Parrish was the campaign chairman for state senator Julian G. Hearne's campaign for the U.S. House of Representatives in that year's special election for the 1st congressional district. Though the Democratic nominee defeated Hearne, the Republican Party considered the campaign a success due to Hearne outperforming the Progressive Party, which had placed second in the district in the 1912 United States presidential election.

=== State Senate ===
In 1914, Parrish announced his candidacy for the West Virginia Senate, running in the 12th senatorial district, which consisted of Harrison, Lewis, and Doddridge counties. With an endorsement from the Lewis County Republican Party, he won the Republican nomination at the party convention. He was also selected as one of Harrison County's delegates to the West Virginia Republican Party convention. Parrish's state senate campaign "solicit[ed] the support of all the voters, whether they be Republican, Progressive, Democrat, or Socialist", and was supported by former U.S. representative Joseph H. Gaines. Parrish was elected to the heavily Republican district, winning all three counties and receiving a majority of 1,100 votes – the largest majority of any candidate for the state senate since 1904. At the time of his election, Parrish was one of the youngest people to have been elected to the state senate. The Republican Party held majorities in both chambers of the state legislature after this election.

In the 1915 legislative session, Parrish served on the finance, counties and municipal corporations, public buildings and humane institutions, immigration and agriculture, public printing, public library, and enrolled bills committees. He was chairman of the redistricting committee; in this role, he led the congressional redistricting process and successfully pushed a bill that re-apportioned the House of Delegates, expanding Harrison County's representation from two delegates to four. He also introduced the successful Corrupt Practices Act, which required mandatory campaign finance reporting. Parrish was well-regarded: the Clarksburg Daily Telegram wrote his "word is as good as legal tender".

During the session, Senator R. A. Blessing introduced a bill that proposed moving West Virginia University from Morgantown to Charleston. In response, Parrish introduced a joke bill that proposed moving the state capital from Charleston to Clarksburg, and gave a humorous speech in which he said Charleston was "too closely in touch with the customs of the Old Dominion [Virginia]". Charles E. Baird introduced a parallel resolution in the House of Delegates saying Charleston had a poor climate and was riddled with smallpox. Parrish's effort to mock the university bill was successful; both bills were defeated.

Later in the 1915 session, a split within the state Republican Party occurred between legislators who were aligned with the administration of Governor Henry D. Hatfield and those who opposed it due to the governor's desire to increase taxes to boost revenue. Senator Wells Goodykoontz, a former-Democrat-turned-Republican and the administration's spokesman, introduced a bill to institute a production tax on natural gas. Parrish, whose region of the state was rich in natural gas, led arguments against the bill, saying it unfairly targeted the gas industry. As a compromise, Parrish introduced an amendment to the bill that would also levy production taxes on coal and oil but Goodykoontz rejected this.

Tensions erupted on March 12, 1915: according to the Bluefield Daily Telegraph, that day's exchanges were "the most turbulent scenes that ever marked a day in the West Virginia legislature". Goodykoontz gave an impassioned speech in which he accused the anti-administration faction of being "driven by the lash of corporate wealth in order to protect those who object to paying their equitable share of taxes". In response, Parrish accused Goodykoontz of being "a renegade Democrat controlled by the administration machine", while George E. White – another Republican anti-administration senator — stated Goodykoontz's membership of the Republican Party was comparable to "a flea on a dog". After this, the senate was overwhelmed with senators "demanding recognition" to speak, resulting in the President of the Senate having to clear the floor.

The April 1915 special session also resulted in no revenue bill being passed; Parrish and Goodykoontz openly quarreled on the floor of the senate, forcing another special session to be held the following month. During the May session, all anti-administration senators were purposefully excluded from the special committee that was tasked with reviewing all introduced legislation, allowing Governor Hatfield to force through his preferred revenue package, an omnibus bill that was derisively referred to as a "jitney bus" and contained tax increases across the board. By the end of the month, Parrish and White had succumbed to the administration's pressure and voted in favor of the bill.

Despite being the youngest member of the senate, Parrish had become a prominent leader in state Republican politics by 1916. That year, he became the chairman of the Harrison County Republican Party and was the first vice president of the West Virginia Republican Party; in these roles, he managed the 1916 presidential election campaign in Harrison County. Parrish initially supported former U.S. senator Theodore E. Burton in the Republican presidential primary, but by May 1916, he was "strongly in favor" of Charles Evans Hughes, an associate justice of the Supreme Court of the United States and the eventual winner of the Republican nomination. (Note: Parrish's second and third choices were former vice president Charles W. Fairbanks and former Missouri governor Herbert S. Hadley.) He also supported the unsuccessful candidacy of former governor Albert B. White for the Republican nomination for the U.S. Senate. In Harrison County, Parrish organized several speeches from national Republican politicians, including former U.S. attorney general George W. Wickersham, U.S. senator Albert B. Cummins, (Note: Cummins cancelled due to illness.) and U.S. representatives Henry Wilson Temple and Nicholas Longworth. In October 1916, Parrish coordinated a speech by Hughes in Clarksburg, which was attended by thousands of people from across the state. He was also named a member of the Men's Advisory Board of the West Virginia Equal Suffrage Association. Though Hughes lost the presidential election, he narrowly won in both West Virginia and Harrison County.

With Republicans retaining control of the state senate, Parrish declared his candidacy for president of the senate in December 1916. His campaign received support from prominent Republicans in the state, primarily due to his "experience in legislative matters" and his role in securing victories for the Republican Party in the 1916 election. He was also endorsed by the Clarksburg Daily Telegram, the Tyler County News, and Republican National Committeeman Virgil L. Highland. Concerns about his age were raised, however: opponents claimed Parrish was "too young ... to occupy the place of succession to the governorship". (Note: The president of the senate is first in the gubernatorial line of succession.) Parrish was defeated by Senator Goodykoontz on the first ballot, losing eight votes to eleven among Republican senators. During the 1917 session, Parrish introduced legislation proposing the expansion of Clarksburg's city limits, raising the city's population to 30,000. He was a member of the judiciary, education, railroads, militia, and public library committees, and chaired the insurance committee.

== Military career and death ==
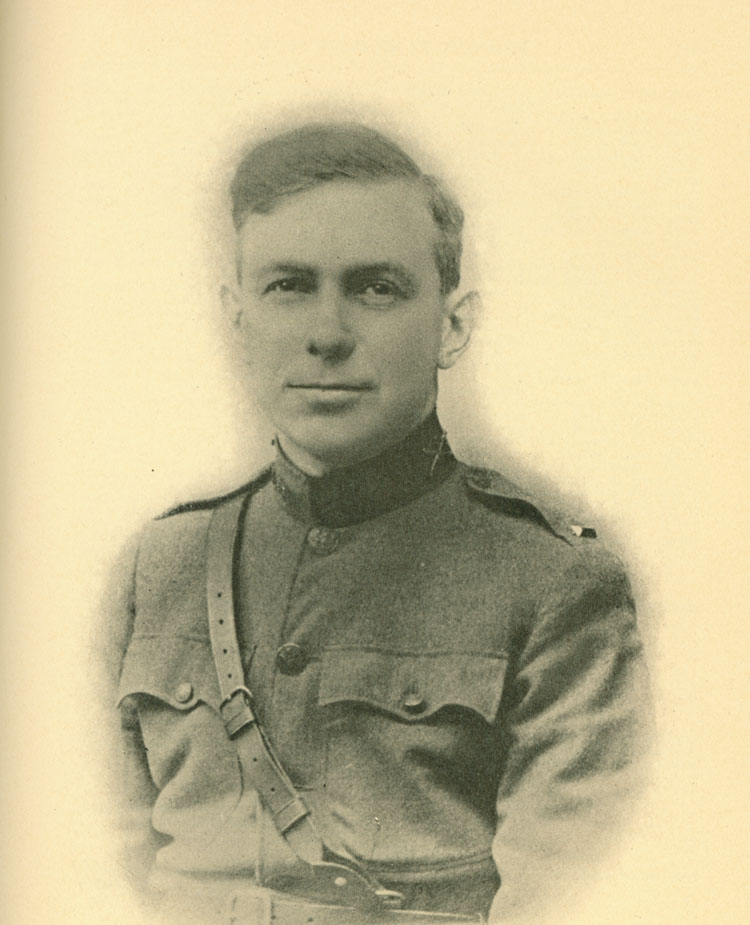
Parrish in military uniform c. 1917

In May 1917, following America's entry into World War I, Governor John J. Cornwell called a special session of the legislature. Instead of attending the session, Parrish joined the United States Army, attending Officer Candidate School at Fort Benjamin Harrison in Indiana. On August 15, 1917, he was commissioned as a second lieutenant in the Field Artillery Branch and was sent to Camp Sheridan in Alabama the following month. While at Camp Sheridan, Parrish worked as a judge advocate until December 15, when he was given orders to report to New York City for deployment to Europe. Parrish set sail from New York on January 14, arriving in Liverpool, England, on February 5. From there, he traveled to France, where he attended an artillery school for three months.

After his training, Parrish was sent to the front with the 6th Field Artillery Regiment, 1st Infantry Division, where he served as a liaison officer. Parrish was well-regarded in the position; a superior wrote: "his reports have been clear, intelligent, and full of valuable information. They are models of Liaison work". In May 1918, Parrish went over the top during the Battle of Cantigny and on July 18, he took part in the Battle of Château-Thierry. Four days later, near the town of Noyant-et-Aconin, Parrish was killed when a German high explosive shell directly struck him, blowing him "to pieces". He was initially buried in a shell hole north of Missy-aux-Bois, near Berzy-le-Sec, but was later re-interred in the Oise-Aisne American Cemetery and a cenotaph was constructed for him in the West Virginia National Cemetery.

Major John C. Bond, the adjutant general of West Virginia, praised Parrish's military service and described him as a "second [Theodore] Roosevelt" and "one of the most fearless men I have ever known". Henry Pinckney McCain, the adjutant general of the U.S. Army, also commended Parrish's "heroic sacrifice and patriotism". On January 21, 1919, the West Virginia Senate set aside a full legislative day to hold a memorial session for Parrish; eight current and former senators from both parties delivered eulogies. In his eulogy, Fred L. Fox – the Senate Democratic leader – stated Parrish likely "would have gone to higher places in the state and nation had he lived".

A bronze memorial plaque honoring Parrish was later installed in the West Virginia State Capitol and his name is included on a plaque in the West Virginia Supreme Court building memorializing West Virginia lawyers who died fighting in World War I. On June 3, 1919, Parrish was posthumously awarded the Silver Star for "gallantry in action". The American Legion post in Clarksburg is named after him.
