= 1960 Democratic Party presidential primaries =

Selection of the Democratic Party nominee

- March 8 to June 7, 1960

1,521 delegates to the Democratic National Convention 761 (majority) votes needed to win

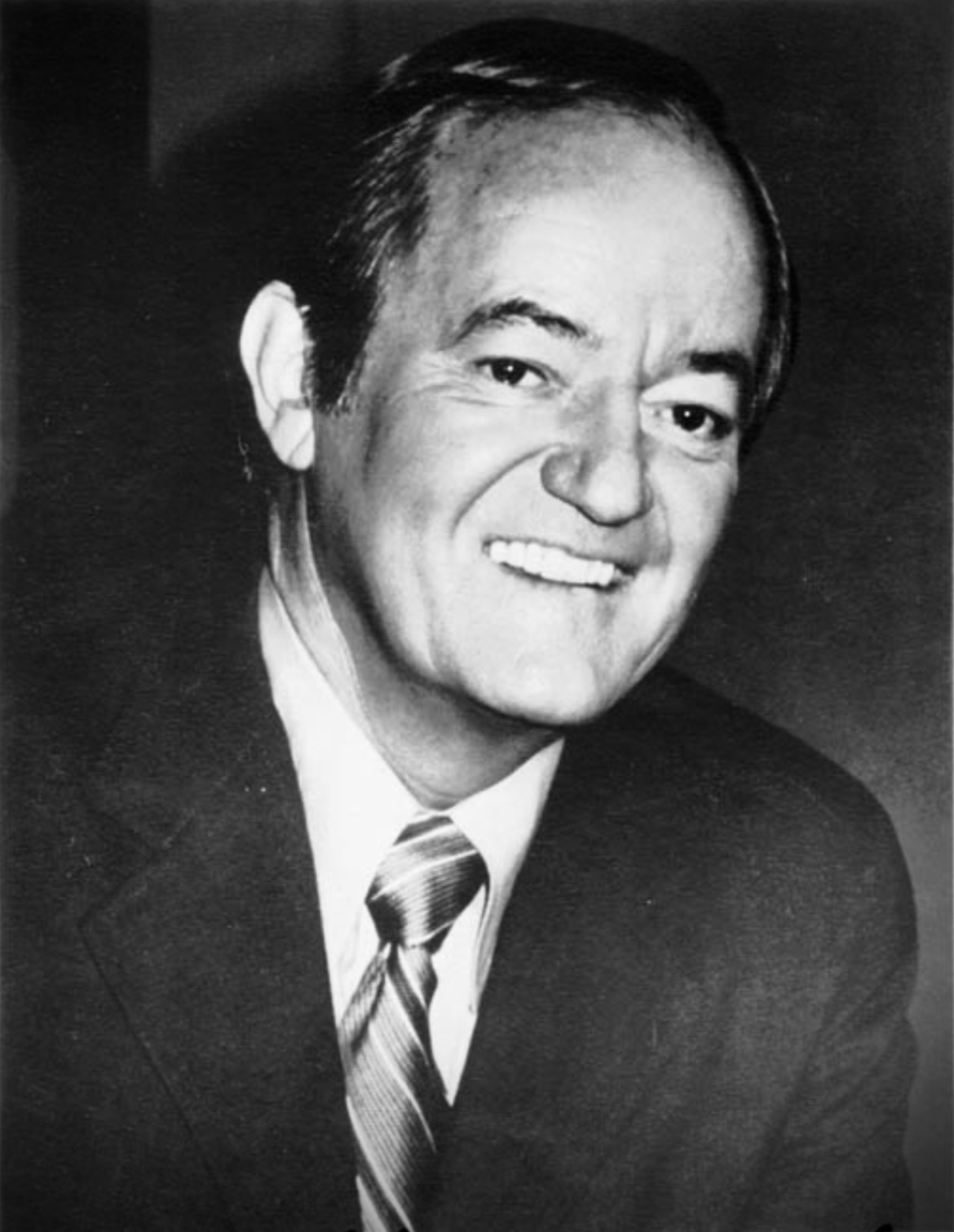
Candidate	John F. Kennedy	Hubert Humphrey
Home state	Massachusetts	Minnesota
Contests won	10	2
Popular vote	1,847,259	590,410
Percentage	31.4%	10.1%
- Kennedy Johnson Humphrey Various (Note: Favorite sons received the support of Missouri (Stuart Symington), Florida (George Smathers), New Jersey (Robert Meyner), Mississippi (Ross Barnett), and Hawaii. (Adlai E. Stevenson II))
Previous Democratic nominee
Adlai Stevenson
Democratic nominee
John F. Kennedy

From March 8 to June 7, 1960, voters and members of the Democratic Party elected delegates to the 1960 Democratic National Convention through a series of caucuses, conventions, and primaries, partly for the purpose of nominating a candidate for President of the United States in the 1960 election. The presidential primaries were inconclusive, as several of the leading contenders did not enter them, but U.S. Senator John F. Kennedy of Massachusetts emerged as the strongest candidate and won the nomination over Lyndon B. Johnson at the convention, held from July 11 to 15 at the Los Angeles Memorial Sports Arena.

Recalling the experience of 1928 Democratic nominee Al Smith (who was Catholic), many wondered if anti-Catholic prejudice would affect Kennedy's chances of winning the nomination and the election in November. To prove his vote-getting ability, Kennedy challenged U.S. senator Hubert Humphrey of Minnesota, a liberal, in the Wisconsin primary. Although Kennedy defeated Humphrey in Wisconsin, his reliance on heavily Catholic areas left many party bosses unconvinced. Kennedy thus faced Humphrey in the heavily Protestant state of West Virginia. Humphrey's campaign was low on money and could not compete with the well-organized, well-financed Kennedy team. Kennedy's siblings combed the state looking for votes, leading Humphrey to complain that he "felt like an independent merchant running against a chain store." On primary day, Kennedy crushed Humphrey with over 60% of the vote, and Humphrey withdrew from the race.

Although Kennedy won the popular contests by comfortable margin, his main opponent, Senate Majority Leader Lyndon B. Johnson, did not participate (except as a write-in candidate). Johnson had a very strong base in the party establishment and gained the support of many delegates chosen through caucus and convention selection processes. In the months leading up to the Democratic Convention, Kennedy traveled around the nation persuading delegates from various states to support him. However, as the Convention opened, Kennedy was still a few dozen votes short of victory.

Several major candidates served as Democratic Party nominees, with John F. Kennedy serving as the nominee for 1960, Johnson in 1964, and Humphrey in 1968.

== Background ==
=== 1952 and 1956 elections ===
After controlling the White House for five consecutive terms from 1933 through 1953, the Democratic Party had been defeated in two consecutive elections. Both times, popular World War II general Dwight D. Eisenhower defeated Adlai Stevenson II.

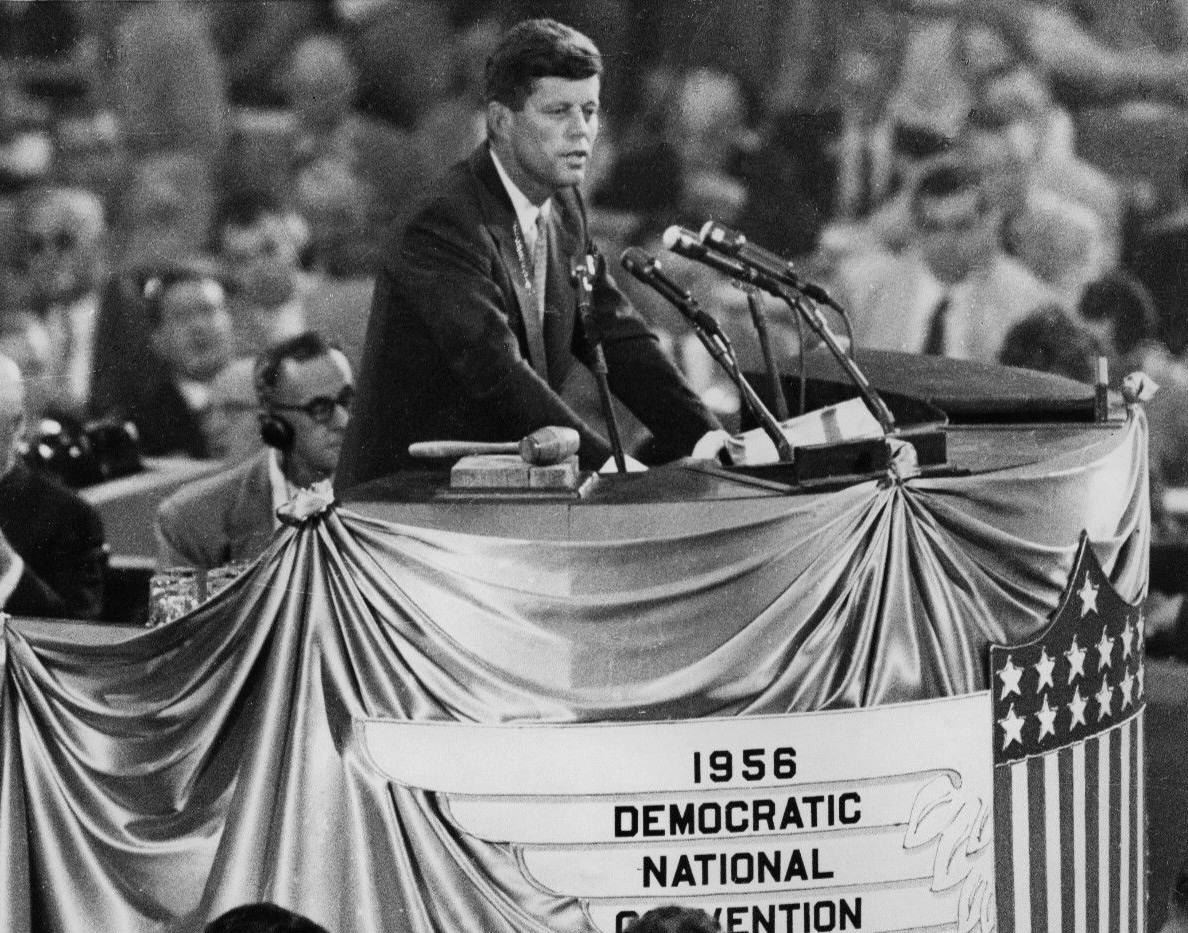
John F. Kennedy raised his national profile at the 1956 Democratic National Convention by giving the nominating speech for Adlai Stevenson II and finishing second in the contest for the vice-presidential nomination.

At the 1956 Democratic National Convention, Stevenson surprisingly left the choice of his vice-presidential running mate to the delegates. Following his nomination in Chicago, Stevenson made a brief appearance before the convention. He told the delegates he had decided "to depart from the precedents of the past" and that "the selection of the Vice Presidential nominee should be made through the free processes of this convention." With one day's notice, the candidates scrambled to assemble campaigns for delegate support. The leaders were Estes Kefauver, who had run two populist campaigns for the presidency but lost the nomination each time to Stevenson, and John F. Kennedy, a relatively unknown 39-year-old United States Senator from Massachusetts but a scion of the powerful Kennedy family. Kennedy surprised observers by surging into the lead on the second ballot and falling only 39 votes short of the nomination, but on the third ballot, several favorite son candidates threw their delegations' support to Kefauver, and he prevailed. Kennedy gave a gracious concession speech, raising his national profile within the party.

=== 1958 midterm elections ===
In the 1958 elections, the Republican Party suffered heavy losses due to a nationwide economic recession, the launch of Sputnik by the Soviet Union, and the galvanized opposition of organized labor following the passage of strengthened labor restrictions. Kennedy was re-elected in a historic landslide; the gain of ten Senate seats also buttressed the political power of Senate Majority Leader Lyndon B. Johnson, who had won the regional support of some Southern delegations in 1956.

"Democrats won seats in the Senate in California, Connecticut, Indiana, Maine, Michigan, Minnesota, Nevada, New Jersey, Ohio, Utah, West Virginia and Wyoming." Democrats conceded no seats they had obtained in previous years.

== Candidates ==
The following political leaders were candidates for the 1960 Democratic presidential nomination:

=== Nominee ===
Candidate	Most recent office	Home state	Campaign Withdrawal date	Popular vote	Contests won	Running mate
John F. Kennedy	U.S. Senator from Massachusetts (1953–1960)	Massachusetts	(Campaign); Secured nomination: July 15, 1960	1,847,259 (31.4%)	10	Lyndon B. Johnson

=== Other major candidates ===
These candidates participated in multiple state primaries or were included in multiple major national polls.

Candidate	Most recent office	Home state	Campaign Withdrawal date
Lyndon B. Johnson	United States Senator from Texas (1949–1961)	Texas	Announced: July 1960 (Campaign)
Hubert Humphrey	United States Senator from Minnesota (1949–1964, 1971–1978)	Minnesota	Announced: December 30, 1959; Withdrew: May 10, 1960 (Campaign)
Adlai Stevenson II	Governor of Illinois (1949–1953)	Illinois	(Campaign)
Stuart Symington	U.S. Senator from Missouri (1953–1976)	Missouri	(Campaign)
Robert B. Meyner	Governor of New Jersey (1954–1962)	New Jersey	(Campaign)
Wayne Morse	United States Senator from Oregon (1945–1969)	Oregon	(Campaign)

=== Favorite sons ===
The following candidates ran only in their home state's primary or caucus for the purpose of controlling its delegate slate at the convention and did not appear to be considered national candidates by the media.

- Governor Ross Barnett of Mississippi
- Governor Pat Brown of California (pledged support to Kennedy)
- Governor Michael DiSalle of Ohio (pledged support to Kennedy)
- Governor Herschel Loveless of Iowa
- George H. McLain of California
- Albert S. Porter of Ohio
- Senator George Smathers of Florida

=== Declined to run ===
The following persons were listed in two or more major national polls or were the subject of media speculation surrounding their potential candidacy, but declined to actively seek the nomination.

- Senator Joseph Clark of Pennsylvania
- Former Governor Frank G. Clement of Tennessee
- Governor Orval Faubus of Arkansas
- Senator Albert Gore of Tennessee
- Former Governor W. Averell Harriman of New York
- Senator Estes Kefauver of Tennessee
- Senator Edmund Muskie of Maine
- Governor G. Mennen Williams of Michigan

== Polling ==
=== National polling ===
Poll source	Publication	Pat Brown	Hubert Humphrey	Estes Kefauver	John F. Kennedy	Lyndon Johnson	Adlai Stevenson	Stuart Symington	Other	Undecided
Gallup	Aug. 11, 1957	–	5%	29%	23%	8%	–	5%	14% (Note: Frank Clement with 6%, G. Mennen Williams with 4%, Edmund Muskie with 2%, Robert Meyner and Robert Kerr combined for 2%)	16%
Gallup	Nov. 16, 1957	–	3%	26%	19%	11%	–	5%	15% (Note: Frank Clement with 6%, Robert Meyner with 3%, and 6% combined for Happy Chandler, G. Mennen Williams, and Robert Kerr)	21%
Gallup	June 11, 1958	–	3%	16%	19%	12%	23%	4%	8% (Note: Frank Clement with 4%, Robert Meyner and G. Mennen Williams combined for 4%)	15%
Gallup	Nov. 30, 1958	–	1%	11%	23%	6%	29%	5%	11% (Note: G. Mennen Williams with 5%, Orval Faubus with 4%, and Robert Meyner with <2%)	14%
Gallup	Jan. 25, 1959	–	4%	10%	25%	7%	29%	4%	12% (Note: G. Mennen Williams with 5%, Orval Faubus with 5%, and Robert Meyner with 2%)	9%
Gallup	April 5, 1959	–	–	12%	28%	9%	27%	5%	11% (Note: Combined for Orval Faubus, Hubert Humphrey, Robert Meyner, and G. Mennen Williams)	9%
Gallup	May 18, 1959	–	5%	10%	25%	13%	26%	7%	6% (Note: Combined for G. Mennen Williams, Orval Faubus, and Robert Meyner)	8%
Gallup	June 10, 1959	–	6%	–	26%	12%	29%	4%	6% (Note: Combined for Robert Meyner and G. Mennen Williams)	8%
Gallup	July 9, 1959	–	4%	11%	29%	14%	25%	6%	4% (Note: Combined for Robert Meyner and G. Mennen Williams)	7%
Gallup	Aug. 14, 1959	2%	5%	9%	26%	12%	26%	7%	6% (Note: Robert Meyner with 3%, G. Mennen Williams with 3%)	7%
Gallup	Sep. 27, 1959	1%	5%	9%	30%	10%	26%	6%	8%	5%
Gallup	Nov. 18, 1959	3%	4%	10%	27%	11%	26%	6%	5% (Note: G. Mennen Williams with 3% and Robert Meyner with 2%)	8%
Gallup	Dec. 18, 1959	3%	4%	10%	24%	14%	26%	5%	4% (Note: Robert Meyner with 2% and G. Mennen Williams with 2%)	10%
Gallup	Jan. 29, 1960	2%	5%	6%	32%	12%	28%	6%	3% (Note: G. Mennen Williams with 2% and Robert Meyner with 1%)	6%
Gallup	Feb. 26, 1960	–	6%	6%	35%	13%	23%	5%	5% (Note: Robert Meyner with 2%; Pat Brown, G. Mennen Williams, Wayne Morse, and Chester Bowles combined for 3%)	7%
Gallup	March 27, 1960	3%	5%	–	34%	15%	23%	6%	6%	8%
Gallup	April 20, 1960	3%	7%	–	39%	11%	21%	6%	5%	8%
Gallup	May 27, 1960	–	7%	–	41%	11%	21%	7%	9%	4%

==== Two-way races ====
Kennedy v. Kefauver

Poll source	Date(s)	Estes Kefauver	John F. Kennedy	Undecided
Gallup	Feb. 7, 1958	35%	56%	9%

Kennedy v. Johnson

Poll source	Date(s)	Lyndon Johnson	John F. Kennedy	Undecided
Gallup	Feb. 28, 1960	32%	58%	10%

Kennedy v. Stevenson

Poll source	Date(s)	John F. Kennedy	Adlai Stevenson	Undecided
Gallup	Dec. 3, 1958	42%	42%	16%
Gallup	Feb. 6, 1959	44%	45%	1%
Gallup	June 12, 1959	45%	44%	11%
Gallup	Feb. 28, 1960	50%	43%	7%
Look magazine	June 21, 1960	59%	20%	21%

Johnson v. Symington

Poll source	Date(s)	Lyndon Johnson	Stuart Symington	Undecided
Gallup	February 28, 1960	47%	28%	25%

=== Statewide polling ===
==== West Virginia ====
Poll source	Date(s)	Sample size (Note: Key: A – all adults RV – registered voters LV – likely voters V – unclear)	Hubert Humphrey	John F. Kennedy	Other	Undecided
The Fayette Tribune	May 6, 1960	181 A in Fayette County	24%	38%	–	39%

==== Wisconsin ====
Poll source	Date(s)	Sample size	Hubert Humphrey	John F. Kennedy	Lyndon Johnson	Adlai Stevenson	Stuart Symington	Other	Undecided
Sen. William Proxmire	Aug 5, 1959	1,311 A	17%	43%	4%	29%	7%	–	–

== Schedule and results ==
=== States by winner ===
Date	Contest	Pledged delegates	John F. Kennedy	Lyndon Johnson	Pat Brown	Hubert Humphrey	George Smathers	Michael DiSalle	George H. McLain	Unpledged	Others	Total
March 8	New Hampshire primary	11	11 43,372	–	–	–	–	–		–	7,527	50,899
April 5	Wisconsin primary	31	23 476,024	–	–	8 366,753	–	–		–		842,777
April 12	Illinois preference primary	0	34,332	–	–	4,283	–	–		–	14,552	53,167
April 12	Illinois delegate primary	69	[data missing]
April 19	New Jersey primary	0	–	–	–	–	–	–		217,608		217,608
April 26	Massachusetts primary	41	41 91,607	–	–	794	–	–		–	6,762	99,163
April 26	Pennsylvania primary	83	183,073	–	–	13,860	–	–		–	59,880	256,813
May 3	Indiana primary	34	353,832	–	–	–	–	–		–	82,937	436,769
May 3	Ohio primary	64	–	–	–	–	–	315,312		–		315,312
May 3	Washington D.C. primary	9	–	–	–	8,239	–	–		–	6,127	14,366
May 8	Texas caucuses	61	–	61	–	–	–	–	–	–	–
May 10	Nebraska primary	16	80,408	–	–	3,202	–	–		–	7,082	90,692
May 10	West Virginia primary	25	236,510	–	–	152,187	–	–		–		388,697
May 17	Maryland primary	24	201,769	–	–	–	–	–		24,350	49,420	275,539
May 20	Oregon primary	17	146,663	–	–	16,319	–	–		–		162,982
May 24	Florida primary	29	–	–	–	–	322,235	–		–		322,235
June 7	California primary	81	–	–	1,354,031	–	–	–	646,387	–		2,000,418
June 7	South Dakota primary	11	–	–	–	24,773	–	–		–		24,773
	TOTALS		1,847,259		1,354,031	590,410	322,235	315,312	646,387	241,958	369,072	5,686,664

== Primary race ==
From the outset of the campaign, Kennedy's religion played a major role. Happy Chandler, the governor of Kentucky and a major power broker in the party, emphatically stated that Kennedy could not win Kentucky due to his Catholicism.

=== New Hampshire: March 8 ===
Kennedy faced trivial opposition in the neighboring state of New Hampshire and won overwhelmingly. While campaigning in Madison, Wisconsin, Kennedy expressed enthusiasm about the New Hampshire results: "I'm very happy about it; we did better than I thought we would."

=== Wisconsin: April 5 ===
1960 Wisconsin Democratic presidential primary
- April 5, 1960

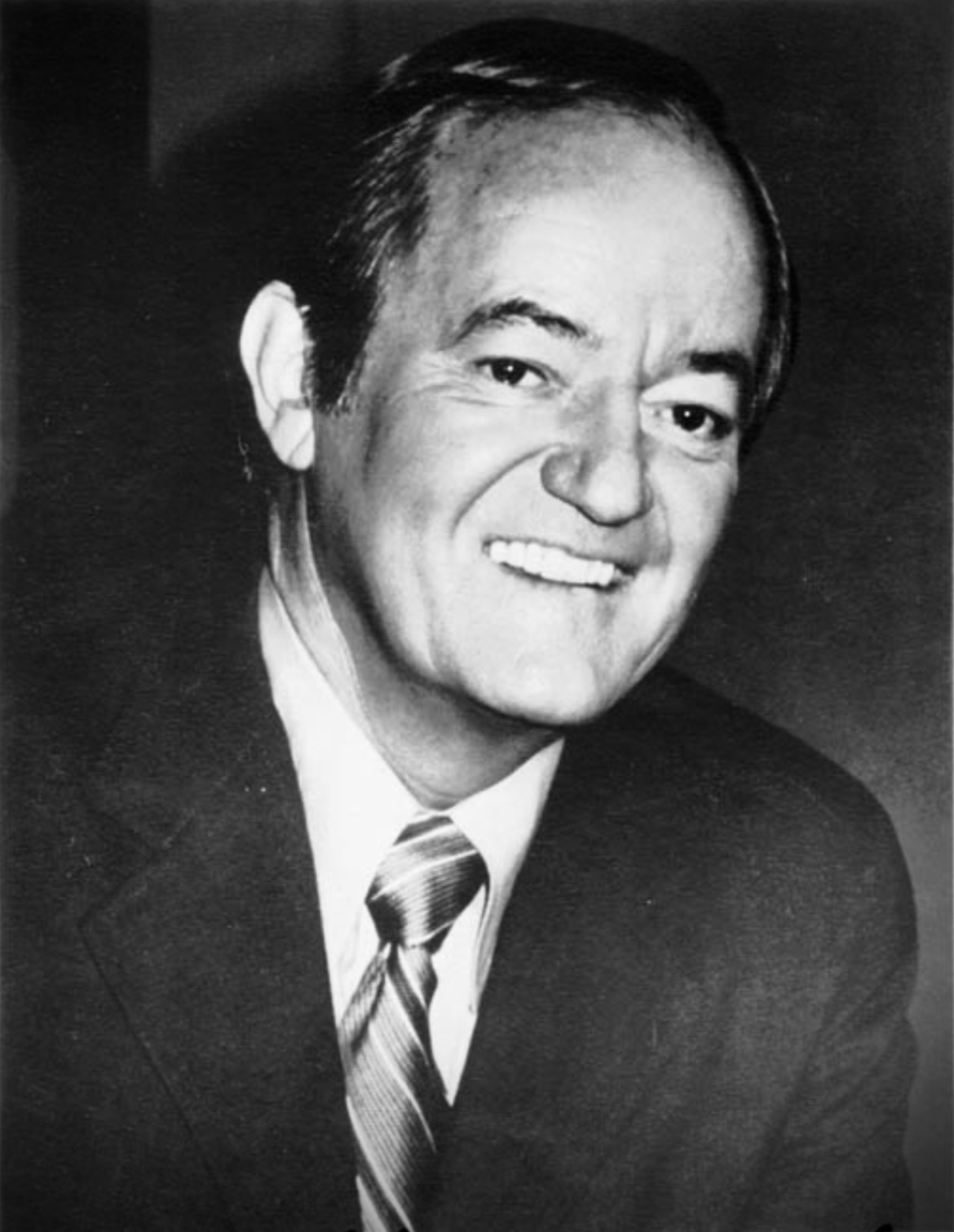
Candidate	John F. Kennedy	Hubert Humphrey
Home state	Massachusetts	Minnesota
Popular vote	476,024	366,753
Percentage	56.48%	43.52%
- County results Kennedy: Kennedy—50–60% Kennedy—60–70% Kennedy—70–80% Humphrey: Humphrey—50–60% Humphrey—60–70% Humphrey—70–80%

The first sharply contested popular primary was in Wisconsin, where Kennedy faced Humphrey on April 5.

Kennedy had begun building campaign operations in the state as early as June 1959, when he hired Jerry Bruno, the organizer behind William Proxmire's election to the Senate, and laid the groundwork for a campaign headquarters in Milwaukee. Kennedy formally announced his intention to run in Wisconsin on January 21, intending to show popular support for his campaign. The wealthy Kennedy was far better funded than Humphrey, a man of relatively modest means. Kennedy was also supported by his wealthy and glamorous extended family and friends; in his memoirs, Humphrey later lamented that "Muriel and I and our 'plain folks' entourage were no match for the glamour of Jackie Kennedy and the other Kennedy women, for Peter Lawford ... and Frank Sinatra singing their commercial 'High Hopes'. Jack Kennedy brought family and Hollywood to Wisconsin. The people loved it and the press ate it up." Humphrey nevertheless believed that by beating Kennedy in Wisconsin, he could blunt the latter's momentum and overtake him in later primaries.

In Wisconsin, Kennedy won with the support of Catholic voters, including some Republican Catholics who voted in the Democratic primary. Days before the primary, Kennedy said it had been the "toughest, closest, most meaningful". However, some observers found his margin of victory unexpectedly narrow and attributed it solely to Catholic support, while Protestants had backed Humphrey, leaving questions about Kennedy's ability to carry the convention or the election in the fall. Humphrey remained in the race, setting up a second popular showdown in the more heavily Protestant state of West Virginia.

The Wisconsin race was covered in the documentary film Primary.

=== West Virginia: May 10 ===
1960 West Virginia Democratic presidential primary
- May 10, 1960

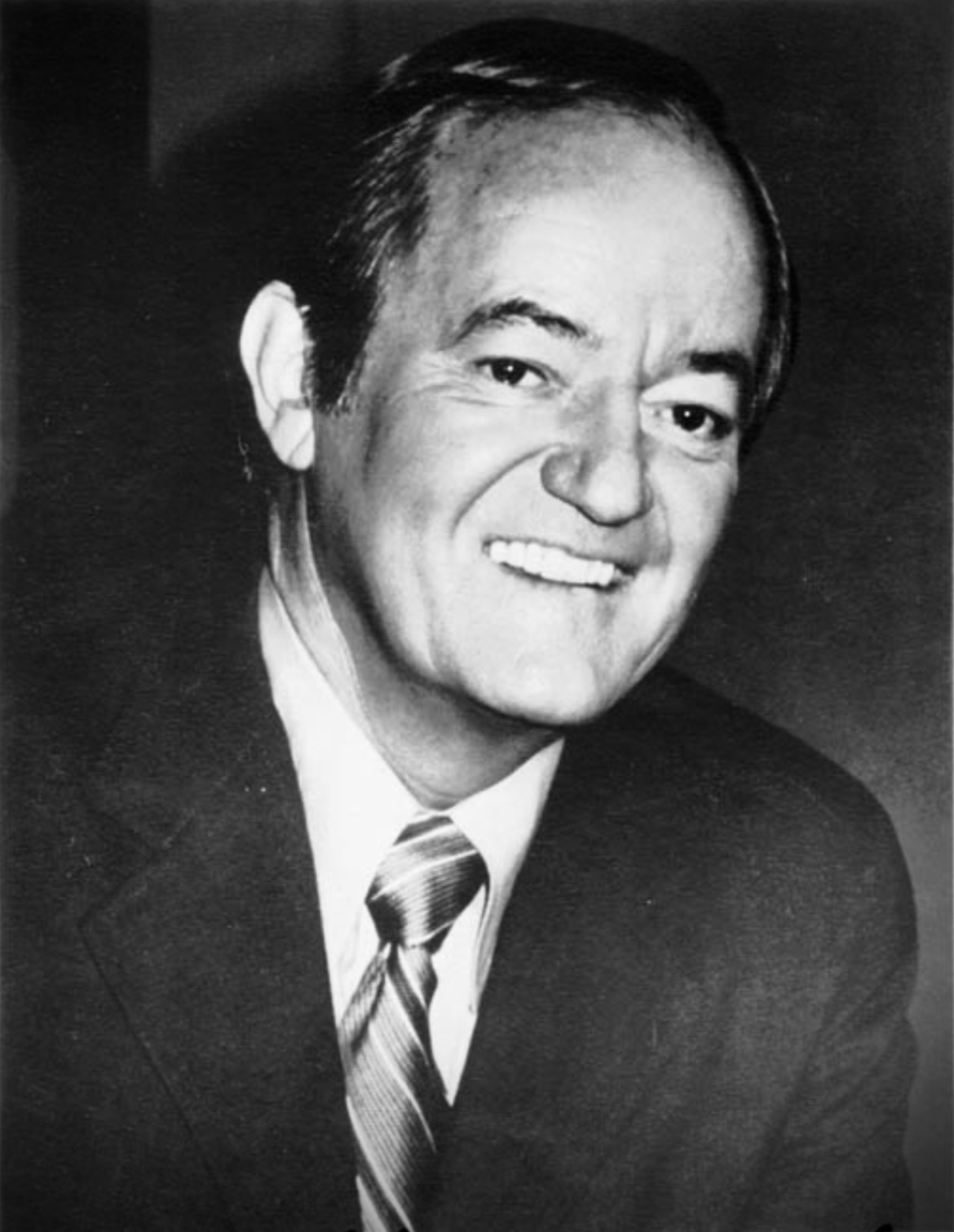
Candidate	John F. Kennedy	Hubert Humphrey
Home state	Massachusetts	Minnesota
Popular vote	236,510	152,187
Percentage	60.85%	39.15%
- County results Kennedy: Kennedy—50–60% Kennedy—60–70% Kennedy—70–80% Kennedy—80–90% Humphrey: Humphrey—50–60%

In West Virginia, Kennedy sought to show that he could win the support of Protestant voters and to remove Humphrey from the race, securing the party's liberal wing and setting up a showdown with Johnson for the nomination. Humphrey had high expectations, given that the state's population was rural, working class, ninety-five percent Protestant, and its delegates had backed him against Kennedy in the vice presidential contest four years prior.

Kennedy met the religious issue head-on, hoping to redefine the race as one of "tolerance against intolerance," rather than Catholic against Protestant. His father also brought Franklin Delano Roosevelt Jr. to campaign in the state; Roosevelt then raised the issue of Humphrey's failure to serve in World War II. Though Humphrey had tried and failed to serve due to physical disability, Roosevelt attacked his lack of service record, publicly telling audiences, "I don't know where [Humphrey] was in World War Two," and distributing flyers that accused him of draft dodging. After the primary was over, Roosevelt apologized to Humphrey and retracted the claims, which he later called his greatest political regret.

Kennedy continued to outspend Humphrey heavily in West Virginia; though he publicly claimed expenditures of $100,000, later estimates placed his family's overall spending at $1.5 million, dwarfing Humphrey's $23,000. Humphrey traveled the state in a rented bus, while the Kennedys used a family-owned airplane. Humphrey later wrote of the West Virginia campaign, "as a professional politician I was able to accept and indeed respect the efficacy of the Kennedy campaign. But underneath the beautiful exterior, there was an element of ruthlessness and toughness that I had trouble either accepting or forgetting."

On May 4, 1960, Humphrey and Kennedy took part in a televised one-on-one debate at WCHS-TV in Charleston, West Virginia, ahead of the state's primary.

Kennedy defeated Humphrey soundly in West Virginia, and Humphrey announced his withdrawal from the race that night.

== Convention ==
=== Presidential nomination ===
Presidential tally:

- John F. Kennedy: 806 (52.89%)
- Lyndon B. Johnson: 409 (26.84%)
- Stuart Symington: 86 (5.64%)
- Adlai Stevenson: 80 (5.25%)
- Robert B. Meyner: 43 (2.82%)
- Hubert Humphrey: 42 (2.76%)
- George Smathers: 30 (1.97%)
- Ross Barnett: 23 (1.51%)
- Herschel C. Loveless: 2 (0.13%)
- Pat Brown, Orval E. Faubus, Albert Dean Rosellini: each 1 vote

=== Vice-presidential nomination ===
Kennedy announced Lyndon B. Johnson as his choice of running-mate on the afternoon following his nomination. Johnson was nominated by acclamation that evening.

== See also ==
- 1960 Republican Party presidential primaries
