= Record Delta =

Newspaper in Buckhannon, West Virginia

- Type: Semi-daily
- Owner: News Media Corporation
- Founded: 1876
- Headquarters: 2B Clarksburg Rd Buckhannon WV 26201
- Circulation: 3,475 (as of 2016)
- Website: therecorddelta.com

The Record Delta is a newspaper serving Buckhannon, West Virginia, and surrounding Upshur County. Published Monday, Wednesday, and Friday, it has a circulation of 3,475 and is owned by News Media Corporation.

== History ==
The Record Delta is the merger of the Buckhannon Record and the Republican Delta. The Buckhannon Record was founded in 1876. In the 1910s it had the distinction of being an early West Virginia newspaper to be helmed by a female editor, Minnie Kendall Lowther. Commenting on the paper's leadership in 1918. the Exponent Telegram stated: "The Buckhannon Record, edited by a woman, is.one of the best of northern West Virginia weeklies and it is high time that women were taking more active part in newspaperdom generally throughout West Virginia."

In March 1977, the Buckhannon Record combined with the Republican Delta to form the Record Delta.

In both 2016 and 2017, the paper won the West Virginia Press Association's General Excellence Award in Division IV (under 4,000 circulation).

It has been sourced for reporting by the Charleston Gazette-Mail as recently as April 2018, and is considered a paper of public record by the State of West Virginia.

On August 14, 2018, News Media Corporation announced that James Austin would take over as the publisher of The Record Delta, Mountain Statesman, The Weston Democrat.

== See also ==
- List of newspapers in West Virginia
