= McClain Printing Company =

American Company

- Founded: 1958
- Headquarters: Parsons, West Virginia
- Key people: Ken and Faith Reynolds McClain
- Website: mcclainprinting.com

The McClain Printing Company (MPC) is a printing company specializing in books of West Virginia history and lore. It was incorporated in 1958 in Parsons, West Virginia as an outgrowth of the local weekly newspaper, the Parsons Advocate.

Ken Smith is the current president and CEO.

== History ==
In 1943, Ken and Faith Reynolds McClain had bought the Parsons Advocate which had been founded in 1896. Mr. McClain was approached around 1957 by West Virginia University professors who feared that early local West Virginia histories would be lost if they were not reprinted. In 1958, the newspaper undertook the reprinting of Alexander Scott Withers’ classic history, Chronicles of Border Warfare, as its first venture in book publishing. When McClain retired in the early 1970s, his son-in-law and daughter, George and Mariwyn Smith, moved to Parsons. George took over the printing company, and Mariwyn took over the newspaper, where she served as editor from 1971 to 2004. When George Smith retired in 1997, son Kenneth E. Smith became the third generation to operate the company.

During its first 35 years, the MPC produced comprehensive county histories of over 35 West Virginia counties, as well as thousands of other titles. These included the works of West Virginia poet laureate Louise McNeill, folklorists such as Ruth Ann Musick and James Gay Jones, bestselling volumes such as Howard B. Lee’s Bloodletting in Appalachia and Roy B. Clarkson’s Tumult on the Mountains, and reprints of classic local histories by W.C. Dodrill, Wills DeHass, Hu Maxwell, and others.

Commercial printing was added as a service several years ago. Today, the MPC pursues offset printing, a book binding service, a typesetting service, and magazine and book publishing and printing. Much of their printing services consist of commercial printing such as pamphlets, catalogs, pocket folders, magazines, post cards, brochures, flyers, etc. Although MPC does occasionally still finance historical books or reprints, it is now predominantly a private book publisher. It does not take profits from any of its author's book sales as “vanity presses” do. MPC products may be found on offer throughout the United States.
