= Greenbrier Valley Ranger =

- Type: Daily newspaper
- Format: Broadsheet
- Owner(s): Greenbrier Daily Newspapers Inc.
- Publisher: Judy K. Steele
- Editor: Theresa Flerx
- Founded: 1981
- Ceased publication: June 3, 2020
- Headquarters: 188 Foster Street, Lewisburg, WV 24901
- Circulation: 24,053 (as of 2016)
- Website: wvdn.net

The Greenbrier Valley Ranger is a defunct newspaper that served Lewisburg, West Virginia and the surrounding area. Published weekly, it had a circulation of 24,053 in 2016 and was owned by Greenbrier Daily Newspapers, Inc., along with the West Virginia Daily News. The newspaper ceased publication in 2020.

== See also ==
- List of newspapers in West Virginia
