= Pennsboro News =

Newspaper in Pennsboro, West Virginia

- Type: Weekly newspaper
- Owner(s): West Central Publishing, Inc.
- Founder: Will A. Strickler
- Founded: 1890s
- Headquarters: Franklin, West Virginia
- Circulation: 3,976 (as of 2016)
- Website: ritchiecountynews.com

The Pennsboro News is a newspaper serving Pennsboro, West Virginia, and surrounding Ritchie County. Published weekly, it has a paid circulation of 3,976 and is owned by West Central Publishing, Inc.

== History ==
The paper's history dates back to the 1890s. Founded as the Lever, by Will A. Strickler, and sold to a man named Smith who changed its name to the Pennsboro News, it changed names ownership a number of times before falling to J. A. Wooddell. D. A. Fawcett, an editor at the paper, bought it in 1899. Wooddell, former editor of the Roxboro Courier, took over the paper in 1901. In 1906, the paper's facilities were destroyed by fire, but Woodell immediately purchased a new plant.

By 1911, it was the only paper in Pennsboro. In 1915, the paper was sold to Gordon Fought, who took over the editorship as well.

== See also ==
- List of newspapers in West Virginia
