= Noyant-et-Aconin =

- Part of Bernoy-le-Château
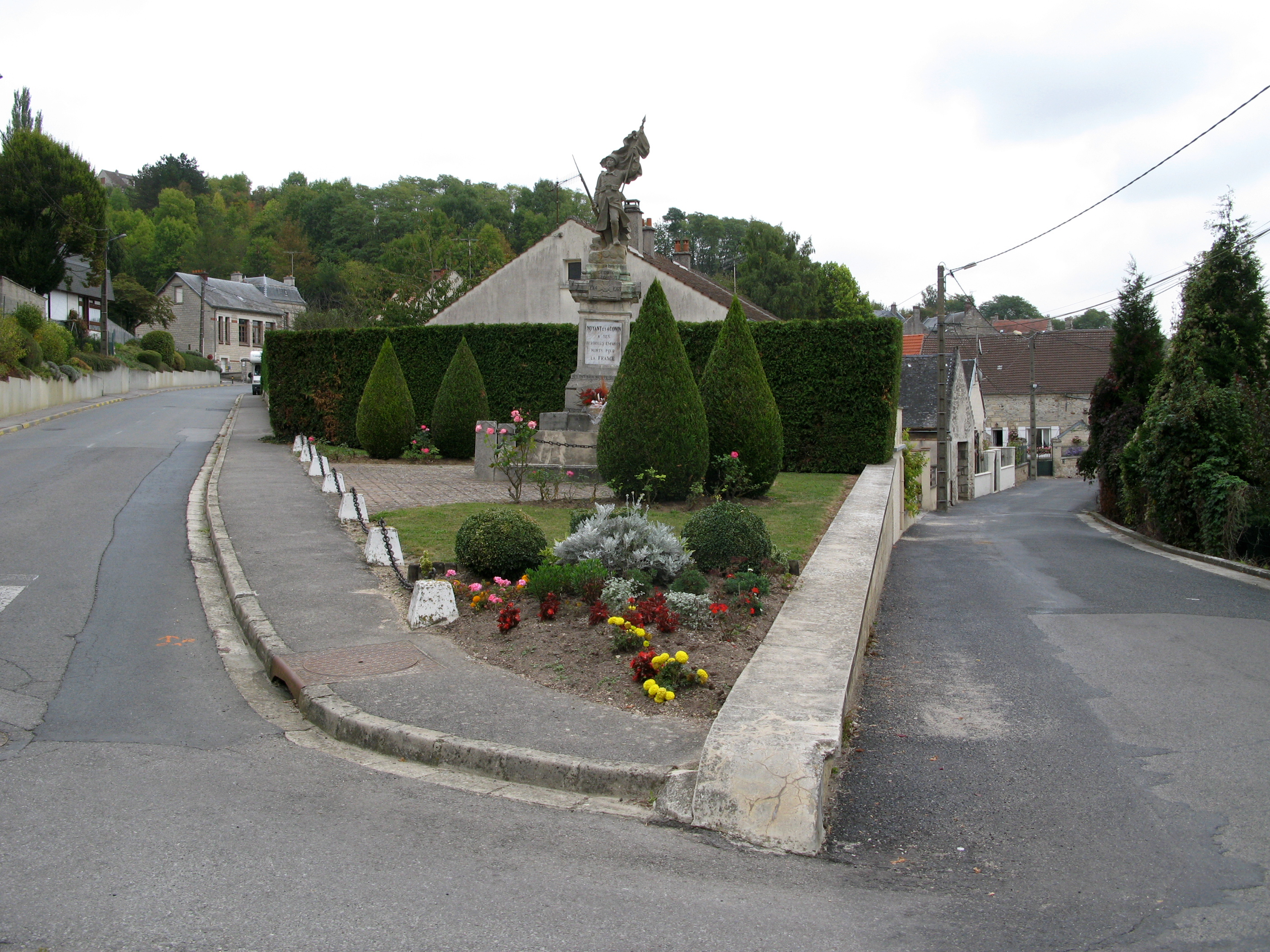
- The monument to the dead of Noyant-et-Aconin
- Location of Noyant-et-Aconin
- Location within France Location within Hauts-de-France
- Coordinates: 49°19′59″N 3°20′06″E
- Country: France
- Region: Hauts-de-France
- Department: Aisne
- Arrondissement: Soissons
- Canton: Soissons-2
- Commune: Bernoy-le-Château
- Area^{1}: 4.6 km^{2} (1.8 sq mi)
- Elevation: 72 m (236 ft)
- Highest elevation: 161 m (528 ft)
- Lowest elevation: 55 m (180 ft)
- Population (2021): 482
  - Density: 100/km^{2} (270/sq mi)
- Time zone: UTC+01:00 (CET)
  - Summer (DST): UTC+02:00 (CEST)
- Postal code: 02200
- ^{1} French Land Register data, which excludes lakes, ponds, glaciers > 1 km^{2} (0.386 sq mi or 247 acres) and river estuaries.

Noyant-et-Aconin (French pronunciation: [nwajɑ̃ e akɔnɛ̃]) is a former commune in the Aisne department in Hauts-de-France in northern France. On 1 January 2023, it was merged into the new commune of Bernoy-le-Château.

During World War I, American politician-turned-soldier Roy Earl Parrish was killed here in 1918.

== See also ==
- Communes of the Aisne department
