= Joseph W. Gallaher =

American businessman and politician

Joseph W. Gallaher

Joseph Wesley Gallaher (23 August 1826 – 31 May 1892) was a successful businessman of Moundsville, West Virginia, who held prominence in affairs of state and local politics and government.

== Early life ==
Gallaher was born in Ohio County, Virginia to John and Rachel (Hurst) Gallaher, natives of Ireland and Maryland, respectively.

In 1834, Mr. Gallaher came to Moundsville, and was educated in the common schools and the academy of Revs. Nicholas Murray and Irwin Carson.

== Business ==
He embarked in business on his own account in 1848 and was still running the business in 1890. The business sold wool and grain. He had a reputation for strength of character and integrity and his business made him prosperous.

== Political life ==
The same qualities, added to an unfailing tact in dealing with men, and fluency as a public speaker, brought him to great prominence in the political life of West Virginia. His first public office was serving as a member in the county court of Virginia for six years. He later became the mayor of Moundsville, and in 1856, was on the ticket of Millard Fillmore as a candidate for presidential elector for the Fifteenth District of Virginia. After the American Civil War he was among the first who resolved upon the reorganization of the Democratic Party of West Virginia as a controlling influence in the state.

He also served as a member, secretary, and treasurer of the first state executive committee for ten to twelve years, and he was a power in the organization of his party. In 1868, he was a delegate and vice president from Virginia to the Democratic National Convention that nominated Horatio Seymour, and in 1872, with Judge A. F. Haymond, represented the second senatorial district in the constitutional convention of West Virginia, which framed the present constitution of the state. He served on the committees on taxation, finance, corporations, education and schedule. In 1876 he was appointed one of the committee of three to equalize the state assessment of lands by Governor John J. Jacob.

Gallaher served as president of the board of directors of the West Virginia penitentiary for ten years. His readiness and tact as a speaker was frequently called upon; in 1869, he was called to visit Columbus, Ohio to present Judge Thurman with a fine goldheaded cane. Mr. Gallaher also was socially popular. He married Emily J., daughter of Col. John Thompson of Belmont County, Ohio, in November, 1866 and had two children: John T. and Joseph W.

== Religion ==
In regard to religion, he was an attendant of the Episcopal Church, of which his wife was a member and he, a vestryman.
