= Industrial News =

Newspaper in Iaeger, West Virginia

- Type: Weekly newspaper
- Owner: Moffitt Newspapers
- Founded: 1923
- Ceased publication: 2017
- Headquarters: 127 Main Ave., Pineville, WV 24874
- Circulation: 972

The Industrial News was a newspaper serving Iaeger, West Virginia, and surrounding McDowell County. Published weekly, it had a 2016 circulation of 972 and was owned by Moffitt Newspapers. It ceased publishing in March 2017.

== History ==
The paper was started in 1923 by R. R. Cauble, previously of the Miners Journal. Originally published in Coeburn, Virginia, the paper was initially moved to Pocahontas County in early 1926, after its 1925 sale to editor James A. Johnson. It was subsequently moved to Iaeger in September 1926. Johnson, who was made a member of the 50 year club of the West Virginia State Newspaper Council in 1941, sold the paper in 1945 and retired, dying two years later.

The paper does not appear to have ever had a website. In recent years it had been run by Moffett Newspapers, under publisher Melissa Nester.

== See also ==
- List of newspapers in West Virginia
