= The Shinnston News and Harrison County Journal =

Newspaper in Shinnston, West Virginia

- Type: Weekly newspaper
- Owner: Harrison County Publishing Co
- Founded: 1898
- Headquarters: 223 Pike St Shinnston, WV
- Circulation: 2,782
- OCLC number: 12877341
- Website: shinnstonnews.com

The Shinnston News is a newspaper serving Shinnston, West Virginia, and surrounding Harrison County. Published weekly, it has a circulation of 2,782 and is owned by Harrison County Publishing Co.

== History ==
The News was founded in 1898 as a weekly, and taken over by W. A. Meredith in 1902. In 1909, R.C. Walker came on as editor and manager, with Meredith retaining control. Two other generations of Merediths owned and operated the paper before 1980, when the business was sold to James Jackson and Boyd Dotson.

Since 2014, the publisher is Michael Showell, with Leigh Merrifield as the editor. Merrifield is a fourth generation descendant of W. A. Meredith. Showell is owner of Mountain Media, a Lewisburg newspaper firm which operates a number of papers in West Virginia.

== Awards ==
In 1999, then publisher Kim Germondo, was named the West Virginia's Media Advocate of the Year by the U.S. Small Business Administration.

== See also ==
- List of newspapers in West Virginia
