= Weston Democrat =

Weekly newspaper published in Weston, West Virginia

- Type: Weekly newspaper
- Format: Broadsheet
- Owner(s): NCWV Media
- Publisher: Andy Knicely
- Editor: Rebecca Young
- Founded: 1868
- Headquarters: 306 Main Ave, Weston, WV 26452
- Circulation: 6,000
- ISSN: 2373-1052
- OCLC number: 11200866
- Website: westondemocrat.com

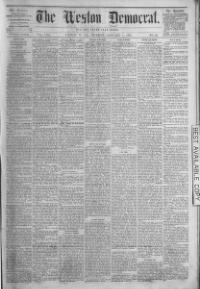
clipping from The Weston Democrat, January 1875

The Weston Democrat is a newspaper serving the Weston, West Virginia community. It is published each Wednesday and has a circulation of about 6,000.

== History ==
Founded as the Expositor in the days immediately after the Civil War, the paper was renamed the Democrat after a purchase and 1868 relaunch by Union veterans George Cozad and James W. Woffindin with the masthead motto "The government is best which governs least." After other state papers named themselves "The Democrat" the paper added the "Weston" to its name for clarification.

Cozad had left the paper in 1870, but Woffindin stayed on, despite his growing unease with the Democratic party the paper supported. In 1875, Woffindin broke with the party and with the paper. Thomas A. Edwards, a local judge, bought the four page paper, and reasserted its Democratic principles. The paper was bought by former Democrat employee Harrison and Robert Bland, although the latter sold his interest after a short period. Thomas Edwards, though selling the paper to Harrison, would remain editor until his death in 1900. As publisher, Harrison expanded the publication schedule and changed the style of the paper, to the acclaim of the neighboring Weekly Register, which proclaimed "it is now a very creditable journal, and the Register wishes The Weston Democrat Publishing Company, R H. Harrison, manager, abundant success."

Harrison, however, was done with the paper, selling it in 1904 to the eldest son of Thomas Edwards.

The paper was sold to Robert Billeter in 1985. Billeter made many improvements, including moving to electronic production and launching the paper's first website in 1999. He retired in 2016 at the age of 90, selling the business to Weston Publishing. The newspaper was sold again in 2019 to NCWV Media.

== See also ==
- List of newspapers in West Virginia
