= Nicholas Chronicle =

Newspaper in Summersville, West Virginia

- Type: Weekly newspaper
- Owner: Nicholas Co. Publishing Company
- Editor: Raymond W. Corbin
- Founded: 1880
- Headquarters: 718 Broad St., Summersville, WV 26651
- Circulation: 7,481 (as of 2016)
- Website: nicholaschronicle.com

The Nicholas Chronicle is a newspaper serving Summersville, West Virginia, and surrounding Nicholas County. Published weekly, it had a paid circulation of 7,481 in 2016 and is owned by Nicholas Co. Publishing Company, Inc. It is the largest weekly newspaper in West Virginia.

== History ==
Founded in 1880 as a Democratic weekly by Howard Templeton, it was acquired in 1891 by D.A. and John Grose. John had learned the trade as a printer at the paper. By 1919, it was the only newspaper in the town, and was edited by A. L. Stewart. Stewart owned and edited it until 1921, introducing a number of improvements, including motorized printing, before moving on to the Braxton Democrat.

In 1956, the paper was sold to two attorneys, Joseph Berzito and Roland Clapperton.

From 1991 to 2002 it was edited by Charles W. Yeager, who increased readership from 4,500 to more than 10,000, making it the largest weekly in the state.

It is currently edited by Raymond W. Corbin.

== See also ==
- List of newspapers in West Virginia
