= Wirt County Journal =

Newspaper in Elizabeth, West Virginia

- Type: Weekly newspaper
- Founder(s): Fred Haverty and George Roberts
- Founded: 1908
- Headquarters: 430 Court St, Elizabeth, WV 26143
- Circulation: 2,094 (as of 2016)
- Website: wirtjournal.com

The Wirt County Journal is a newspaper serving Elizabeth, West Virginia, and surrounding Wirt County. Published weekly, it has a circulation of 2,094 and is owned by Little Kanawha Publishing Inc.

== History ==
Founded in 1908 as a Democratic paper by Fred Haverty and George Roberts, it was sold in 1917 to Ross Wilson and C. H. Snodgrass. Wilson, who at various times during his tenure as publisher was also a local teacher and school superintendent, edited the journal for the next 28 years.

In 1914, a fire started by a gas explosion wiped out the newspaper's offices along with those of the Elizabeth Messenger, causing $50,000 worth of damage.

Ross Wilson retired from the business in 1946, turning the paper over to his son, Woodrow "Woody" Wilson, an Army Air Corps fighter pilot returning from World War II. During Woody's tenure the paper acquired and merged with the Kanawha News. By 1960, it was the only newspaper in Wirt County, a fact made more salient by the county's lack of either a local radio or television station.

Woody Wilson retired in 1983.

The staff of the journal has served as local experts on the culture of Wirt County for the national press, particularly during the homecoming of Jessica Lynch, a Wirt County native.

== See also ==
- List of newspapers in West Virginia
