= St. Marys Oracle =

Newspaper in St Marys, West Virginia

- Type: Weekly newspaper
- Owner: West Central Publishing Inc.
- Founded: 1877
- Headquarters: 206 George St, St Marys, WV
- Circulation: 2,006 (as of 2016)
- Website: oracleandleader.com

The St. Marys Oracle is a newspaper serving St Marys, West Virginia, and surrounding Pleasants County. Published weekly, it has a circulation of 2,006 and is owned by West Central Publishing Inc.

== History ==
The paper was established in 1877 as the Democratic weekly The Observer by M. P. Prettyman, who bought the printing plant of the failed West Virginia Methodist Protestant. Prettyman, a schoolteacher who had developed an interest in typography, taught himself over a series of weekends to set type and run the press. He would later change the paper's to The Oracle in 1881.

The paper passed through a number of owner's before becoming R. A. Gallagher purchased it and changed the name to the St Marys Oracle in 1885. For a period of 15 years Gallagher ran it, selling a half interest to Robert L. Pemberton in 1902 who managed it from that time forward, buying the full interest in 1909.

By 1920 it had a paid circulation of 1,000.

In 2003, the paper sued the Pleasants school board, claiming it had violated the state's Sunshine Laws by not providing adequate details in a meeting where layoffs were proposed. The two parties were able to resolve the lawsuit out of court, with the paper agreeing that the omission had been unintentional.

== See also ==
- List of newspapers in West Virginia
