= Times West Virginian =

- Type: Daily newspaper
- Format: Broadsheet
- Owner: Community Newspaper Holdings Inc.
- Publisher: Terri Hale
- Editor: Eric Cravey
- Founded: June 27, 1866
- Headquarters: 300 Quincy Street; Fairmont, West Virginia 26554; United States
- Circulation: 10,571 (as of 2016)
- OCLC number: 13032698
- Website: timeswv.com

The Times West Virginian is a four-day morning daily newspaper based in Fairmont, West Virginia, which also covers the city of Bridgeport, West Virginia, and surrounding communities in Marion, Monongalia, Taylor and Harrison counties, West Virginia. The paper was founded as the Fairmont Times and West Virginian through the merging of the long-running Fairmont Times and Fairmont West Virginian in 1975. It adopted its current name in 1976.

Thomson Newspapers purchased the Times West Virginian in 1963; when Thomson left the newspaper business in 2000, the paper was sold to current owner Community Newspaper Holdings Inc.

== Awards ==
The Times West Virginian was named Newspaper of the Year by its parent company in 2006. Judges said it was "packed full of local stories with and about ordinary people," offering a strong sense of community. The Times competed against a host of other papers owned by CNHI.

Also in 2006, the paper won second place in the general excellence category of the West Virginia Press Association's Better Newspaper's Contest. The paper was beaten by The Inter-Mountain, a daily in Elkins.

== Corridor Magazine ==
In October 2005, the Times West Virginian began Corridor Magazine, a regional lifestyles magazine focusing on Monongalia, Harrison, Taylor and Marion counties in West Virginia. The magazine was edited by Hope Stephen, also the paper's managing editor. One of its early senior contributing writers, Mary Wade Burnside, later became a full-time staffer at the paper and then was promoted to Corridor's editor in May 2006, after Stephan left the paper.

Corridor is published under the name of Impact Publishing and Marketing.

== Noted reporters and contributors ==
=== John Veasey ===
In 2006, John Veasey, a reporter and editor with the paper since 1960, won the Adam R. Kelly Premier Journalist Award, the West Virginia Press Associations' highest honor.

The award was established in 1991 in memory of Adam R. Kelly, who was the owner and editor of the Tyler Star News in Sistersville. Kelly was known nationally for his outstanding service to newspapers.

=== Mickey Furfari ===
Mickey has covered the West Virginia University Mountaineer sports teams for decades.

=== Ruth Ann Musick ===
Musick wrote a folklore column, "The Old Folks Say".

== See also ==
- List of newspapers in West Virginia
