= Monroe Watchman =

- Type: Weekly newspaper
- Owner(s): The Monroe Watchman, Inc.
- Founded: 1872
- Headquarters: 430 Main Street., Union, WV 24983
- Circulation: 3,652 (as of 2016)
- Website: themonroewatchman.com

The Monroe Watchman is a newspaper serving Union, West Virginia, and surrounding Monroe County. Published weekly, it has a circulation of 3,652 and is owned by The Monroe Watchman, Inc.

== History ==
Originally named the Border Watchman, the Monroe Watchman was founded by Elbert Fowler in February 1872. Fowler, who was known for an "irascibility of temper that amounted to an infirmity," had learned the newspaper trade from his brother, Isaac Chapman Fowler at the Bristol News in Bristol, Tennessee. Moving to Union he established the four page Democratic weekly, which in its initial years it was known for a vicious back and forth with other local paper the Register, run at that time by Richard Burke. Due to an altercation with Burke, the two engaged in a pistol fight where neither was wounded. Fowler quit the newspaper business in 1874, and moved to lawyering, later dying of blood poisoning brought on by an 1885 duel over a political squabble that resulted in a charge of slander.

The title changed to Monroe County Watchman in 1884 and to Monroe Watchman in 1897.

The paper was sold to Charles M. Johnston in 1874, who subsequently passed it on to his son, Albert Sidney Johnston, who would publish the paper for almost 50 years, before passing it on to his son J. Malcolm Johnston.

In 1965, long-time editor Harold Mohler purchased J. Malcolm's stake in the paper. His son Craig took over the paper after his father's death from cancer at 64, and runs it to this day.

== See also ==
- List of newspapers in West Virginia
