= Wetzel Chronicle =

Newspaper serving New Martinsville, West Virginia, U.S.

- Type: Weekly newspaper
- Publisher: Eric Anderson
- Editor: Ed Parsons
- Founded: 1876
- Headquarters: 1100 Third Street, New Martinsville, WV
- Circulation: 4,630 (as of 2016)
- Website: wetzelchronicle.com

The Wetzel Chronicle is a newspaper serving New Martinsville, West Virginia, and surrounding Wetzel County. Published weekly, it has a circulation of 4,630 and is owned by Ogden Newspapers. Since April 2018, Eric Anderson has been the publisher.

== History ==
The paper is the merger two previous local newspapers, the Democrat which dates back to 1877, and the Republican, which traces its roots back to the founding of the Messenger in 1876.

The Wetzel Democrat was established as an eight-page Democratic weekly by Dan Long, with W. S. Wiley and Robert McEldowney as editors. Its early fame was based on McEldowney's editorials, which were widely syndicated, quoted, and discussed throughout the state. Born in 1837, McEldowney had been raised in Wetzel County had received a public education in the local schools before attending Marrietta College in Ohio. On the outbreak of the Civil War he had headed south to fight with the Confederacy's "Stonewall Regiment", and fought as a captain at the Battle of Gettysburg. An ardent Democrat, his editorials were known for both their wit (McEldowney once described the Republican party in the state as the only known instance of a "corpse attempting to commit suicide") and its oppositional stance to Democratic party leadership. McEldowney died in 1900, at which point C. G. Westerman took over as editor and publisher.

The Messenger was started 1876 by J. E. Hart. After selling it and then repurchasing it, Hart changed the name to the Wetzel Republican, a name under which it continued until its 1979 merger with the Democrat. The chief rival of the Democrat in its early years, it had a 1917 circulation of 1,300 to the Democrat's 1,800 in a county with a population of just over 20,000.

Merged in 1979 under the title of the Wetzel Chronicle, the first issue of the Chronicle was published on July 5 of that year. It has been owned by Ogden since at least 2001.

On August 13, 2018, Perry Nardo, former publisher and current regional publisher of the Wetzel Chronicle, won the Adam R. Kelly Award from the West Virginia Press Association. The Adam R. Kelly Award is the association's highest honor.

== See also ==
- List of newspapers in West Virginia
