= Bernoy-le-Château =

- Commune
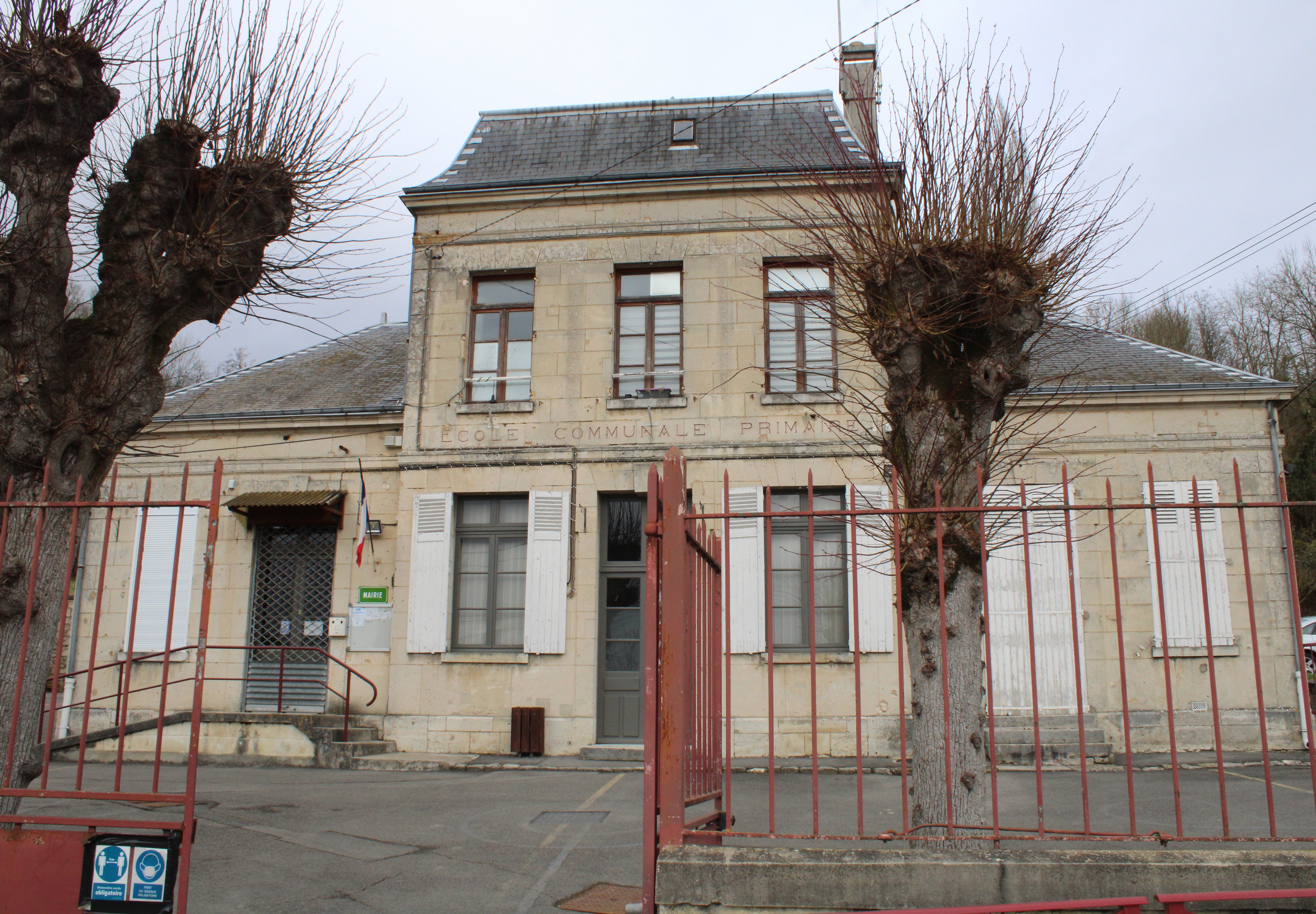
- Town hall of the commune nouvelle.
- Location of Bernoy-le-Château
- Location within France Location within Hauts-de-France
- Coordinates: 49°11′N 3°12′E
- Country: France
- Region: Hauts-de-France
- Department: Aisne
- Arrondissement: Soissons
- Canton: Soissons-2
- Intercommunality: GrandSoissons Agglomération

Government
  - Mayor (2026–32): Bernard Seruzier
- Area^{1}: 16.29 km^{2} (6.29 sq mi)
- Highest elevation: 161 m (528 ft)
- Lowest elevation: 52 m (171 ft)
- Population (2023): 825
  - Density: 50.6/km^{2} (131/sq mi)
- Time zone: UTC+01:00 (CET)
  - Summer (DST): UTC+02:00 (CEST)
- INSEE/Postal code: 02564 /02200
- ^{1} French Land Register data, which excludes lakes, ponds, glaciers > 1 km^{2} (0.386 sq mi or 247 acres) and river estuaries.

Bernoy-le-Château (French pronunciation: [bɛʁnwa lə ʃato]) is a commune in the department of Aisne in the Hauts-de-France region of northern France. It was established as a commune nouvelle on 1 January 2023 from the merger of the communes of Berzy-le-Sec and Noyant-et-Aconin.

== See also ==
- Communes of the Aisne department
