= Glenville Pathfinder =

Newspaper in Glenville, West Virginia

- Type: Weekly newspaper
- Owner: Glenville-Corcoran Newspapers
- Founder: Wat Warren
- Founded: 1892
- Headquarters: 108 North Court St., Glenville, WV 26351
- Circulation: 1,194 (as of 2016)
- Website: glenvillewv.com

The Glenville Pathfinder is a newspaper serving Glenville, West Virginia, and surrounding Gilmer County. Published weekly, it has a circulation of 1,194 and is owned by Glenville-Corcoran Newspapers.

== History ==
It was founded in 1892 as a weekly by Wat Warren, as a Republican weekly. By 1920, it had a circulation of 700 and was published by Hunter W. Brannon.

In 1971, it was bought (along with sister publication the Democrat) by two New York executives—one a banker and one an editor of a sporting magazine—looking to escape city life and settle in small-town West Virginia. Robert Arnold, the banker, was a former resident of the area returning home. Stanley Meseroll, who at the time was the managing editor of the New York-based Sports Afield, was drawn to the area's opportunities for hunting and fishing. The pair were able within a few short years to increase subscriptions from 2,000 to 3,400, and increase staff to five and a half employees, partially due to a streamlined billing and subscription process. The resulting publicity surrounding the move was enough of a point of pride to West Virginians that Senator Robert Byrd had press regarding the move read into the Senate Record.

== See also ==
- List of newspapers in West Virginia
