= Tyler Star News =

Newspaper in West Virginia, US

- Type: Weekly newspaper
- Owner: Ogden Newspapers
- Editor: Ed Parsons
- Founded: 1877
- Headquarters: 720 Wells Street, Sistersville, WV 26175
- Circulation: 2,735 (as of 2016)
- Website: tylerstarnews.com

The Tyler Star News is a newspaper serving Sistersville, West Virginia, and surrounding Tyler County. Published weekly, it has a circulation of 2,735 and is owned by Ogden Newspapers.

== History ==
The Star News is the result of the 1918 merger between the Tyler County News and the Tyler County Star. The News dated back to 1909, and the Star to 1877.

The West Virginia Press Association's highest honor, the Adam R. Kelly Premier Journalist Award, is named after Adam Kelly, former editor and publisher of the Star News. Kelly, a Logan County native who became editor of the paper in 1954, was recognized nationally for the quality of his editorial writing, and his Star News column "The Country Editor", was widely syndicated. He became publisher of the paper in 1964,

In 1979, Ogden Newspapers bought the paper. Kelly became an editorial writer for Ogden Newspapers and a board member of the National Newspaper Association. He died in 1990.

In 2009 Jonay Corley was made editor of the Tyler Star News. Corley had previously been a reporter for The Intelligencer and Wheeling News-Register, and had joined the Star News as a staff writer the year before.

== See also ==
- List of newspapers in West Virginia
