= Princeton Times =

Newspaper in Princeton, West Virginia

- Type: Weekly newspaper
- Owner: Community Newspaper Holdings
- Founded: 1961
- Headquarters: 213 South Walker Street, Princeton, WV
- Circulation: 1,390 (as of 2016)
- Website: ptonline.net

The Princeton Times is a newspaper serving Princeton, West Virginia, and surrounding Mercer County. Published weekly on Fridays, it has a circulation of 1,390 and is owned by Community Newspaper Holdings.

== History ==
The paper was launched as a daily in July 1961 with the help of Mercer County residents, 300 of whom bought stock in the new venture. Howard Imboden was set up as publisher. The paper was soon sold to southern firm holding over 30 local newspapers, citing need for more capital investment. It dropped its Sunday edition in 1963 and shifted to weekly publication in August 1964.

== See also ==
- List of newspapers in West Virginia
