= Moundsville Echo =

Newspaper in Moundsville, West Virginia

- Type: Weekly newspaper
- Format: Broadsheet
- Owner(s): Moundsville Echo, LLC
- Founder: James Davis Shaw
- Publisher: Charlie M. Walton
- Founded: 1891
- Language: English
- Headquarters: Moundsville, West Virginia
- Circulation: 2,750 (as of 2016)
- OCLC number: 13148366

The Moundsville Echo is a weekly newspaper serving Moundsville, West Virginia and surrounding Marshall County since 1891. The paper had a circulation of 2,750 in 2016. It is owned by Moundsville Echo, LLC and published by Charles M. Walton. In 2024, the daily newspaper briefly closed and relaunched as a weekly published on Thursdays.

== History ==
The Echo was founded in 1891 by James Davis Shaw as the Moundsville Echo, a weekly. In 1896, it went to daily publication. Shaw billed it as an independent paper, featuring the slogan "The news unbiased and unbossed" on the masthead.

On J.D. Shaw's death in 1917, the publication passed to his son, Samuel Craig Shaw. Shaw's politics were largely Democratic, and in those years he was a proponent of barring black voters to ensure a Democratic victory.

The paper was passed down in turn to Samuel Cockayne Shaw in 1951. In 1984, the Echo was up to a circulation of 5,000, published in a nine-column format and adhering to its publisher's penchant for Simplified Spelling. Sam C. Shaw, who was nicknamed the Flying Turtle because of his slow running, was a beloved tinkerer who was known for collecting news via his bike route. He designed and installed several electronic systems in the town, including the fire alarm system, which did not work during its unveiling ceremony. Shaw rigged the system using a toaster and the system worked, and continued to work for several years using the toaster. Sam C. Shaw operated the paper until his death in 1995.

After Shaw's death, the paper was published and edited by Charles "Charlie" L. Walton from 1995 until 2014; he died in 2019 at the age of 78. The paper was then published by his son Charlie M. Walton.

In June 2024, The Echo closed after 133 years in business due to a staff shortage. A handwritten note was left on the paper's office door that read “The Echo Is Permanently Closed Due To Lack of Help.” Walton said he and two part-timers were the paper's only employees. He was unsuccessful in hiring more workers and decided to stop publication. In July, Walton announced the paper would relaunch as a weekly and be renamed to the Moundsville Weekly Echo.

== See also ==
- List of newspapers in West Virginia
