= Morgan Messenger =

West Virginian newspaper

- Type: Weekly newspaper
- Format: Broadsheet
- Owner(s): The Morgan Messenger, Inc.
- Editor: Kate Shunney
- Founded: 1893
- Headquarters: 16 North Mercer St., Berkeley Springs, Morgan County, WV
- Circulation: 4,400 (as of 2016)
- OCLC number: 12637249
- Website: morganmessenger.com

The Morgan Messenger is a weekly newspaper published each Wednesday in Berkeley Springs, West Virginia. It has a circulation of about 4,400.

== History ==
The Morgan Messenger was founded in 1893 in Berkeley Springs, West Virginia as a Republican daily. It succeeded the Morgan Mercury, a weekly founded by C. H. Hodgman. Founded in 1885, the Mercury continued until much of its equipment was damaged in an October 1893 fire. Publishers Lewis Frey and Simeon S. Buzzerd bought the surviving equipment and business from D. Bratt Wright shortly after the fire, and changed the name to the Morgan Messenger. Buzzerd would publish and edit the paper until his death in 1959.

In 1934, Buzzerd bought its competitor the News, and continued it as a separate publication. The News cited economic pressures for the sale to Buzzerd, and while the printing of the paper moved to the Messenger plant, its editorial continued to be a Democratic alternative to the Messenger.

The paper has the distinction of being one of a small percentage of papers to have stayed in the control of a single family from the 19th century to the present. Until his death in 2016, it was owned by J. Warren Buzzerd, grandson of Simeon. It is currently managed by Sandy Buzzerd, the daughter-in-law of J. Warren and great-granddaughter-in-law of the founder.

== Resources ==
- List of newspapers in West Virginia
