= Pendleton Times =

The Pendleton Times
- Type: Weekly newspaper
- Owner(s): Mountain Media, LLC
- Publisher: Michael Showell
- Founded: 1913
- Headquarters: Franklin, West Virginia
- Circulation: 4,226 (as of 2016)
- ISSN: 2833-8987
- OCLC number: 1344434245
- Website: pendletontimes.com

The Pendleton Times is a newspaper serving Franklin, West Virginia, and surrounding Pendleton County. Published weekly, it has a circulation of 4,226 and is owned by Mountain Media, LLC.

The paper is Pendleton County's only newspaper and considered by the Pendleton County Commission as the local paper of record.

== History ==
Founded in 1913 as an independent newspaper by resident William McCoy, by 1921 it had a circulation of 1,715.

On April 17, 1924, the gasoline engine of the press at the Times ran out of fuel. The operator, rather than wait for the engine to cool, put the gasoline into the tank hot, causing it to burst into flames. The townspeople went to the fire control reservoir to try to contain the fire, only to find the supply, which had been nearly exhausted for months, was not even enough to provide water pressure in the hose. Unchecked, the flames quickly spread across the downtown of Franklin. The rapid spread of the conflagration combined with inadequate water supply protection resulted in a blaze fierce enough that the town was reduced to using dynamite to check its advance. By the morning, as the Associated Press put it, the town was "all but eliminated from the map".

William "Bill" McCoy, Jr., who began in 1952 as manager of the paper, took over the paper fully after his father's death from stroke in 1965. Bill McCoy died in 2008, at 87, after a long tenure as the paper's publisher. The paper was operated by Bill's son, John McCoy, until 2022, when it was sold to Mountain Media, LLC.

== See also ==
- List of newspapers in West Virginia
