= Pineville Independent Herald =

Weekly newspaper in Pineville, West Virginia, United States

Independent Herald
- Type: Weekly newspaper
- Owner(s): Mule Train Media, Inc
- Founded: 1912
- Ceased publication: March 14th, 2023
- Headquarters: 127 Main Ave., Pineville, WV 24874
- Circulation: 434
- Website: independentherald.com

The Independent Herald was a newspaper that served Pineville, West Virginia, and surrounding Wyoming County. It was discontinued on March 14, 2023 and their website domain was put up for sale.

Published weekly, it had a 2018 paid circulation of 434 and was considered a paper of public record by the State of West Virginia. It was owned by Mule Train Media, Inc and was a member of the West Virginia Press Association.

== History ==
The paper has existed under the current name since 1912, but traces its roots back to 1899.

From 1933 to 1944 it was owned and operated by Jack Shipman, who sold it to local businessman Robert Bailey in January 1964. In 1967, it was sold to Charles and Gerald Cline, with Charles Cline taking control of the paper. Charles Cline had grown up in the area, but had worked in New York City for a decade before returning to purchase and run the paper. While running the paper he served for a time as the executive secretary of the West Virginia Press Association, and served two terms in the West Virginia legislature.

In June 2017, the paper was sold to HD Media by Civitas Media in a multi-paper deal.

In April 2020, the paper was acquired by Mule Train Media, Inc.

== See also ==
- List of newspapers in West Virginia
