= Jackson Herald =

- Type: Weekly newspaper
- Owner(s): NCWV Media
- Editor: Roger Adkins
- Founded: 1876
- Headquarters: 410 Race Street, Ravenswood, Jackson County, WV 26164
- Circulation: 4,900 (as of 2016)
- Website: jacksonnewspapers.com

The Jackson Herald is a paper in Ripley, West Virginia. It is owned by Gatehouse Media, with a print circulation of about 4,900.

== History ==
Established in 1876, the Jackson Herald began as a Republican weekly.

In 1897, the paper, under editor Henry Deem, covered the last public execution in the state of West Virginia, the Ripley hanging of John Morgan. In addition to eyewitness accounts and local commentary, the paper published the extensive coverage of the hanging written by special representative of the New York Sun sent down to observe it. Deem said that it was "an extremely extravagant exaggeration of weird wonders but left out none of the details." The story outlined a scene sensational and embarrassing enough that the state legislature passed a bill prohibiting public executions, one of the earlier bans in the South. Deem died in May 1915.

Sattis Simmons took the editorship of the paper in 1922. The paper would remain connected with the Simmons family until 1995. In 1995, the Herald was bought from the Simmons family by the group owning the Jackson Star. The paper was folded into a holding company called Jackson Newspapers, but continued to publish as a separate entity. In 2022, Gannett sold the newspaper to NCWV Media.

== Resources ==
- List of newspapers in West Virginia
