= Moorefield Examiner =

- Type: Weekly newspaper
- Format: Broadsheet
- Owner(s): Mountain Media, LLC
- Founded: 1874
- Headquarters: 132 S Main St, Moorefield, Hardy County, WV 26836
- Circulation: 3,818
- ISSN: 0740-2651
- OCLC number: 9921953
- Website: moorefieldexaminer.com

The Moorefield Examiner is an American weekly newspaper serving Hardy County, West Virginia. It is owned by Mountain Media, LLC and has a circulation of 3,818.

== History ==
While claiming antecedents dating back to 1845, the Examiner itself was founded in 1874 by Samuel D. Gordon. It quickly became the leading democratic newspaper in the South Branch Valley, and was in those early years the only newspaper published in Hardy county.

Sam McCoy's son-in-law, Ralph E. Fisher, took over the paper in 1935 after Sam's death, with Sam's wife Eunice as co-publisher. For five years it was run as a co-op while Fisher was on active duty in the Navy. Fisher died of a heart attack, at age 62, in 1968. His daughter, Phoebe F. Heishman took over as editor and publisher, and was later joined by her husband David, and their children James and Hannah. The Heishman's owned the paper as the R.E. Fisher Company, Inc. until it was sold to Mountain Media, LLC in 2024.

== Related Pages ==
- List of newspapers in West Virginia
