= The Putnam Standard =

- Type: Weekly newspaper, Defunct
- Format: Tabloid (newspaper format)
- Owner(s): Stadelman Publishing, LLC
- Publisher: Chris Stadelman
- Founded: 1877
- Ceased publication: 2015
- Headquarters: 3845 Teays Valley Road; Hurricane, West Virginia 25526; United States
- Price: 50 cents
- Sister newspapers: The Cabell Standard
- OCLC number: 14903027
- Website: theputnamstandard.com

The Putnam Standard was an independent, weekly newspaper covering Putnam County, West Virginia. The paper was first printed in 1877 in Winfield, West Virginia by J.G. Downtain. Until 2006, the paper was published as "The Putnam Democrat."

The paper published its last issue on April 2, 2015 after going out of business Before that, the paper was published every Thursday by Stadelman Publishing, which purchased the paper in 2013.
