= The Intelligencer and Wheeling News-Register =

Combined daily newspapers in Wheeling, West Virginia

The Intelligencer Wheeling News-Register
- Type: Daily newspaper
- Owner: Ogden Newspapers
- Publisher: Perry Nardo
- Editor: John McCabe
- Managing editor: John McCabe
- Founded: 1852
- Language: English
- Headquarters: 1500 Main Street; Wheeling, West Virginia, U.S.
- Circulation: 34,911
- Website: theintelligencer.net

The Intelligencer and Wheeling News-Register are combined daily newspapers under common ownership in Wheeling, West Virginia, and are the flagship publications of Ogden Newspapers. The Intelligencer is published weekday mornings and Saturdays, while the News-Register is published weekday afternoons and Sundays.

== The Intelligencer ==
Founded as the Wheeling Intelligencer in August 1852 by Eli B. Swearingen and Oliver Taylor, The Intelligencer is the oldest continuously published daily newspaper in the state of West Virginia. The paper was initially established as a means to promote Winfield Scott and the Whig Party in the 1852 United States presidential election.

== See also ==
- List of newspapers in West Virginia
