= Berzy-le-Sec =

- Part of Bernoy-le-Château
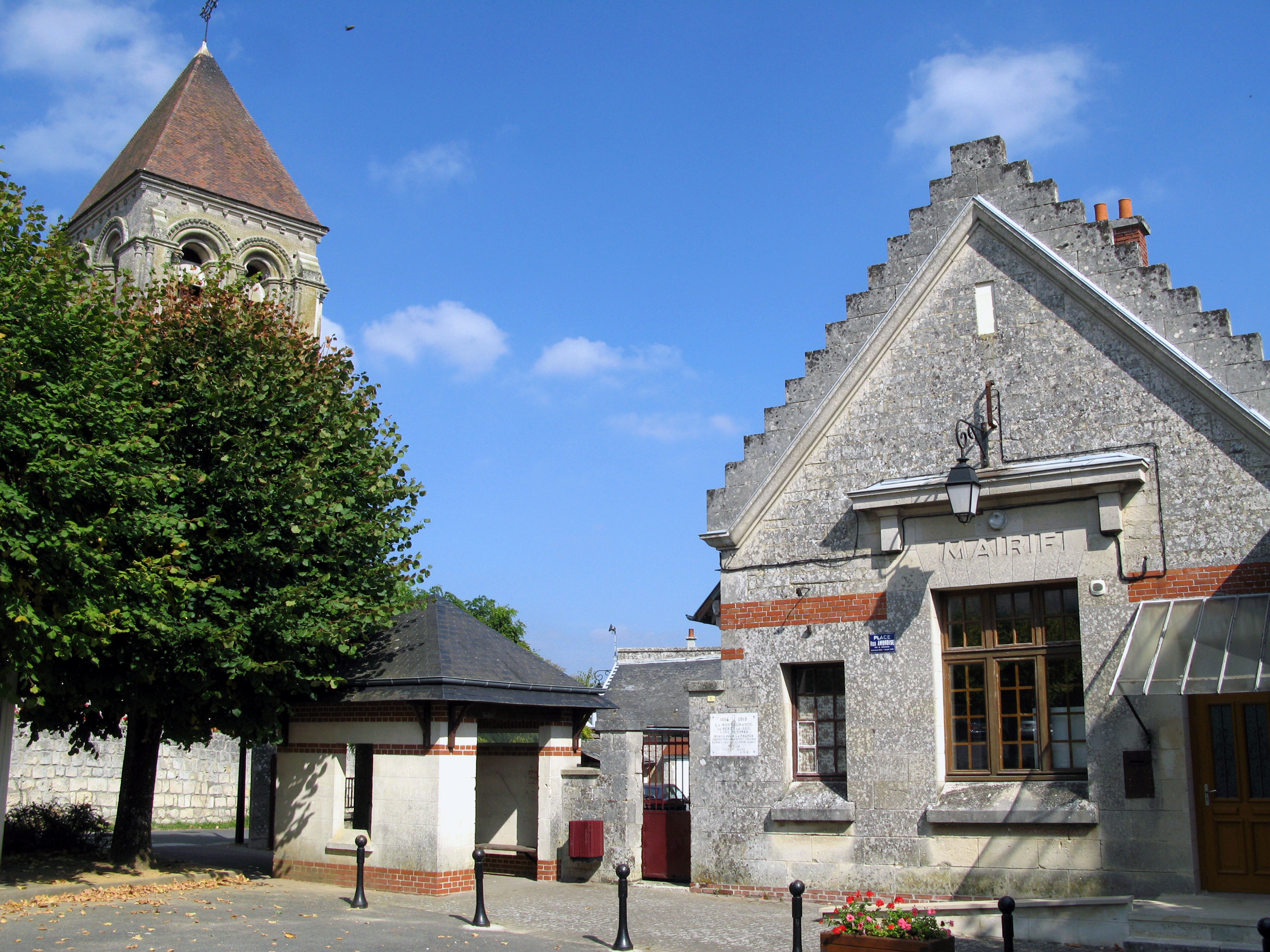
- Town hall and church
- Location of Berzy-le-Sec
- Location within France Location within Hauts-de-France
- Coordinates: 49°20′05″N 3°18′49″E
- Country: France
- Region: Hauts-de-France
- Department: Aisne
- Arrondissement: Soissons
- Canton: Soissons-2
- Commune: Bernoy-le-Château
- Area^{1}: 11.69 km^{2} (4.51 sq mi)
- Elevation: 133 m (436 ft)
- Highest elevation: 154 m (505 ft)
- Lowest elevation: 52 m (171 ft)
- Population (2021): 373
  - Density: 31.9/km^{2} (82.6/sq mi)
- Time zone: UTC+01:00 (CET)
  - Summer (DST): UTC+02:00 (CEST)
- Postal code: 02200
- ^{1} French Land Register data, which excludes lakes, ponds, glaciers > 1 km^{2} (0.386 sq mi or 247 acres) and river estuaries.

Berzy-le-Sec (French pronunciation: [bɛʁzi lə sɛk]) is a former commune in the department of Aisne in Hauts-de-France in northern France. On 1 January 2023, it was merged into the new commune of Bernoy-le-Château.

== See also ==
- Communes of the Aisne department
