= Moundsville, West Virginia =

City in West Virginia, US

- City
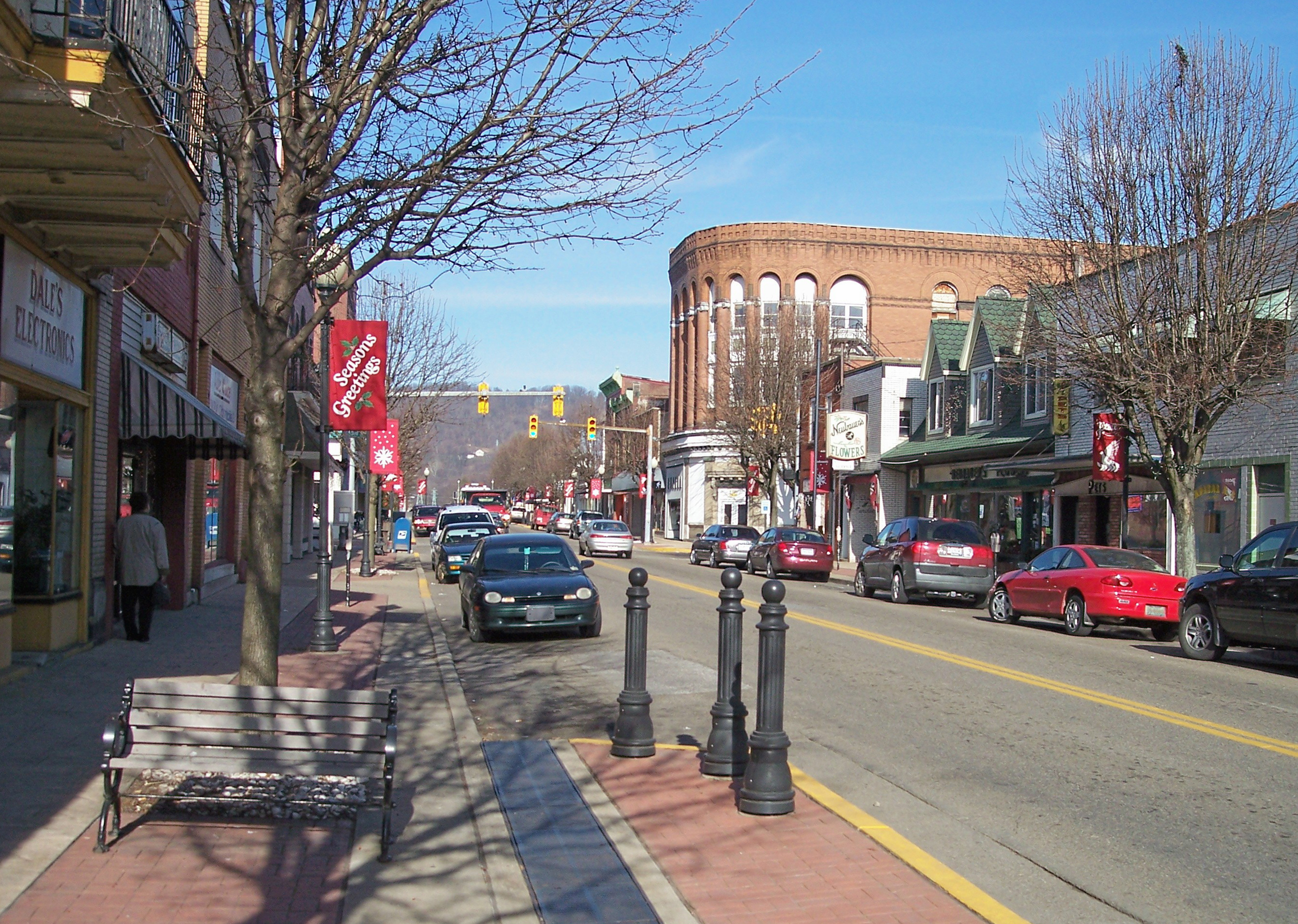
- Jefferson Avenue in downtown Moundsville

- Flag Seal
- Interactive map of Moundsville, West Virginia
- Location within West Virginia Location within the United States
- Coordinates: 39°55′N 80°44′W
- Country: United States
- State: West Virginia
- County: Marshall
- Chartered: 1832

Government
  - Type: Council-Manager
  - Mayor: Randy Chamberlain
  - City Manager: Richard Healy

Area
  - Total: 3.36 sq mi (8.70 km^{2})
  - Land: 2.91 sq mi (7.53 km^{2})
  - Water: 0.45 sq mi (1.17 km^{2})
- Elevation: 696 ft (212 m)

Population (2020)
  - Total: 8,093
  - Estimate (2021): 7,981
  - Density: 2,780/sq mi (1,070/km^{2})
- Time zone: UTC-5 (Eastern (EST))
  - Summer (DST): UTC-4 (EDT)
- ZIP code: 26041
- Area code: 304
- FIPS code: 54-56020
- GNIS feature ID: 1543607
- Website: www.cityofmoundsville.com

Moundsville is a city in and the county seat of Marshall County, West Virginia, United States, along the Ohio River. The population was 8,122 at the 2020 census. It is part of the Wheeling metropolitan area. The city was named for the nearby ancient Grave Creek Mound, constructed 250 to 100 BC by indigenous people of the Adena culture.

== History ==
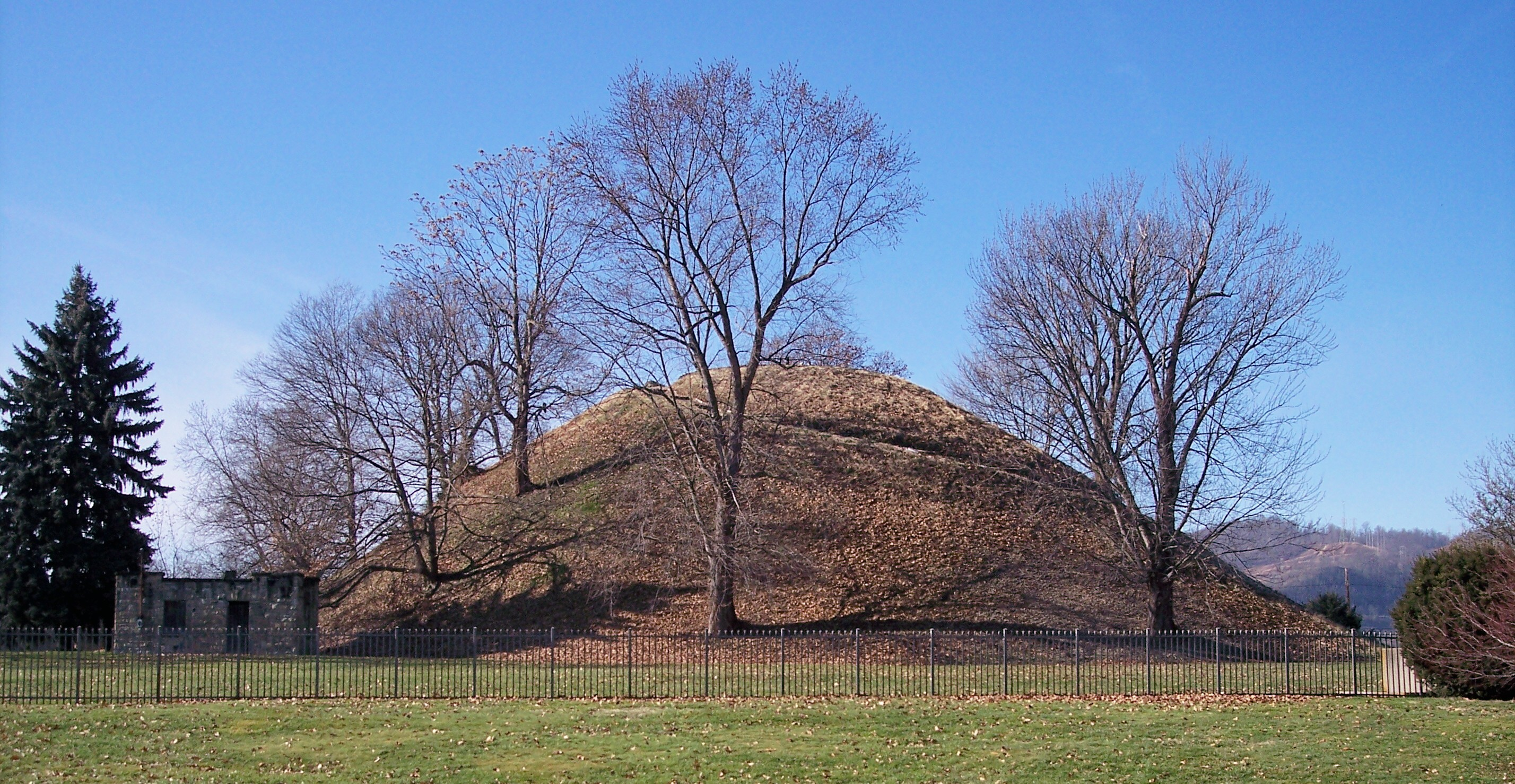
Grave Creek Mound

In 1771, English colonists Samuel and James Tomlinson built a cabin at what later became Moundsville, although they did not overwinter; in fact, they left for several years after attacks by Native Americans. Elizabethtown, as Tomlinson's community was called, was incorporated in 1830 and would become the county seat upon the creation of Marshall County in 1835. Nearby, the town of Mound City was incorporated in 1832. The two towns combined in 1865.

In 1852, a line of the Baltimore and Ohio Railroad opened, connecting the eastern rail network with the Ohio and Mississippi riverboat system; Moundsville was an important port until 1861, when the Civil War shut down the river system and caused major damage to the railroad.

The Fostoria Glass Company (specializing in hand-blown glass objects) was headquartered in Moundsville from 1891 to 1986. Today, Moundsville is home to the Fostoria Glass Museum.

The retired West Virginia State Penitentiary operated in Moundsville from 1867 to 1995.

On August 4, 1927, Charles Lindbergh landed The Spirit of St. Louis at Langin Field in Moundsville.

== Geography ==
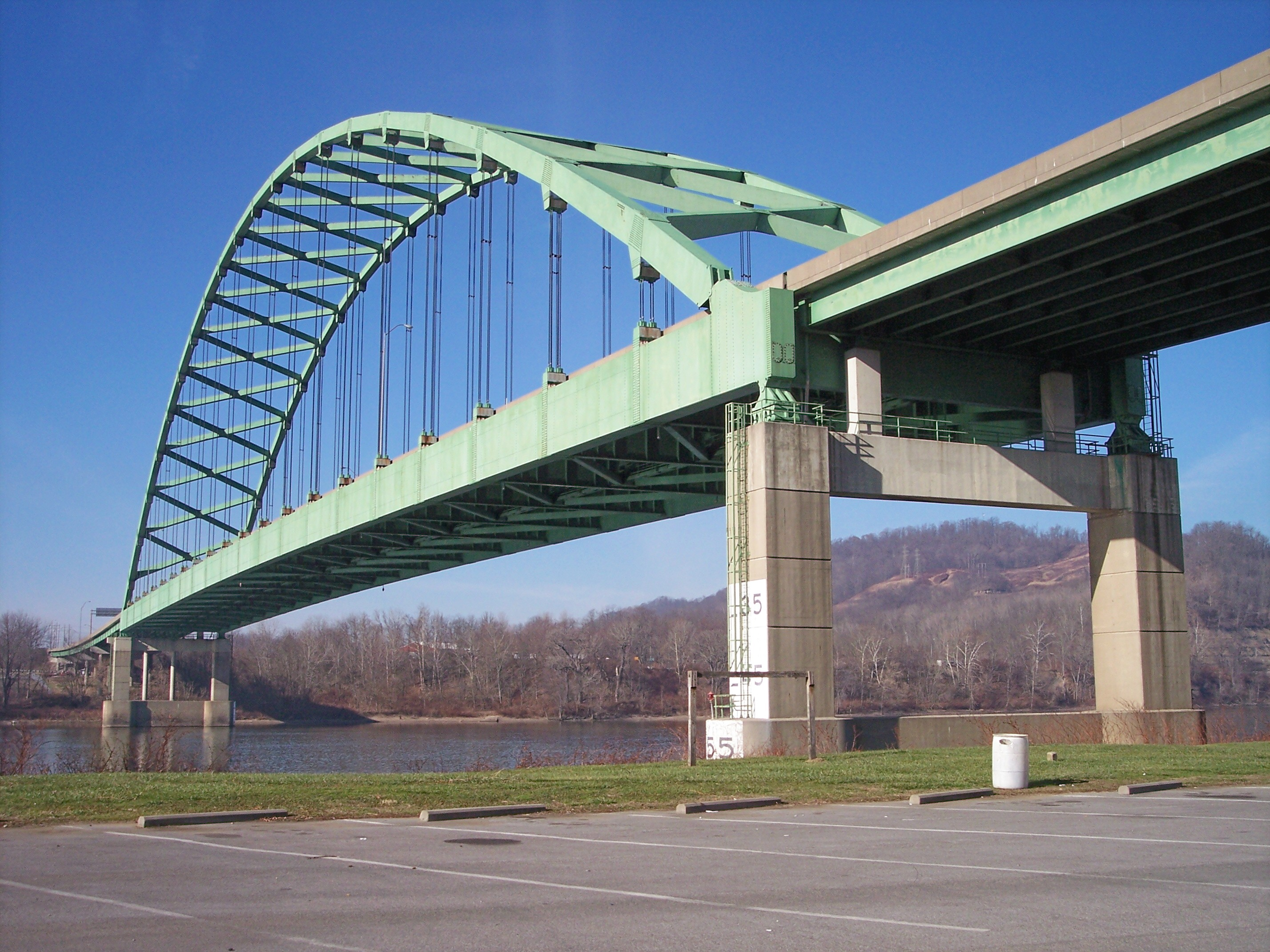
Moundsville Bridge

According to the United States Census Bureau, the city has a total area of 3.36 square miles (8.70 km^{2}), of which 2.91 square miles (7.54 km^{2}) is land and 0.45 square miles (1.17 km^{2}) is water.

=== Climate ===
The climate in this area is characterized by relatively high temperatures and evenly distributed precipitation throughout the year. According to the Köppen climate classification system, Moundsville has a humid subtropical climate, abbreviated "Cfa" on climate maps.

Climate data for Moundsville, West Virginia (1991–2020 normals, extremes 1963–present)
Month	Jan	Feb	Mar	Apr	May	Jun	Jul	Aug	Sep	Oct	Nov	Dec	Year
Record high °F (°C)	74 (23)	80 (27)	86 (30)	92 (33)	94 (34)	101 (38)	105 (41)	102 (39)	97 (36)	93 (34)	82 (28)	78 (26)	105 (41)
Mean maximum °F (°C)	64.0 (17.8)	66.2 (19.0)	75.4 (24.1)	84.4 (29.1)	88.7 (31.5)	92.8 (33.8)	94.6 (34.8)	93.2 (34.0)	90.9 (32.7)	82.8 (28.2)	74.5 (23.6)	64.2 (17.9)	95.7 (35.4)
Mean daily maximum °F (°C)	39.3 (4.1)	42.7 (5.9)	52.1 (11.2)	65.1 (18.4)	74.5 (23.6)	82.2 (27.9)	85.8 (29.9)	84.6 (29.2)	78.5 (25.8)	66.7 (19.3)	54.2 (12.3)	43.6 (6.4)	64.1 (17.8)
Daily mean °F (°C)	29.5 (−1.4)	32.0 (0.0)	40.4 (4.7)	51.5 (10.8)	61.7 (16.5)	69.9 (21.1)	73.8 (23.2)	72.6 (22.6)	65.9 (18.8)	54.2 (12.3)	42.8 (6.0)	34.3 (1.3)	52.4 (11.3)
Mean daily minimum °F (°C)	19.7 (−6.8)	21.4 (−5.9)	28.6 (−1.9)	38.0 (3.3)	48.9 (9.4)	57.5 (14.2)	61.9 (16.6)	60.5 (15.8)	53.3 (11.8)	41.6 (5.3)	31.4 (−0.3)	25.0 (−3.9)	40.6 (4.8)
Mean minimum °F (°C)	1.7 (−16.8)	6.1 (−14.4)	14.8 (−9.6)	26.8 (−2.9)	36.8 (2.7)	47.1 (8.4)	53.7 (12.1)	52.9 (11.6)	43.2 (6.2)	31.0 (−0.6)	20.6 (−6.3)	11.6 (−11.3)	−1.3 (−18.5)
Record low °F (°C)	−20 (−29)	−15 (−26)	−3 (−19)	11 (−12)	25 (−4)	36 (2)	44 (7)	40 (4)	31 (−1)	18 (−8)	6 (−14)	−11 (−24)	−20 (−29)
Average precipitation inches (mm)	3.77 (96)	3.13 (80)	3.87 (98)	3.68 (93)	4.47 (114)	4.89 (124)	4.52 (115)	3.82 (97)	3.88 (99)	3.23 (82)	3.15 (80)	3.72 (94)	46.13 (1,172)
Average snowfall inches (cm)	6.0 (15)	4.7 (12)	2.4 (6.1)	0.1 (0.25)	0.0 (0.0)	0.0 (0.0)	0.0 (0.0)	0.0 (0.0)	0.0 (0.0)	0.0 (0.0)	0.1 (0.25)	2.5 (6.4)	15.8 (40)
Average precipitation days (≥ 0.01 in)	14.2	11.7	12.3	14.0	14.1	12.5	11.1	10.2	9.6	10.4	10.9	13.2	144.2
Average snowy days (≥ 0.1 in)	4.1	3.1	1.0	0.1	0.0	0.0	0.0	0.0	0.0	0.0	0.1	2.4	10.8
Source: NOAA

== Demographics ==
Historical population
Census	Pop.	Note	%±
1850	445		—
1860	515		15.7%
1870	1,500		191.3%
1880	1,774		18.3%
1890	2,688		51.5%
1900	5,362		99.5%
1910	8,918		66.3%
1920	10,669		19.6%
1930	14,411		35.1%
1940	14,168		−1.7%
1950	14,772		4.3%
1960	15,163		2.6%
1970	13,560		−10.6%
1980	12,419		−8.4%
1990	10,753		−13.4%
2000	9,998		−7.0%
2010	9,318		−6.8%
2020	8,093		−13.1%
2021 (est.)	7,981		−1.4%
U.S. Decennial Census; 2014 Estimate

=== 2020 census ===
As of the 2020 census, Moundsville had a population of 8,093. The median age was 48.1 years. 18.5% of residents were under the age of 18 and 25.7% of residents were 65 years of age or older. For every 100 females there were 87.5 males, and for every 100 females age 18 and over there were 85.8 males age 18 and over.

99.6% of residents lived in urban areas, while 0.4% lived in rural areas.

There were 3,694 households in Moundsville, of which 22.5% had children under the age of 18 living in them. Of all households, 37.2% were married-couple households, 19.8% were households with a male householder and no spouse or partner present, and 35.7% were households with a female householder and no spouse or partner present. About 38.2% of all households were made up of individuals and 20.3% had someone living alone who was 65 years of age or older.

There were 4,263 housing units, of which 13.3% were vacant. The homeowner vacancy rate was 3.4% and the rental vacancy rate was 15.9%.

Racial composition as of the 2020 census
Race	Number	Percent
White	7,622	94.2%
Black or African American	48	0.6%
American Indian and Alaska Native	7	0.1%
Asian	35	0.4%
Native Hawaiian and Other Pacific Islander	2	0.0%
Some other race	23	0.3%
Two or more races	356	4.4%
Hispanic or Latino (of any race)	117	1.4%

=== 2010 census ===
As of the 2010 census, there were 9,318 people, 4,016 households, and 2,445 families living in the city. The population density was 3,202.1 inhabitants per square mile (1,236.3/km^{2}). There were 4,458 housing units at an average density of 1,532.0 units per square mile (591.5 units/km^{2}). The racial makeup of the city was 97.5% White, 0.8% African American, 0.2% Native American, 0.4% Asian, 0.2% from other races, and 0.9% from two or more races. Hispanic or Latino of any race were 1.1% of the population.

There were 4,016 households, of which 25.4% had children under the age of 18 living with them, 41.2% were married couples living together, 14.5% had a female householder with no husband present, 5.1% had a male householder with no wife present, and 39.1% were non-families. 33.7% of all households were made up of individuals, and 16.4% had someone living alone who was 65 years of age or older. The average household size was 2.21 and the average family size was 2.79.

The median age in the city was 45.2 years. 19.4% of residents were under the age of 18; 7.1% were between the ages of 18 and 24; 23.2% were from 25 to 44; 30.1% were from 45 to 64; and 20.1% were 65 years of age or older. The gender makeup of the city was 47.9% male and 52.1% female.

=== 2000 census ===
As of the 2000 census, there were 9,998 people, 4,122 households, and 2,662 families living in the city. The population density was 3,399.0 people per square mile (1,312.4 people/km^{2}). There were 4,461 housing units at an average density of 1,516.6 units per square mile (585.6 units/km^{2}). The racial makeup of the city was 98.13% White, 0.73% African American, 0.13% Native American, 0.30% Asian, 0.01% Pacific Islander, 0.10% from other races, and 0.60% from two or more races. Hispanic or Latino of any race were 1.16% of the population.

There were 4,122 households, out of which 25.5% had children under the age of 18 living with them, 47.7% were married couples living together, 13.3% had a female householder with no husband present, and 35.4% were non-families. 31.4% of all households were made up of individuals, and 17.0% had someone living alone who was 65 years of age or older. The average household size was 2.28 and the average family size was 2.84.

In the city, the population was spread out, with 20.4% under the age of 18, 7.8% from 18 to 24, 26.8% from 25 to 44, 24.9% from 45 to 64, and 20.0% who were 65 years of age or older. The median age was 42 years. For every 100 females, there were 92.3 males. For every 100 females age 18 and over, there were 89.0 males.

The median income for a household in the city was $23,107, and the median income for a family was $30,534. Males had a median income of $26,242 versus $19,348 for females. The per capita income for the city was $13,997. About 18.1% of families and 22.4% of the population were below the poverty line, including 33.2% of those under age 18 and 15.5% of those age 65 or over.

== Notable people ==
- Edward L. Athey, sports coach at Washington College.
- Frank De Vol, film and television music composer and actor
- Virginia B. Evans, painter, glass artist, and teacher
- Joseph W. Gallaher, businessman and politician
- Davis Grubb, novelist and story writer
- Kristin Lewicki, professional ice hockey player
- Adrian Melott, astrophysicist and astrobiologist
- Arch A. Moore Jr., former Governor of West Virginia
- Ed Pastilong, football player, coach, and college athletics administrator, WVU's Director of Athletics for 21 years
- Ralph Tasker, coach of twelve New Mexico Boys' State Basketball Championships for Hobbs High School, West Virginia Sports Hall of Fame
- Ted Valentine, NCAA men's basketball referee and 2005 Naismith College Official of the Year.

== Media ==
- Moundsville Echo

== In popular culture ==
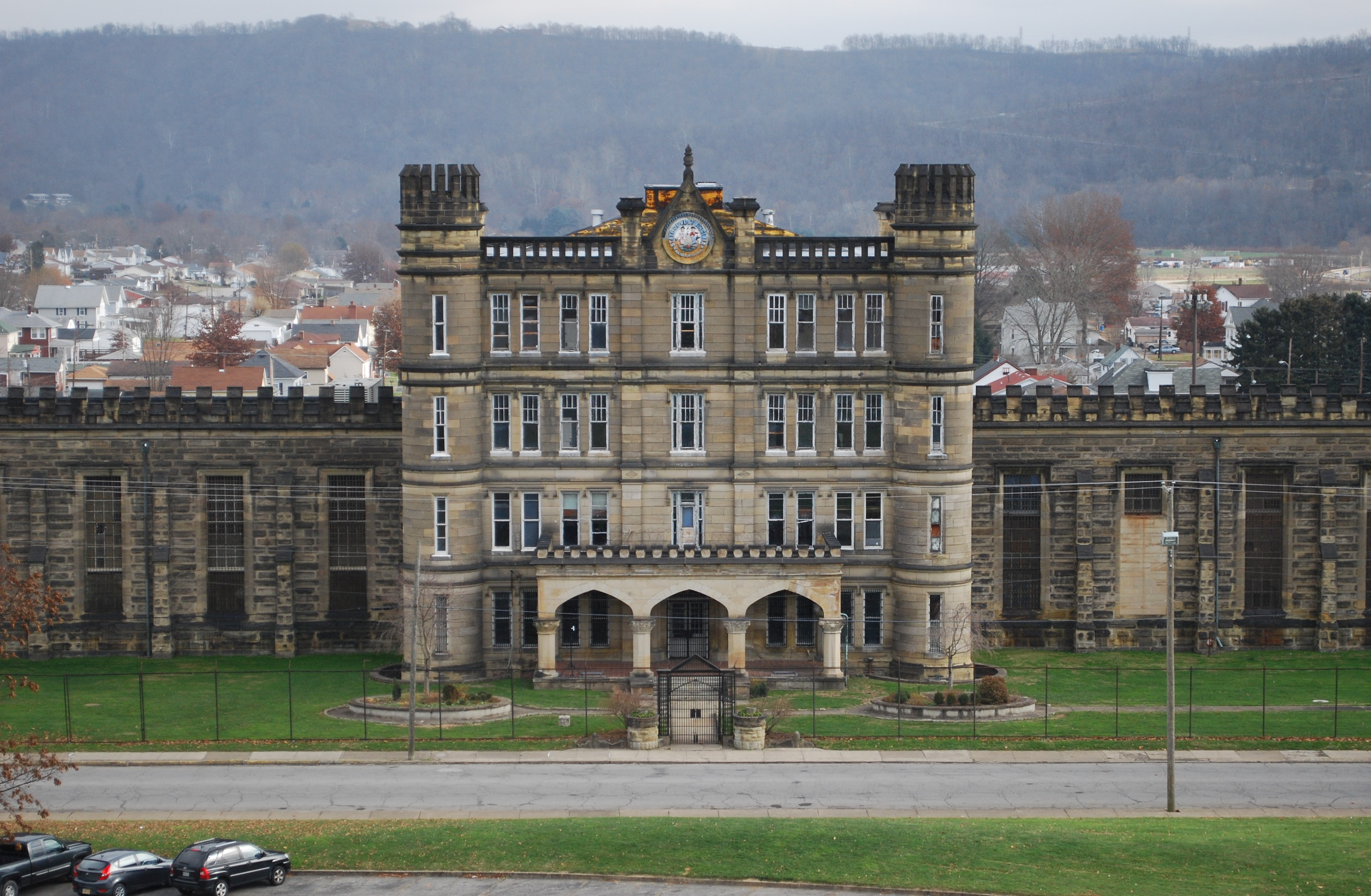
West Virginia State Penitentiary

In 2018, documentary filmmakers David Bernabo and John W. Miller released Moundsville, a documentary about the history of Moundsville.

“You Missed My Heart”, a song by Mark Kozelek of Sun Kil Moon and Jimmy LaValle, references a prison cemetery in Moundsville. This song has also been covered by Phoebe Bridgers.
