= Fayette Tribune =

Newspaper in Oak Hill, West Virginia

- Type: Weekly newspaper
- Owner: CNHI
- Founded: 1915
- Headquarters: 417 Main Street, Oak Hill, WV 25901
- Circulation: 1,093 (as of 2016)
- Website: fayettetribune.com

The Fayette Tribune is a newspaper serving Oak Hill, West Virginia, and surrounding Fayette County. Published on Thursday, it has a circulation of 1,093 and is owned by Community Newspaper Holdings.

== History ==
In 1915, Charles A. Goddard acquired the Fayette Tribune and Free Press, a name simplified to the Fayette Tribune in 1924. In 1930 the Tribune was sold to the Woodyard brothers, who also purchased the Fayette Democrat.

The Fayette Tribune was the first newspaper to call attention to the Hawk's Nest Tunnel disaster, a large scale incident of occupational silicosis, considered to be one of the worst industrial tragedies in the history of the United States. Reporting in February 1931 the paper broke the story:

"Their [sic] is a great deal of comment regarding the unusually large number of deaths among the colored laborers in the tunnel works. The deaths totaled about 37 in the past two weeks."

The mining continued, however, resulting in an estimated 476 deaths before construction halted.

In 2022, The Montgomery Herald was merged into the Fayette Tribune.

== See also ==
- List of newspapers in West Virginia
