= The Cabell Standard =

American newspaper

- Type: Weekly newspaper, Defunct
- Format: Tabloid (newspaper format)
- Owner(s): Stadelman Publishing, LLC
- Publisher: Chris Stadelman
- Founded: 1898
- Headquarters: 3845 Teays Valley Road; Hurricane, West Virginia 25526; United States
- Price: 50 cents
- Sister newspapers: The Putnam Standard
- OCLC number: 12768309
- Website: thecabellstandard.com

The Cabell Standard was an independent, weekly newspaper covering Cabell County, West Virginia. The paper was first printed in 1898 in Milton, West Virginia, by James R. Dudley. Until 2006, the paper was published as "The Cabell Record."

The paper published its last issue on April 2, 2015, after going out of business. Before that, the paper was published every Thursday by Stadelman Publishing, which purchased the paper in 2013.
