= Braxton Citizens' News =

- Type: Weekly newspaper
- Founder(s): Edward R. Given
- Founded: 1976
- Language: English
- Headquarters: Sutton, West Virginia, USA
- Circulation: 5,718 (as of 2016)
- Website: bcn-news.com

The Braxton Citizens' News is a weekly newspaper serving the Sutton, West Virginia area in the United States. It is published each Friday.

== History ==
The Braxton Citizens' News began in 1976 under publisher Edward R. Given. Given, a former advertising manager for the Braxton Democrat, founded the paper to focus more on school and sports news. Given has served as a director of the West Virginia Press Association. Given also served as mayor of Sutton in the 1990s; he shared a similar name with his successor, Edgar G. Given.

The offices of the Braxton Democrat-Central were gutted by a fire in 2006. Under Given's leadership, the Citizens' News offered extensive aid to the rival paper, to help ensure they could continue publishing. Given and Democrat-Central publisher Craig Smith have an enduring personal and professional friendship, and have served as sources for one another's sources.

Given won the top state press award for an individual journalist in 2013, being named the "Adam R. Kelly Premier Journalist of the Year."

In 2015, the Citizens' News became the first affiliate to join the WVJobFinder web site launched by Charleston Newspapers, and expressed excitement about the prospect of statewide job recruitment through the site.
