= 1960 United States presidential election in the District of Columbia =

While the District of Columbia lacked any electoral votes in the 1960 presidential general election, it did hold primaries and sent delegations to both major party conventions.

This was the last presidential election in which the District of Columbia lacked any electoral votes.

== Primaries ==
=== Democratic primary ===
Among the reasons for which John F. Kennedy opted against competing in the D.C. primary was that he believed that Hubert Humphrey, a civil rights stalwart, would have a strong advantage with the district's predominantly African American electorate. Kennedy also viewed the District's primary as too inconsequential to allot resources to, as it had very few delegates to offer.

Humphrey was challenged by Wayne Morse of Oregon, who saw the D.C. primary as a warm-up for the Oregon primary to be held later that month.

District of Columbia Democratic Presidential Primary Results – 1960
Party	Candidate	Votes	Percentage
Democratic	Hubert Humphrey	8,239	57.4%
Democratic	Wayne Morse	6,127	42.6%
Totals		14,366	100.00%

=== Republican primary ===
No candidates ran in the Republican primary, resulting in all votes being awarded to unbound delegates.

District of Columbia Republican Presidential Primary Results – 1960
Party	Candidate	Votes	Percentage
Republican	Unpledged delegates	9,468	100%
Totals		9,468	100.00%
