= Parsons Advocate =

Newspaper in Parsons, West Virginia

- Type: Weekly newspaper
- Owner: Mountain Media
- Founded: 1896
- Headquarters: 219 Central Avenue, Parsons, WV 26287
- Circulation: 3,033
- Website: parsonsadvocate.com

The Parsons Advocate is a newspaper serving Parsons and surrounding Tucker County in the U.S. state of West Virginia. Published weekly, it has a circulation of 3,033 and is owned by Mountain Media.

The paper began life as the Parsons City Advocate, a Republican weekly founded in 1896. From 1896 to 1903, future governor William Gustavus Conley was a co-owner of the paper. The title was shortened to the Parsons Advocate in 1901.

In 1907, Parsons resident David Wallace Thurston became editor of the Advocate, and on July 1, 1913, he leased the plant and business, buying it in full in November 1919. Thurston, who cast his first presidential vote for Theodore Roosevelt in 1904, was heavily involved in the Republican party, holding many local administrative positions and running for mayor as the Republican nominee in 1932. The 1923 History of West Virginia referred to the Advocate as the "official paper" of Tucker County, and noted that under Thurston's leadership, its circulation was extended well beyond the county's borders.

== See also ==
- List of newspapers in West Virginia
