= The Exponent Telegram =

Daily broadsheet newspaper serving Clarksburg, West Virginia

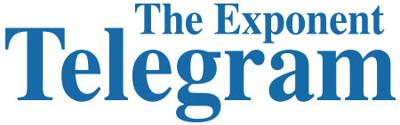
- Type: Daily newspaper
- Format: Broadsheet
- Publisher: NCWV Media
- Founded: 1927; 99 years ago
- Language: English
- City: Clarksburg, West Virginia
- Country: United States
- Circulation: 13,990 daily 17,790 Sunday (as of 2016)
- Website: wvnews.com/theet

The Exponent Telegram is a daily newspaper serving Clarksburg, West Virginia and the surrounding community. It has a daily print circulation of about 14,000, and a Sunday circulation of about 18,000.

== History ==
The Telegram was founded in 1861 as a weekly and went daily in 1902. The Exponent was founded as the News in 1910. It changed its name to The Exponent in 1920. The two papers came under common ownership and became daily morning and afternoon newspapers, respectively (with a combined Sunday edition), in 1927, Virgil L. Highland, one of the owners of The Telegram, was instrumental in the merger of the two under the Clarksburg Publishing Co., also formed in 1927.

The Telegram began as a Unionist Republican weekly The National Telegraph in 1861, founded by Robert Northcutt, but temporarily suspended after Northcott enlisted with the Union and was subsequently captured and held in Libby prison. After the end of the Civil War, Northcott continued publishing, and was described by Rowell's directory as one of the more influential and reliable West Virginia weeklies, "zealously support[ing] the Grant administration" and protective tariffs. National Telegraph, as a Unionist and Republican vehicle during the Civil War. By 1891, the Wheeling Intelligencer noted the paper had recently invested in new machinery, becoming one of the "largest and best printed" papers in West Virginia.

In 1891, a group of Clarksburg men purchased the Telegram from Northcott, and for over a decade helped grow the paper into one of the most prominent in central West Virginia. By 1902, the weekly Telegram's success induced its owners to purchase the local Clarksburg Daily Post, which became the Clarksburg Daily Telegram.

The Exponent launched in 1910. It advertised itself as receiving "five times more" telegraph news than competing papers.

In 1927 the papers merged, publishing the Democratic Clarksburg Exponent in the mornings, the Clarksburg Telegram in the evenings, and a non-partisan paper, the Exponent Telegram, on Sundays,

J. Cecil Jarvis, president of the company that publishes the Exponent Telegram died in 2007 as the result of a bicycle accident.

In 2012, Brian Jarvis purchased The Exponent Telegram, retaining then current Telegram publisher Andy Kniceley. Under Jarvis's ownership, the paper grew the digital audience to more than 300,000 unique users a month in 2016, and expanding the newsroom staff by five positions. It was later purchased by NCWV Media.

== Resources ==
- List of newspapers in West Virginia
