= The West Virginia Daily News =

Newspaper in Lewisburg, West Virginia

- Owner: Ecent Corporation
- Founded: August 1851, renamed in 1967
- Headquarters: 188 W Foster Street; Lewisburg, West Virginia 24901
- Circulation: 4,637 (as of 2016)
- OCLC number: 12789500
- Website: wvdn.com

The West Virginia Daily News is a newspaper in Lewisburg, West Virginia.

== History ==
The newspaper traces its roots to several weekly newspapers, including The Greenbrier Era (1851-1854), The Greenbrier Independent (1859-1980), The West Virginia News (1897-1967), The White Sulphur Sentinel (1910-1968) and The White Sulphur Springs Star (1962-1980). The current newspaper, The West Virginia Daily News was launched on January 1, 1967 in Ronceverte, WV. The Printing Press and offices were relocated to Lewisburg WV around 1972.

Published Monday through Friday, the newspaper covers local news and events in the Greenbrier Valley, West Virginia, spreading across Greenbrier and Monroe counties, and areas of Pocahontas County. Its partner paper, the West Virginian, is published on Wednesdays.
