= Battle of Soissons (1918) =

World War I battle in July 1918

- Part of the Second Battle of the Marne, Western Front of World War I
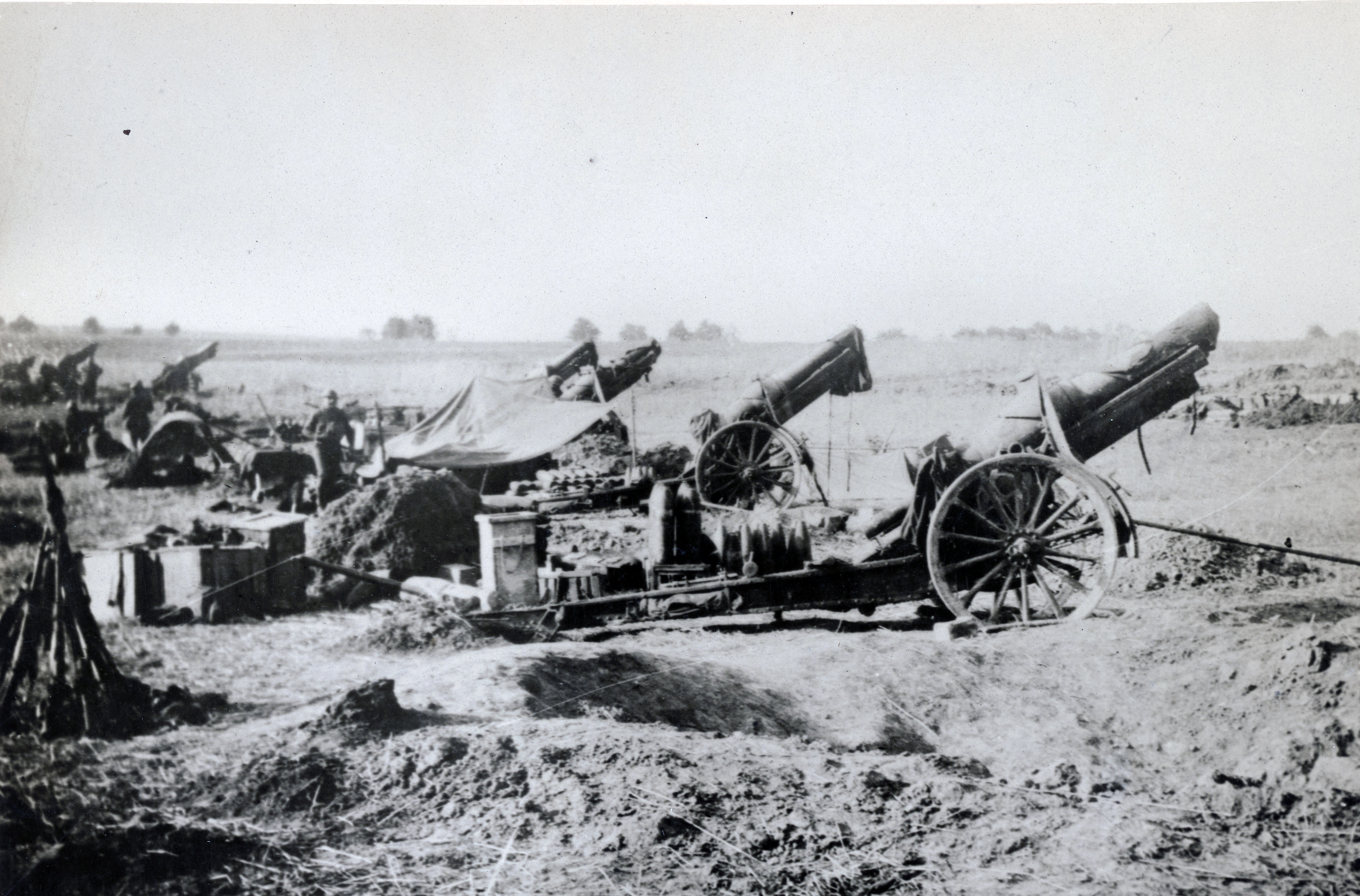
- American heavy artillery at Soissons, 1918
Date	18–22 July 1918
Location	Northeastern France 49°22′54″N 3°19′25″E
Result	Allied victory

Belligerents
France; United States; United Kingdom	German Empire

Commanders and leaders
(French Third Republic) Ferdinand Foch; (French Third Republic) Philippe Pétain; (French Third Republic) Émile Fayolle; (French Third Republic) Charles E. Mangin; (French Third Republic) Pierre Berdoulat; (French Third Republic) Albert Daugan; (United States) John J. Pershing; (United States) Robert L. Bullard; (United States) Charles P. Summerall; (United States) James G. Harbord	(German Empire) Erich Ludendorff; (German Empire) Crown Prince Wilhelm; (German Empire) Johannes von Eben; (German Empire) Wilhelm von Woyna; (German Empire) Hermann von Staabs; (German Empire) Oskar von Watter

Strength
At least 345,000 men, 478 tanks	At least 234,000 men, 210 aircraft

Casualties and losses
(French Third Republic) 95,000 casualties; (United Kingdom of Great Britain and Ireland) 13,000 casualties; (United States) 11,259 casualties	(German Empire) 168,000 casualties

The Battle of Soissons (1918) (also known as the Battle of the Soissonnais and of the Ourcq (French: Bataille du Soissoinais et de L'Ourcq) (Note: Le Soissonais is the area surrounding the city of Soissons. L'Ourcq is a river about 30 mi (48 km) to the south.)) was fought on the Western Front during World War I. Waged from 18 to 22 July 1918 between the French (with American and British assistance) and the German armies, the battle was part of the Allied response to the German offensive launched on 15 July, which had launched the Second Battle of the Marne.

The primary objective of the Allied attack was to cut both the Soissons – Château-Thierry road and the railroad running south from Soissons to Château-Thierry. As these were the main supply routes for the German forces in the Marne salient, cutting them would severely impair the Germans' ability to supply its armies defending it, forcing them to retreat and give up their gains.

This battle marked the turning point of the war as the Germans would be on the defensive for the remainder of the conflict.

== Background ==
The Russian withdrawal from the war after the Treaty of Brest-Litovsk on 3 March 1918 freed 42 German divisions which had been fighting on the Eastern Front, providing a temporary numeric advantage over the Allies on the Western Front. The Germans realized their only remaining chance for victory on the Western Front was to defeat the Allies before the United States could fully mobilize, equip, and deploy their large manpower reserves. Beginning on 21 March 1918 the Germans launched a series of attacks known as the 1918 Spring Offensive, or Kaiserschlacht (Kaiser’s Battle). By July 1918, the German Army had inflicted heavy losses on the British and French armies and seized large amounts of territory, but had sustained heavy losses of their own and failed to create the conditions for final victory.

The territory seized resulted in the Germans occupying two vast salients on the Western Front. One salient was in the British sector between Arras on the Scarpe River and La Fère on the Oise River. The second was in the French sector from just west of Reims in the east to Noyon in the west and south to Château-Thierry.

== Planning ==
On 14 June, after the American 1st Division took Cantigny, Foch wrote to General Philippe Pétain, commander of the Armies of the North and Northeast, “I have the honor to invite your attention to the importance of the communications net at Soissons, which is used for the supply of four German divisions on the front and which constitutes at the same time the sole junction point of all the railroads available to the enemy on the Aisne and south thereof.”

Foch's letter to Pétain eventually reached General Charles Emmanuel Mangin, commander of the French Tenth Army. Mangin replied on 20 June with a summary plan for offensive operations to seize the plateau southwest of Soissons. From here long-range guns could subject the bridges and railroad network to a methodical and intensive bombardment. He stressed the importance of possession of the ridge of Villers-Hélon stating “it is on the heights of Villers-Hélon, and not in the low ground at Longpont Brook, that the defense of the forest of Villers-Cotterêts should be conducted. That same day Mangin submitted a plan of action for an exploratory attack to take some high ground west of Soissons.

On 23 June, at a conference in Chaumont, Pershing reminded Foch of the discussion they had at Sarcus where he suggested a counterattack. Foch replied, “studies are being made,” but made no mention of when, where, or whether such an attack would be made. Mangin's exploratory attack was executed on 28 June. According to Mangin, it “tended to prove” the Germans would have difficulty defending their positions against a surprise attack without artillery preparation. Additionally it would offer the best chance of success for an attack on the plateaus southwest of Soissons.

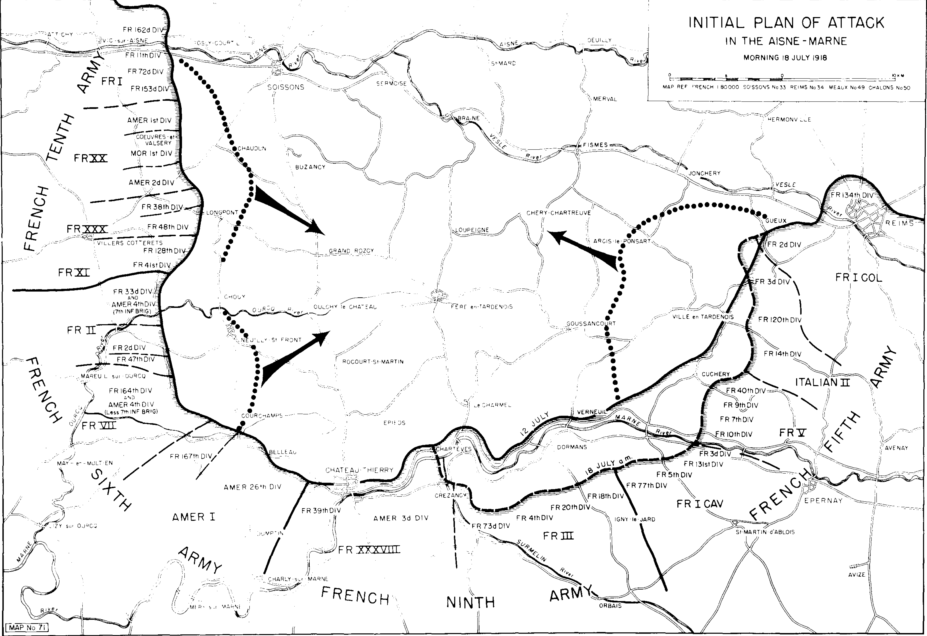
Allied plan of attack at Soissons for the morning of 18 July 1918

On 12 July, Pétain issued instruction No. 14546 to the generals of the Group of Armies of the Reserve and the Group of Armies of the Centre to make immediate preparations for an attack. He stated, "The minimum advantage gained should be to deprive the enemy of the use of the Soissons communication net." That same day Pétain issued instructions for an offensive whose purpose was to reduce the Marne salient. This would entail utilizing the French Tenth and Sixth Armies against the western flank of the salient, and the Fifth Army on the eastern flank. The French Tenth Army would carry out the main attack against the Soissons communication network. In support of the main attack, the French Sixth Army would attack south of the Ourcq River while the French Fifth Army would attack the eastern flank of the salient along both banks of the Ardre River with its right flank on the heights south of the Vesle River. At the very least the action of the French Fifth and Sixth Armies would result in preventing enemy reserves from moving against the main attack.

The following day Pétain stated the attack should be launched the morning of 18 July while stressing the necessity of secrecy. On 14 July both the American 1st Division and the American 2nd Division were transferred to the French Tenth Army XX Corps under General Pierre Emile Berdoulat.

On 15 July, the Germans launched the final attack of their Spring Offensive, opening what became the Second Battle of the Marne. General Max von Boehn, commander of the German Seventh Army, succeeded in getting seven divisions across the Marne. In response Pétain sent a message to General Émile Fayolle, commander of the Group of Armies of the Reserve, ordering him to “suspend the Mangin operation in order to enable me to send your reserves into the battle south of the Marne.” The message also ordered the return of the American 2nd Division artillery to the American 2nd Division. Within 2 1/2 hours Foch brusquely rescinded the suspension of the Mangin operation, declaring “there can be no question at all of slowing up and less so of stopping the Mangin preparations."

== Terrain ==
Looking east from the Forêt de Retz, one would see an almost tree barren rolling plateau with waist-high wheat fields. Trench systems, the hallmark of First World War battlefields, were non-existent on this stretch of the front. The final objective, the road and rail network running south from Soissons in the Crise River valley, was about 7.5 mi (12 km) to the east and was hidden from view because of the sloping terrain.

Cutting across the plateau were a series of four deep, swampy, formidable ravines; Missy, Ploisy, Chazelle-Lechelle, and Vierzy. Villages, consisting of buildings constructed of sturdy stone masonry, were within and near the edges of these ravines. Substantial caves had been carved out to quarry the stone for the villages.

There were two main roads which stood between the final objective and the jump off point. The Soissons – Château-Thierry road ran due south, almost perpendicular, to the line of attack. The Soissons–Paris road ran southwest far from the American 1st Division jump-off point but crossing the American 2nd Division right at the jump-off point. These roadways were the principal lines of communication for the German troops in the Marne salient.

The railroad ran south from Soissons in the Crise River valley paralleling the Soissons – Château-Thierry road. At Noyant-et-Aconin it split with one branch turning southwest to Paris in the 2nd Division zone of attack. A second branch continued south through Oulchy-le-Château to Château-Thierry and also served as a principal line of communication.

The first major obstacle for the 1st Division was Missy Ravine, directly in the path of 2nd Brigade. This would allow 1st Brigade to make quicker progress until it had to contend with Chazelle Ravine 2.5 mi (4.0 km) further east. The 2nd Brigade would then have to deal with Ploisy Ravine 1.7 mi (2.7 km) beyond Missy Ravine. The 2nd Division would have to struggle with two arms of Vierzy Ravine, one of which cut completely across their sector. This meant that both the 1st and 2nd Divisions would have to contend with at least one ravine before the Moroccan 1st Division encountered the Chazelle-Léchelle Ravine.

== Preparation ==
Foch's desire was to achieve surprise of time and place. In order to achieve this, unusual precautions were taken limiting all information regarding the attack to the high command. On 14 July Fayolle issued a memorandum ordering the entire Group of Armies of the Reserve not to trust anyone not personally known to be reliable, move only at night, light no fires, and to report anything and anyone suspicious. In order to confuse the Germans as to his intentions Mangin chose to keep his artillery far back from the German forward areas in what the Germans considered a defensive posture: within range of the German front lines but unable to slow the arrival of enemy replacements or reinforcements. In order to keep the Germans off guard Mangin planned to have the two American divisions rush forward to the front just before the hour of attack.

The 1st and 2nd Divisions were in need of replacements after their engagements at Cantigny and Château-Thierry – Belleau Wood, respectively. Both divisions were brought to full strength with men from the 41st Division in early July. On 12 July, less than six days before the start of the attack, both the 1st and 2nd Divisions were assigned to the newly formed American III Corps which was attached to the French Sixth Army in the same order. Fayolle's Chief of Staff, General Gabriel Alexandre Paquette, sent a telegram two days later attaching both divisions to Mangin's Tenth Army.

At 11 am on 16 July, Fayolle sent a telegram to the French General Headquarters stating that Mangin recommended there be no preparatory barrage prior to the attack of the French Tenth Army so as to achieve complete surprise. The telegram further recommended the attack begin at 4:35 am behind a rolling barrage. The French Sixth Army, just to the south, would require a preparation barrage lasting one half hour. Fayolle left the start time of the barrage to General Jean Marie Degoutte, commander of the French Sixth Army, with the caveat the barrage not precede the French Tenth Army jump-off. At noon on 17 July 1918, Pétain approved Fayolle's recommendations and set 18 July 1918 as the attack date.

=== 1st Division ===
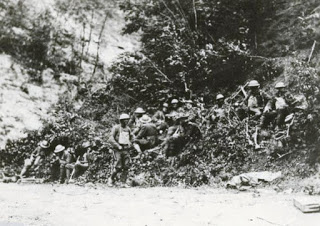
Troops of the 16th Infantry rest near Berzy le Sec, France, 17 Jul 1918 the day before the attack at Soissons.

The American 1st Division was bivouacked in the Forêt de Compiègne on 16 July and spent the entire day under cover of the woods to avoid detection by German aircraft. On 17 July, the division moved to the area near Mortefontaine, approximately 8 mi (12.9 km) from their jump-off point. At 9:00 pm the division began to move eastward through the forest along trails cratered with shell holes. Soon after, a thunderstorm began turning the trails into a quagmire. Compelled to march off the trail and aided only by flashes of lightning, the infantry moved forward hanging onto the equipment of the man ahead to maintain the column.

=== 2nd Division ===
Paquette's order of transfer included orders for the 2nd Field Artillery Brigade of the American 2nd Division to move to Betz during the night of 14/15 July. Brigadier General Albert J. Bowley went ahead of the brigade to Chantilly to confer with General Mangin who confirmed the orders. He then had Bowley send the brigade to a point in the Forêt de Retz. At the same time the division trains and transports were ordered to concentrate under cover in the vicinity of Lizy-sur-Ourcq.

In his memoirs Major General James G. Harbord, commander of the American 2nd Division, complained he “found the 2nd Division entering another disorganizing secret mission … scattering its units with no information to the Division of their actual destination … Thus when the new Division Commander arrived he found a command short of artillery and trains, and no one in authority there who had any idea as to the purpose of the movements or when, if ever, the Division might expect to be brought together again”. On Tuesday night Harbord was informed by Berdoulat his division would be in the attack on Thursday at daybreak. With his division “scattered through the Aisne Department … our Division would arrive at Marcilly, where they would be met by an unknown with orders, but I knew nothing of where they were to go … had been completely removed from the knowledge and control of its responsible Commander, and deflected by truck and by marching through France to a destination uncommunicated to any authority responsible for its supply, its safety or its efficiency in an attack thirty hours away. General Berdoulat and his people were unable to say where it would be debussed or where orders could reach it which would move it to its place in time."

While visiting with Berdoulat on 16 July, Berdoulat's operations officer offered to write the battle orders for the American 2nd Division. Again on 17 July, while in Vivières, General Albert Daugan, commander of the Moroccan 1st Division, offered Harbord battle orders prepared by his chief of staff, Colonel Henri Giraud. Harbord refused both sets of orders stating later, “If I had accepted either orders and disaster had occurred, what would have been my position?”

During the evening of the 16/17 July, Harbord and his staff went to the headquarters of Major General Robert L. Bullard in Taillefontaine on the northern edge of the Forêt de Retz. Here Harbord and his chief of staff, Colonel Preston Brown, “spent the rest of the night studying maps and preparing our attack order” with no opportunity to reconnoiter the area.” Because he had no information regarding their whereabouts, Harbord had no idea if the unit he assigned to lead the attack would arrive first or last. Also of concern was that each unit commander be assigned a definite location where he could be found if needed during the attack.

Harbord and his staff set out after dawn to locate his division to distribute orders and prepare it for the coming attack. They were able to locate Bowley and his artillery brigade near the Carrefour de Nemours but were unable to locate any of Harbord's other commanders or units. Colonel Paul B. Malone, commander of the 23rd Infantry Regiment, was first to arrive with part of his command. After receiving his orders, Malone was ordered to send selected officers to locate the remainder of the division, inform them of their area of concentration and the location of Division HQ.

Much of the American 2nd Division began to arrive west of the Forêt de Retz out in the open mid-morning on 17 July. Screened from enemy aircraft and balloons by dense cloud cover, they were debussed twelve to 15 mi (24 km) from their position for attack. Moving into the Forêt de Retz, the American 2nd Division found themselves experiencing the same conditions as the American 1st Division. They slogged their way forward through the Moroccan 1st Division, two French second-line divisions, a division of the 30th Corps, a Cavalry Corps, tanks, Corps and Army artillery, and all the special services supporting these troops. Having gone without sleep for 48 hours, the men would fall asleep on their feet at every halt. After one such halt, an officer in search of the missing half of his column found a horse had stepped sideways in front of a tired marine. The marine had fallen asleep with his head pressed against the horse's flank and had broken the line.

Harbord said of the experience, “All arriving units told … of the weary night ride and the arbitrary debussment at unknown points, and of the lack of information and of an inevitable dispersion as a consequence of no co-ordination of the several bus groups. They had no maps, no guides, and they were not told where to go.” At the announced resupply point, which Harbord expropriated from the American 1st Division, there was not enough ammunition to go around. Most of the machine guns were lost in the rear area and did not rejoin the division until 19 July. As a consequence the 5th Machine Gun Battalion received its guns the day of the battle and the 4th Machine Gun Battalion made its way into the forest without guns and ammunition. The 6th Machine Gun Battalion, although carrying guns and ammunition, did not arrive at the jump-off point in time to go over with the infantry.

Malone had two of his battalions in place before the attack but was informed by one of his staff his third battalion was missing. In the rain and darkness he located the missing battalion, plus two Marine battalions who were also lost. Once the two Marine battalions were set on the right trails Malone double-timed his battalion toward the front the last 1 mi (1.6 km) and had to run the last 984 ft (300 m) to gain the rolling barrage.

By contrast, the Moroccan 1st Division had been holding this section of the front and was familiar with the terrain. Their movement leading up to the attack consisted of pulling in their flanks to make room for the two American divisions.

=== German Army ===
On 19 June 1918, prior to the start of the fifth offensive, the German Ninth Army was transferred from Romania on the Eastern Front to the Western Front. On 23 June, the Ninth Army was assigned the sector to the left of the Eighteenth Army and the right of the Seventh Army which was, from the German perspective, the right shoulder of the Marne Salient.

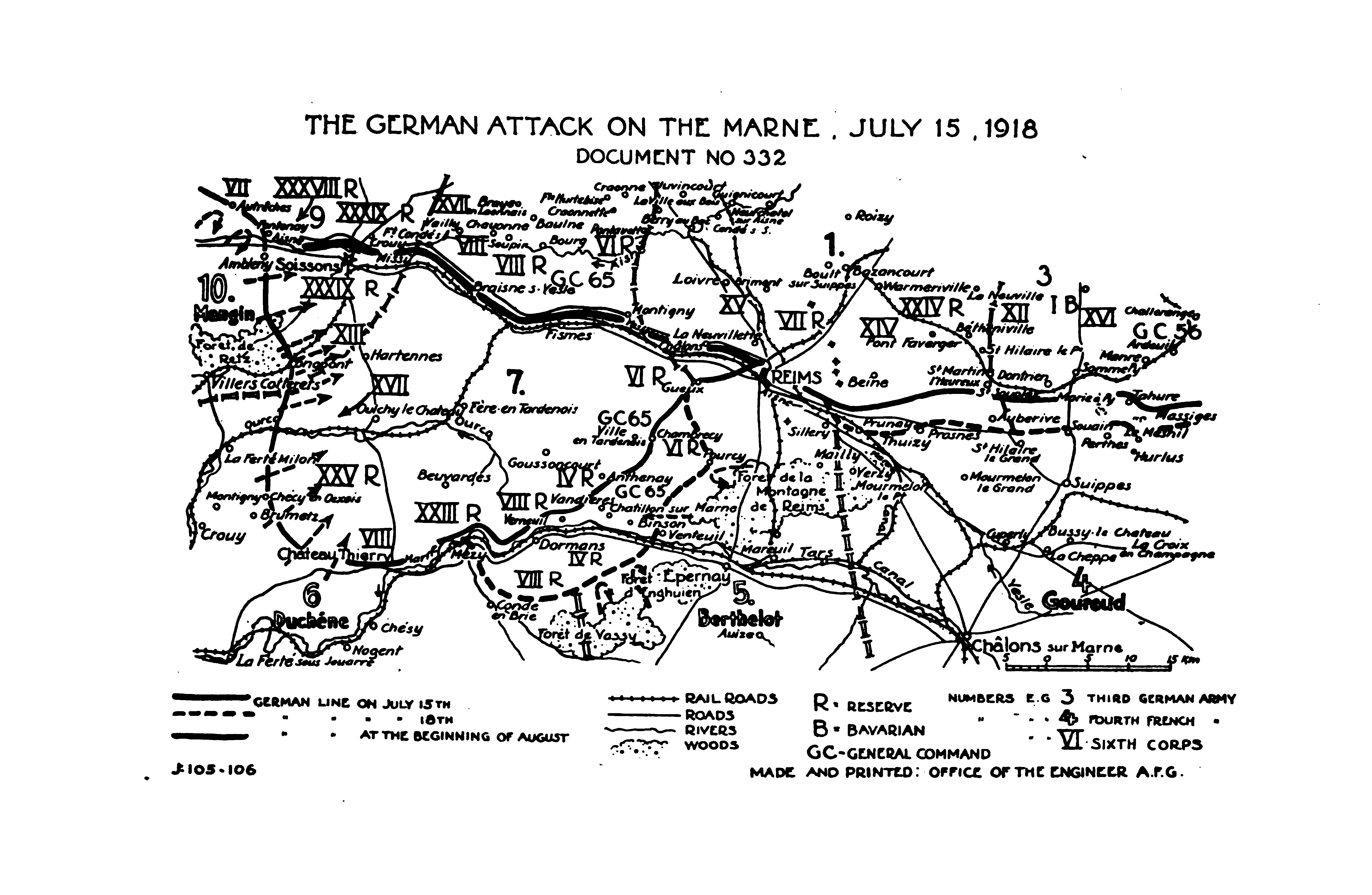
Disposition of German Forces for the attack on the Marne 15 July 1918.

Three corps, each consisting of three divisions, were assigned to the Ninth Army. VII Corps was assigned the right flank of the sector, XIII Corps was assigned the left flank, and the XXXIX Reserve Corps was assigned the sector in the center. In addition, four divisions were held in Army reserve while a fifth division was held in Army Group reserve in the Ninth Army sector. XIII Corps was south of the Aisne River. XXXIX Reserve Corps straddled the Aisne with the Bavarian 11th Division positioned on the south bank and the German 241st Division on the north bank.

Despite Foch's efforts to keep his attack secret, German documents from 11 July indicated deserters informed them of a large buildup of troops in the Forêt de Retz and of an impending large-scale attack. The Germans expected the attack would be launched south of the Aisne River with the main thrust directed against the German XIII Corps.

In an effort to strengthen their defenses south of the Aisne, the Germans placed artillery batteries in the German 241st Division sector assuring artillery enfilade fire to the south. The German 46th Reserve Division was brought up in support of the VII Corps. The German 14th Division was placed in support of the XXXIX Reserve Corps north of the Aisne and the German 34th Division was brought up in support of the XXXIX Reserve Corps south of the Aisne. The German 6th Division was brought up to shore up the sector boundary between the XXXIX Reserve Corps and XIII Corps. The German 47th Reserve and 28th Divisions were brought up to support the XIII Corps. The 28th Division was concentrated on the south bank of the Aisne. Finally, the artillery of the German 211th Division in VII Corps was transferred to the German 28th Division sector.

On the evening of 11 July, General Johannes von Eben, commander of the German Ninth Army, sent orders to his corps commanders to establish lines of resistance with strong points at Pernant, Beaurepaire Farm, west of Villers-Hélon, and the hills of Chouy. A second line of resistance with strong points at Saconin-et-Breuil, Chaudun, Vierzy, and the west edge of the Bois de Mauloy near St. Rémy-Blanzy was also to be established. Beginning on the evening 12 July, artillery of the Ninth Army began firing on points of assembly and routes of approach in order to interfere as much as possible with Allied preparations. It was also reported that Allied infantry columns were spotted moving east from Taillefontaine.

== Order of battle ==
The following is a list of the major units which were in place at the start of the battle 18 July 1918. In all cases divisions are listed north to south (left to right when looking at a map from the Allied perspective).

=== Allied order of battle ===
Allied order of battle
- Allied Armies:
  - Marshal Ferdinand Foch, Commanding
  - General Maxime Weygand, Chief of Staff
  - Armies of the North and Northeast:
    - General Philipe Pétain, Commanding
    - General Edmond Buat, Chief of Staff
  - American General Headquarters:
    - General John J. Pershing, Commanding
    - Major General James W. McAndrew, Chief of Staff
  - Group of Armies of the Reserve:
    - General Émile Fayolle, Commanding
    - General Gabriel Alexandre Paquette, Chief of Staff
    - French Tenth Army:
      - General Charles E. Mangin, Commanding
      - Colonel Émile Hergault, Chief of Staff
      - French I Corps:
        - General Gustave Paul Lacapelle, Commanding
        - French 69th Division
        - French 153rd Division
      - French XX Corps:
        - General Pierre Émile Berdoulat, Commanding
        - American 1st Division
          - Major General Charles Pelot Summerall, Commanding
          - Colonel Campbell King, Chief of Staff
          - 1st Infantry Brigade
            - 16th Infantry Regiment
            - 18th Infantry Regiment
            - 2nd Machine Gun Battalion
          - 2nd Infantry Brigade
            - 26th Infantry Regiment
            - 28th Infantry Regiment
            - 3rd Machine Gun Battalion
          - 1st Field Artillery Brigade
            - 5th Field Artillery Regiment
            - 6th Field Artillery Regiment
            - 7th Field Artillery Regiment
            - 1st Trench Mortar Battery
          - 1st Machine Gun Battalion
        - Moroccan 1st Division
          - General Albert Daugan, Commanding
          - Colonel Henri Giraud, Chief of Staff
          - 1st Moroccan Brigade
            - Marching Regiment of the Foreign Legion, R.M.L.E.
            - Russian Legion Battalion
            - 12th Malagazy Tirailleurs Regiment
          - 2nd Moroccan Brigade
            - 7th Algerian Tirailleurs Regiment
            - 8th Zouave Regiment
        - American 2nd Division
          - Major General James Harbord, Commanding
          - Colonel Preston Brown, Chief of Staff
          - 3rd Infantry Brigade
            - 9th Infantry Regiment
            - 23rd Infantry Regiment
            - 5th Machine Gun Battalion
          - 4th Marine Brigade
            - 5th Marine Regiment
            - 6th Marine Regiment
            - 6th Machine Gun Battalion
          - 2nd Field Artillery Brigade
            - 12th Field Artillery Regiment
            - 15th Field Artillery Regiment
            - 17th Field Artillery Regiment
            - 2nd Trench Mortar Battery
          - 4th Machine Gun Battalion
      - American III Corps: (In reserve) (Note: Administrative control only of American units in French Tenth Army)
        - Major General Bullard, Commanding
        - Brigadier General Alfred William Bjornstad, Chief of Staff
      - French XXX Corps:
        - General Hippolyte-Alphonse Penet, Commanding
        - French 38th Division
        - French 48th Division
      - French XI Corps:
        - General Prax, Commanding
        - French 128th Division
        - French 41st Division

=== German order of battle ===
German order of battle
- German Armies:
  - First Quartermaster-General Erich Friedrich Ludendorff, Commanding
  - Army Group German Crown Prince
    - Crown Prince Friedrich Wilhelm Ernst, Commanding
    - Major General Count Schulenburg, Chief of Staff
    - German Ninth Army
      - General Johannes von Eben, Commanding
      - Lieutenant Colonel von Esebeck, Chief of Staff
      - VII Corps
        - General Wilhelm von Woyna, Commanding
        - German 223rd Division
        - German 211th Division
        - German 202nd Division
      - XXXIX Reserve Corps
        - General Hermann von Staabs, Commanding
        - German 53rd Reserve Division
        - German 241st Division
        - Bavarian 11th Division
      - XIII Corps
        - General Theodor von Watter, Commanding
        - German 42nd Division
        - German 14th Reserve Division
        - German 115th Division
      - Army Reserve
        - German 14th Division
        - German 34th Division
        - German 47th Reserve Division
        - German 23rd Division
    - German Seventh Army
      - Colonel General Max von Boehn, Commanding
      - XXV Reserve Corps
        - General Arnold von Winckler
        - German 40th Division
        - Bavarian 10th Division
        - German 78th Reserve Division
      - VIII Corps
        - General Roderich von Schoeler
        - German 4th Ersatz Division
        - German 87th Division
        - German 201st Division
      - XXIII Reserve Corps
        - General Hugo von Kathen
        - German 10th Landwehr Division
        - German 36th Division
      - VIII Reserve Corps
        - General Georg von Wichura
        - Bavarian 6th Reserve Division
        - 23rd Division
        - 200th Division
        - 1st Guard Division
      - IV Reserve Corps
        - General Richard von Conta
        - 37th Division
        - 113th Division
        - 10th Reserve Division
        - 2nd Guard Division
      - V Bavarian Corps
        - General Eberhard Graf von Schmettow
        - 195th Division
        - Bavarian 12th Division
        - 22nd Division
        - 103rd Division (only 2/3)
      - VI Reserve Corps
        - General Kurt von dem Borne
        - 123rd Division
        - 103rd Division (only 1/3)
        - 50th Division
        - 88th Division
      - Army Group Reserve
        - German 6th Division

== The Battle ==
The American 1st Division was assigned to the northernmost attack zone in the French XX Corps sector with the French 153rd Division of the French I Corps to their north. The American 2nd Division was assigned to the southernmost attack zone with the French 38th Division to their south. Sandwiched between the two American divisions was the Moroccan 1st Division. Two French divisions were held in reserve. Forty squadrons of the French 1st Air Division were attached to the French Tenth Army to provide air support. However, the orders given to the aviators indicate they were there principally to provide reconnaissance.

Attached to the American 1st Division were the French 253rd Field Artillery Regiment (truck-carried 75 mm field guns), and the French 11th and 12th Tank Groups (light tanks). The artillery of the French 58th Division and the French 288th Field Artillery Regiment as well as the French 11th and 12th Tank Groups (heavy tanks) were attached to the American 2nd Division. Attached to the Moroccan 1st Division were the French 4th Tank Group and the French 29th Field Artillery Regiment (truck-carried 75 mm field guns).

=== Day 1: Thursday, 18 July 1918 ===
Just prior to the start of the assault, the Germans in the zone of attack of the American 1st Division, 2nd Brigade and that of the French 153rd Division to their north fired a weak counter barrage. Deserting or captured soldiers from the French 153rd had warned the 11th Bavarian Division of the impending attack between 4:00 am and 5:00 am. The artillery fire, which was concentrated on the crossroads at Cutry, inflicted 25% casualties on the 3rd Battalion, 28th Infantry, 1st Division which was designated as the support battalion for the advance.

At 4:35 am, Allied artillery fire was directed at the German Ninth Army in the sectors of the German 202nd Division on the southern flank of the German VII Corps, the entire front of the German XXXIX Reserve Corps and the German XIII Corps. The entire front of the German XXV Reserve Corps and the northern flank of the German VIII Corps in the German Seventh Army also came under artillery fire.

==== American 1st Division ====
===== 2nd Brigade =====
====== 28th Infantry Regiment ======
The attack began with a rolling barrage, advancing at a rate of 328 ft (100 m) every two minutes, across the entire front with the infantry rushing forward to gain the barrage. Both the 26th and 28th Infantry Regiments went into the attack without grenades and their ammunition carriers were out of contact to the rear. For the initial assault, 2nd Battalion served as the 28th Infantry's assault battalion with 3rd Battalion following in support and 1st Battalion held in division reserve. Initially the attack was met with little resistance. However, 28th Infantry began taking heavy fire directed at its flanks as they approached Saint Amand Farm, a strong point in the French 153rd Division's zone to their north. A portion of 2nd Battalion veered northeast and the farm was taken by 7:00 am.

Well north of the division boundary, 2nd Battalion was now directly in front of Missy Ravine, which the French 153rd Division was told by Mangin to avoid. On the western edge of the ravine was the village of le Mont d’Arly. At the bottom of the ravine and further north into the French 153rd Division sector was Saconin-et-Breuil. Directly across from le Mont d’Arly, on the eastern lip of the ravine, was the village of Breuil. A fourth village, Missy-aux-Bois, was on the southeastern lip of the ravine in the sector of 26th Infantry. The Germans had artillery, machine guns, and infantry emplacements throughout the ravine as well as artillery on the eastern bank. Across the bottom of the western edge of the ravine was a swamp with footbridges.

When two companies of 2nd Battalion attempted to cross the ravine they were met with withering machine-gun fire from Saconin-et-Breuil and artillery fire from Breuil. A second attempt saw them advance another 300 yd (274 m) while taking heavy casualties. Of the five French tanks that ventured down the slopes of the ravine, three were destroyed by artillery fire and two sank in the swamp.

The commanders of the 2nd and 3rd Battalions decided they needed to combine forces to reach the eastern edge of the ravine. Wading elsewhere through the waist deep swamp, the combined force made it up the eastern bank of Missy Ravine and captured all the guns by 9:30 am. While still under heavy machine-gun fire, the men formed a consolidated line 300 yd (274 m) east of Breuil. Having lost all of its officers, 2nd Battalion was reorganized into five small platoons plus a machine gun platoon, each commanded by a sergeant.

While the combined force was attacking east across the ravine, Company M of 3rd Battalion had been placed in reserve near le Mont d’Arly. Here they spotted a large group of Germans emerge from a cave intending to attack the 2nd and 3rd Battalions from the rear. Two platoons from M Company fired on the Germans and drove them back into the cave where they held out until 4:00 pm. Twenty officers and about 500 soldiers were captured along with trench mortars and machine guns. Later in the day, another large group of German medical personnel were discovered in the same cave. These were put to work in a common aid station treating wounded from both sides.

By 11:00 am, Colonel Conrad Babcock, commander of 28th Infantry Regiment, was conferring with the French of the 153rd Division about moving 2nd Battalion back into its own sector. However, the French 153rd Division was failing to keep abreast in the attack. This was due in large part to the southward facing entrenchments in the division's zone of attack. These entrenchments followed favorable terrain with a series of strong points which dominated the plateau running southwest from the town of Vauxbuin. This defensive position allowed the Germans to fire into the open flank of the 28th Infantry which was attacking across their front. The Germans considered this position to be the key to defending Soissons. When the German XIII Corps was informed of the attack, it was the first to be reinforced; initially by one brigade and then three more brigades later in the day. The French 153rd Division eventually took Saconin-et-Breuil and sent a battalion to relieve the Americans. All of 2nd Battalion was back in their attack zone by 2:00 pm.

====== 26th Infantry Regiment ======
26th Infantry Regiment had taken their first objective by 5:30 am. and halted halfway to Missy-aux-Bois. The regiment continued eastward and took Missy-aux-Bois on the southern lip of Missy Ravine by 9:00 am. They advanced about 0.62 mi (1 km) east of Missy-aux-Bois before being pinned down just west of the Soissons–Paris road by machine gun fire from the eastern side of the road.

===== 1st Brigade =====
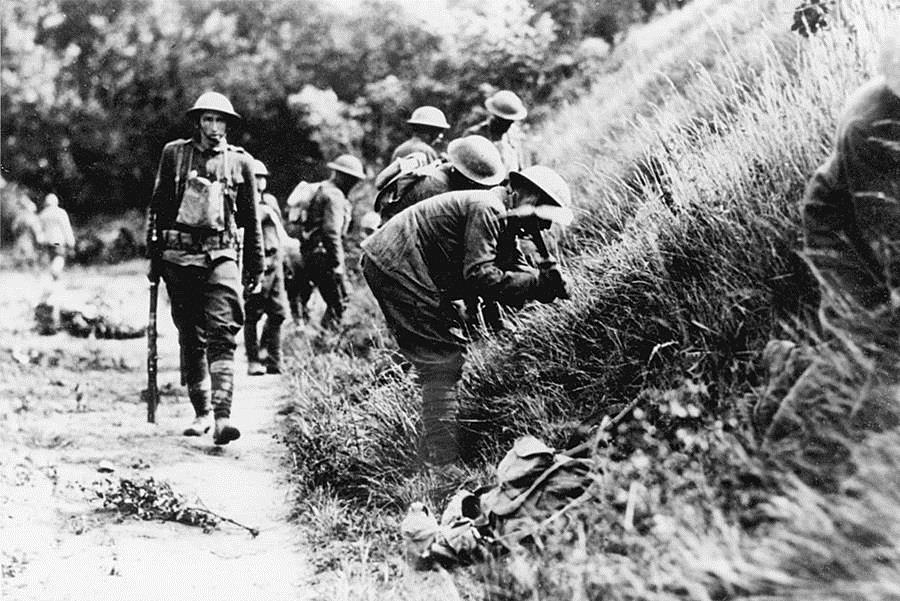
16th Infantry Regiment digging in north of Chaudun, 18 July 1918

1st Brigade advanced eastward to the intermediate objective, the line La Glaux Tillieul – La Glaux, behind a rolling barrage advancing at the rate of 328 ft (100 m) every two minutes. Because their advance was not slowed by ravines, the left flank of the 16th Infantry on the north of the brigade sector became exposed. Further to the south 18th Infantry was able to keep pace with 16th Infantry. The Moroccan 1st Division, on the right flank of 18th Infantry, kept pace to the first objective but slowed to 328 ft (100 m) every 4 minutes beyond that point. As 18th Infantry pushed forward their right flank became exposed and they started taking enfilading machine gun fire from Cravançon Farm. Colonel Frank Parker sent an element of 18th Infantry into the Moroccan 1st Division's zone to deal with the problem. Shortly thereafter, Cravançon Farm was in American hands. Both the 16th and 18th Infantry Regiments were far enough south of the machine guns at Vauxbuin to be out of range and by 8:30 am both regiments had crossed the Soissons–Paris road. Both regiments reformed and advanced through the Chaudun Position to take the wheat fields north of Chaudun.

By 11:00 am, the American 1st Division captured both objectives Foch had hoped for by the end of the day. Berdoulat, wishing to exploit his early success, issued orders for the American 1st Division to reach the line Berzy-le-Sec – Buzancy facing northeast to block the southern outlets of the Crise River. The French 153rd Division was tasked with capturing Berzy-le-Sec and the Moroccan 1st Division was assigned the taking of Buzancy. 1st Division spent the afternoon preparing to go on the attack again at 5:00 pm. Artillery was moved forward, food and ammunition was distributed, and telephone lines were strung. Unable to secure artillery support to suppress the heavy enfilading machine gun fire from the Vauxbin Position, 2nd Brigade was unable to advance beyond the 2nd objective. 1st Brigade was on the third objective just north of Buzancy.

Having lost ground and most of their artillery that morning, the Germans rushed all available reserves to the area. Defensive positions bristling with machine guns were set up west of the Soissons – Château-Thierry road roughly along the line Soissons – Belleu – Noyant-et-Aconin – Hartennes-et-Taux. New artillery was placed on the hills overlooking the Soissons – Château-Thierry road 3 mi (4.8 km) from the front and fresh machine gun units were brought up.

==== Moroccan 1st Division ====
The attack zone of the Moroccan 1st Division was on the right flank of the 18th Infantry, 1st Division and the left flank of the 5th Marines, 2nd Division. While it was one of only three French Divisions which still had twelve battalions, it had been fighting over the same ground since May and was well below strength. At the start of the attack, the division was supported by 48 Schneider tanks. The 1st RMLE (Foreign Legion Provisional Regiment) and an attached Senegalese battalion were to advance north of the Bois de l’Equippe. Two Senegalese battalions, in liaison with the 5th Marines, passed south along the Route Quesnoy through the Bois de Quesnoy. The Legionnaires came up a bit late but eventually made contact with 18th Infantry and fought their way across the Soissons–Paris road. Just east of the road was Cravançon Farm and beyond that was the town Chaudun. While both villages were within the northern boundary of the Moroccan 1st Division attack zone, it was the American 1st Division who took Cravançon Farm and the 5th Marines, for the most part, that took Chaudun.

The events surrounding the taking of Chaudun are a piece of disputed history. It involves Marines from the south, 18th Infantry soldiers from the north, and the Senegalese. According to the 18th Infantry's historian, Chaudun was taken by the regiment and turned over to the French. But Marine Corps historians reject the 18th Infantry version claiming “the town was taken by Company A, 5th Marines, with some hangers-on, none of whom were from the 1st Division.” The statement published by the American Battle Monuments Commission says “the town, in the zone of the Moroccan division, was captured on July 18 in an attack in which the 2nd Division participated. The attack was launched from the south."

About 10:00 am, the Moroccan 1st Division, aided by tanks, mounted an attack toward the Rapière at the southern edge of the Villemontoire Ravine. The German defenses collapsed and ran to the rear past Villemontoire. By noon the 2nd Battalion, 110th Grenadiers, 28th Division was isolated on the western lip of Chazelle Ravine and forced to withdraw to rally positions east of the Soissons–Paris road. The 3rd Battalion, 110th Grenadiers, 28th Division was called forward from their reserve position to defend the northern portion of the sector near Léchelle. The battalion was attacked by a mixed force assisted by armored vehicles. The attacking force tried to envelop the German position from the south in the direction of Charentigny. Short rounds from a German artillery barrage mistakenly fell on its own troops causing heavy casualties and forced the battalion to withdraw north of Buzancy.

By midday, the Moroccan 1st Division had pushed forward on its own schedule but had been greatly assisted by both American divisions on its flanks. However, their attack stalled due to the Americans encroaching into their sector on both sides. By the end of the day the division withdrew slightly on its northern flank to connect with the 18th Infantry just north of Chaudun. On its southern flank they advanced southeastward to connect with the 5th Marines holding the southern edge of Léchelle Ravine.

==== American 2nd Division ====
===== 4th Marine Brigade =====
====== 5th Marine Regiment ======
The assigned attack zone of the 5th Marine Regiment was the northern (left) flank of the 2nd Division. Because the 6th Marine Regiment was designated as general reserve for XX Corps by Berdoulat, the 5th Marines were assigned the attack frontage of an entire brigade. This forced Lieutenant Colonel Logan Feland, commander of the 5th Marines, to use two assault battalions rather than the standard assault, support, reserve formation. The jump-off line for the regiment was well back in the Forêt de Retz and stretched southeast to liaise with 3rd Brigade whose jump-off line was in the fields east of the forest.

Approaching the jump-off line in standard formation, 1st Battalion double-timed the final stretch not long after the barrage started. The following 2nd Battalion deployed to its right and the understrength 3rd Battalion followed in support. The attack plan called for 5th Marines to wheel right in a southeasterly direction as they approached Maison Neuve after emerging from the forest. Approximately half of the Marines in the frontline assault failed to make the change of direction. Three of 2nd Battalion's companies wheeled too far to the south and crossed the 9th Infantry sector. It joined elements of 23rd Infantry clearing Vauxcastille which was just over the division's southern boundary in the attack zone of the French 38th Division. A group of Americans from the 5th Marines and 23rd Infantry, apparently lost, were captured around noon between Missy-aux-Bois and Soissons near the Soissons–Paris road. This group crossed the entire front of French XX Corps and a German Corps.

49th Company, 1st Battalion lost contact with the Moroccan 1st Division's liaison not long after breaking onto the fields of the plateau. Most of the Senegalese turned north to flank the Bois du Quesnoy while 49th Company started taking fire from Maison Neuve and Chaudun. Maison Neuve was just over the northern boundary of the 5th Marine's attack zone while Chaudun was near the northern boundary of the Moroccan 1st Division's attack zone. 17th Company of 1st Battalion, part of 2nd Battalion's 55th Company (detailed with maintaining liaison between battalions), and about 20 Senegalese fighters moved with 49th Company on Chaudun. After heavy fighting, Chaudun fell to the Marines and the Senegalese fighters around 9:00 am while other Marine elements cleared Maison Neuve.

Once Chaudun was taken, the Marine battalions reassembled and worked their way back into their sector. They halted at the northern end of Vierzy Ravine which was their second objective. The ravine ran completely across the entire front of the 2nd Division from Maison Neuve at the northern end to Vauxcastille at the southern end. At the bottom of the ravine near Vauxcastille, the ravine ran due east to the town of Vierzy. Beyond Vierzy was the line which represented the XX Corps objective.

===== 3rd Brigade =====
====== 9th Infantry Regiment ======
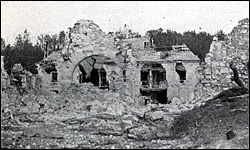
La Verte-Feuille Farm after its capture by the 2nd Infantry Division (United States) on the morning of 18 July 1918.

On the night of 17 July, Colonel LaRoy Upton, commander of the 9th Infantry Regiment, managed to get all but two of his companies through the Forêt de Retz and into position before midnight. Companies L and M were not in position until 4:15 am and 3:00 am, respectively. 1st Battalion led the 9th Infantry attack with 2nd Battalion following in support and 3rd Battalion in reserve. Because the Marines on their left were a few minutes late and the supporting tanks had not arrived on time, 9th Infantry began taking flanking machine-gun fire from their left almost immediately. 1st Battalion turned left to face the fire and fought their way north toward Verte-Feuille Farm. At about 5:45 am the supporting tanks caught up to the front line and circled around the farm. At about the same time elements of the 5th Marines charged out of the woods to capture Verte-Feuille Farm. 1st Battalion continued northeast, cutting across the 5th Marines attack zone into the Moroccan 1st Division's sector to fight at Maison Neuve.

Although 3rd Battalion was supposed to be in regimental reserve, Lieutenant Ladislav Janda, commander of Company M, noticed his company was advancing with the first wave as 1st and 2nd Battalion veered off to the left while other troops were approaching from the right. While Janda kept his company on course, he received word the troops on his right were from 23rd Infantry. By 5:15 am, Company M had seized control of Beaurepaire Farm on the southern boundary of 9th Infantry's attack zone, just as the rolling barrage passed the farm. While rounding up the surviving Germans a stray platoon from Company I arrived. In taking the farm, Company M lost about forty percent of its strength.

====== 23rd Infantry Regiment ======
The 23rd Infantry Regiment had the southernmost attack zone in XX Corps with the French 38th Division on its right flank. 2nd Battalion was the attack battalion for 23rd Infantry with 1st Battalion in support and 3rd Battalion in reserve. To ensure his battalion made the attack on time, Major d’Arly Fechet had his men double-time the last few hundred yards/meters to the jump off line.

Early in the attack, 23rd Infantry made the turn to the southeast and proceeded in good order until they reached Vauxcastille where they met stiff resistance. With their right flank exposed, elements of both the 1st and 2nd Battalions moved into the French 38th Division attack zone while elements of 3rd Battalion were sent forward piecemeal. 23rd Infantry surrounded Vauxcastille and, after heavy fighting, the Germans were driven from the town. A large number of the Germans who fled Vauxcastille hid in the nearby caves but were captured later in the afternoon.

===== Afternoon =====
By mid-morning both the 9th Infantry and 23rd Infantry commanders moved their command posts forward to Beaurepaire Farm. They were joined by Brigadier General Hanson Ely, commander of 3rd Brigade, and his staff just past noon. Around mid-afternoon, Harbord advised Ely of the attack order for the following day. However, the start positions for the attack had not yet been captured. Ely set about getting his regimental commanders and the 5th Marines prepared to make a late afternoon attack. The plan called for the attack to start at 6:00 pm but the French tank commander said he could not be ready before 7:00 pm. Ely then ordered the infantry to attack when ready but not later than 6:00 pm, with the tanks to join the attack as soon as possible. The attack eventually commenced at 7:00 pm.

9th Infantry, reinforced with the 5th Marines, attacked in the northern sector of Vierzy Ravine and moved east. The plan called for two attacking battalions with two battalions in support on a front over a 1,000 yd (900 m) wide. From the outset the attack met with resistance on the right front. After advancing about 1 mi (1.6 km), the attack ran into heavy enfilading machine-gun fire from Léchelle Woods and Ravine on the left flank.

On the left flank of the advance, 2nd Battalion, 5th Marines turned northeast toward the fire following the support tanks. When the Germans fired an intense artillery barrage, the tanks reversed course and retreated through the Marines' front line with the artillery barrage following in their wake. When the barrage passed, the Marines cleared out the defensive positions and continued east. These same defensive positions had been holding up the Moroccan attack. The German southern flank was now completely exposed.

In the southern portion of the division sector, some elements of 23rd Infantry and attached Marines approached Vierzy in the morning, causing most of the German defenders to flee. But because the fight for Vauxcastille lasted until almost 6:00 pm, 23rd Infantry was not able to move forward in force. The Germans finally gave up Vauxcastille when the town was surrounded by 1st and 2nd Battalion and French tanks east of the town.

While the fight for Vauxcastille was playing out all afternoon, the Germans reoccupied Vierzy and fiercely defended the town. 23rd Infantry with 2nd Battalion on the left and 1st Battalion on the right (each with parts of 3rd Battalion and some men from 9th Infantry intermingled) attacked around 6:30 pm. At about 7:15 pm, a battalion of Moroccan troops and 15 tanks supported the attack in conjunction with heavy machine gun and artillery fire. Adding to the confusion was the French 38th Division of XXX Corps. Operating in the sector south of 2nd Division, they were attacking to the north and east on a line Montrembœuf Ferme – Bois de Mauloy toward Parcy-et-Tigny, well beyond the Americans. Because the French 38th Division threatened to envelop Vierzy the Germans were forced to vacate the town. Both brigades of the 2nd Division were ordered to move their command posts to Vierzy. After Vierzy fell, 1st Battalion pushed east to a point 1.86 mi (3 km) beyond the town.

==== German Army ====
Despite foreknowledge of the attack, the Germans were overwhelmed by its magnitude. By noon, the entire front of the German Ninth Army south of the Aisne and the right of the German Seventh Army had been pushed back to the line Vauxbuin – Missy-aux-Bois – Chaudun – Vierzy – east of Villers-Hélon – Villers-le-Petit – Chouy – Neuilly-Saint-Front – Macogny – Breuil.

To slow the advance, the German 46th Reserve Division was ordered to advance southward across the Aisne River and prepare defenses in the hills east of Buzancy. In addition, the 211th Division, currently in Vrigny, and elements of the 3rd Reserve Division not yet in the line were placed at the disposal of the German Ninth Army. Also, XIII Corps, under command of General Oskar von Watter, was placed under orders of the Seventh Army.

As the situation continued to deteriorate in the afternoon, Army Group German Crown Prince ordered the 20th Division forward in the valley of the Aisne to Sermoise and the 9th Division to the valley of the Vesle to Fismes. Both divisions, as well as the 19th Ersatz Division, were made available to the Seventh Army. In addition, the 51st Reserve Division, the 10th Division and 33rd Division were added to the Seventh Army reserves. Troops were told that falling back was out of the question and the line must be held under all contingencies.

The Army Group German Crown Prince War Diary entry for 18 July indicates that much of the artillery for the German Ninth Army had been sent to support the Marneschutz-Reims offensive of 15 July. It also indicated the divisions composing the German Ninth Army had not been brought up to full strength and many of the men were suffering from the Spanish flu. When it became apparent that the Allied attacks were extensive, the Army Group found itself without reserves to stop the Allied advance. The entry also acknowledges that the Allied penetration toward Soissons put the entire German Seventh Army in danger of being cut off. By the end of the day, the Army Group issued orders to the troops south of the Marne to withdraw to the north bank during the night.

=== Day 2: Friday, 19 July 1918 ===
The attack outlined in Tenth Army Order 301 was a “continuation of the attack for the purpose of gaining the objectives announced for 18 July. The attack will be launched at 4:00 am with the assistance of tanks under the same condition as for 18 July.”

Although there is no record of their release from XX Corps, the 6th Marines were taken out of reserve to replace the 5th Marines on the northern flank of 2nd Division.

==== American 1st Division ====
===== 2nd Brigade =====
For the American 1st Division, the objective for the day was to reach the line Berzy-le-Sec – Buzancy. The taking of Berzy-le-Sec was assigned to the French 153rd Division and Buzancy assigned to the Moroccan 1st Division. The rolling barrage by the 1st Artillery Brigade opened on time. However, they were firing in support of the assumed jump-off line which had not been reached. Also, the rolling barrage was not the expected wall of fire as it was limited to one gun per 82 ft (25 m) per minute.

The Soissons–Paris road (Route 2) was the first obstacle for 2nd Brigade, 1st Division. The main German defense for this sector of the road was the Vauxbuin Position, a large concentration of machine guns on the high ground in the sector of the French 153rd Division. The fire from this position was able to reach into the 1st Brigade sector south of 2nd Brigade. Hill 166, just west of Route 2, was another strong point the Germans used to defend the road. Beyond Route 2 lay Ploisy Ravine and the village of Berzy-le-Sec. Berzy-le-Sec was just north of the division sector and overlooked the Soissons – Château-Thierry road and the railroad in the valley of the Crise.

3rd Battalion, 28th Infantry led the attack at 4:00 am on the northern flank of the division with 2nd Battalion in support and 1st Battalion in division reserve. As the assault moved forward, they received withering fire from across the road and the northern flank. After several attempts to cross the road 28th Infantry was forced to dig in and protect its open left flank. All of the tanks supporting the regiment were soon put out of action.

Informed that the French 153rd Division would attack at 5:30 pm, orders were issued by 1st Division headquarters for 28th Infantry to attack simultaneously. 1st Battalion was released from reserve and led the assault. Passing through the rest of the regiment, it clung to the rolling barrage and reached the objective, just outside Berzy-le-Sec. The remnants of 2nd and 3rd Battalions were placed in support of 1st Battalion but were soon moved forward on the left flank to plug the gap between 1st Division and the slow-moving French 153rd Division.

The 26th Infantry was able to cross the Soissons–Paris road during the morning attack at 4:30 am but were halted by fire from the front and the Vauxbuin Position. It also attacked at 5:30 pm and was able to advance 1.86 mi (3 km), assisting in the capture of Ploisy.

===== 1st Brigade =====
Acting on orders issued around noon, the German infantry withdrew all along the front of 1st Brigade and that of the Moroccan 1st Division allowing the regiments of the 1st Brigade to gain ground by the end of the day. The advance was still a slog as the Germans stubbornly defended the area with artillery and machine-gun fire. Because the 26th Infantry, 2nd Brigade was stymied most of the day, the left flank of 16th Infantry, 1st Brigade was exposed to flanking machine gun fire. 18th Infantry could only manage an advance of about 500 yd (457 m) facing reinforced machine-gun positions.

==== Moroccan 1st Division ====
The Moroccan 1st Division mounted two attacks during the day. Working around the flanks of Chazelle-Léchelle Ravine, they were able to overcome the resistance in front of them. Coupled with the attacks of the 2nd Division on 18 July, a 1.24 mi (2 km) gap in the German lines opened between Parcy-et-Tigny and Charentigny by 1:00 pm.

The German 20th Division launched a counterattack late in the afternoon causing the Moroccans to give up some of their earlier gains. By 6:45 pm the Germans took possession of Villemontoire, which had been abandoned by panicky German troops. During the evening, the Moroccans flanked the German position from the south along the western edge of the Villemontoire Ravine. Together with German artillery short rounds the Germans were driven off the position. However, by the end of the day the Germans were able to restore their defense of Villemontoire.

==== American 2nd Division ====
Due to the heavy casualties sustained by 5th Marines on 18 July, the 6th Marines were taken out of reserve to replace them on the northern flank of the division attack zone. The French 38th Division operating in the sector south of the 2nd Division attacked in a northeastern direction in the vicinity of Tigny. These attacks caused the Germans to designate the Soissons – Hartennes-et-Taux highway as the next defensive position.

The French XX Corps liaison officer delivering the attack orders for 19 July was unable to locate the 2nd Division headquarters until 2:00 am. This delay caused the attack, originally scheduled for 4:00 am, to be pushed back to 7:00 am. The 1st Battalion, 2nd Engineers and the 4th Machine Gun Battalion were designated as the division reserve. Twenty-eight French tanks were assigned to support the attack.

==== 6th Marines ====
The assembly area for the 6th Marines was southeast of Beaurepaire Farm approximately 1.55 mi (2.5 km) from the front. Battalion commanders chose a partially concealed route to the jump-off line adding another 0.6 mi (1 km) to the march. Failing to coordinate the actual jump-off time with the artillery, the Marines moved out from the assembly area when the rolling barrage commenced at 6::30 am. At 8:15 am, from the railway station in Vierzy, Lieutenant Colonel Harry Lee issued his order deploying the regiment. As with the 5th Marines the previous day, Lee used two attack battalions placing 1st Battalion on the right flank and 2nd Battalion on the left flank, with 3rd Battalion following in support.

While 2nd Battalion went north, 1st Battalion went through the town and up the east bank of the ravine to the plateau with the tanks following. Since the barrage was early the Germans knew an attack was imminent. When the Marines began their advance, they were still 1 mi (2 km) from the front line and about 2.5 mi (4 km) from their objective - the western edge of the Bois de Concrois.

As 2nd Battalion began moving east through the wheat fields, a heavy artillery barrage opened up. The advance was slower than normal as they kept pace with the tanks they were following. As soon as they passed through the front line they began taking machine gun fire from the elevations to the east and north. They advanced until 9:30 am where they occupied abandoned German foxholes. They remained there until 4:00 pm while taking continuous artillery, machine gun, and rifle fire.

1st Battalion advanced with the tanks which were dispersed at 50 yd (46 m) intervals. The tanks drew most of the artillery fire from German guns positioned about 4,000 yd (3,660 m) to the east. The Marines advanced steadily as they passed through the forward foxholes of 23rd Infantry into the wheat fields. The 75th Company stopped advancing when the last tank in its area took a direct hit and exploded. The 83rd and 84th Companies moved up to fill the gap between the two lead battalions; 83rd on the left and 84th on the right. The 97th and 82nd Companies remained in support behind the 84th and 83rd Companies, respectively.

At 10:30 am, it was reported that the advance line was about 0.6 mi (1 km) east of the old front line but taking heavy direct artillery fire and flanking machine gun fire. Ten minutes later 83rd and 84th Companies both reported 60% casualties. In response 82nd Company, and later elements of HQ Company, were sent forward. By 11:45 am, Lee reported 1st Battalion was held up about 300 yd (274 m) west of Tigny with no French troops on the right flank. He also stated casualties were 30% and growing.

Lieutenant Mason took over as commander of what was left of 84th Company. He led his men across open space to take an elevated strong point (Hill 160) which was about 600 yd (550 m) north of Tigny. This position was the furthest advance by the American 2nd Division in the battle, some 700 yd (640 m) short of the Soissons – Château-Thierry road.

3rd Battalion, 6th Marines had started the day with 36 officers and 850 men. By 8:00 pm, only 20 officers and 415 men could be accounted for. There was no facility for getting any but the walking wounded out of the fields between the front line and the battalion Command Post. It was impossible to move from one position to another without drawing fire.

During the day division HQ and the division CPs remained at Beaurepaire Farm, with all subordinate HQs established in and around Vierzy. Sometime during the afternoon of 19 July, Harbord assessed the situation and decided the 2nd Division could hold where they were but could not go forward. On this basis Harbord requested XX Corps relieve 2nd Division and continue the attack using a second line division passing through the front line of the American 2nd Division. The request for relief was approved by Mangin. Word of impending relief reached the forward elements at about 9:00 pm, 1.2 mi (2 km) short of its objective. The French 58th Colonial Division was moved up from XX Corps reserve on the night of 19/20 July.

The American 2nd Division attack on 19 July had reached a point where it could not be supported by artillery unless the artillery was moved forward. Under the existing conditions it was not considered advisable. The attack was held up on the right from the direction of Parcy-Tigny which had been reported to Harbord as being in French hands. Also, the left the flank was threatened as the Moroccan 1st Division had not advanced as far as Charentigny.

==== German Army ====
The Ninth Army morning report revealed the dire straits in which they found themselves. In their center, the XXXIX Reserve Corps reported that the 241st Division and the Bavarian 11th Division were all but annihilated. The 8th Division and portions of the 34th Division were all that remained on the front line. The remainder of the 34th Division was in Soissons, several miles/km from the front. The 211th Division was split, with part of the division northeast of Soissons and the remainder supporting the 46th Reserve Division in Belleu. The 53rd Reserve and the 14th Divisions remained on the north bank of the Aisne. The transfer of XIII Corps from Ninth Army to Seventh Army was completed during the evening of 18/19 July.

The Seventh Army reported that XIII Corps had been pushed back at Vierzy and southeast of Villers-Hélon in the direction of Parcy-et-Tigny and Villemontoire during the morning. By evening, the Allies advanced as far as the line Berzy-le-Sec – Visigneux – Charentigny – Tigny. Villemontoire was held by the 20th Division after a successful counter-attack recaptured the town. Seventh Army losses were exceedingly high in men and materiel.

By the end of the day, the single line of communications to the German front line in the salient was in effective range of Allied artillery. Coupled with the threat against the rear of the forces holding the salient, the decision was made to withdraw by echelon while strengthening the resistance power of the front. General Command XVII was inserted in the line between XIII Corps and the XXV Reserve Corps. By the end of the second day, Army Group Crown Prince was faced with a lack of fresh forces and no more reserves to strengthen the front. Orders were issued to begin the withdrawal the night of 19/20 July along with directions for rear guard actions in the days to follow.

=== Day 3: Saturday, 20 July 1918 ===
Rolling kitchens brought food and water forward to Ploisy during the night of 19/20 July. Six of the rolling kitchens were destroyed by artillery fire and a large number of casualties were inflicted among the men and animals of the train. German artillery fired gas and artillery shells into Ploisy Ravine along with intermittent machine-gun fire.

At 2:30 am Mangin forwarded the following instructions from Foch for continuing the attack on 20 July. “The battle now in progress must aim at the destruction of the enemy forces south of the Aisne and the Vesle … It will be continued by: The Tenth Army covered by the Aisne and subsequently the Vesle, aiming at the capture of the plateaus north of Fère-en-Tardenois, its right at Fère-en-Tardenois. The Sixth Army, supporting the advance of the Tenth Army and moving its left to Fère-en-Tardenois.”

When the fighting ended on 19 July, the American 1st Division front line faced northeast. The 28th Infantry Regiment was in Ploisy Ravine maintaining contact with the French 153rd Division. The 26th Infantry Regiment was north facing, maintaining liaison with 28th Infantry and 1st Brigade. The 1st Brigade front line ran from the edge of Ploisy Ravine and extended south near Chazelle where they connected with the Moroccan 1st Division.

To the north of the American 1st Division sector the city of Soissons sits in the northeast corner of a long, high plateau. Traveling south through the Crise River Valley are four elevated positions overlooking Soissons and its approaches. Montaigne de Paris overlooks and controls the southern transportation arteries into and out of Soissons. The high ground west of Vauxbuin and west of Courmelles is roughly parallel to Montaigne de Paris and approximately 1.86 mi (3 km) west of the Crise River. Berzy-le-Sec sits on the third elevated position and spills down into the valley where both the railroad and the highway run. Looking north from this position, one can actually see Soissons. The Noyant Plateau is east of Berzy-le-Sec and, although it sits at a higher elevation, the road and railway cannot be secured from this plateau. Possession of Berzy-le-Sec is the key to controlling the valley because it neutralizes both.

Owing to the importance of possessing Berzy-le-Sec and the failure of the French 153rd Division to take it, Mangin changed the divisional boundary between the French 153rd Division and the American 1st Division. The task of taking and holding Berzy-le-Sec was given to the American 1st Division. After a meeting to coordinate his attack with the French 153rd Division, Major General Charles P. Summerall took the 2nd Battalion, 18th Infantry from division reserve. He placed it under the command of Brigadier General Beaumont Buck, commanding officer of 2nd Brigade, for use in the attack on Berzy-le-Sec. The attack was scheduled for 2:00 pm.

The Moroccan 1st Division attacked late in the morning before the barrage for the attack on Berzy-le-Sec got under way. The 1st Brigade of the American 1st Division moved with them. Both advances met with little resistance until they started down the bluff, at the bottom of which was the railroad. The Moroccans managed to push some units across the railroad and ended the day with their line slanted west and south of Berzy-le-Sec. 1st Brigade, 1st Division, managed to move parts of two battalions of 16th Infantry east of the railroad stopping about 600 yd (550 m) southwest of Aconin Farm. Elements of 18th Infantry, operating on the division's southern boundary, organized themselves along the railroad tracks several hundred yards/meters northeast of the Bois de Maubuée.

During the night of 19/20 July divisional artillery had been moved to forward positions to assist in the attack. The plan called for a light supporting barrage to mark a line for the troops. Colonel Conrad Babcock protested to Buck that without a heavy barrage his troops would sustain heavy losses crossing flat, open ground under heavy artillery and enfilading machine-gun fire. However, the plan was not altered.

1st Lieutenant Soren C. Sorenson was put in charge of three 6-man infiltration squads. Attacking behind the 2:00 pm barrage, they tried to enter Berzy-le-Sec by going through the trees bordering Ploisy Ravine and entering the town from the north. They reached the outskirts of Berzy-le-Sec, but withering machine gun fire made it impractical to enter the town until after dark. At the same time a battalion of the 26th Infantry followed the barrage and attacked due east from the ravine bluff south of town. This attack quickly foundered due to devastating German artillery fire.

Babcock arranged with Buck to make a night infiltration. This was subsequently canceled at around 11:00 pm because an intense artillery barrage was scheduled for 4:45 am and there was no way to signal division HQ if the town was captured. As a result, Sorenson and his men were ordered to fall back to Ploisy while the 28th Infantry dug in for the night.

Although Berzy-le-Sec was not taken on 20 July, records of the German 65th Infantry Brigade reported the town was not in German hands at 11:00 am. Diagrams accompanying the report show defending units east of the town and west of the railroad and highway. Yet neither French nor American troops reported getting anywhere near the town that morning and 28th Infantry did not attack until 2:00 pm. Late in the afternoon Mangin, Bullard and Pershing arrived and insisted on the necessity of capturing Berzy-le-Sec. Orders were issued to renew the attack the next morning. The orders also indicated that the American 1st Division would be relieved by the Scottish 15th Division after the attack was successfully completed.

Further south, 1st Brigade was still west of the Soissons – Château-Thierry road, straddled the ravine carrying the railroad southwest. They reached the vicinity of Bois Gérard, Visigneux, and Aconin Farm then bent its flank on an east–west line to stay in touch with 2nd Brigade. The Moroccans also crossed the railroad and entered Bois Gérard. They were relieved on the night of 20/21 July by the French 87th Division. On XX Corps' southern flank the French 58th Division completed its relief of the American 2nd Division and planned its attack for 21 July.

=== Day 4: Sunday, 21 July 1918 ===
During the night of 20/21 July, the Moroccan 1st Division was relieved by the French 87th Division on the right flank of 1st Brigade, 1st Division. A regiment of the French 69th Division was pushed forward to reinforce the French 153rd Division. This was done to advance their attack to protect the left flank of 2nd Brigade, 1st Division as they attacked Berzy-le-Sec.

The American 1st Division attack plan for 21 July was the same as the one for the previous day with the addition of a rolling barrage commencing at 4:45 am, with the attacking forces following. However, the attack was complicated by the commander of the French 69th Division. He declared his inability to attack at so early an hour and demanded a three-hour artillery preparation. This meant that the American 1st Division had to maintain liaison with the French 87th Division which was attacking at 4:45 am and the French 153rd Division which would attack at 8:30 am. In order to address this situation, 1st Brigade was sent forward in liaison with the French 87th Division. In addition they retired their left to protect their flank which was also covered by intense supporting artillery fire.

Buck spent the night of 20/21 July going from shell hole to fox hole along the front line to explain the attack order for that day. Each commander was given a copy of a sketch map outlining the area of attack. The attack was to be made in three waves with the first wave to be led by Sorenson and the second wave following in support. The third wave was made up mostly of machine gunners who were directed to set up at the edge of Ploisy Ravine. While Buck was explaining the attack orders to his commanders, the Germans were reinforcing their position with the German 46th Division.

To the south, a heavy artillery preparation beginning at 4:30 am preceded the ground attack of the French 87th Division at 6:00 am. By 6:45 am the Germans were driven across the Soissons – Château-Thierry road south of Villemontoire. Short-firing artillery hampered the German defenses and counterattacks as Buzancy changed hands several times during the day. The German 5th Division arrived mid-afternoon with orders to retake the high ground east of Charentigny. While the attack failed to accomplish the objective, the German 5th Division managed to wrest control of Buzancy from the French for the remainder of the day.

Buck assigned 28th Infantry with the task of taking Berzy-le-Sec and advancing to the center of the ravine east of town. 26th Infantry was given the task of taking the Sucrerie (sugar factory). For the 28th Infantry the center of the ravine would be the railroad station while the Sucrerie was well east of the railroad and the Soissons – Château-Thierry road. This would place Berzy-le-Sec firmly in control of the Allies with a view of Soissons due north.

A few minutes before the attack began, German artillery opened up with a counter-barrage. Sorenson was struck in the left hip by a shell fragment while going over the attack plan with Buck one last time. Sorenson had to be carried away and Buck placed the first wave under Lieutenant John R.D. Cleland Sr. who was next in command. Lieutenant James H. Donaldson led Company B on the left flank and Lieutenant Bill Warren led Company D on the right flank.

A fire for destruction preparation was supposed to be laid on Berzy-le-Sec beginning at 5:30 am but the barrage never happened. The rolling barrage which was planned for 8:30 am was ten minutes late in arriving and the attack commenced without it. As the first wave made its way across the wheat fields, German artillery and machine guns opened up on them.

Before reaching the village the assault paused. Buck, who was watching the attack from the edge of Ploisy Ravine, rushed forward to see what was holding them up. Before he could reach them the assault resumed. He found out later that Cleland had been wounded but refused to be evacuated. Looking back to the edge of the ravine, Buck noticed that the 2nd wave was lagging far behind and rushed back to start them forward. Buck recalled “they were perfectly willing but nobody had given them any command to move out.” Moving on his command, Buck then gathered up those that were left, mostly machine-gunners, and directed them to the edge of the ravine where they set up.

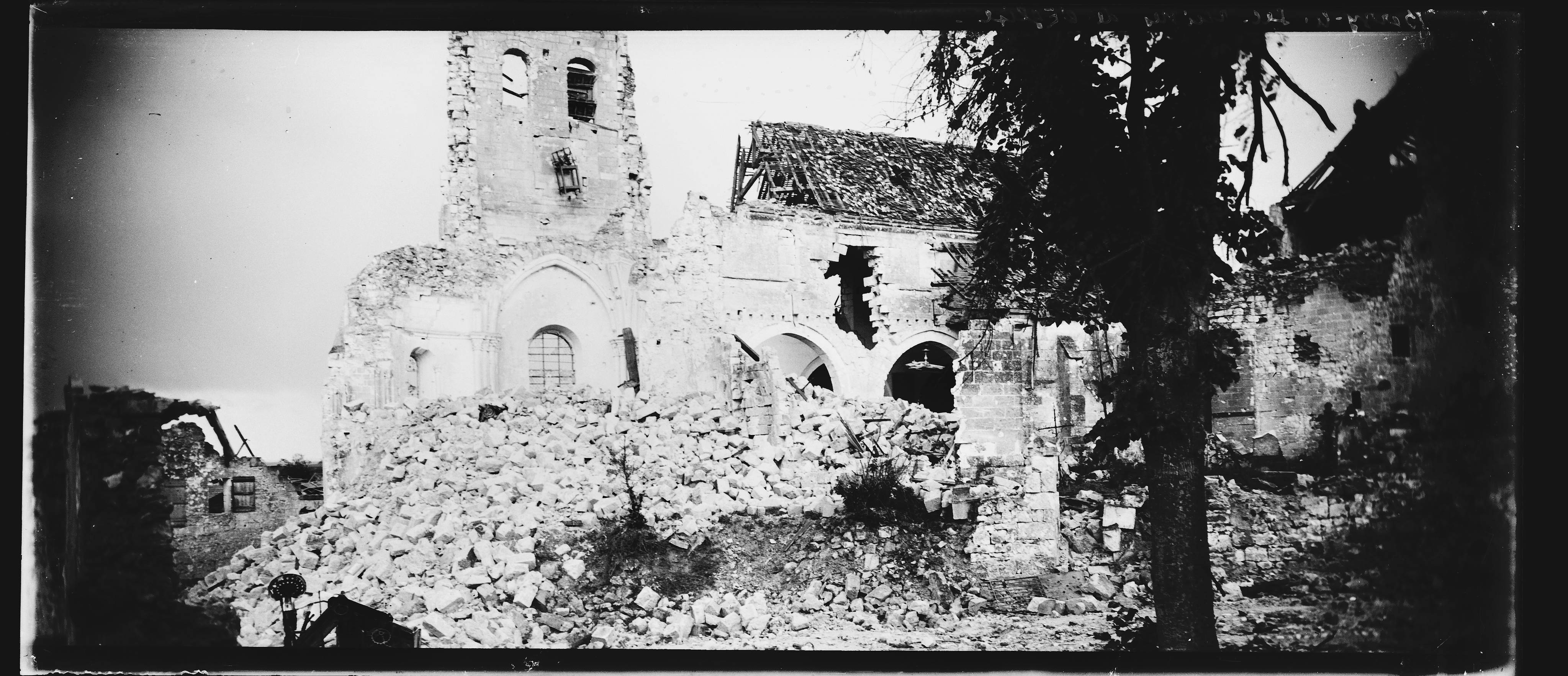
Ruins of the church of Berzy-le-Sec in 1918. Photograph by Raoul Berthele, Archive of Toulouse.

As the assault line approached Berzy-le-Sec, enemy artillery fire increased in intensity. The first wave pressed forward into a hail of machine-gun and rifle fire from well protected emplacements within the town. A battery of German 77s fired point blank at the attackers but the assault line never broke. By 9:15 am, 2nd Brigade had taken Berzy-le-Sec with the Germans retreating across the Crise River. 2nd Brigade pursued the fleeing Germans but stopped at the western bank of the Crise River. By 10:15 am, they were in control of the railroad and had achieved their final objective.

The left flank of the 2nd Brigade line extended to where the French 153rd Division was supposed to be but they had not advanced that far. The Germans had 28th Infantry pinned down with enfilading fire from their exposed left flank and long range machine-gun fire from the hills beyond the Crise River.

After Berzy-le-Sec was taken, Buck learned that the 26th Infantry advance on the Sucrerie had been stymied and Colonel Hamilton Smith, commanding 26th Infantry, demanded 2nd Brigade reserve to assist in the assault. However, even with their assistance, 1st Brigade was unable to seize control of the Sucrerie. By the end of the day the 2nd Brigade line ran from the heights north of Berzy-le-Sec, along the Soissons – Château-Thierry road south of the Sucrerie while 1st Brigade pushed east of the road stopping in the woods west of Buzancy Château.

=== Day 5: Monday, 22 July 1918 ===
Because the Scottish 15th Division was not in position to relieve the American 1st Division during the evening of 21/22 July, 1st Division remained in the line on 22 July. Although there was no significant fighting, 26th Infantry found it necessary to advance its line east of the Sucrerie in order to eliminate sniper fire coming from the factory and to straighten the line at the front. Liaison was maintained with the French 153rd Division on the left and the French 87th Division on the right. The line on the right of the American 1st Division remained north and west of Buzancy as they were unable to take the town.

Priority was given to removing the wounded from the field and burying the dead. German aircraft spent the day flying low and strafing available targets. German artillery was active in shelling the front lines as well as firing counter-battery missions. During the afternoon, advance parties from the French and British relief forces arrived in Berzy-le-Sec to plan the relief for that night.

During the night of 22/23 July the Scottish 15th Division and the remainder of the French 69th Division moved forward to relieve what was left of the American 1st Division.

== Conclusion ==
At dawn on 23 July, the Scottish 15th Division continued the attack eastward. The artillery of the American 1st Division remained in place for support. Due to difficulty locating the infantry front line the rolling barrage was too far advanced to offer sufficient protection to the assaulting troops. Suffering heavy casualties, the Scottish 15th Division made little progress.

With their primary supply route to the Marne Salient cut and the rail hub in Soissons within range of Allied artillery, the Germans would be hard pressed to maintain their armies within the salient. Faced with the prospect of having their forces in the Marne Salient trapped the Germans had little choice but to give up their gains.

After stubborn German resistance and ferocious fighting, Soissons eventually fell to the Allies on 2 August 1918. When the Aisne-Marne campaign officially ended on 6 August 1918, the front ran on a straight line along the Vesle River from Soissons to Reims.

However, by the evening of 22/23 July 1918 the Allies had already achieved a decisive victory. Operation Hagen, a 39-division attack against the British sector, was cancelled on 21 July. The follow-up offensive, Operation Kursfürst, was supposed to follow Hagen with a drive to Paris but never got beyond the preliminary planning stage. Germany never regained the initiative and would be on the defensive until the end of the war.

== Monuments ==
=== Oise-Aisne American Cemetery ===
The Oise-Aisne Cemetery is the second largest American World War I Cemetery in Europe containing 6,012 graves. The 36.5-acre site is located near Fère-en-Tardenois in the village of Seringes-et-Nesles. The headstones are aligned in long rows rising on a gentle slope from the entrance to the memorial at the far end. The cemetery is divided into four plots by wide paths lined by trees and beds of roses. At the intersection is a circular plaza and the flagpole.

The memorial is a curving colonnade flanked at the ends by a chapel and a map room. It is made of rose-colored sandstone with white trim. The chapel contains an altar of carved stone. The Walls of the Missing contains the engraved names of 241 soldiers. Rosettes mark the names of individuals since recovered and identified. The map room contains an engraved wall map outlining the military operations in the region during 1918.

Sgt. Joyce Kilmer, a noted American poet, is buried here. He was shot in the head by a sniper on 30 July 1918 after volunteering to accompany Major "Wild Bill" Donovan when Donovan's battalion was sent to lead the day's attack. He died near Muercy Farm which is across the road and stream from the Oise-Aisne Cemetery.

=== 1st Division Battlefield Monument ===
The 1st Division Battlefield Monument was erected by the 1st Division. It is located west of Buzancy on the Soissons – Château-Thiery road. The monument consists of a concrete plinth containing the names of the dead engraved on bronze plates. The plinth is surmounted by an eagle carved of stone atop a pedestal. On the pedestal is a wreathed replica of the 1st Division shoulder sleeve insignia.

=== 2nd Division Battlefield Marker ===
The 2nd Division Battlefield Marker is near the Soissons–Paris road about 1 mi (1.6 km) west of Beaurepaire Farm. The marker is a concrete boulder about 3 ft (0.91 m) in diameter with the 2nd Division insignia engraved in bronze upon it.[198] [199] In close proximity is an additional marker indicating the farthest advance of the German Army in 1918. The 2nd Division jump-off line was at right angles to the road near the location of the marker.
