= 102nd Division =

In military terms, 102nd Division or 102nd Infantry Division may refer to:

- 102nd Division (1st Formation) (People's Republic of China), 1949–1950
- 102nd Division (2nd Formation) (People's Republic of China), 1950–1955
- 102nd Fortress Division (France)
- 102nd Infantry Division (Wehrmacht), Germany
- 102nd Motorized Division "Trento", Italian Army, World War II
- 102nd Division (Imperial Japanese Army), Thirty-Fifth Army
- 102nd Division (Philippines)
- 102nd Guards Rifle Division, Soviet Union
- 102nd Motor Rifle Division, Soviet Union
- 102nd Rifle Division, Soviet union
- 102nd Training Division, United States, formerly the 102nd Infantry Division ("Ozark")

== See also ==
- List of military divisions by number
- 102nd Brigade (disambiguation)
- 102nd Regiment (disambiguation)
- 102nd Squadron (disambiguation)
- 102nd (disambiguation)
