= 102nd Regiment of Foot =

102nd Regiment of Foot may refer to:

- 102nd Regiment of Foot (Royal Madras Fusiliers) raised by the East India Company in 1742 and absorbed by the British Army in 1862
- 102nd Regiment of Foot (Queen's Royal Volunteers), raised in 1760
- 102nd Regiment of Foot (1781), raised in 1781
- 102nd Regiment of Foot (Irish Rangers), raised in 1794
- 102nd Regiment of Foot, or New South Wales Corps, raised in 1789

== See also ==
- 102nd Regiment (disambiguation)
