= 102nd =

102nd is the ordinal form of the number 102. 102nd or One hundred and second may also refer to:

- A fraction, 1/102, equal to one of 102 equal parts

== Geography ==
- 102nd meridian east, a line of longitude
- 102nd meridian west, a line of longitude

== Military ==
- 102nd Brigade (disambiguation)
- 102nd Division (disambiguation)
- 102nd Regiment (disambiguation)

== See also ==
- April 12, 102nd day of the year in a standard year
