= 102nd Brigade =

In military terms, 102nd Brigade may refer to:

== Germany ==
- 102nd Panzer Brigade

== South Korea ==
- 102nd Armored Brigade

== Ukraine ==
- 102nd Territorial Defense Brigade, a unit of the Ukrainian Territorial Defense Forces

== United Kingdom ==
- 102nd (Tyneside Scottish) Brigade, a British infantry formation during World War I
- 102nd Brigade, Royal Field Artillery, a British Army unit during World War I
- 102nd (Pembroke and Cardigan) Brigade, Royal Field Artillery, a British Army unit after World War I
- 102nd Anti-Aircraft Brigade (United Kingdom), British Army formation during World War II
- 102 Operational Sustainment Brigade

== See also ==
- 102nd Division (disambiguation)
- 102nd Regiment (disambiguation)
