= List of French divisions in World War I =

This page is a list of French divisions that existed during the First World War. Divisions were either infantry, colonial infantry or cavalry.

== Infantry ==
- 1st Infantry Division
- 2nd Infantry Division
- 3rd Infantry Division
- 4th Infantry Division
- 5th Infantry Division
- 6th Infantry Division
- 7th Infantry Division
- 8th Infantry Division
- 9th Infantry Division
- 10th Infantry Division
- 11th Infantry Division
- 12th Infantry Division
- 13th Infantry Division
- 14th Infantry Division
- 15th Infantry Division
- 16th Infantry Division
- 17th Infantry Division
- 18th Infantry Division
- 19th Infantry Division
- 20th Infantry Division
- 21st Infantry Division
- 22nd Infantry Division
- 23rd Infantry Division
- 24th Infantry Division
- 25th Infantry Division
- 26th Infantry Division
- 27th Infantry Division
- 28th Infantry Division
- 29th Infantry Division
- 30th Infantry Division
- 31st Infantry Division
- 32nd Infantry Division
- 33rd Infantry Division
- 34th Infantry Division
- 35th Infantry Division
- 36th Infantry Division
- 37th Infantry Division
- 38th Infantry Division
- 39th Infantry Division
- 41st Infantry Division
- 42nd Infantry Division
- 43rd Infantry Division
- 44th Infantry Division
- 45th Infantry Division
- 46th Infantry Division
- 47th Infantry Division
- 48th Infantry Division
- 51st Infantry Division
- 52nd Infantry Division
- 53rd Infantry Division
- 55th Infantry Division
- 56th Infantry Division
- 57th Infantry Division
- 58th Infantry Division
- 60th Infantry Division
- 61st Infantry Division
- 62nd Infantry Division
- 63rd Infantry Division
- 64th Infantry Division
- 65th Infantry Division
- 66th Infantry Division
- 67th Infantry Division
- 68th Infantry Division
- 69th Infantry Division
- 70th Infantry Division
- 71st Infantry Division
- 72nd Infantry Division
- 74th Infantry Division
- 75th Infantry Division
- 76th Infantry Division
- 77th Infantry Division
- 81st Territorial Infantry Division
- 81st Infantry Division
- 82nd Territorial Infantry Division
- 83rd Territorial Infantry Division
- 84th Territorial Infantry Division
- 85th Territorial Infantry Division
- 86th Territorial Infantry Division
- 87th Territorial Infantry Division
- 87th Infantry Division
- 88th Territorial Infantry Division
- 88th Infantry Division
- 89th Territorial Infantry Division
- 90th Territorial Infantry Division
- 91st Territorial Infantry Division
- 92nd Territorial Infantry Division
- 94th Territorial Infantry Division
- 96th Territorial Infantry Division
- 97th Infantry Division
- 97th Territorial Infantry Division
- 99th Territorial Infantry Division
- 100th Territorial Infantry Division
- 101st Territorial Infantry Division
- 102nd Territorial Infantry Division
- 103rd Territorial Infantry Division
- 104th Territorial Infantry Division
- 105th Territorial Infantry Division
- 120th Infantry Division
- 121st Infantry Division
- 122nd Infantry Division
- 123rd Infantry Division
- 125th Infantry Division
- 126th Infantry Division
- 127th Infantry Division
- 128th Infantry Division
- 129th Infantry Division
- 130th Infantry Division
- 132nd Infantry Division
- 133rd Infantry Division
- 152nd Infantry Division
- 153rd Infantry Division
- 156th Infantry Division
- 157th Infantry Division
- 158th Infantry Division
- 164th Infantry Division
- 165th Infantry Division
- 166th Infantry Division
- 169th Infantry Division
- 170th Infantry Division

== Cavalry ==
- 1st Cavalry Division
- 1st Foot Cavalry Division
- 2nd Cavalry Division
- 2nd Foot Cavalry Division
- 3rd Cavalry Division
- 4th Cavalry Division
- 5th Cavalry Division
- 6th Cavalry Division
- 7th Cavalry Division
- 8th Cavalry Division
- 9th Cavalry Division
- 10th Cavalry Division

== Colonial ==
- Moroccan Division
- 2nd Moroccan Division
- 2nd Colonial Infantry Division
- 3rd Colonial Infantry Division
- 10th Colonial Infantry Division
- 11th Colonial Infantry Division
- 15th Colonial Infantry Division
- 16th Colonial Infantry Division
- 17th Colonial Infantry Division

== Bibliography ==
- Les Armées françaises dans la Grande guerre [French Armies in the Great War] (in French). Vol. X-2 : Ordres de bataille des grandes unités : divisions d'infanterie, divisions de cavalerie. Paris: Impr. nationale. 1924.

== See also ==
- French Army order of battle (1914)
- Order of battle of the First Battle of the Marne
- First Battle of Ypres order of battle
- Order of battle for the Battle of the Somme
- List of forces involved in the Battle of Amiens
- List of French divisions in World War II
