= Villers-Hélon =

- Commune
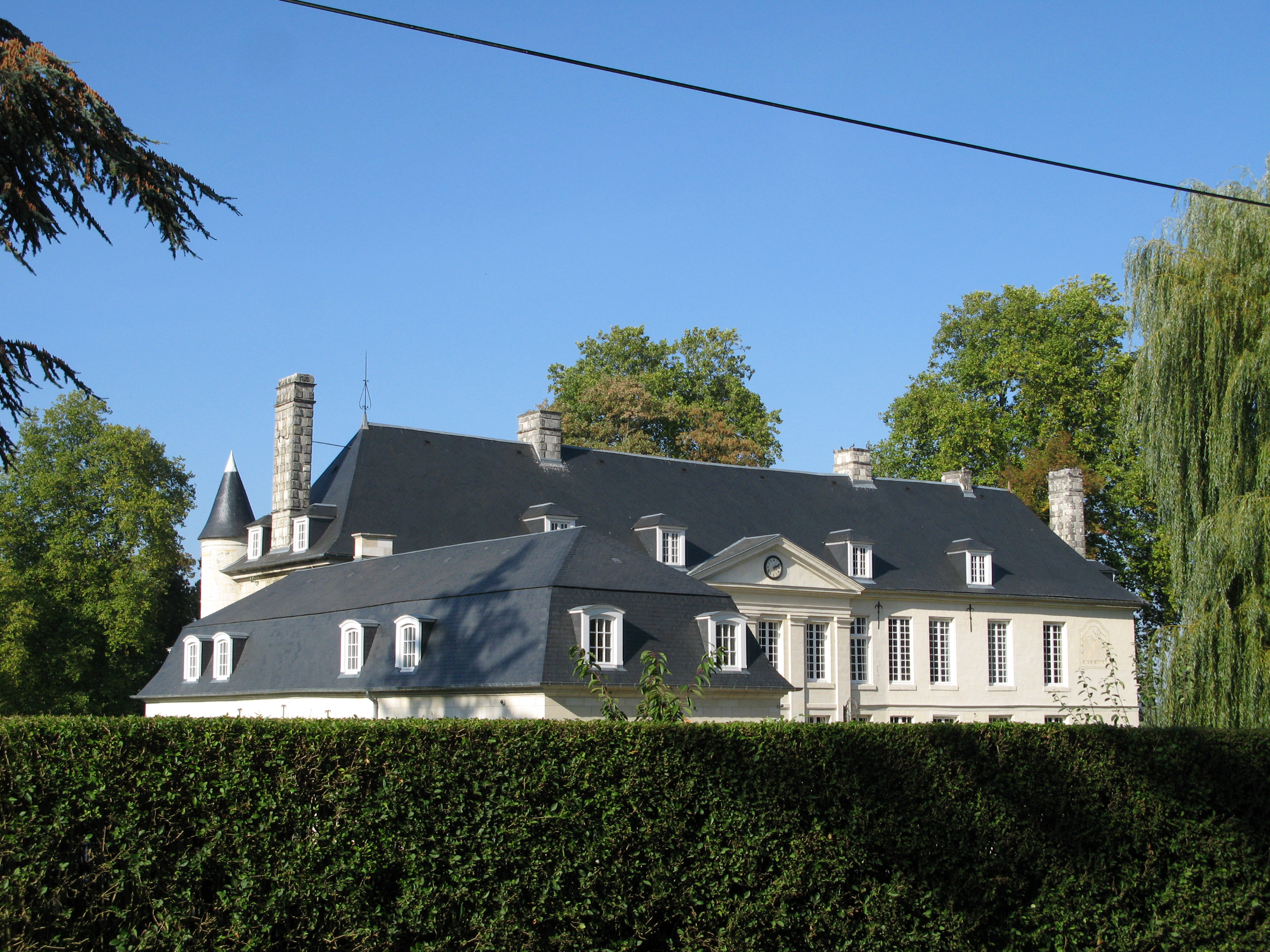
- Chateau
- Location of Villers-Hélon
- Location within France Location within Hauts-de-France
- Coordinates: 49°15′51″N 3°15′46″E
- Country: France
- Region: Hauts-de-France
- Department: Aisne
- Arrondissement: Soissons
- Canton: Villers-Cotterêts

Government
  - Mayor (2026–32): Sylvie Collin
- Area^{1}: 8.07 km^{2} (3.12 sq mi)
- Elevation: 165 m (541 ft)
- Highest elevation: 193 m (633 ft)
- Lowest elevation: 85 m (279 ft)
- Population (2023): 193
  - Density: 23.9/km^{2} (61.9/sq mi)
- Time zone: UTC+01:00 (CET)
  - Summer (DST): UTC+02:00 (CEST)
- INSEE/Postal code: 02812 /02600
- ^{1} French Land Register data, which excludes lakes, ponds, glaciers > 1 km^{2} (0.386 sq mi or 247 acres) and river estuaries.

Villers-Hélon (French pronunciation: [vilɛʁ elɔ̃]) is a commune in the Aisne department in Hauts-de-France in northern France.

== History ==
=== Foundation and development ===
According to local historical accounts, the village and parish of Villers-Hélon were founded in 1135 by a local lord named Hélon de Villers. From the 13th century onwards, the settlement adopted the name associated with its founder.

The village developed between its church and château, on the southern slope of the valley of the Savière, a watercourse that formerly supplied two mills.

=== Architectural heritage ===
The church of Saint-Martin was constructed in stages between the 12th and 15th centuries. Its architectural features include a massive square bell tower, a Romanesque nave and a choir. The church also contains five tombstones belonging to former local lords, dating from the 16th and 18th centuries.

The château, situated on the opposite side of the village, dates back to the medieval period and underwent several alterations under successive owners.

== Population ==
Historical population
| Year | Pop. | ±% p.a. |
|---|---|---|
| 1968 | 175 | — |
| 1975 | 146 | −2.56% |
| 1982 | 148 | +0.19% |
| 1990 | 173 | +1.97% |
| 1999 | 188 | +0.93% |
| 2007 | 210 | +1.39% |
| 2012 | 228 | +1.66% |
| 2017 | 217 | −0.98% |
| 2023 | 193 | −1.93% |
Source: INSEE

== See also ==
- Communes of the Aisne department
