= Hartennes-et-Taux =

- Commune
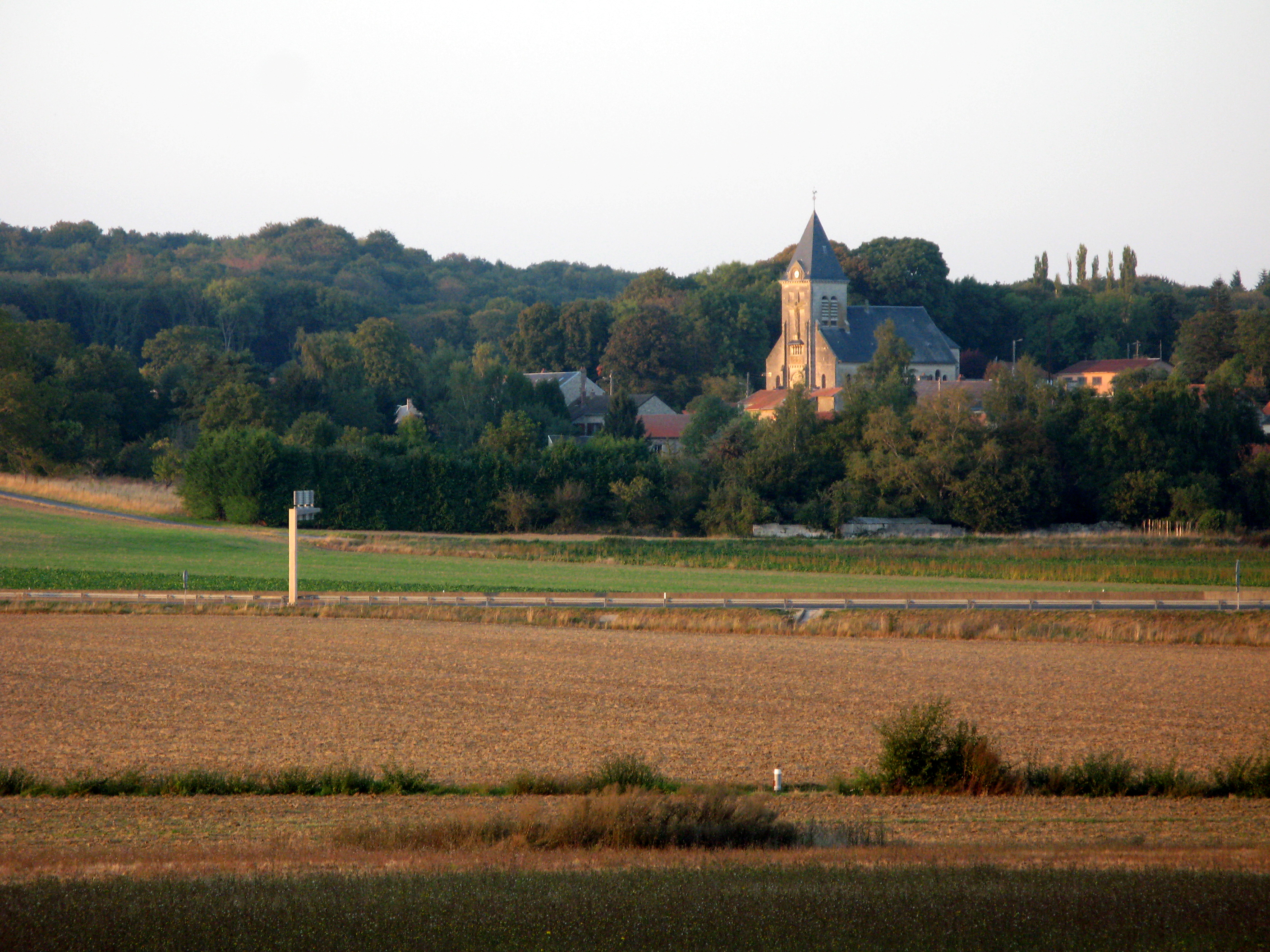
- A general view of Hartennes-et-Taux
- Location of Hartennes-et-Taux
- Location within France Location within Hauts-de-France
- Coordinates: 49°16′20″N 3°21′13″E
- Country: France
- Region: Hauts-de-France
- Department: Aisne
- Arrondissement: Soissons
- Canton: Villers-Cotterêts
- Intercommunality: Oulchy le Château

Government
  - Mayor (2026–32): Christine Wokan
- Area^{1}: 6.31 km^{2} (2.44 sq mi)
- Elevation: 160 m (520 ft)
- Highest elevation: 196 m (643 ft)
- Lowest elevation: 86 m (282 ft)
- Population (2023): 343
  - Density: 54.4/km^{2} (141/sq mi)
- Time zone: UTC+01:00 (CET)
  - Summer (DST): UTC+02:00 (CEST)
- INSEE/Postal code: 02372 /02210
- ^{1} French Land Register data, which excludes lakes, ponds, glaciers > 1 km^{2} (0.386 sq mi or 247 acres) and river estuaries.

Hartennes-et-Taux (French pronunciation: [aʁtɛn e to]) is a commune in the Aisne department in Hauts-de-France in northern France.

== Population ==
Historical population
| Year | Pop. | ±% p.a. |
|---|---|---|
| 1968 | 272 | — |
| 1975 | 305 | +1.65% |
| 1982 | 317 | +0.55% |
| 1990 | 355 | +1.43% |
| 1999 | 359 | +0.12% |
| 2007 | 337 | −0.79% |
| 2012 | 366 | +1.66% |
| 2017 | 371 | +0.27% |
| 2023 | 343 | −1.30% |
Source: INSEE

== See also ==
- Communes of the Aisne department
