= Buzancy, Aisne =

Buzancy
- Commune
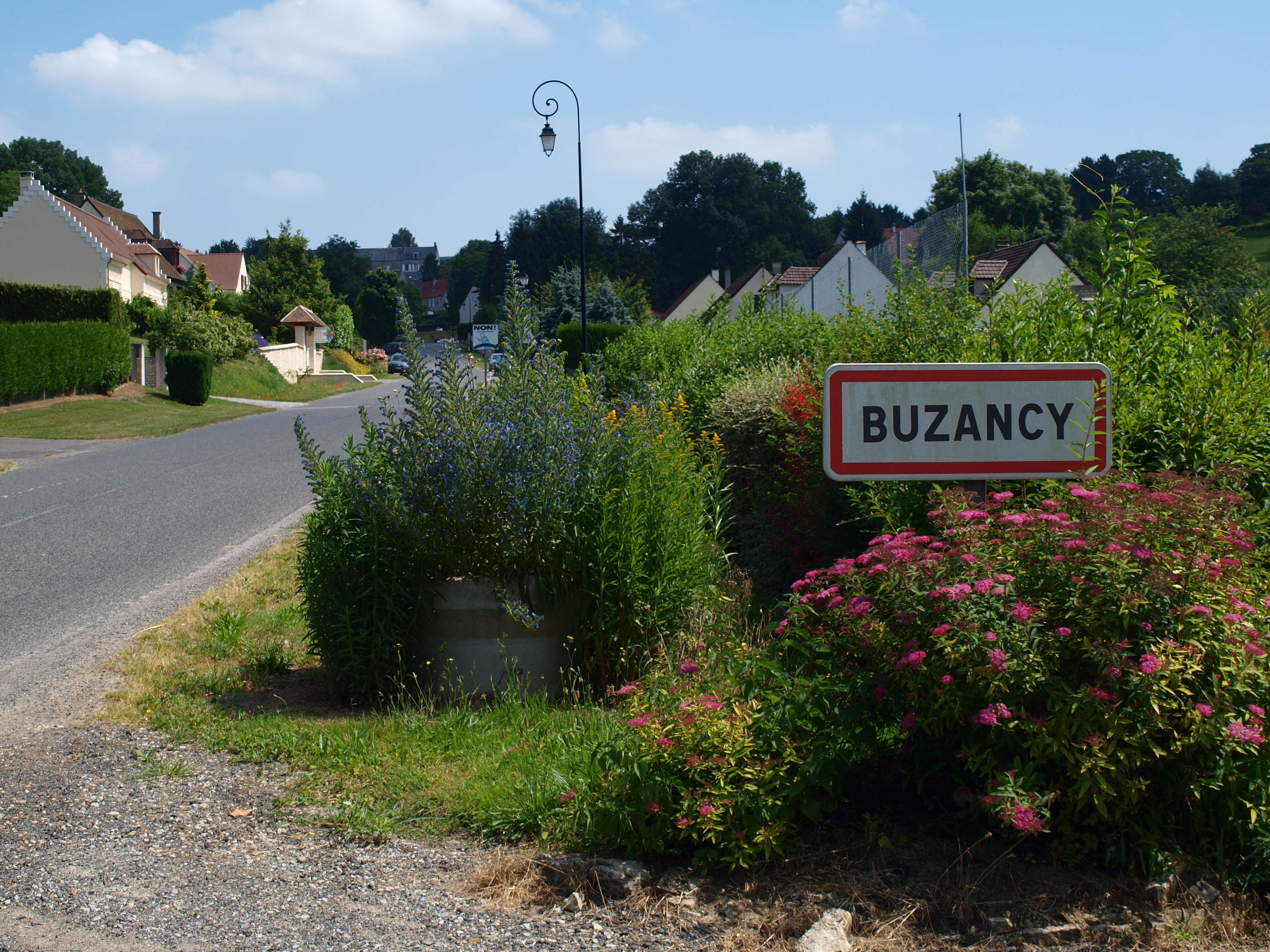
- The road into Buzancy
- Location of Buzancy
- Location within France Location within Hauts-de-France
- Coordinates: 49°18′52″N 3°20′54″E
- Country: France
- Region: Hauts-de-France
- Department: Aisne
- Arrondissement: Soissons
- Canton: Villers-Cotterêts
- Intercommunality: Oulchy le Château

Government
  - Mayor (2026–32): Denis Poncelet
- Area^{1}: 4.75 km^{2} (1.83 sq mi)
- Elevation: 124 m (407 ft)
- Highest elevation: 153 m (502 ft)
- Lowest elevation: 62 m (203 ft)
- Population (2023): 175
  - Density: 36.8/km^{2} (95.4/sq mi)
- Time zone: UTC+01:00 (CET)
  - Summer (DST): UTC+02:00 (CEST)
- INSEE/Postal code: 02138 /02200
- ^{1} French Land Register data, which excludes lakes, ponds, glaciers > 1 km^{2} (0.386 sq mi or 247 acres) and river estuaries.

Buzancy (French pronunciation: [byzɑ̃si]) is a commune in the department of Aisne in Hauts-de-France in northern France.

== History ==
Buzancy (Buzenciacus). Village of the former region of the Soissonnais, situated on high ground above a narrow valley 10 km south of Soissons. The first mention of Buzancy is in the 9th century. In the 11th century, it belonged to the lords of Pierrefonds who gave it to one of their junior branches. Buzancy became a county seat from then on, and a castle was constructed, of which a tower still remains. The current chateau is that of the former fiefdom of Grandcourt. The church of Buzancy, dedicated to St. Martin, was once the destination of a well-travelled pilgrimage, people going there to cure a sore throat.

== Population ==
Historical population
Year	Pop.	±% p.a.
1968	131	—
1975	121	−1.13%
1982	183	+6.09%
1990	188	+0.34%
1999	169	−1.18%
2007	179	+0.72%
2012	186	+0.77%
2017	190	+0.43%
2023	175	−1.36%
Source: INSEE

== Significant events ==
At the end of May 1918, the Imperial German Army's attempt to strike for Paris in the Third Battle of the Aisne swept over Soissons and its hinterland, including Buzancy. Eventually checked by the resistance of various Allied forces, the advance nevertheless left a threatening salient between Soissons and Rheims. Realising the opportunity for a decisive victory by "pinching-off" the salient, the Allied supremo General Foch ordered a counteroffensive across its "neck" from both sides, commencing very successfully on the Soissons side on 18 July 1918, assisted very effectively by Renault FT light tanks. The Germans, realising the enormity of what was at stake, defended the two strategic hinges of the salient with utmost determination in order to win sufficient time to withdraw the remainder of their forces from within the (shrinking) pocket.

The initial thrust towards Buzancy was entrusted to the already heavily-committed US 1st Division, to whose memory a monument now stands prominently by the side of the D1 Château-Thierry to Soissons main road near the turn-off up to the village. The battle-weary American infantry were relieved in some haste and confusion during the night of 22/23 July by the 15th (Scottish) Division, one of the four divisions of the British XXII Corps which a few days previously had been rushed to the salient as insurance against a German breakthrough to Paris. (The first task of the division was to bury the many American dead still lying in swathes in the cornfields where they had fallen.) The Corps command itself moving further south, the 15th and 34th divisions came under direct French Army command. Supported by US 1st Division heavy artillery pending arrival of their own, the 15th Division's first attack northwards of Buzancy in the coming dawn was poorly co-ordinated, suffered badly from unsuppressed machine-gun fire, and had only limited success.

After a move sideways to directly face Buzancy, shortly after noon on 28 July 1918, the Scots, accompanied by a French flamethrower section, and with the support of French heavy artillery in addition to their own, launched a surprise attack eastwards up the slope towards the chateau and the village itself, in conjunction with French forces to its right. Fierce hand-to-hand fighting around the chateau and through the narrow, sloping streets ensued, the attackers of the former having to scale its boundary walls on the shoulders of their comrades. Unfortunately, the Division's rapid advance left its flanks mercilessly exposed, the French being unable to make similar progress. As the afternoon progressed, a strong counterattack developed by the German 5th Inf. and 50th Res. divisions, and the Scots found themselves slowly being forced to give up their hard-won positions, and by the evening had made a fighting retreat back to where they had started. A few days later the Germans withdrew, their salient having been completely reduced.

As an example of the grim nature of the battle, two bodies were found in one street locked together, one of a German officer with revolver in his hand, the other of his victim, a Scottish soldier clutching his rifle with bayonet which he had run through his opponent's body.

The commander of the relieving French division, General C. Gassoins, on establishing his headquarters in Buzancy, seeing the still-fresh aftermath of the attack and receiving reports of what had occurred, was so impressed that he ordered the immediate construction of a memorial to the 15th Division on the position of the soldier's body found furthest forward on the battlefield, in the open fields beyond the village. On its plain granite plinth is sculpted a circular bas-relief showing an intertwined rose and thistle, below which is inscribed (in French):

"Here will flourish for ever
the glorious thistle of Scotland
among the roses of France"

and on the side

The 17th French Infantry Division
to
The 15th Scottish Infantry Division

It was the only monument erected in the field during the First World War by a French unit dedicated to a British one. It was a visible manifestation of the significant resurgence which the various actions at the time of XXII Corps brought about in the French command's faith in the continued fighting ability of its British ally, a faith which had lately been badly shaken by the dramatic British retreat at the start of the German Kaiserschlacht offensive.

The monument was later removed from the position near the crest of the ridge where first erected and placed in the care of the Commonwealth War Graves Commission within the precincts of the military cemetery on the western edge of the village, where those of the 15th (Scottish) Division who fell in the action are interred.

== See also ==
- Communes of the Aisne department
