= 102nd Squadron =

102nd Squadron may refer to:

- No. 102 Squadron RAF, of the UK's Royal Air Force
- 102 Squadron (Israel), of the Israeli Air Force
- 102nd Squadron (JASDF), of the Japanese Air Self-Defense Force
- 102nd Squadron (Portugal), of the Portuguese Air Force
- No. 102 Squadron RAAF, of the Royal Australian Air Force
- 102nd Rescue Squadron, of the New York Air National Guard
- VFA-102, of the US Navy
