= 102nd Division (1st Formation) (People's Republic of China) =

102nd Division (1949–50)
- Active: 1949.2 - 1950.1
- Country: People's Republic of China
- Branch: People's Liberation Army
- Type: Division
- Role: Infantry
- Part of: 34th Corps
- Engagements: Chinese Civil War

The 102nd Division (Chinese: 第102师)(1st Formation), was created in February 1949 under the Regulation of the Redesignations of All Organizations and Units of the Army, issued by Central Military Commission on November 1, 1948, based on the 34th Brigade of Jianghuai Military District. Its history could be traced to 6th Brigade of New Fourth Army formed in November 1944.

The division was a part of PLA 34th Corps. During the Chinese Civil War it took part in several major battles including the Huaihai Campaign. From April 1949 the division took part in the role of the security of Nanjing city.

In November 1949 the division was transferred to Special Troops Column of Huadong Military Region.

In January 1950 the division was inactivated. Headquarters, 102nd Division was converted to Headquarters, 3rd Artillery Division. Other assets and elements were transferred to the Special Troops Column, 13th Public Security Division and the People's Liberation Army Air Force.

As of its disbandment the division was composed of:

- 304th Regiment;
- 305th Regiment;
- 306th Regiment.
