= 34th Transport Aviation Division =

- Founded: 28 August 1963
- Country: China
- Branch: People's Liberation Army Air Force

The 34th Transport Aviation Division is a formation of the Chinese People's Liberation Army Air Force. It was formed on 28 August 1963 initially with the 100th and 101st Regiments.

Today it is headquartered at Beijing Nanyuan Airport in the Central Theatre Command. It was equipped with Y-7, Y-8, and Il-18 transport aircraft, with the 100th, 101st, and 102nd Regiments.

The formation appears to have been reorganised in 2017, with the 101st, 202nd, and 203rd Regiment transformed into a Transportation and Search and Rescue Brigade, with only the 100th Regiment surviving as part of the division, flying Eurocopter AS332 Super Puma and EC225 helicopters.
