= 102nd Division (2nd Formation) (People's Republic of China) =

102nd Division (1950-52) 4th Agricultural Construction Division (1952-55)
- Active: 1950.10 - 1955.11
- Country: People's Republic of China
- Branch: People's Liberation Army
- Type: Division
- Role: Infantry

The 102nd Division(Chinese: 第102师) (2nd Formation) of the People's Liberation Army in China was organized on October 11, 1950 from the 9th Security Brigade of Huadong Military Region. The division was composed of 3 infantry regiments, 304th Infantry Regiment, 305th Infantry Regiment, 306th Infantry Regiment. In May 1952 the division was reorganized as the 4th Agricultural Construction Division (Chinese: 农业建设第4师) and In November 1955 the division was disbanded.
