= Campbell King =

United States Army general

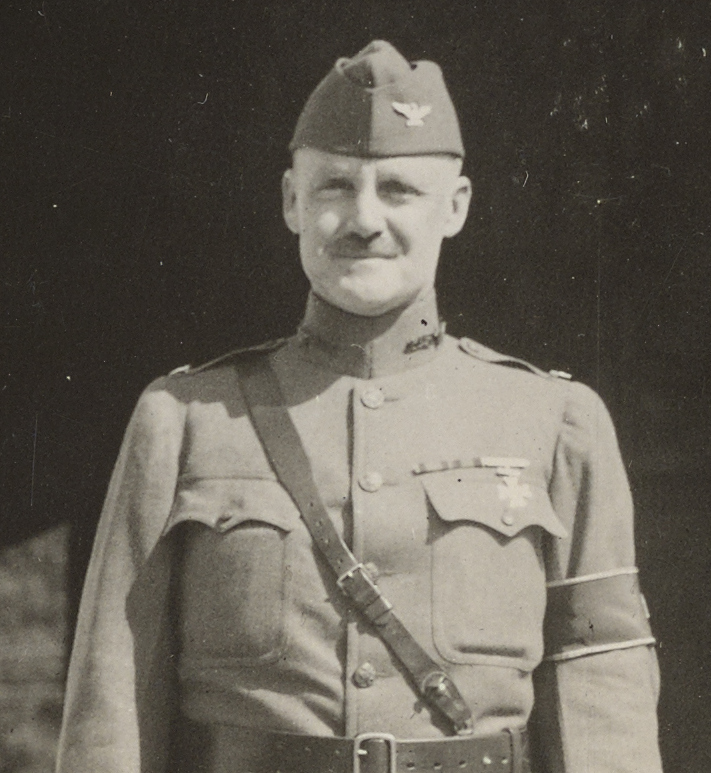
- King as a colonel, April 1918.
- Born: August 30, 1871; Flat Rock, North Carolina
- Died: October 16, 1953 (aged 82); Flat Rock, North Carolina
- Burial place: Church of St. John in the Wilderness, Flat Rock, North Carolina
- Military career
- Allegiance: United States of America
- Branch: United States Army
- Service years: 1897–1933
- Rank: Major General
- Service number: 0-674
- Wars: Boxer Rebellion, World War I
- Awards: Distinguished Service Medal Croix de Guerre with palm and silver star Officer of the Legion of Honour Commander of the Order of the Crown of Italy

Campbell King (30 August 1871 – 16 October 1953) was an American infantry officer who served with the U.S. Army. He was the commandant at Fort Benning and is known for modernizing its training programs and infrastructure.

== Early years ==
Born to Alexander King and Mary Lee Evans King on 30 August 1871, Campbell King grew up in Flat Rock, North Carolina. He attended Charleston High School and the College of Charleston, then was a student at Harvard College from 1889 to 1891. He enlisted in the cavalry as a private in 1897.

== Military career ==
After being promoted to corporal, King was commissioned as an infantry officer in 1898. Some time after his commission, King graduated with distinction from the Infantry and Cavalry School at Fort Leavenworth in 1905, and the Army Staff College the following year in 1906. In 1911, King graduated from the Army War College.

During this time, King was stationed in American territories and on the Mexican border, but he also saw action in China during the Boxer Rebellion.

=== First World War ===
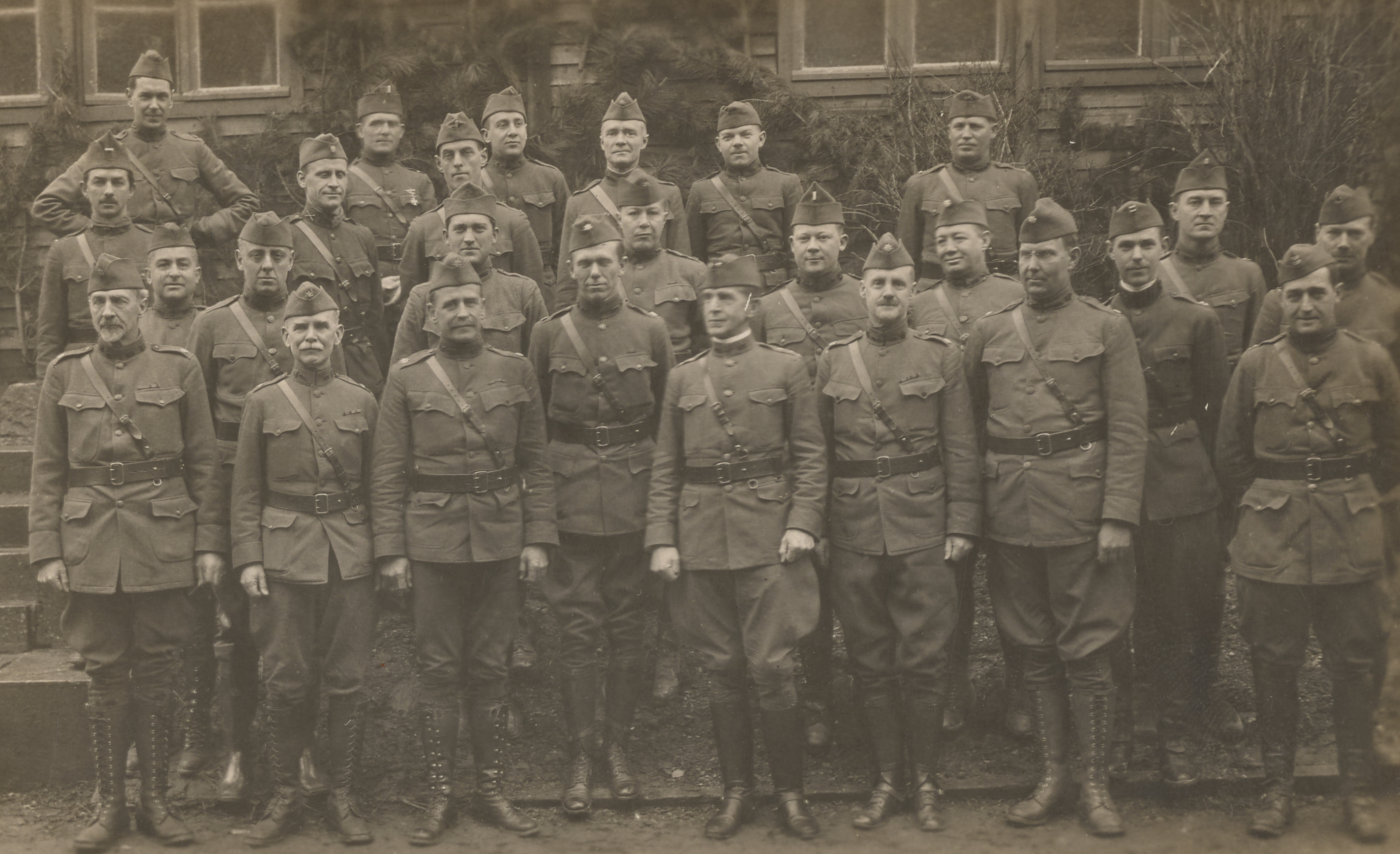
Major General Robert Lee Bullard (center, facing towards the right), the newly appointed commander of the 1st Division, and members of his divisional staff at Gondrecourt, France, January 17, 1918. To Bullard's left is his chief of staff, Lieutenant Colonel Campbell King, while to Bullard's right is Lieutenant Colonel George C. Marshall, the assistant chief of staff for operations.

Following the American entry into World War I, in April 1917, King was assigned to the 1st Division and was appointed the division's chief of staff in December 1917. On 1 October 1918, King was promoted to brigadier general and served as the Chief of Staff of the 7th Army Corps and later the 3rd Army Corps.

As Chief of Staff of the 1st Division, King played a key role coordinating the division's various units in Cantigny and Saint Mihiel.

King emerged from the war decorated with the Army Distinguished Service Medal, the Croix de Guerre, the Legion of Honor and the Order of the Crown. He was the second American to be awarded the French Croix de Guerre, the other being George B. Duncan. The citation for Kin's Army DSM reads:

The President of the United States of America, authorized by Act of Congress, July 9, 1918, takes pleasure in presenting the Army Distinguished Service Medal to Brigadier General Campbell King, United States Army, for exceptionally meritorious and distinguished services to the Government of the United States, in a duty of great responsibility during World War I. General King served with distinction as Chief of Staff of the 1st Division in the operations near Montdidier, the advance south of Soissons, and in the attack on the St. Mihiel salient. Later, as Chief of Staff of the 3d Army Corps during the Meuse-Argonne operation, by his splendid tactical judgment he rendered especially meritorious service.

=== Between the wars ===
In 1920, King graduated from the General Staff College and received an honorary M.A. from Harvard. In July 1924, King was permanently promoted to brigadier general, and in 1925 he was appointed Assistant Chief of Staff, position he would hold until 1929. In May 1929, King took command of the Infantry School at Fort Benning, Georgia. Under his command, and with then-Lieutenant-Colonel George C. Marshall as Assistant Commandant, King ushered in "halcyon days" by modernizing Fort Benning's training programs and infrastructure. He was promoted to major general in 1932 and retired the following year.

== Personal life and death ==
Campbell King married Harriet Laurens King in 1907. Together they had two children, Duncan and Barbara. After his retirement in 1933, Campbell returned to his hometown of Flat Rock, North Carolina, where he died on 16 October 1953.
