= Saconin-et-Breuil =

- Commune
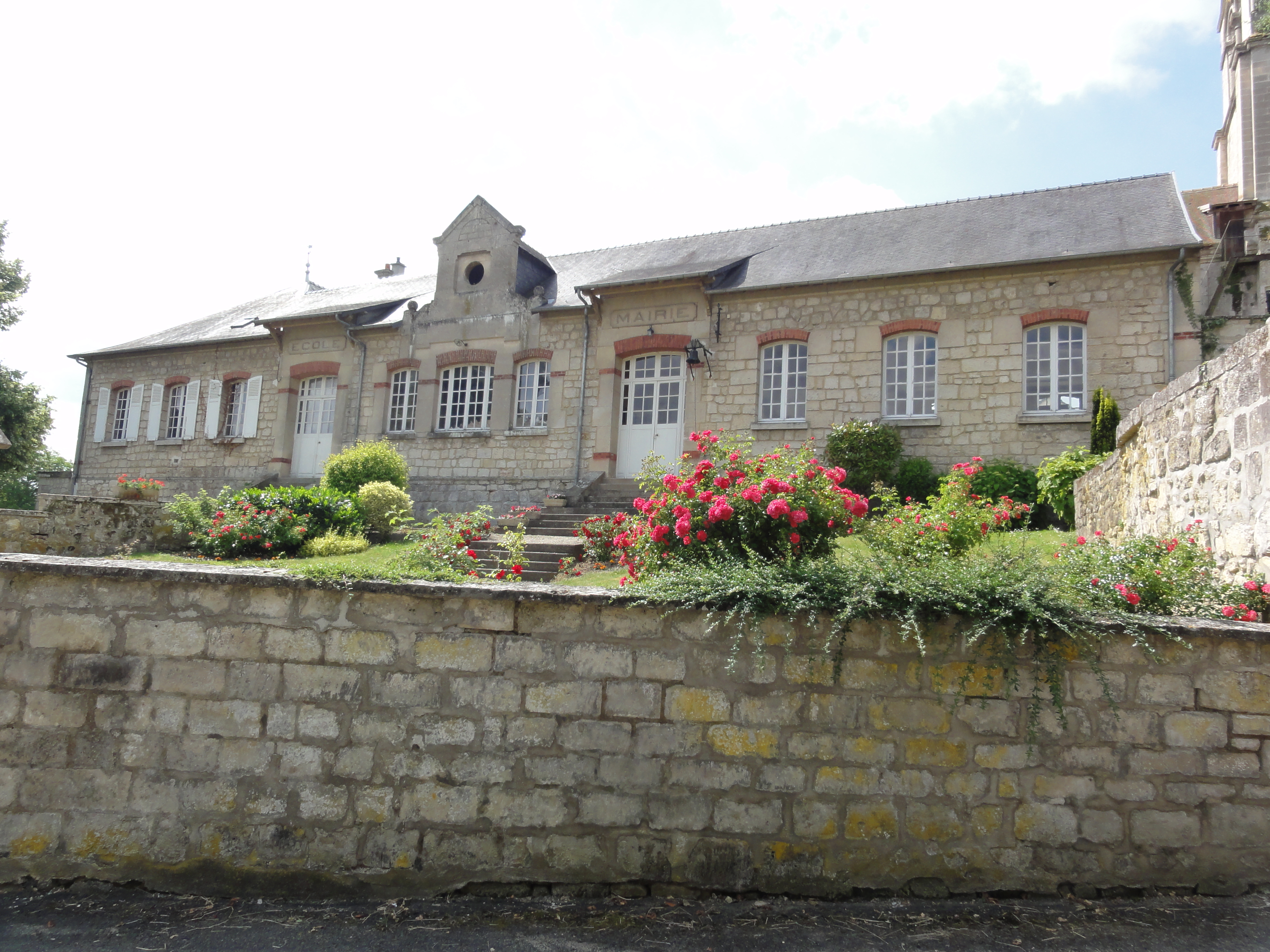
- The town hall and school of Saconin-et-Breuil

- Coat of arms
- Location of Saconin-et-Breuil
- Location within France Location within Hauts-de-France
- Coordinates: 49°21′25″N 3°14′56″E
- Country: France
- Region: Hauts-de-France
- Department: Aisne
- Arrondissement: Soissons
- Canton: Vic-sur-Aisne
- Intercommunality: Retz-en-Valois

Government
  - Mayor (2026–32): Guillaume Lhomme
- Area^{1}: 8.53 km^{2} (3.29 sq mi)
- Elevation: 120 m (390 ft)
- Highest elevation: 161 m (528 ft)
- Lowest elevation: 58 m (190 ft)
- Population (2023): 202
  - Density: 23.7/km^{2} (61.3/sq mi)
- Time zone: UTC+01:00 (CET)
  - Summer (DST): UTC+02:00 (CEST)
- INSEE/Postal code: 02667 /02200
- ^{1} French Land Register data, which excludes lakes, ponds, glaciers > 1 km^{2} (0.386 sq mi or 247 acres) and river estuaries.

Saconin-et-Breuil (French pronunciation: [sakɔnɛ̃ e bʁœj]) is a commune in the Aisne department in Hauts-de-France in northern France.

== Population ==
Historical population
Year	Pop.	±% p.a.
1968	194	—
1975	205	+0.79%
1982	211	+0.41%
1990	233	+1.25%
1999	234	+0.05%
2007	227	−0.38%
2012	223	−0.35%
2017	228	+0.44%
2023	202	−2.00%
Source: INSEE

== See also ==
- Communes of the Aisne department
