= Pierre Berdoulat =

French World War I general

Pierre Berdoulat KCMG
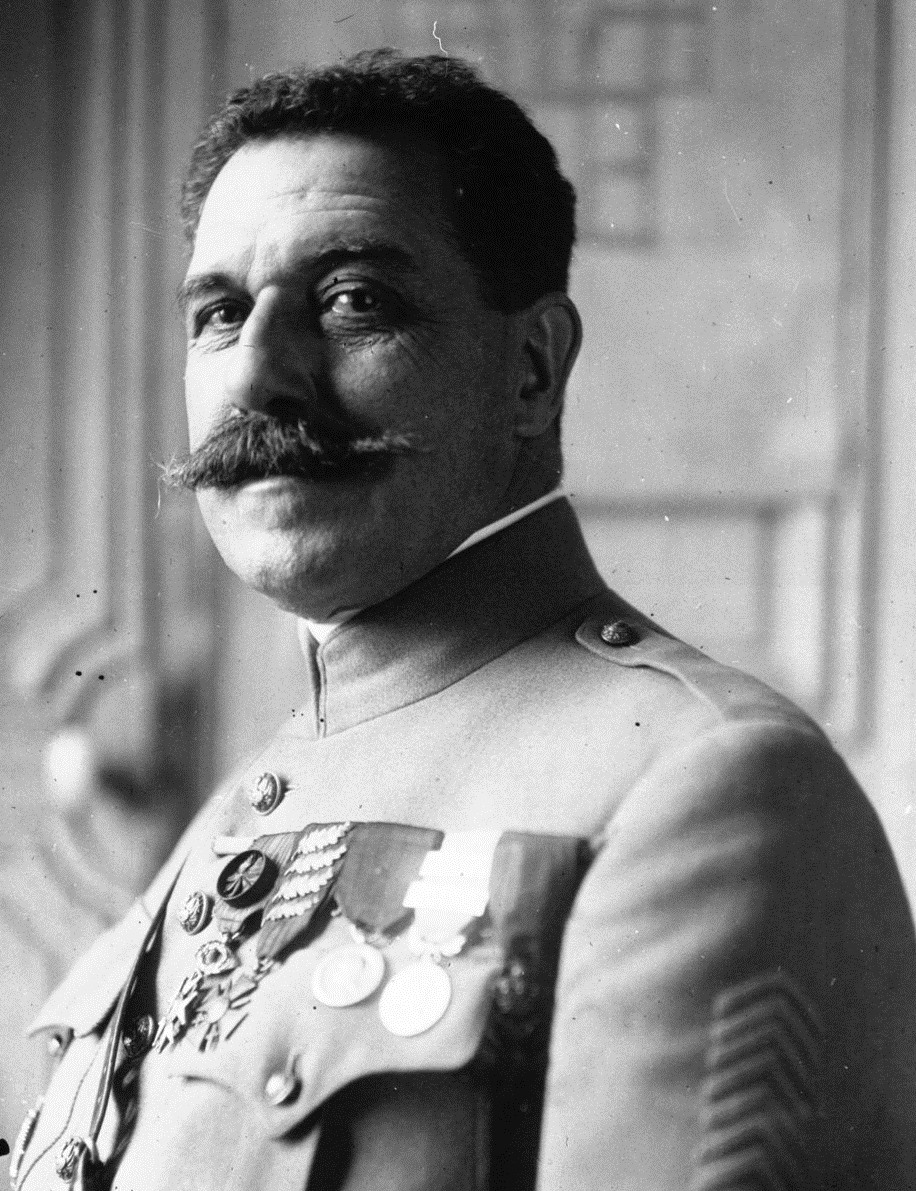

Military governor of Paris
- In office February 18, 1919 – July 20, 1923
- President: Alexandre Millerand
- Prime Minister: Raymond Poincaré
- Preceded by: Charles Emile Moinier
- Succeeded by: Henri Gouraud

Personal details
- Born: July 29, 1861 Pinsaguel, Haute-Garonne, France
- Died: November 24, 1930 (aged 69) Paris, Seine, France
- Spouse: Marguerite Alice de Moines
- Education: École spéciale militaire de Saint-Cyr

Military service
- Allegiance: France
- Branch: French Army
- Years of service: 1879–1923
- Rank: Général de Division
- Commands: 69th Infantry Division (1914–1915); 1st Army Corps (1915–1917); 20th Army Corps (1917–1919)
- Battles/wars: Sino-French War; 1904–1905 uprising in Madagascar; World War I: Western Front; Second Battle of Champagne; Battle of the Somme

Pierre Émile Berdoulat (July 29, 1861 – November 24, 1930) was a French Divisional General who participated in World War I. He participated in the battles of the 2nd Champagne and the Somme before becoming the Military governor of Paris from 1919 to 1923.

== Biography ==
Pierre Émile Berdoulat was born on July 29, 1861, in Pinsaguel, Haute-Garonne. His parents were Isidor Berdoulat and Alfonsina Deffes. He studied at the lyceums of Toulouse and Bordeaux.

On October 20, 1879, he volunteered for military service as a soldier of the 57th Infantry Regiment. On September 21, 1880, he received the rank of corporal. On October 27, 1882, he was enrolled in the École spéciale militaire de Saint-Cyr. On September 11, 1884, he graduated from high school, and on October 1 of the same year, with the rank of second lieutenant, he was enlisted in the Troupes de la Marine. He then entered in the 4th Colonial Infantry Regiment in Toulon and took part in the fighting in the Sino-French War as well as pacification operations in Bình Thuận and Khánh Hòa.

On November 2, 1886, he was promoted to lieutenant. He served in the 1st Tonkinois Tirailleurs Regiment and the 6th Colonial Infantry Regiment. On January 1, 1892, he was transferred to work at the Chief of Staff of the French Army. On August 12 of the same year, he was promoted to captain. On April 17, 1893, he married Marguerite Alice de Moines. On May 26 of the same year, he was appointed head of the 4th department at the headquarters of the 2nd naval district in Brest. He then served in the 2nd Marine Infantry Regiment. After graduating from the École navale on November 27, 1896, he joined the military government of Paris as a trainee.

On November 8, 1898, he was sent to serve at headquarters at French Sudan and participated in quelling the unrest there. On May 30, 1900, he was promoted to battalion commander. On January 22, 1901, he was sent to serve in the technical department of the administration of the Troupes coloniales. On August 1, 1903, he was appointed chief of staff of the occupation corps in Madagascar. On March 30, 1904, he was promoted to the rank of lieutenant colonel. Served in the 3rd Marine Infantry Regiment which participated in the 1904–1905 uprising in Madagascar.

On March 26, 1908, he was promoted to colonel. He served in the 28th Colonial Infantry Regiment. On July 1, 1910, he became commander of the 1st Malagash Tyralliers Regiment. On December 1 of the same year, he was appointed director of the 1st Bureau of the Colonial Troops. On December 30, 1911, he took over as director of the colonial troops. On February 14, 1912, he became a member of the National Committee for the Defense of the Colonies. On October 23, 1912, he was promoted to the rank of brigadier general.

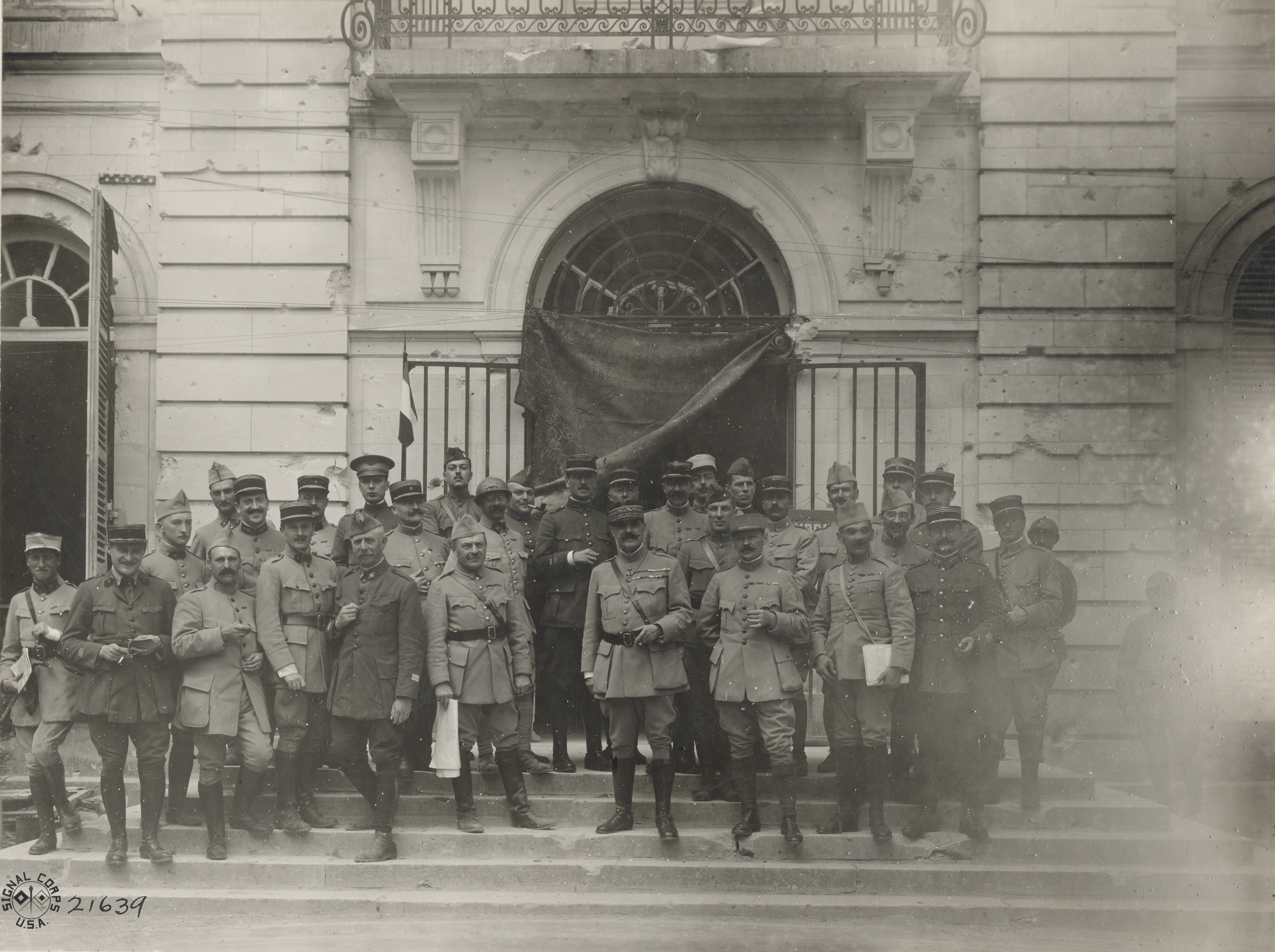
Officers of the French XX Corps, with Pierre Bourdalot in the centre of the group, outside the Château de Montgobert, France, July 1918.

After the start of the war, on October 8, 1914, he was appointed commander of the 52nd Infantry Brigade. On November 5, 1914, he took up the post of commander of the 69th Infantry Division. On April 20, 1915, he was promoted to the rank of divisional general. On April 29, 1915, he was appointed commander of the 1st Colonial Army Corps. During the Second Battle of Champagne from September 15 to October 2, 1915, the corps under the command of Berdoulat captured heavily fortified German positions and repelled stubborn German attacks for seven days in a row, for which he received the gratitude of the President of the French Republic, Raymond Poincaré. In July 1916, during the first days of the Battle of the Somme, Berdoulat's corps was able to advance 10 kilometers deep into enemy territory, capturing 85 guns and over 8,000 prisoners. On July 19, 1917, he commanded the 20th Army Corps. By the end of 1917, the corps under the command of Berdoulat as part of the 10th Army of General Mangin advanced 30 kilometers deep into the front line, drove the Germans out of Guise, capturing 12,000 prisoners, 140 guns and a large amount of equipment. On January 21, 1919, Berdoulat remained the commander of the army corps and received the command of the 20th region.

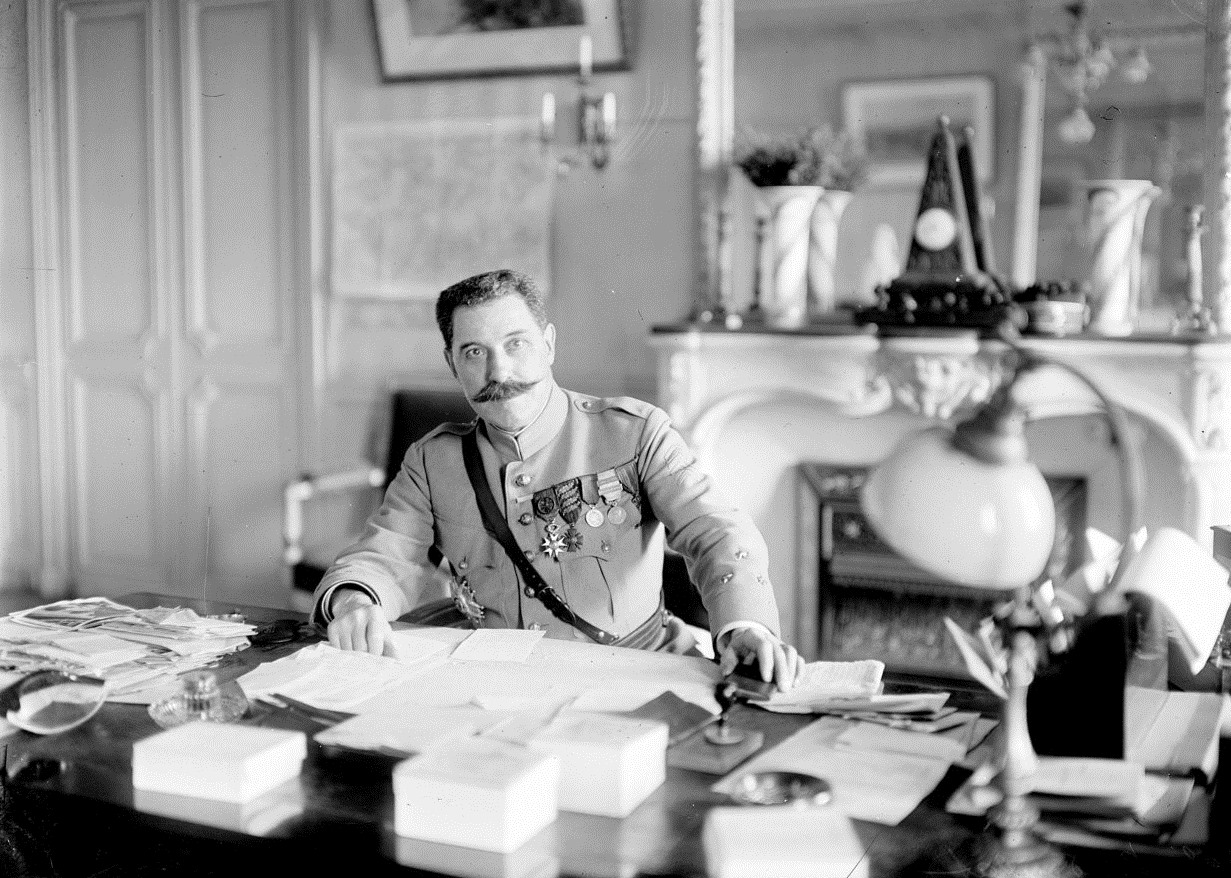
Berdoulat as the Military Governor of Paris. (1919)

On February 18, 1919, he was appointed to the post of Military governor of Paris, replacing Division General Charles Emile Monnier. After Berdoulat reached the age limit for service, on July 20, 1923, he was replaced in this position by divisional general Henri Joseph Gouraud.

On July 29, 1923, Berdoulat was enrolled in the personnel reserve of the headquarters of the colonial troops. On January 24, 1928, by decision of President Gaston Doumerga, he was appointed to the Council of the National Order of the Legion of Honor. He served as president of the Offrandes nationales organization, which provides assistance to military personnel, their widows and children.

Pierre-Émile Berdoulat died on November 24, 1930, in the Val-de-Grâce military hospital in Paris, where he was receiving treatment. The farewell took place in the Val-de-Grâce church in the presence of the representative of the President of France, General Henri Lasson, the Minister of War André Maginot, the Chief of the General Staff of the Armed Forces Maxime Weygand, almost all members of the Supreme Military Council, including Marshal Philippe Pétain, numerous military and civilians. The funeral took place in Reims without military honors, since Berdoulat, during his lifetime, asked not to distract the troops on this occasion once again. On December 18 of the same year, he was replaced as a member of the Council of the National Order of the Legion of Honor by Divisional General Marie-Eugene Debeny.

== Legacy ==
On September 9, 1935, on the square of Pinsaguel, with the participation of General Adolphe Guillaume, a bronze bust of Berdoul by the sculptor Auguste Seys was erected.

== Awards ==
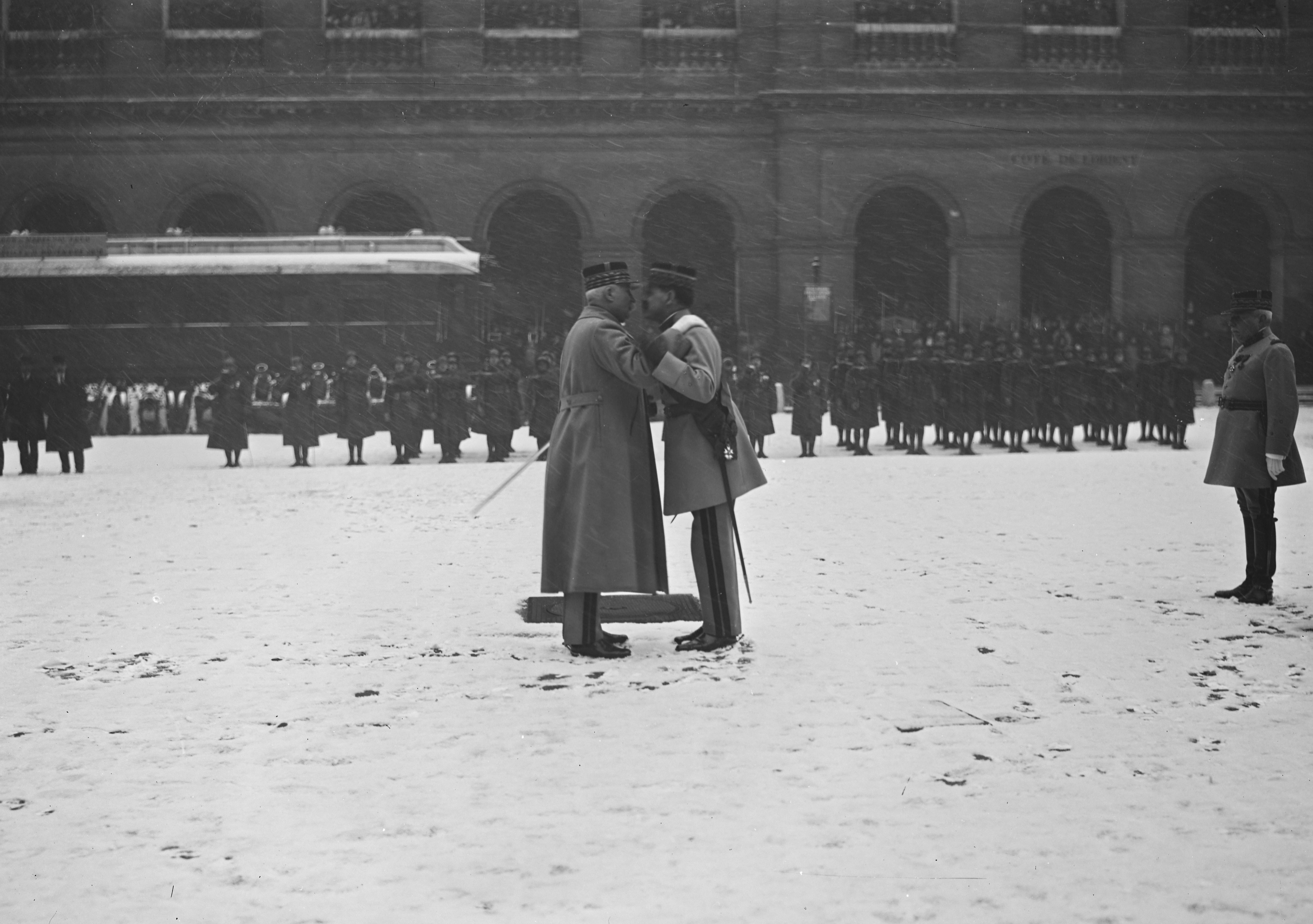
Marshal Pétain presenting Divisional General Berdoulat with the insignia of the Knight of the Grand Cross of the Legion of Honor, January 18, 1923.

=== Military awards ===
- Legion of Honor
  - Knight's Grand Cross (December 29, 1922)
  - Grand Officer (September 28, 1918)
  - Commander (July 13, 1915)
  - Officer (March 8, 1906)
  - Cavalier (December 29, 1889)
- Order of the Black Star, officer (February 25, 1904)
- Order of the Star of Anjouan, officer (December 7, 1905)
- Croix de Guerre (With Palm Tree, awarded four times)
- Colonial Medal with Medal bar (For service in Sudan and Madagascar)
- Tonkin Expedition commemorative medal
- 1914–1918 Inter-Allied Victory medal
- Commemorative Medal of the Battle of Verdun
- 1914–1918 Commemorative war medal

=== Civilian awards ===
- Ordre des Palmes académiques (December 31, 1905)
- Gold Medal of the Seine (March 5, 1926)

=== Foreign awards ===
- Belgium: Order of Leopold, 1st Class (Grand Officer)
- Belgium: Croix de guerre
- Spain: Cross of Military Merit, Grand Cross
- United Kingdom: Order of St. Michael and St. George, Knight's Commander
- United States: Distinguished Service Medal

== Sources ==
- Berdoulat (Pierre Émile) (1924). Qui êtes-vous? Annuaire des contemporains: notices biographiques. Maison Ehret. G. Ruffy, successeur, Editeur. p. 62.
- Nicot, Jean (1969). Inventaire Sommaire Des Archives de la Guerre 1914–1918 (PDF). Imprimerie La Renaissance. p. 691. Archived from the original (PDF) on December 7, 2016.
