= 102nd Fortress Division =

102d Fortress Division
- Active: World War I
- Country: France
- Branch: Infantry (World War I)
- Part of: 13th Army Corps (World War I)
- Engagements: Battle of France

The French 102nd Division was an Infantry division (French: 102e Division d'Infanterie Territoriale, 102e DIT) of the French Army during World War I, and a Fortress division (French: 102e Division d'Infanterie de Forteresse, 102e DIF) during World War II.

== World War I ==
During World War I, the division comprised the 286th Territorial Infantry Regiment, the 292nd Territorial Infantry Regiment, the 326th Territorial Infantry Regiment and the 342nd Territorial Infantry Regiment.

The division was formed on 25 May 1915 and dissolved on 1 May 1916. During this time, it was part of the French 13th Army Corps (13e Corps d' Army (CA)) (part of the Sixth Army).

== World War II ==
During the Battle of France in May 1940, the division was made up of:

- 148th Fortress Infantry Regiment
- 42nd Colonial Machine Gun Half Brigade
- 52nd Colonial Machine Gun Half Brigade
- 3rd Machine Gun Battalion
- 160th Artillery Regiment
- 218th Artillery Regiment

It was a Series A reserve division, which contained younger reservists and a Fortress Division defending the French Border with Belgium. The division was led by General André Corap and resisted the German invasion at the Meuse. On 14 May they held up the 6th Panzer Division at Montherme but withdrew when they came under attack from the rear.
