= 102nd Regiment of Foot (Irish Rangers) =

- Active: 1793–1795
- Country: Kingdom of Great Britain
- Branch: British Army

Commanders
- Commander: Lieutenant-Colonel Eyre Power Trench

The 102nd Regiment of Foot was a short-lived regiment of the British Army raised in 1793 and disbanded in 1795.

The regiment was raised in Ireland on 31 October 1793 as Trench's Regiment of Foot, and was informally known as the "Irish Rangers". The Lieutenant-Colonel Commandant was Eyre Power Trench. The regiment was numbered as 102nd Regiment of Foot in October 1794, and in 1795 was stationed in Guernsey. The regiment was disbanded at Nursling in 1795 and its personnel transferred to the 3rd (the East Kent) Regiment of Foot at Southampton.
