= 102nd Regiment =

In military terms, 102nd Regiment may refer to:

== Infantry regiments ==
- 102nd Infantry Regiment (Imperial Japanese Army)
- 102nd Infantry Regiment (France)
- 102nd Infantry Regiment (United States)
- 102nd Indiana Infantry Regiment, of the Union Army
- 102nd United States Colored Infantry Regiment, of the Union Army
- 102nd Regiment of Foot (Royal Madras Fusiliers), originally raised by the British East India Company and absorbed by the British Army in 1862
- 102nd Regiment of Foot (Irish Rangers), of the British Army (1793-1795)
- 102nd Regiment of Foot, or New South Wales Corps, of the British Army (1789–1810)
- 102nd Regiment, Rocky Mountain Rangers, now The Rocky Mountain Rangers
- 102nd Grenadier Regiment, part of the 24th Infantry Division (Wehrmacht)

== Artillery regiments ==
- 102nd (Pembroke Yeomanry) Medium Regiment, Royal Artillery

== Aviation regiments ==
- 102nd Regiment, part of the 34th Transport Division (China)

== Cavalry regiments ==
- 102nd Cavalry Regiment, of the US Army
- 102nd Cavalry Regiment, part of the 36th Cavalry Division (Soviet Union)
