= Acy =

Acy or ACY may refer to:

== People with the surname ==
- Quincy Acy (born 1990), American basketball player

== Places ==
=== France ===
- Acy, Aisne
- Acy-en-Multien, Oise
- Acy-Romance, Ardennes

=== United Kingdom ===
- Abercynon railway station (National Rail code: ACY), a railway station on the Merthyr Line in South Wales
- Archway tube station (London Underground code: ACY), a tube station on the High Barnet branch of the Northern line in Archway, London

=== United States ===
- Acy, Louisiana
- Atlantic City, New Jersey, a city in southern New Jersey known for its boardwalk and casinos
  - Atlantic City Rail Terminal (Amtrak code: ACY), a railway station on New Jersey Transit's Atlantic City Line
- Atlantic City International Airport in New Jersey, USA (IATA airport code ACY)

== Other uses ==
- Akron, Canton and Youngstown Railroad, a former railroad in Ohio, US
- Cypriot Maronite Arabic, a moribund variety of Arabic spoken by the Maronite community of Cyprus
