= Asteelflash Group =

French electronics manufacturing company

- Type: Private
- Industry: EMS Industry
- Predecessor: Asteel; Flash Electronics
- Founded: 1999; 27 years ago in Paris, France
- Founder: Gilles Benhamou
- Headquarters: Neuilly-Plaisance, France
- Number of locations: 17 plants, incl. 2 R&D centers (2020)
- Area served: Worldwide
- Products: Printed circuit board assembly (PCBA)
- Services: Design; Manufacturing; Aftermarket services
- Revenue: ▲€1,048,000,000 (2018)
- Number of employees: 5,700 (2020)
- Divisions: Asteelflash Technologie; Asteelflash Développement
- Website: asteelflash.com

Asteelflash Group is a French multinational electronics contract manufacturing company specializing in printed circuit board assembly and also offering design and aftermarket services.

Headquartered in Neuilly-Plaisance, France, it is the second largest electronics manufacturing services (EMS) company in Europe and ranks among top 20 worldwide with manufacturing operations in 18 countries, totaling approximately 2 million square feet and 5,700 employees.

== History ==
In 1999, the company was founded in Paris as Asteel by Gilles Benhamou. The EMS company experienced rapid growth through acquisitions. Asteel then extended its operations into North Africa and Europe and acquired new premises in both Tunisia (in Mégrine and Fouchana) and the United Kingdom (in Bedford, England).

In 2008, Asteel acquired Flash Electronics, an American EMS company founded in 1994, and developed it into a multinational company, operating since then under the name Asteelflash. In so doing, the company reinforced its global footprint with new facilities in the USA (in Fremont, California) and in China (in Suzhou, Jiangsu).

In 2012, Asteelflash acquired American Catalyst Manufacturing Services, Inc. with plants in Raleigh, North Carolina and in Tijuana, Baja California, Mexico. Hoping to establish a permanent foothold in the European market, Asteelflash acquired French TES Electronic Solutions in 2011 and German EN ElectronicNetwork in 2012.

In 2020, Asteelflash was acquired by Universal Scientific Industrial (Shanghai) Co., Ltd (USI). USI is a contract manufacturer using both electronics manufacturing services (EMS) and original design manufacturer (ODM) with a dual-headquarter in Shanghai and Taiwan.

By 2014, it ranking No. 2 in Europe and among top 20 worldwide, Asteelflash's competitors are industry heavyweights such as: Flextronics (Singapore), Jabil (United States) or Foxconn (Taiwan), Benchmark (United States), Celestica (Canada), Plexus (United States) and Zollner (Germany).

== Market segments ==
- Industrial - This segment accounts for about 30% of Asteelflash Group's revenue.
- Data processing - This segment accounts for about 28% of Asteelflash Group's revenue.
- Defense and aerospace - This segment accounts for about 4% of Asteelflash Group's revenue.
- Transportation - This segment accounts for about 15% of Asteelflash Group's revenue.
- Energy management - This segment accounts for about 18% of Asteelflash Group's revenue.
- Medical - This segment accounts for about 5% of Asteelflash Group's revenue.

Asteelflash has manufacturing operations in eight countries on four continents, totaling 18 plants, approximately 2 million square feet manufacturing surface and +6,000 employees.

Asteelflash Group demarcated its global footprint into four geographical divisions, listed below.

=== Americas ===
300,000 ft^{2}, 400 employees

- United States
  - Fremont (California): 220,000 ft^{2}, 250 employees
- Mexico
  - Tijuana (Baja California): 80,000 ft^{2}, 150 employees

=== West Europe, the Middle East and Africa (EMEA) ===
610,000 ft^{2}, 2,044 employees

- France (393,000 ft^{2}, 800 employees)
  - AF Atlantique: Langon (Ille-et-Vilaine)
  - AF Normandie: Déville-lès-Rouen (Seine-Maritime)
  - AF Est: Duttlenheim (Bas-Rhin)
  - AF Lorraine : Cleurie (Vosges)
  - AF Île-de-France : Mercin-et-Vaux (Aisne)
- United Kingdom
  - Bedford (Bedfordshire, England) : 55,000 ft^{2}, 104 employees
- Tunisia
  - AF La Soukra : 162,000 ft², 1,140 employees

=== East EMEA ===
329,000 ft^{2}, 700 employees

- Germany
  - AF Bonn: Bornheim (North Rhine-Westphalia)
  - AF Design Solutions Hamburg: Hamburg (Hamburg)
  - AF Hersfeld: Bad Hersfeld (Hesse)
  - AF Eberbach: Eberbach (Baden-Württemberg)
- Czech Republic
  - Plzeň

=== Asia-Pacific ===
- China
  - Suzhou (Jiangsu) : 151,000 ft^{2}, 1,900 employees
