= Acy, Aisne =

Acy
- Commune
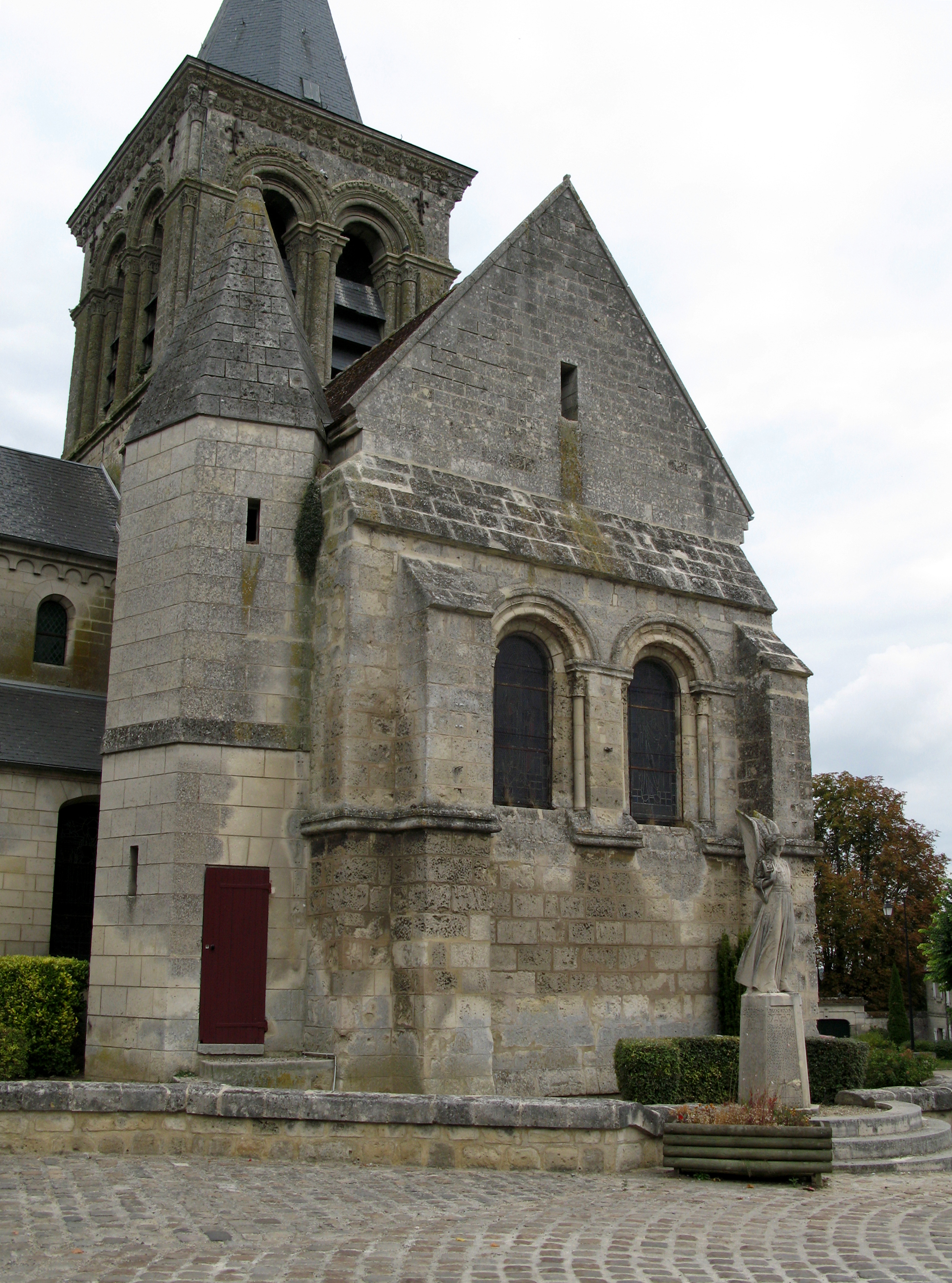

- Coat of arms
- Location of Acy
- Location within France Location within Hauts-de-France
- Coordinates: 49°20′46″N 3°24′51″E
- Country: France
- Region: Hauts-de-France
- Department: Aisne
- Arrondissement: Soissons
- Canton: Soissons-2
- Intercommunality: GrandSoissons Agglomération

Government
  - Mayor (2026–32): Guillaume Bourgeois
- Area^{1}: 11.67 km^{2} (4.51 sq mi)
- Elevation: 160 m (520 ft)
- Highest elevation: 165 m (541 ft)
- Lowest elevation: 42 m (138 ft)
- Population (2023): 1,004
  - Density: 86.03/km^{2} (222.8/sq mi)
- Time zone: UTC+01:00 (CET)
  - Summer (DST): UTC+02:00 (CEST)
- INSEE/Postal code: 02003 /02200
- ^{1} French Land Register data, which excludes lakes, ponds, glaciers > 1 km^{2} (0.386 sq mi or 247 acres) and river estuaries.

Acy (French pronunciation: [asi]) is a commune in the department of Aisne in the Hauts-de-France region of northern France.

The commune has been awarded one flower by the National Council of Towns and Villages in Bloom in the Competition of cities and villages in Bloom.

== Geography ==
Acy is located some 5 km southeast of Soissons. The European Route E46 heading east from Soissons forms a section of the northern border however access to the commune is via the Highway D952 which branches from the E46 in the north-west and goes south-east through the heart of the commune to Serches in the south-east. Access to Acy town is on the Rue de l'Aube which runs off the D952. The D951 branches off the E46 at the same place as the D952 and passes south through the commune to Ambrief in the south. The D6 road forms the southern border of the commune.

The river Aisne forms the northern border of the commune. An unnamed stream flows north through the heart of the commune to join the Aisne in the north.

=== Towns and villages in the commune ===
- Acy
- Jury
- L'Aube
- La Croutelle
- Le Transbordeur

== Heraldry ==
Arms of Acy	Blason: Or, three eagle claws gules 2 and 1 armed argent.

== Administration ==
List of Mayors of Acy

From	To	Name
2001	2014	Pierre Fourrier
2014	2020	Bertrand Pénasse
2020	2022	Dominique Mathaut
2022	Incumbent	Guillaume Bourgeois

== Population ==
The inhabitants of the commune are known as Acéens or Acéennes in French.

Historical population

Year	Pop.	±% p.a.
1793	626	—
1821	661	+0.19%
1846	706	+0.26%
1872	670	−0.20%
1901	627	−0.23%
1926	747	+0.70%
1946	812	+0.42%
1962	962	+1.07%
1968	924	−0.67%

Year	Pop.	±% p.a.
1975	922	−0.03%
1982	992	+1.05%
1990	985	−0.09%
1999	951	−0.39%
2007	903	−0.65%
2012	1,001	+2.08%
2017	1,012	+0.22%
2023	1,004	−0.13%

Source: EHESS and INSEE

== Culture and heritage ==
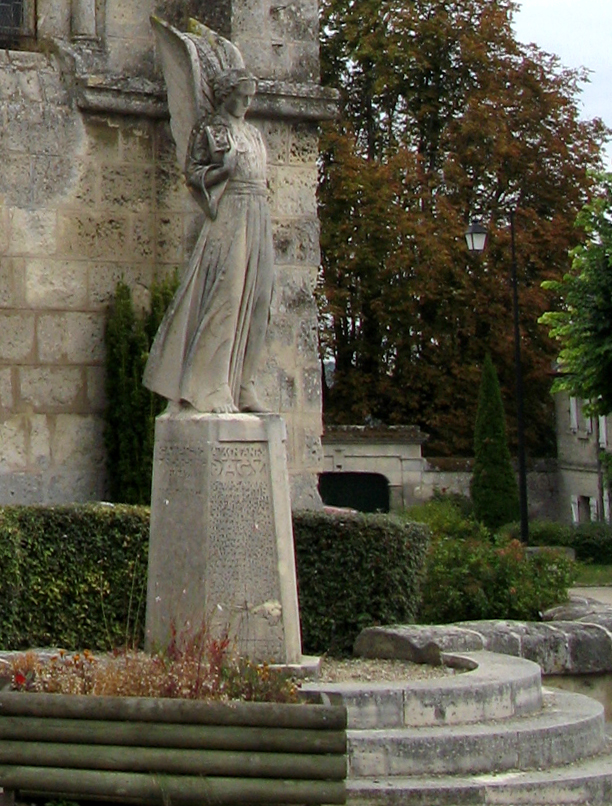
The War Memorial

=== Civil heritage ===
The commune has two structures that are registered as historical monuments:

- The War memorial (1924). The War memorial incorporates one item that is registered as an historical object:
  - A Statue: Angel of the Apocalypse (1924)
- The Monument to the 71st Alpine Infantry Regiment (1948). The monument incorporates one item that is registered as an historical object:
  - A Statue: Weeping (1948)

=== Religious heritage ===
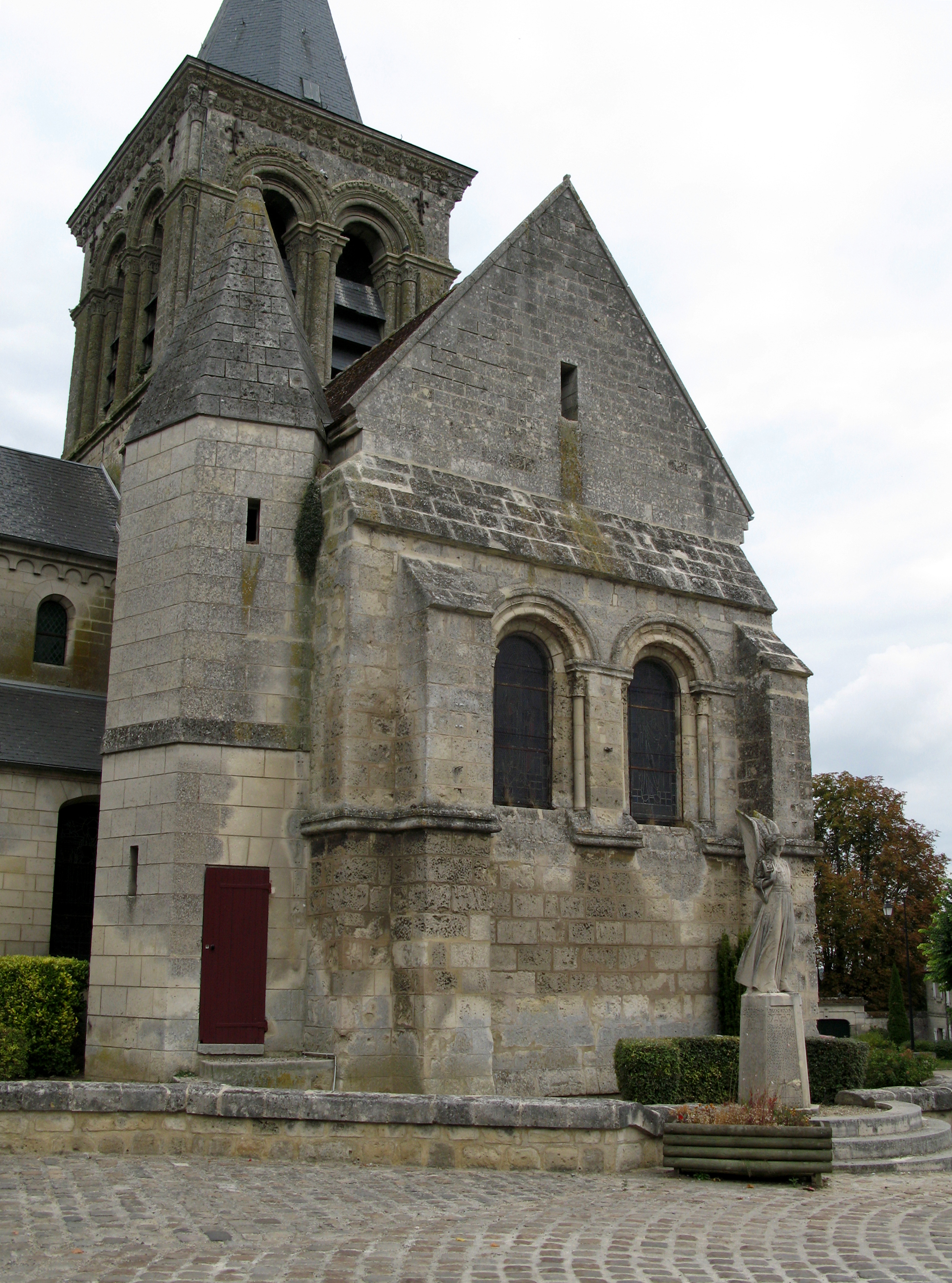
Church of Saint-Médard

The commune has two religious buildings and structures that are registered as historical monuments:

- A Calvary on Rue de la Croutelle (1878)
- The Parish Church of Saint-Médard (12th century) The Church contains many items that are registered as historical objects:
  - A Pulpit (20th century)
  - A Confessional (20th century)
  - A Statue: Immaculate conception (18th century)
  - A Bust-Reliquary of Saint-Medard (18th century)
  - A Statue: Saint Theresa and baby Jesus (1930-1931)
  - The Furniture in the Church (18th century)
  - Stained glass figure: Jesus healing, Calvary (1929)
  - Stained glass figure: Saint Francis of Assisi (1929)
  - 10 Stained glass windows of people (1929)
  - A Statue: Saint Theresa and the baby Jesus (1930)
  - A Statue: Saint Sebastian (18th century)
  - A Baptismal font with cover (1930)
  - A Painting on the Retable of the Baptismal font with frame: Baptism of Christ (18th century)
  - A mobile Pulpit and confessional (1930)
  - A Rood screen: Calvary (1930)
  - 2 Tapestries: Ecce homo and Virgin of sorrow (18th century)
  - The main Altar, Altar seating, Tabernacle, Choir enclosure (20th century)

== Education ==
There is the Charles-Chevallier primary and nursery school. The primary school is located at the Town hall.

== Notable people linked to the commune ==
- Jules Pressoir (1850-1929): Teacher
- Constant Lacroix (1846-1924): Farmer

== See also ==
- Communes of the Aisne department
