= Sermoise =

- Commune
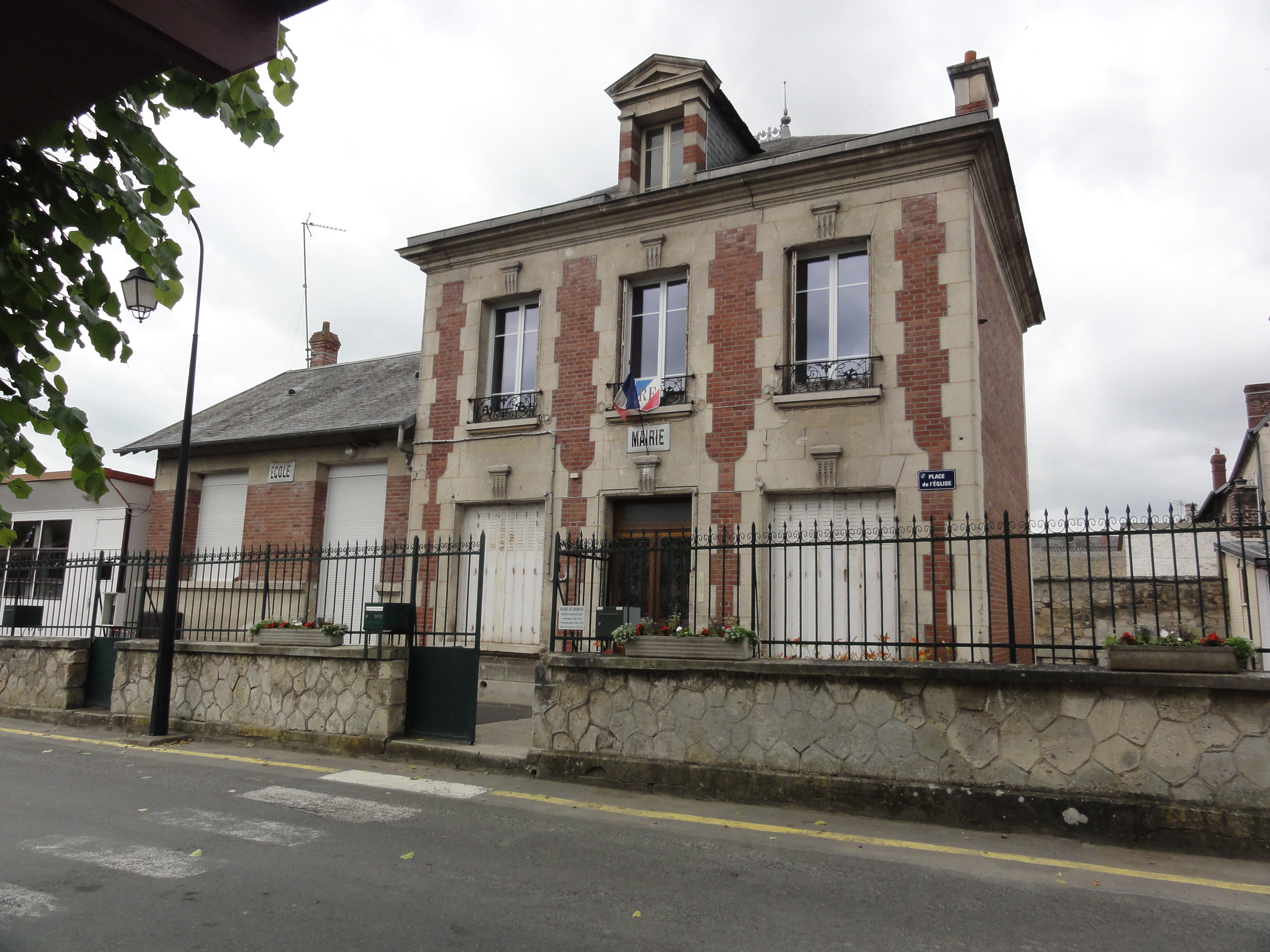
- The town hall and school of Sermoise
- Location of Sermoise
- Location within France Location within Hauts-de-France
- Coordinates: 49°22′26″N 3°27′03″E
- Country: France
- Region: Hauts-de-France
- Department: Aisne
- Arrondissement: Soissons
- Canton: Soissons-2
- Intercommunality: GrandSoissons Agglomération

Government
  - Mayor (2026–32): Patrick Dufour
- Area^{1}: 5.51 km^{2} (2.13 sq mi)
- Elevation: 50 m (160 ft)
- Highest elevation: 163 m (535 ft)
- Lowest elevation: 42 m (138 ft)
- Population (2023): 340
  - Density: 62/km^{2} (160/sq mi)
- Time zone: UTC+01:00 (CET)
  - Summer (DST): UTC+02:00 (CEST)
- INSEE/Postal code: 02714 /02220
- ^{1} French Land Register data, which excludes lakes, ponds, glaciers > 1 km^{2} (0.386 sq mi or 247 acres) and river estuaries.

Sermoise (French pronunciation: [sɛʁmwaz]) is a commune in the Aisne department in Hauts-de-France in northern France.

== Population ==
Historical population
Year	Pop.	±% p.a.
1968	302	—
1975	289	−0.63%
1982	300	+0.54%
1990	361	+2.34%
1999	341	−0.63%
2007	315	−0.99%
2012	339	+1.48%
2017	349	+0.58%
2023	340	−0.43%
Source: INSEE

The inhabitants of the town of Sermoise are called Sermoisiens in French.

== See also ==
- Communes of the Aisne department
