= Billy-sur-Aisne =

- Commune
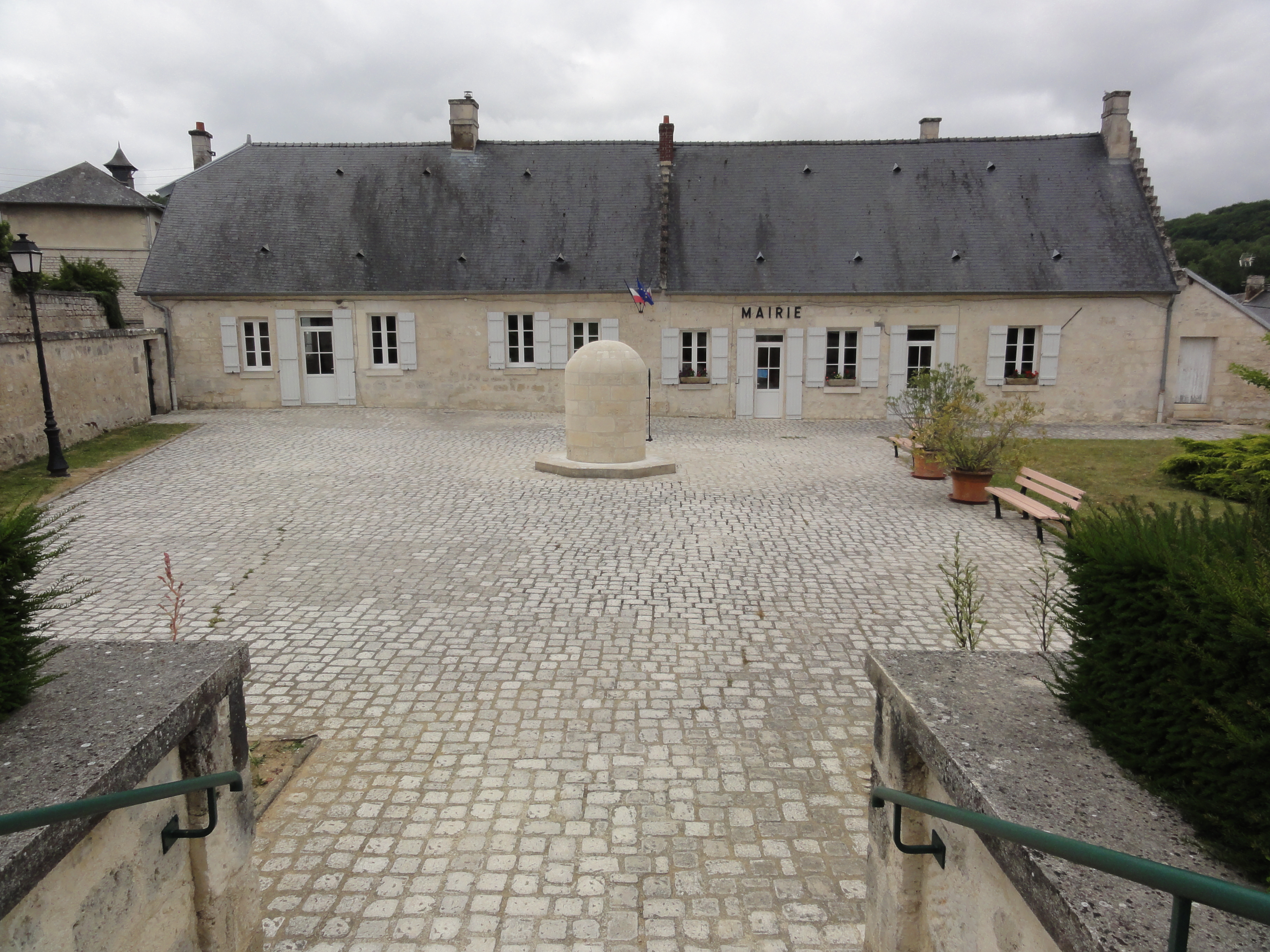
- The town hall of Billy-sur-Aisne

- Coat of arms
- Location of Billy-sur-Aisne
- Location within France Location within Hauts-de-France
- Coordinates: 49°21′24″N 3°23′02″E
- Country: France
- Region: Hauts-de-France
- Department: Aisne
- Arrondissement: Soissons
- Canton: Soissons-2
- Intercommunality: GrandSoissons Agglomération

Government
  - Mayor (2026–32): Jean-Luc Mutet
- Area^{1}: 7.47 km^{2} (2.88 sq mi)
- Elevation: 72 m (236 ft)
- Highest elevation: 160 m (520 ft)
- Lowest elevation: 56 m (184 ft)
- Population (2023): 1,130
  - Density: 151/km^{2} (392/sq mi)
- Time zone: UTC+01:00 (CET)
  - Summer (DST): UTC+02:00 (CEST)
- INSEE/Postal code: 02089 /02200
- ^{1} French Land Register data, which excludes lakes, ponds, glaciers > 1 km^{2} (0.386 sq mi or 247 acres) and river estuaries.

Billy-sur-Aisne is a commune in the department of Aisne in Hauts-de-France in northern France.

== Population ==
Historical population
| Year | Pop. | ±% p.a. |
|---|---|---|
| 1968 | 1,160 | — |
| 1975 | 1,256 | +1.14% |
| 1982 | 1,338 | +0.91% |
| 1990 | 1,279 | −0.56% |
| 1999 | 1,189 | −0.81% |
| 2007 | 1,109 | −0.87% |
| 2012 | 1,122 | +0.23% |
| 2017 | 1,154 | +0.56% |
| 2023 | 1,130 | −0.35% |
Source: INSEE

== See also ==
- Communes of the Aisne department
