= Canton of Soissons-2 =

Coordinates: 49.3667°N 3.3333°E

Soissons-2
- Canton
- Interactive map of Soissons-2
- Country: France
- Region: Hauts-de-France
- Department: Aisne
- No. of communes: {{{nbcomm}}}
- Area: 91.26 km^{2} (35.24 sq mi)
- Population (2023): 29,035
  - Density: 318.2/km^{2} (824.0/sq mi)
- INSEE code: 02 17

The canton of Soissons-2 (before 2015: Soissons-Sud) is an administrative division in northern France. It consists of the southern part of the town of Soissons and its southern suburbs. At the French canton reorganisation which came into effect in March 2015, the canton was expanded from 11 to 14 communes. Since the merger, on 1 January 2023, of Berzy-le-Sec and Noyant-et-Aconin into Bernoy-le-Château the canton has had 13 communes.

1. Acy
2. Belleu
3. Bernoy-le-Château
4. Billy-sur-Aisne
5. Courmelles
6. Mercin-et-Vaux
7. Missy-aux-Bois
8. Ploisy
9. Septmonts
10. Serches
11. Sermoise
12. Soissons (partly)
13. Vauxbuin

== Demographics ==
Historical population
Year	Pop.	±% p.a.
2013	29,069	—
2018	29,370	+0.21%
Source: INSEE

== See also ==
- Cantons of the Aisne department
- Communes of France
