= Courmelles =

- Commune
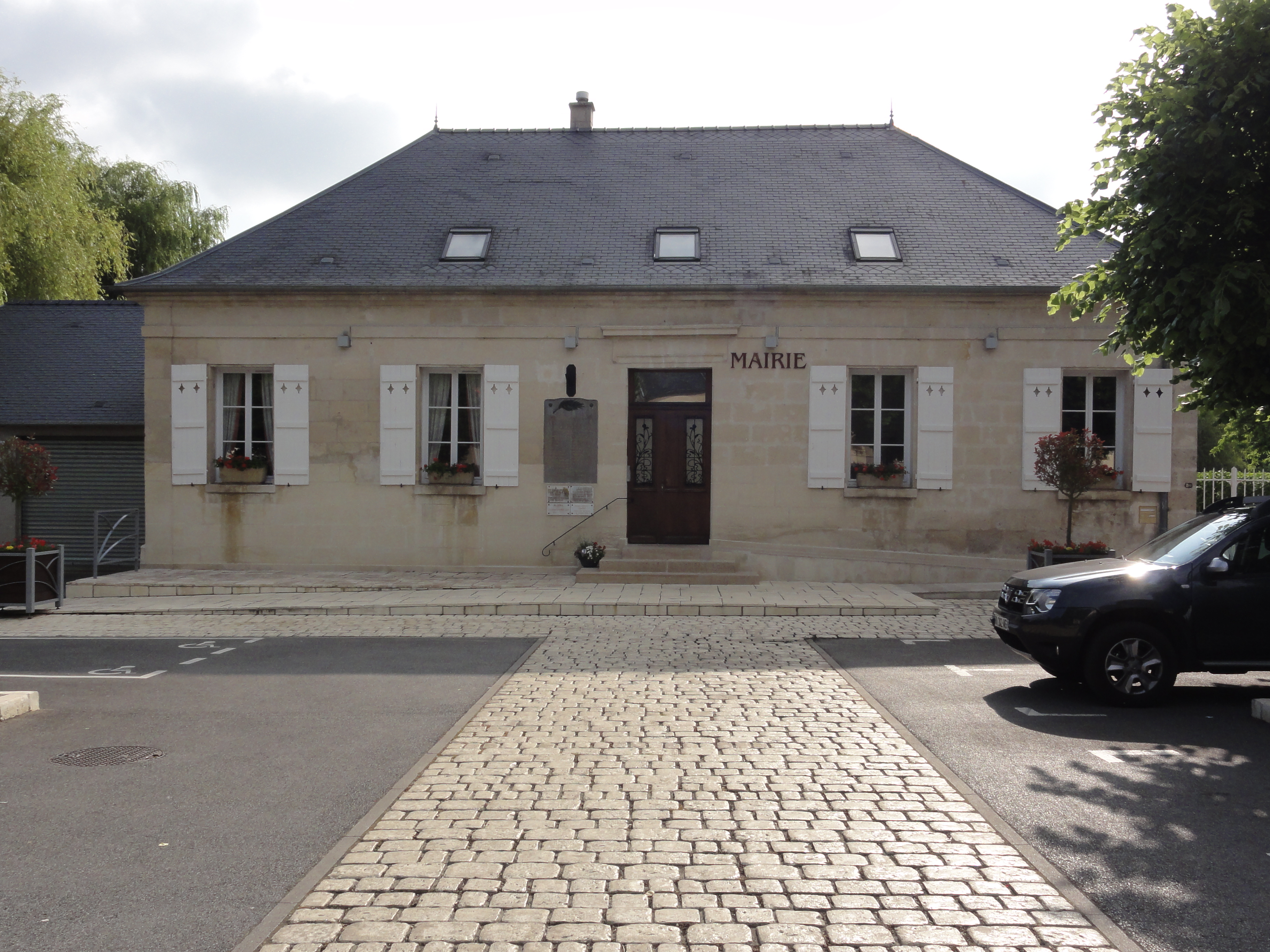
- The town hall of Courmelles

- Coat of arms
- Location of Courmelles
- Location within France Location within Hauts-de-France
- Coordinates: 49°20′44″N 3°18′48″E
- Country: France
- Region: Hauts-de-France
- Department: Aisne
- Arrondissement: Soissons
- Canton: Soissons-2
- Intercommunality: GrandSoissons Agglomération

Government
  - Mayor (2026–32): Arnaud Svrcek
- Area^{1}: 6.76 km^{2} (2.61 sq mi)
- Elevation: 60 m (200 ft)
- Highest elevation: 163 m (535 ft)
- Lowest elevation: 49 m (161 ft)
- Population (2023): 1,808
  - Density: 267/km^{2} (693/sq mi)
- Time zone: UTC+01:00 (CET)
  - Summer (DST): UTC+02:00 (CEST)
- INSEE/Postal code: 02226 /02200
- ^{1} French Land Register data, which excludes lakes, ponds, glaciers > 1 km^{2} (0.386 sq mi or 247 acres) and river estuaries.

Courmelles (French pronunciation: [kuʁmɛl]) is a commune in the Aisne department in Hauts-de-France in northern France.

== Population ==
Historical population
Year	Pop.	±% p.a.
1968	963	—
1975	1,973	+10.79%
1982	2,101	+0.90%
1990	1,915	−1.15%
1999	1,659	−1.58%
2007	1,711	+0.39%
2012	1,716	+0.06%
2017	1,826	+1.25%
2023	1,808	−0.16%
Source: INSEE

== See also ==
- Communes of the Aisne department
