= Belleu =

- Commune
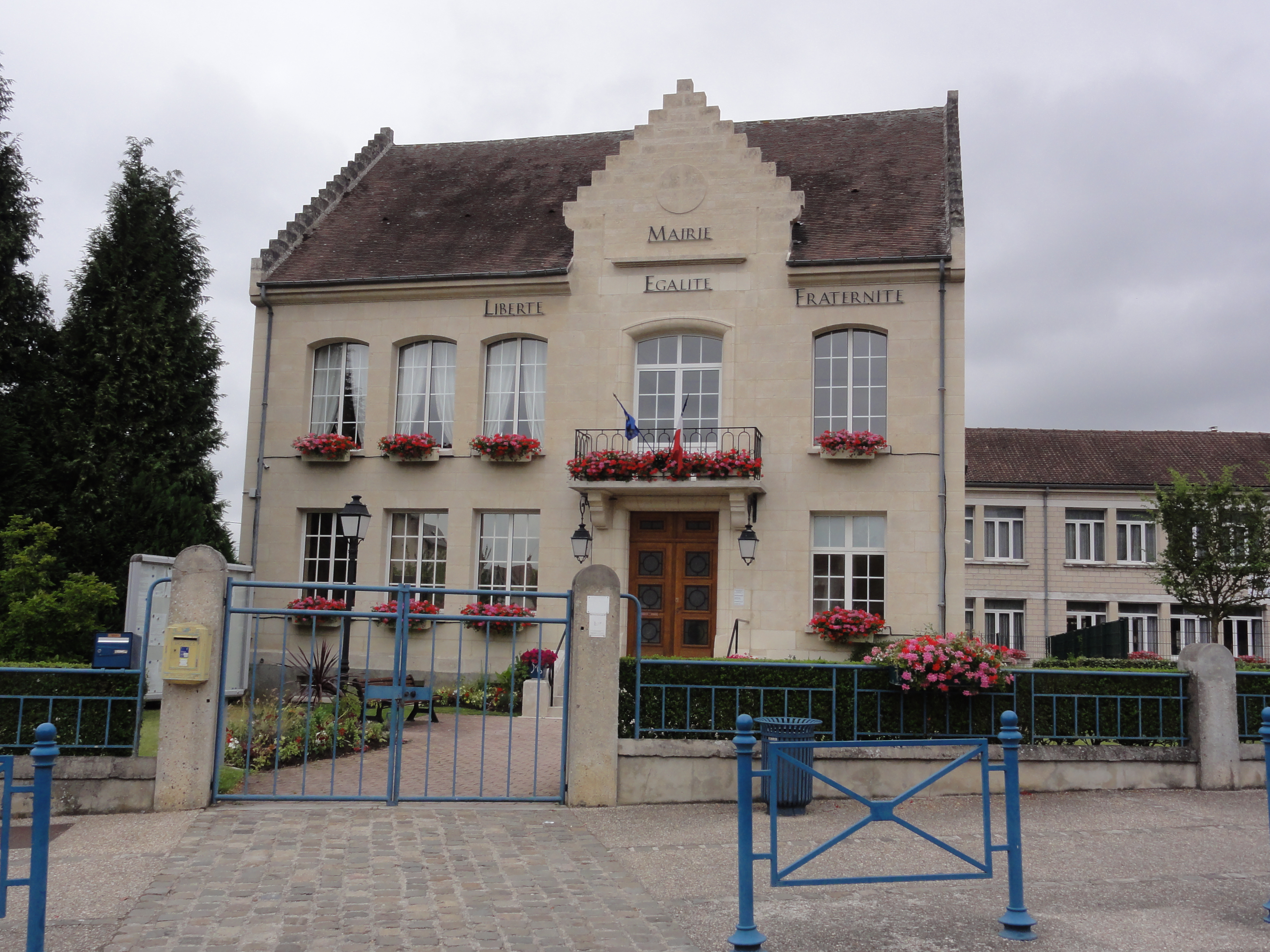
- Town hall

- Coat of arms
- Location of Belleu
- Location within France Location within Hauts-de-France
- Coordinates: 49°21′33″N 3°20′08″E
- Country: France
- Region: Hauts-de-France
- Department: Aisne
- Arrondissement: Soissons
- Canton: Soissons-2
- Intercommunality: GrandSoissons Agglomération

Government
  - Mayor (2026–32): Pascal Rault
- Area^{1}: 4.53 km^{2} (1.75 sq mi)
- Elevation: 67 m (220 ft)
- Highest elevation: 162 m (531 ft)
- Lowest elevation: 45 m (148 ft)
- Population (2023): 3,659
  - Density: 808/km^{2} (2,090/sq mi)
- Time zone: UTC+01:00 (CET)
  - Summer (DST): UTC+02:00 (CEST)
- INSEE/Postal code: 02064 /02200
- ^{1} French Land Register data, which excludes lakes, ponds, glaciers > 1 km^{2} (0.386 sq mi or 247 acres) and river estuaries.

Belleu (French pronunciation: [bɛlø]) is a commune in the department of Aisne in Hauts-de-France in northern France.

== Population ==
Historical population
| Year | Pop. | ±% p.a. |
|---|---|---|
| 1968 | 3,558 | — |
| 1975 | 3,606 | +0.19% |
| 1982 | 4,263 | +2.42% |
| 1990 | 4,083 | −0.54% |
| 1999 | 4,031 | −0.14% |
| 2007 | 3,931 | −0.31% |
| 2012 | 3,848 | −0.43% |
| 2017 | 3,810 | −0.20% |
| 2023 | 3,659 | −0.67% |
Source: INSEE

== See also ==
- Communes of the Aisne department
