= Septmonts =

- Commune
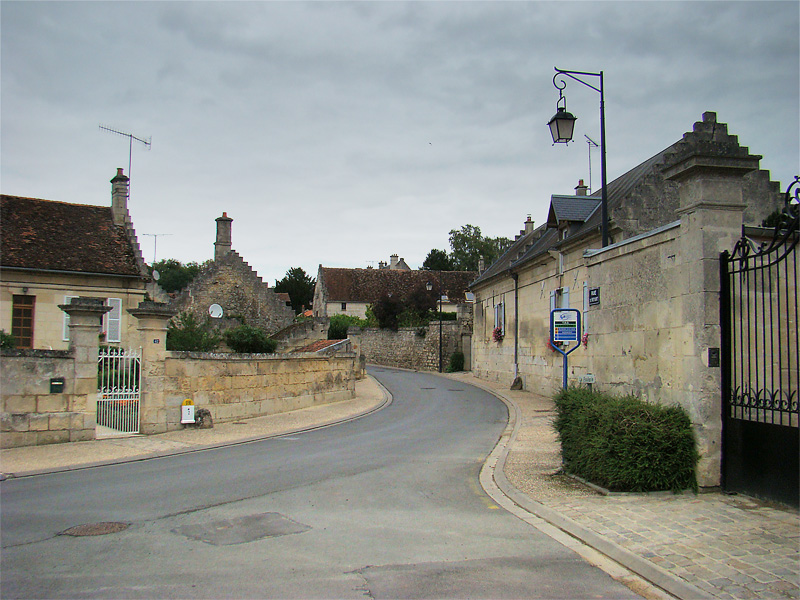
- A view within Septmonts
- Location of Septmonts
- Location within France Location within Hauts-de-France
- Coordinates: 49°20′04″N 3°21′28″E
- Country: France
- Region: Hauts-de-France
- Department: Aisne
- Arrondissement: Soissons
- Canton: Soissons-2
- Intercommunality: GrandSoissons Agglomération

Government
  - Mayor (2026–32): Sylvain Coudert
- Area^{1}: 4.8 km^{2} (1.9 sq mi)
- Elevation: 75 m (246 ft)
- Highest elevation: 161 m (528 ft)
- Lowest elevation: 57 m (187 ft)
- Population (2023): 576
  - Density: 120/km^{2} (310/sq mi)
- Time zone: UTC+01:00 (CET)
  - Summer (DST): UTC+02:00 (CEST)
- INSEE/Postal code: 02706 /02200
- ^{1} French Land Register data, which excludes lakes, ponds, glaciers > 1 km^{2} (0.386 sq mi or 247 acres) and river estuaries.

Septmonts (French pronunciation: [semɔ̃]) is a commune in the Aisne department in Hauts-de-France in northern France.

== Population ==
Historical population
Year	Pop.	±% p.a.
1968	532	—
1975	542	+0.27%
1982	516	−0.70%
1990	515	−0.02%
1999	501	−0.31%
2007	547	+1.10%
2012	579	+1.14%
2017	560	−0.67%
2023	576	+0.47%
Source: INSEE

== Donjon de Septmonts ==
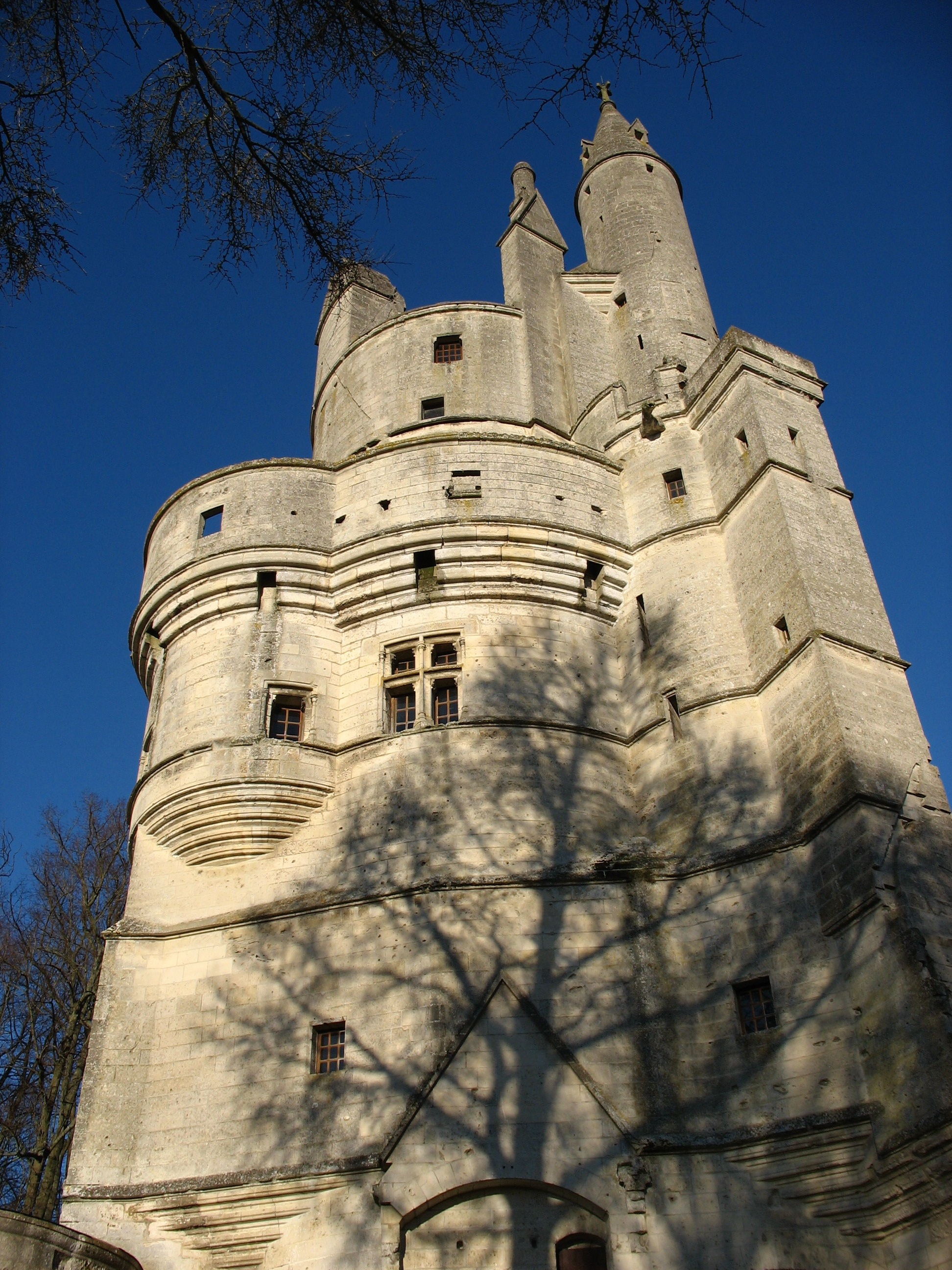
Donjon de Septmonts

In the heart of the village lies the remains of the Château de Septmonts, of which the principal remains are of the 14th century donjon or keep. The castle was the country seat of the Bishop of Soissons, probably since the last half of the 12th century and was first built in stone a little before 1242.

Thought to have been inspired by the works of Charles V of France, the 43-metre-tall (141 ft) donjon, exemplifies the princely style of the late 14th century, combining both military and residential function.

The donjon is currently undergoing a programme of restoration. The other sights at the chateau include:

- Ditches and walls
- Remains of the Salle St. Louis (13th century hall)
- Remains of the Renaissance bishop's palace
- Verger and Arboretum de Septmonts

== Saint-André de Septmonts church ==
The village contains a fifteenth-century church in the flamboyant style.

== See also ==
- Communes of the Aisne department
