= Vauxbuin =

- Commune
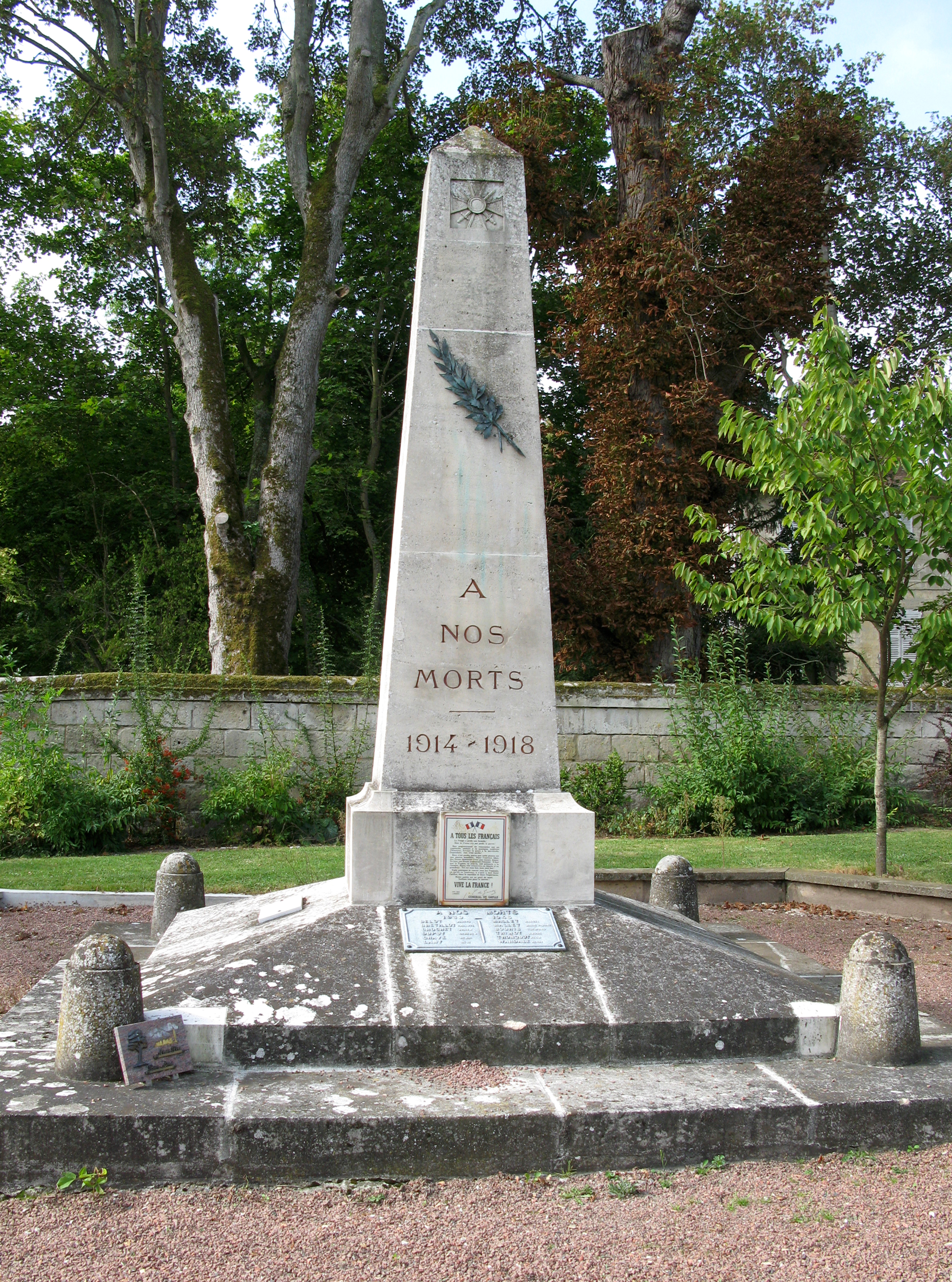
- World War I monument
- Location of Vauxbuin
- Location within France Location within Hauts-de-France
- Coordinates: 49°21′32″N 3°17′42″E
- Country: France
- Region: Hauts-de-France
- Department: Aisne
- Arrondissement: Soissons
- Canton: Soissons-2
- Intercommunality: GrandSoissons Agglomération

Government
  - Mayor (2026–32): David Bobin
- Area^{1}: 5 km^{2} (1.9 sq mi)
- Elevation: 70 m (230 ft)
- Highest elevation: 157 m (515 ft)
- Lowest elevation: 46 m (151 ft)
- Population (2023): 763
  - Density: 150/km^{2} (400/sq mi)
- Time zone: UTC+01:00 (CET)
  - Summer (DST): UTC+02:00 (CEST)
- INSEE/Postal code: 02770 /02200
- ^{1} French Land Register data, which excludes lakes, ponds, glaciers > 1 km^{2} (0.386 sq mi or 247 acres) and river estuaries.

Vauxbuin (French pronunciation: [vobɥɛ̃]) is a commune in the Aisne department in Hauts-de-France in northern France.

== Population ==
Historical population
Year	Pop.	±% p.a.
1968	663	—
1975	588	−1.70%
1982	936	+6.87%
1990	905	−0.42%
1999	827	−1.00%
2007	783	−0.68%
2012	775	−0.21%
2017	786	+0.28%
2023	763	−0.49%
Source: INSEE

== See also ==
- Communes of the Aisne department
