= Ploisy =

- Commune
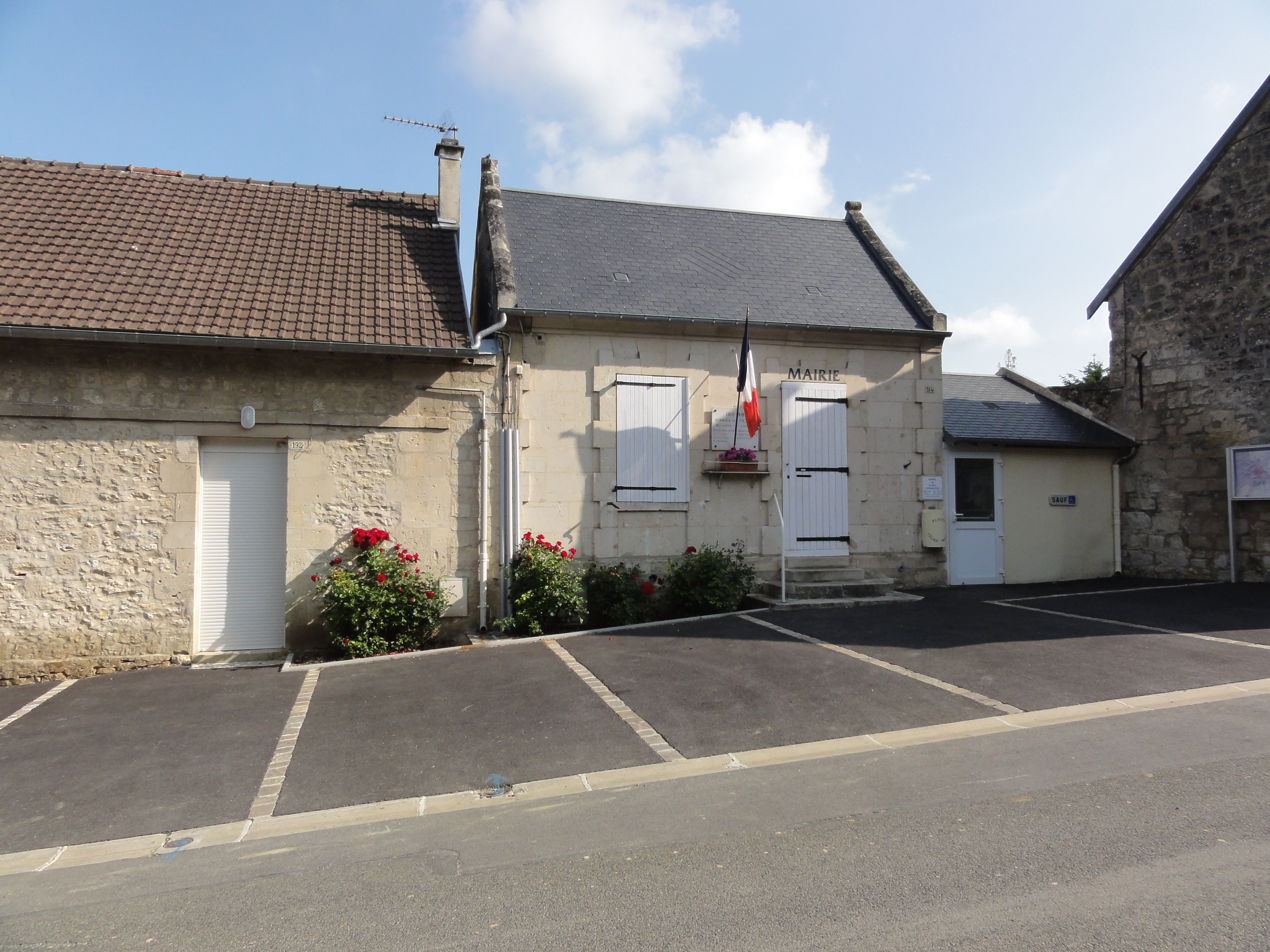
- The town hall of Ploisy
- Location of Ploisy
- Location within France Location within Hauts-de-France
- Coordinates: 49°19′56″N 3°17′30″E
- Country: France
- Region: Hauts-de-France
- Department: Aisne
- Arrondissement: Soissons
- Canton: Soissons-2
- Intercommunality: GrandSoissons Agglomération

Government
  - Mayor (2026–32): François Leroux
- Area^{1}: 2.87 km^{2} (1.11 sq mi)
- Elevation: 100 m (330 ft)
- Highest elevation: 166 m (545 ft)
- Lowest elevation: 73 m (240 ft)
- Population (2023): 100
  - Density: 35/km^{2} (90/sq mi)
- Time zone: UTC+01:00 (CET)
  - Summer (DST): UTC+02:00 (CEST)
- INSEE/Postal code: 02607 /02200
- ^{1} French Land Register data, which excludes lakes, ponds, glaciers > 1 km^{2} (0.386 sq mi or 247 acres) and river estuaries.

Ploisy (French pronunciation: [plwazi]) is a commune in the Aisne department in Hauts-de-France in northern France.

== Population ==
Historical population
Year	Pop.	±% p.a.
1968	89	—
1975	84	−0.82%
1982	67	−3.18%
1990	86	+3.17%
1999	88	+0.26%
2007	86	−0.29%
2012	82	−0.95%
2017	77	−1.25%
2023	100	+4.45%
Source: INSEE

== See also ==
- Communes of the Aisne department
