= Missy-aux-Bois =

- Commune
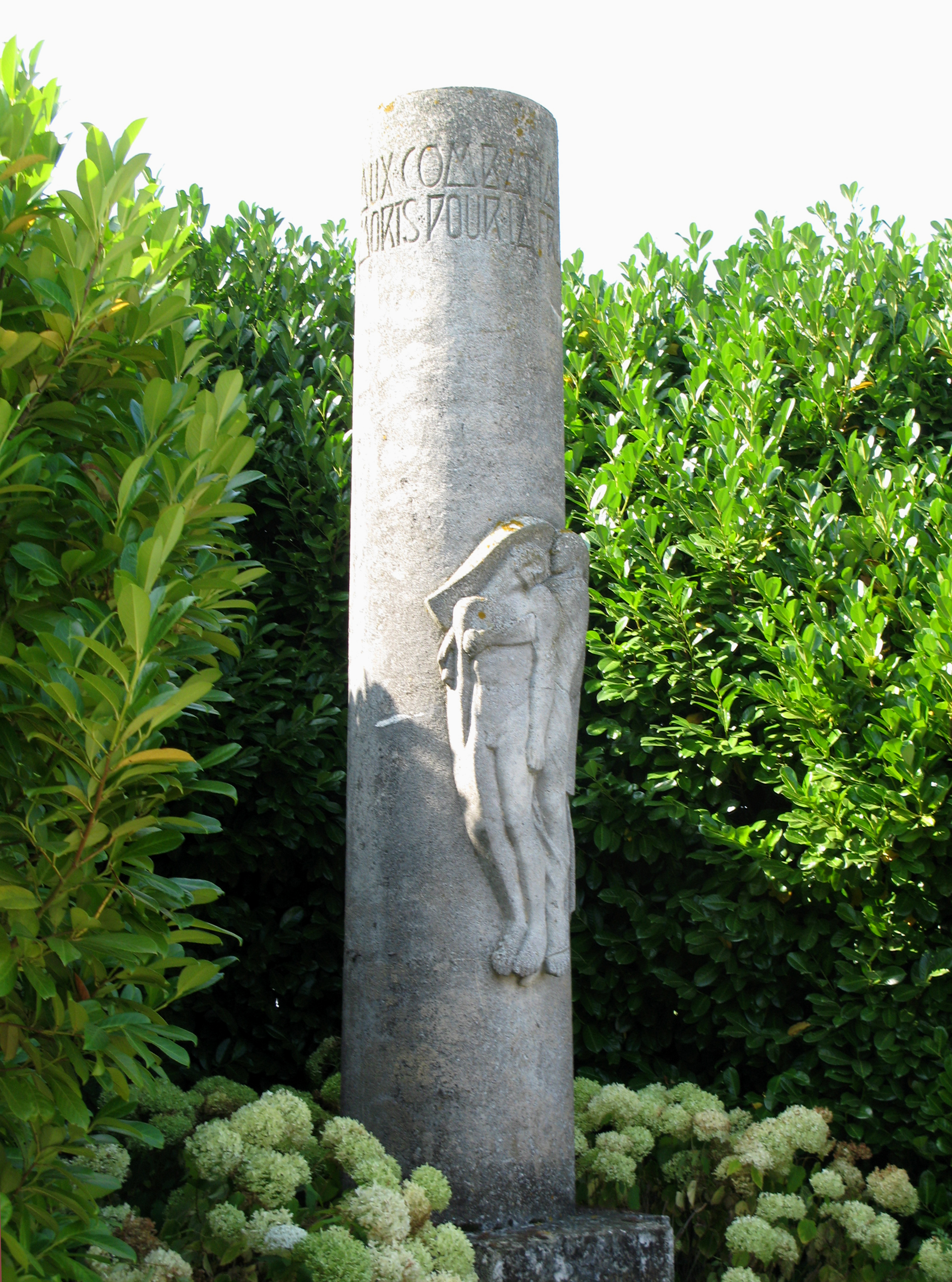
- War memorial
- Location of Missy-aux-Bois
- Location within France Location within Hauts-de-France
- Coordinates: 49°20′15″N 3°15′05″E
- Country: France
- Region: Hauts-de-France
- Department: Aisne
- Arrondissement: Soissons
- Canton: Soissons-2
- Intercommunality: GrandSoissons Agglomération

Government
  - Mayor (2026–32): Alexis Couvreur
- Area^{1}: 3.04 km^{2} (1.17 sq mi)
- Elevation: 118 m (387 ft)
- Highest elevation: 155 m (509 ft)
- Lowest elevation: 69 m (226 ft)
- Population (2023): 100
  - Density: 33/km^{2} (85/sq mi)
- Time zone: UTC+01:00 (CET)
  - Summer (DST): UTC+02:00 (CEST)
- INSEE/Postal code: 02485 /02200
- ^{1} French Land Register data, which excludes lakes, ponds, glaciers > 1 km^{2} (0.386 sq mi or 247 acres) and river estuaries.

Missy-aux-Bois (French pronunciation: [misi o bwa]) is a commune in the Aisne department in Hauts-de-France in northern France.

== Population ==
Historical population
Year	Pop.	±% p.a.
1968	104	—
1975	104	+0.00%
1982	107	+0.41%
1990	107	+0.00%
1999	102	−0.53%
2007	103	+0.12%
2012	112	+1.69%
2017	97	−2.83%
2023	100	+0.51%
Source: INSEE

== See also ==
- Communes of the Aisne department
