= Arboretum de Septmonts =

Park and arboretum in Picardy, France

Coordinates: 49.33°N 3.36°E

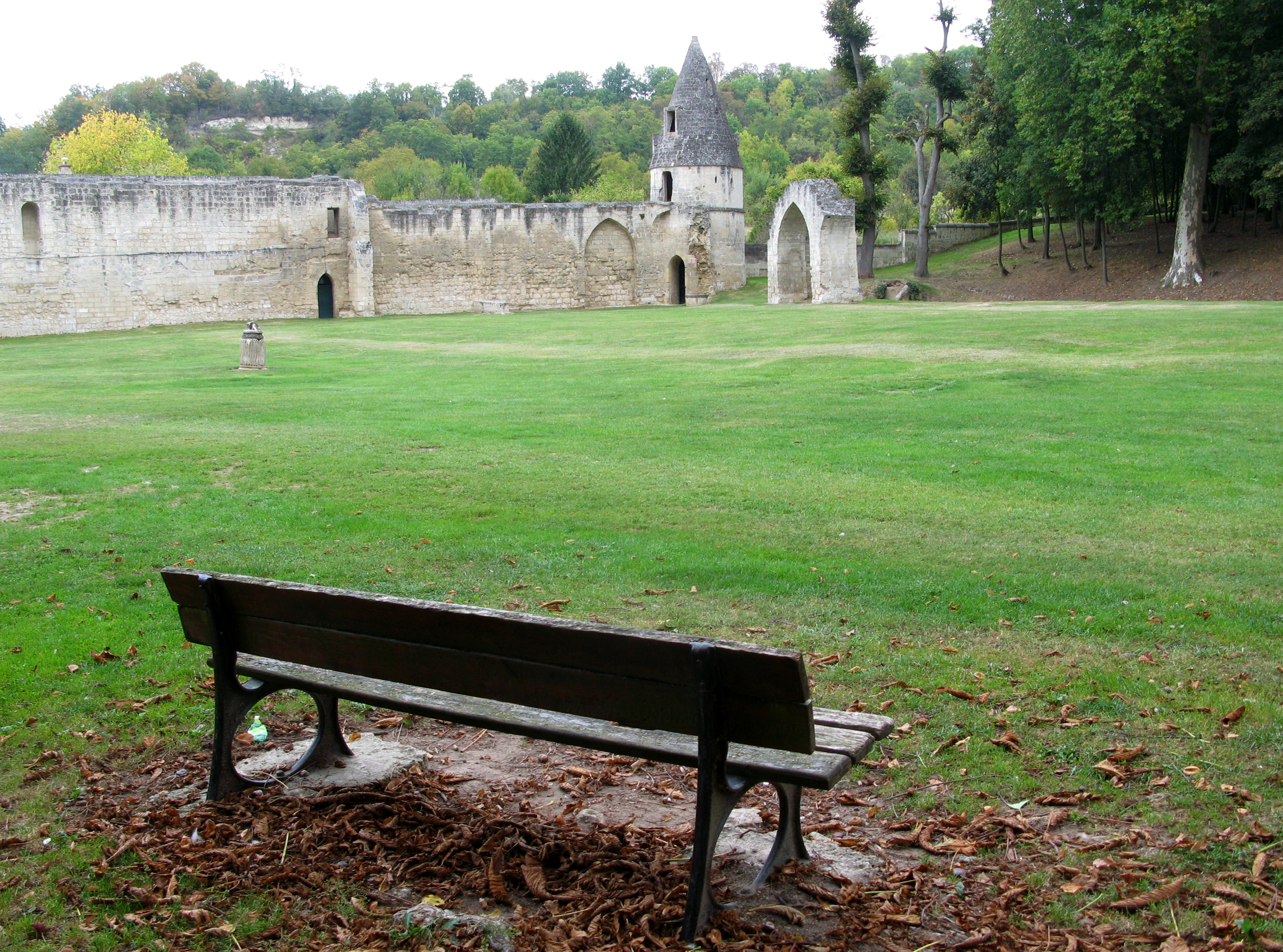
Arboretum de Septmonts

The Arboretum de Septmonts, also known as the Parc du Donjon de Septmonts, is a park and arboretum located at the Place de la Mairie, Septmonts, Aisne, Picardy, France. It is open daily without charge.

The arboretum was created in 1998 within the park of a notable medieval keep (donjon), dating from the 14th century, and formerly the country seat of the Bishop of Soissons. It is organized into three areas displaying trees from Europe, America, and Asia; every year new trees are planted by the town's children. The park also contains an apple orchard, vineyard, and herb garden.

== See also ==
- List of botanical gardens in France
