= Mercin-et-Vaux =

- Commune
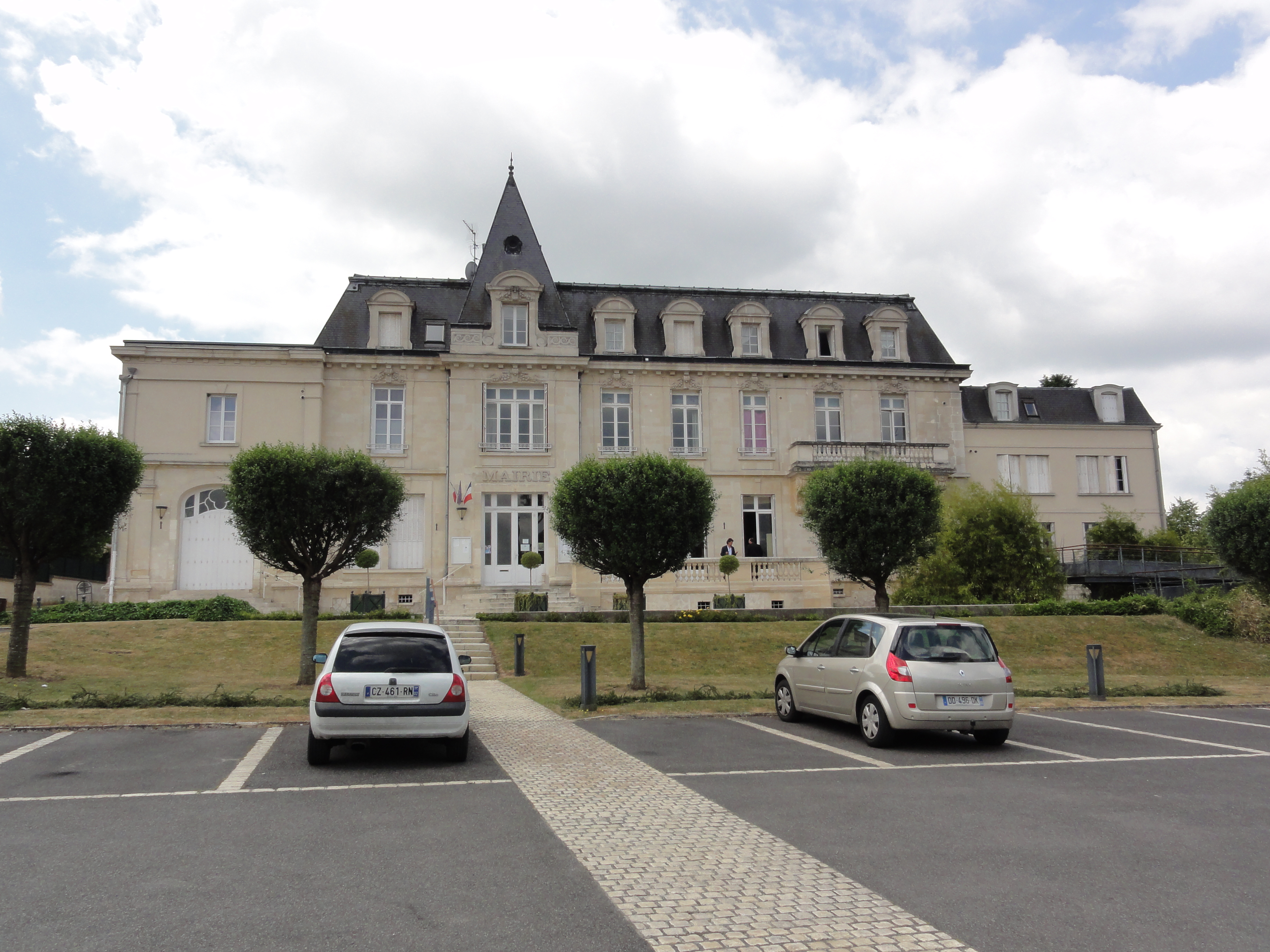
- The town hall of Mercin-et-Vaux
- Location of Mercin-et-Vaux
- Location within France Location within Hauts-de-France
- Coordinates: 49°22′34″N 3°16′37″E
- Country: France
- Region: Hauts-de-France
- Department: Aisne
- Arrondissement: Soissons
- Canton: Soissons-2
- Intercommunality: GrandSoissons Agglomération

Government
  - Mayor (2026–32): Laurent Caudron
- Area^{1}: 7.77 km^{2} (3.00 sq mi)
- Elevation: 53 m (174 ft)
- Highest elevation: 156 m (512 ft)
- Lowest elevation: 41 m (135 ft)
- Population (2023): 935
  - Density: 120/km^{2} (312/sq mi)
- Time zone: UTC+01:00 (CET)
  - Summer (DST): UTC+02:00 (CEST)
- INSEE/Postal code: 02477 /02200
- ^{1} French Land Register data, which excludes lakes, ponds, glaciers > 1 km^{2} (0.386 sq mi or 247 acres) and river estuaries.

Mercin-et-Vaux (French pronunciation: [mɛʁsɛ̃ e vo]) is a commune in the Aisne department in Hauts-de-France in northern France.

== Population ==
Historical population
Year	Pop.	±% p.a.
1968	827	—
1975	880	+0.89%
1982	919	+0.62%
1990	876	−0.60%
1999	919	+0.53%
2007	932	+0.18%
2012	947	+0.32%
2017	962	+0.31%
2023	935	−0.47%
Source: INSEE

== See also ==
- Communes of the Aisne department
