= Acy-Romance =

- Commune
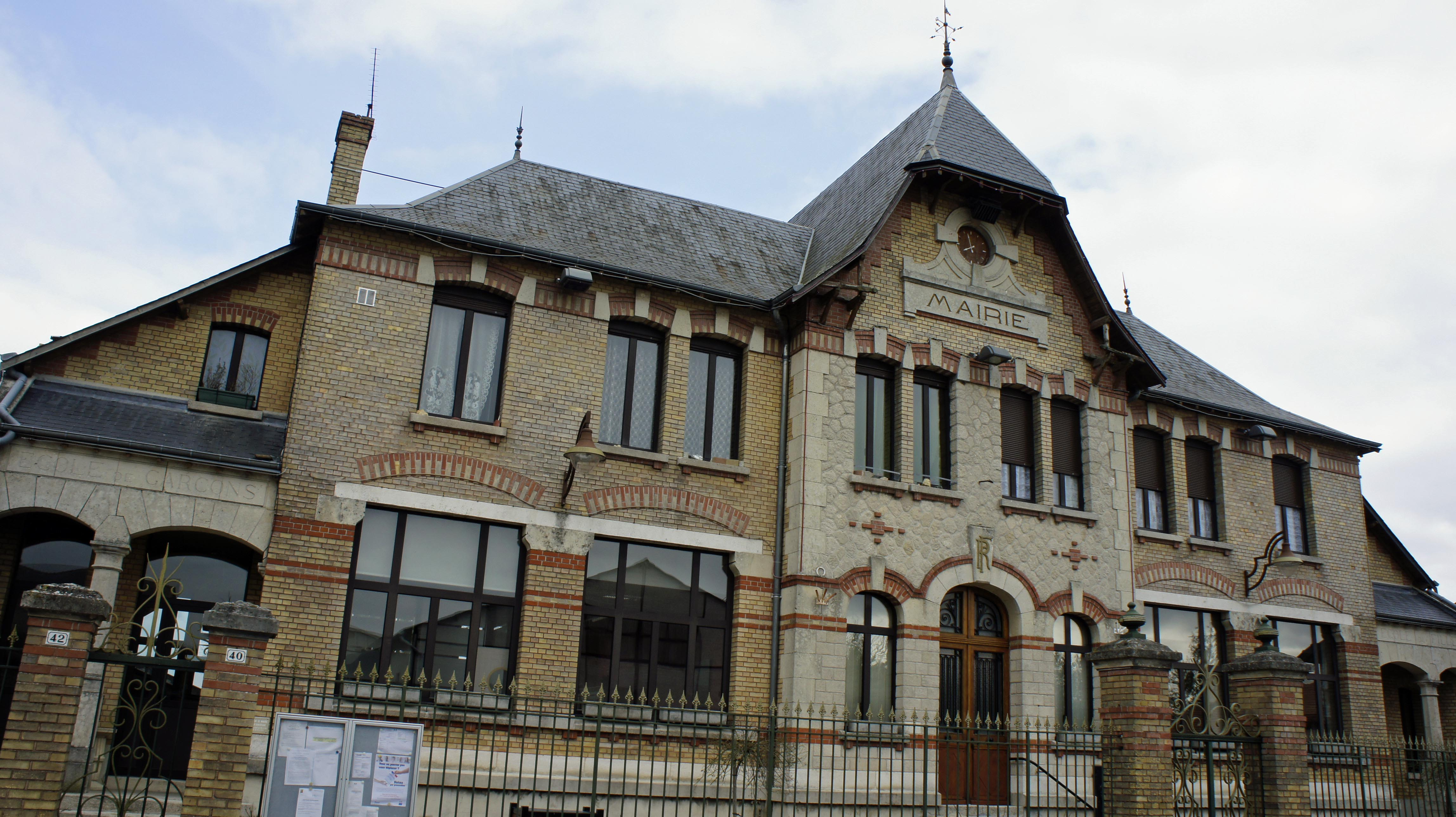
- Town hall

- Coat of arms
- Location of Acy-Romance
- Location within France Location within Grand Est
- Coordinates: 49°30′07″N 4°20′32″E
- Country: France
- Region: Grand Est
- Department: Ardennes
- Arrondissement: Rethel
- Canton: Rethel
- Intercommunality: Pays Rethélois

Government
  - Mayor (2020–2026): Gérard Désiront
- Area^{1}: 11.13 km^{2} (4.30 sq mi)
- Elevation: 73 m (240 ft)
- Highest elevation: 147 m (482 ft)
- Lowest elevation: 67 m (220 ft)
- Population (2023): 479
  - Density: 43.0/km^{2} (111/sq mi)
- Time zone: UTC+01:00 (CET)
  - Summer (DST): UTC+02:00 (CEST)
- INSEE/Postal code: 08001 /08300
- ^{1} French Land Register data, which excludes lakes, ponds, glaciers > 1 km^{2} (0.386 sq mi or 247 acres) and river estuaries.

Acy-Romance (French pronunciation: [asi ʁɔmɑ̃s], before 1962: Acy) is a commune in the Ardennes department in the Grand Est region of northern France.

The commune has been awarded two flowers by the National Council of Towns and Villages in Bloom in the Competition of cities and villages in Bloom.

== Geography ==
Acy-Romance is located some 8 km south east of Château-Porcien and some 40 km north-east of Reims on the E 46 Highway (N 51). Route nationale N 51 forms the south-eastern border of the commune passing through the northern part of the commune as it circles around the city of Rethel which is immediately north-east of Acy-Romance. To reach the town of Acy-Romance it is necessary to exit the N 51 highway onto road D 30 which passes through the town and exits from the western border of the commune towards Château-Porcien. The D18 road connects to Avancon which is 8 km south-west of Acy-Romance town. The Canal des Ardennes traverses the commune from west to east north of the town of Acy-Romance. The Chauss-expo is within the north-eastern border of the commune. The complex for AFPA (National Association for Adult Vocational Training) is located next to the E46 within the western border of the commune.

== Archaeology ==
Discovered by aerial surveys in 1979, there is a protohistoric site on the plateau which has been studied since 1983. The work has been led by Bernard Lambot a native of the area. First brought to light were, a dwelling, a cemetery, three shrines, pottery, tools, all found in different places.

Twenty acres on a plateau overlooking the valley of the Aisne in Acy-Romance commune were excavated between 1986 and 2003 to reveal a Gallic city founded in 180 BC and occupied for about two centuries. The most surprising find was the apparent compartmentalisation of the town that could have more than a thousand permanent inhabitants at its peak. A central square of 3500 square metres was surrounded by palisades to accommodate both collective and public life, markets, meetings, banquets etc. Imposing buildings, probably temples and work houses, were located in the northwest. Three other functional areas with well-defined borders appear on the other sides of the square. They each consist of individual portions of land enclosed by fences of a varying sizes, with houses and outbuildings such as barns, granaries, sheds, and workshops.

- The area is at the northeast of the plateau and close to grazing livestock and can be accessed from the river by a direct pathway.
- In the Southeast, the artisans' quarter has a variety of shophouses.
- To the east, the agricultural area is revealed by farms and granaries, and the proximity of fields in the most exposed areas.

At the edges of the plateau are eight cemeteries, each bordered by an embankment, where buried human remains of 150 people were found. This was only a fraction of the population.

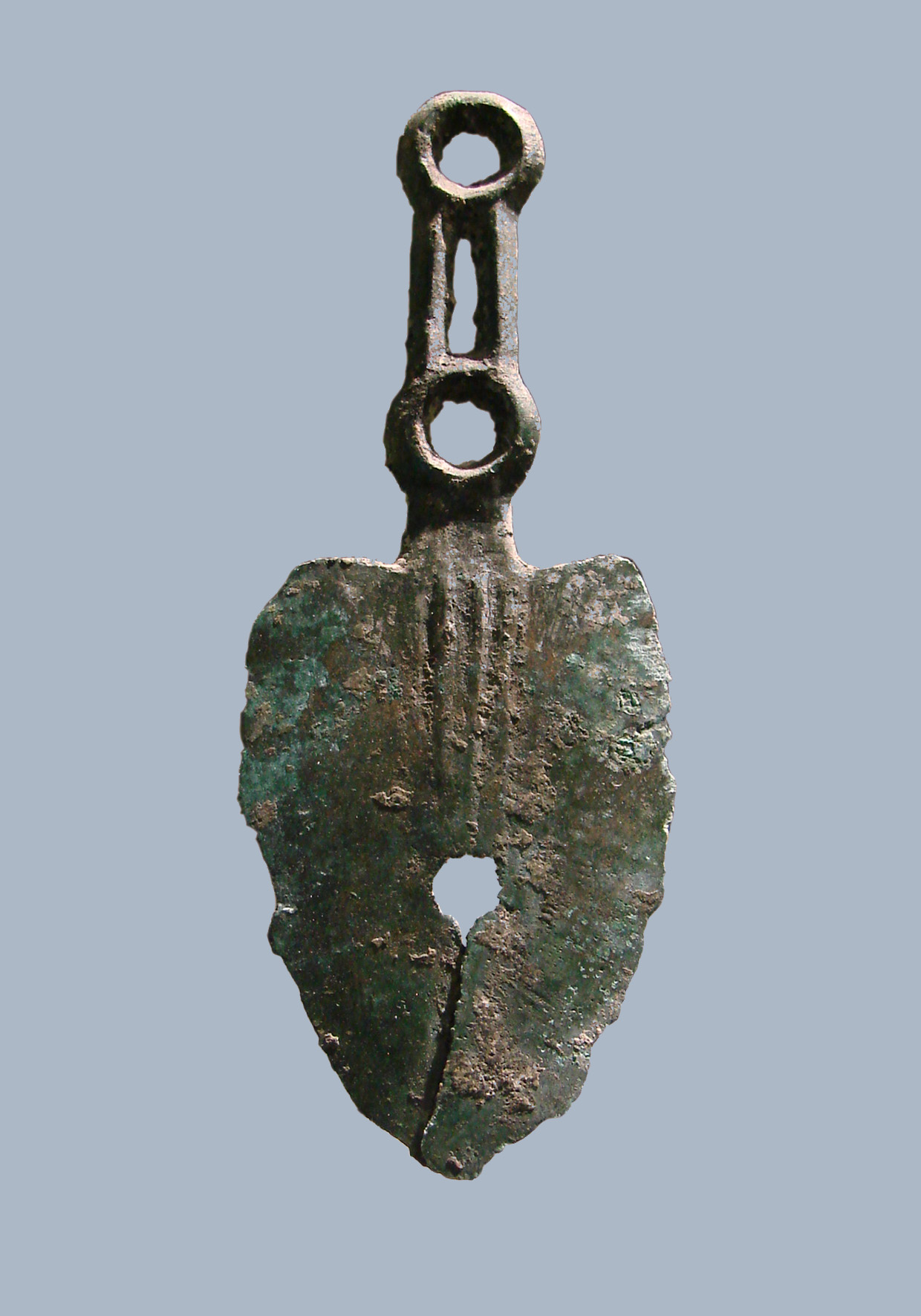
A Bronze Razor: 1st Iron Age from the Hallstatt civilisation found at Acy-Romance

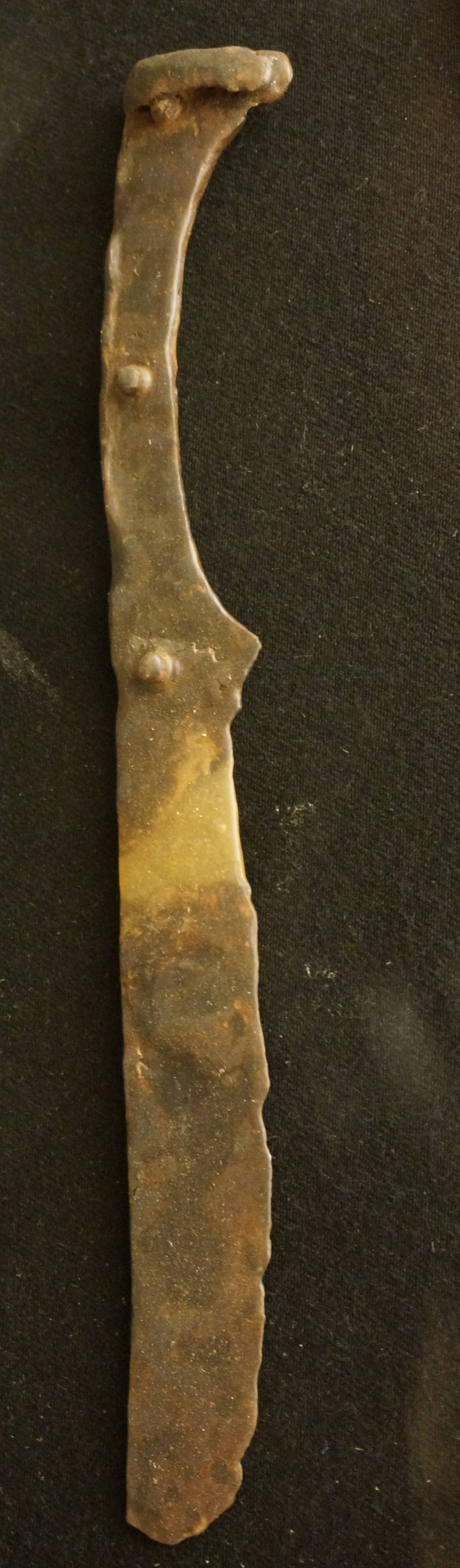
A knife from the 5th century BC found in Acy-Romance

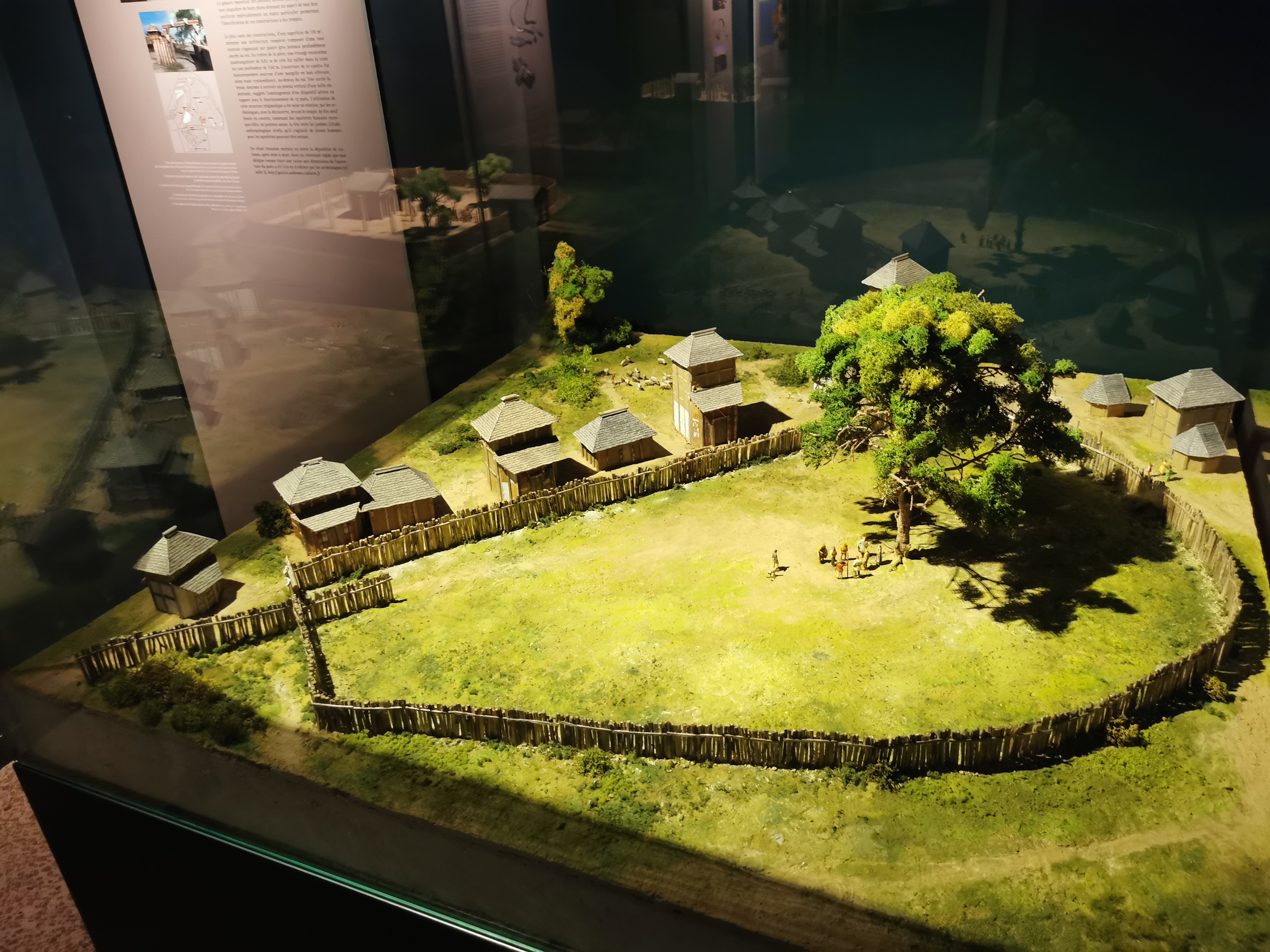
Gallic settlement at Acy-Romance, 180 BC

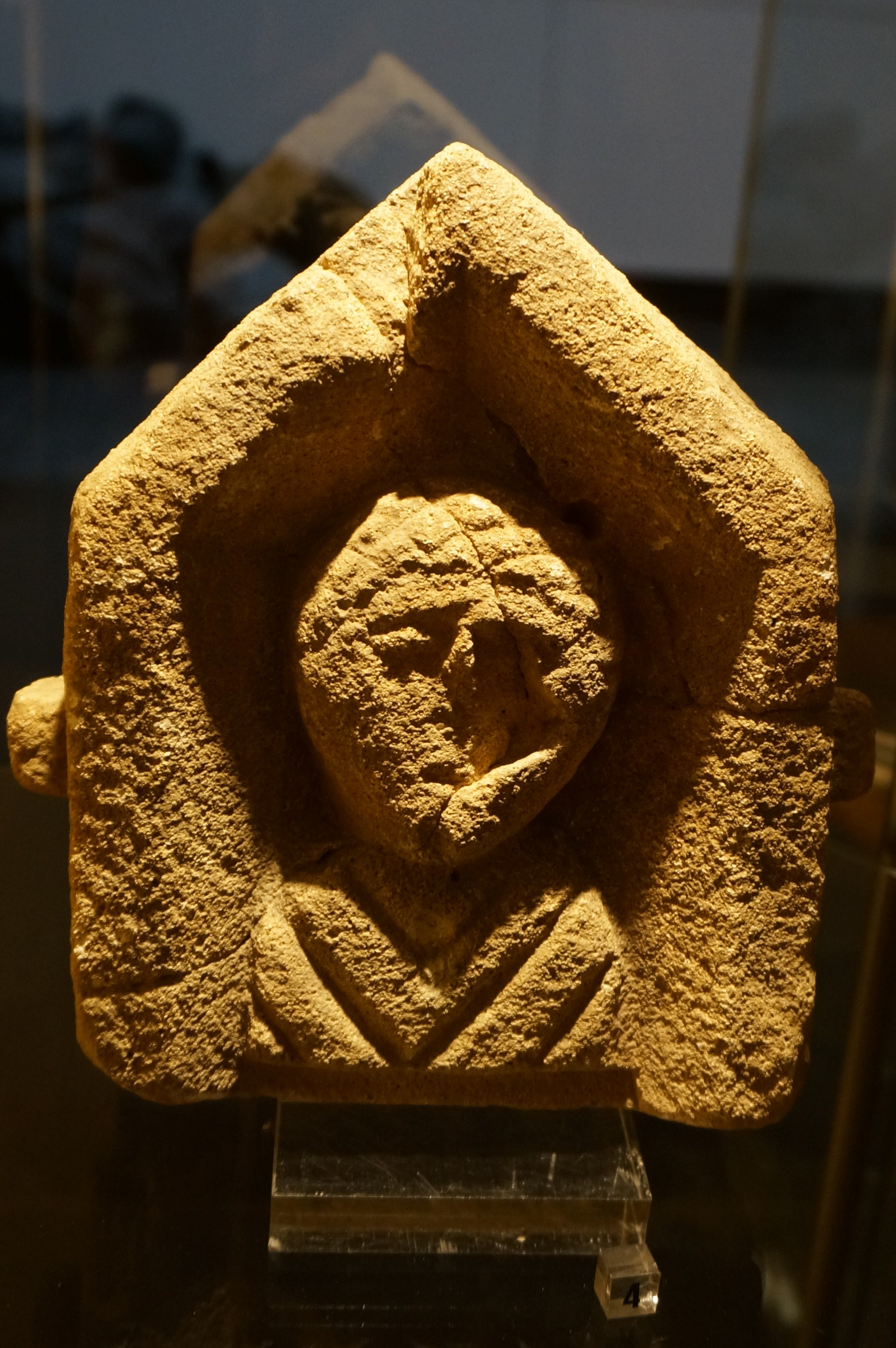
A bust found in Acy-Romance (Ardenne Museum)

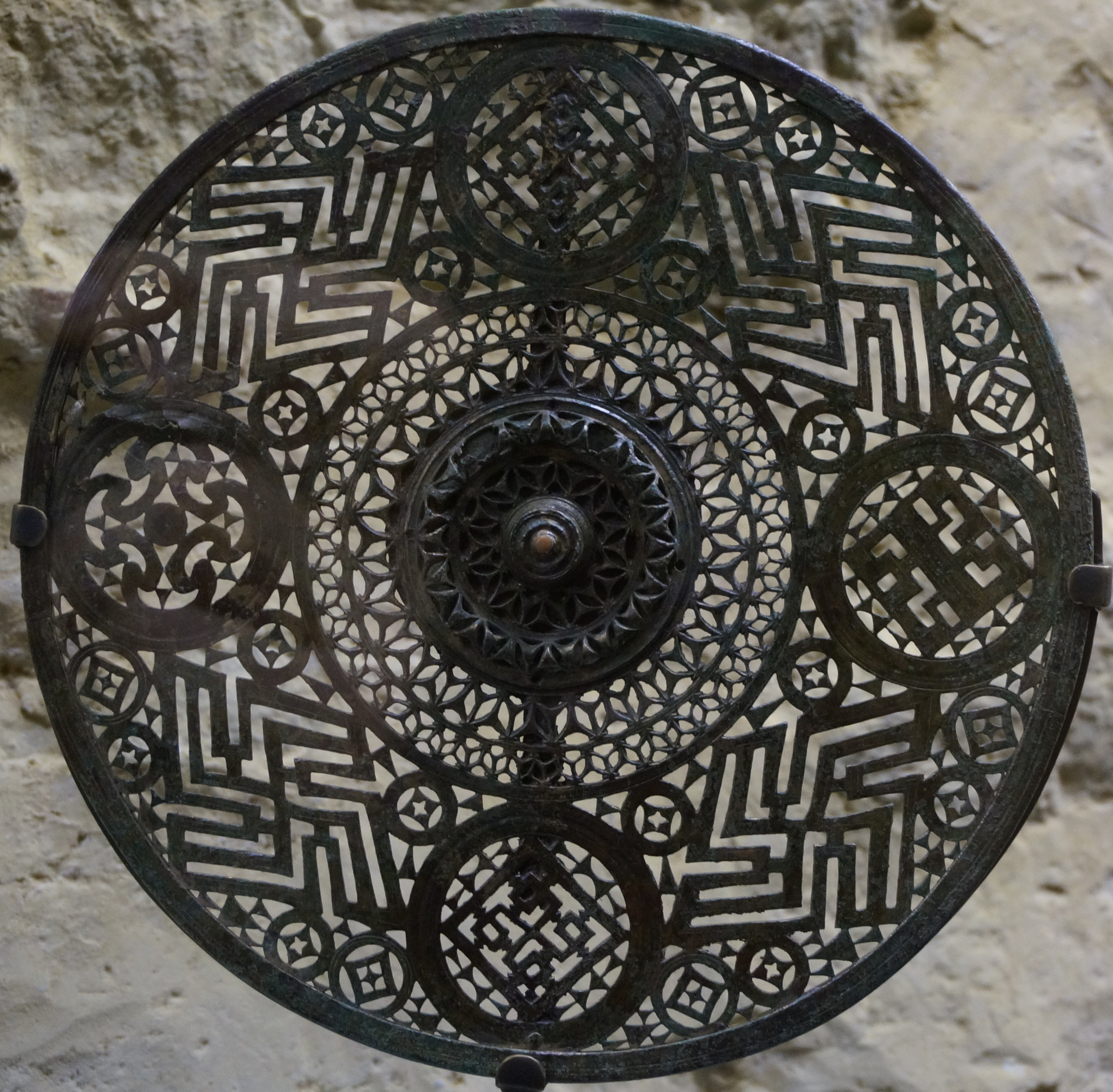
Chariot fitting from the Bourcq chariot burial, 5th-4th century BC

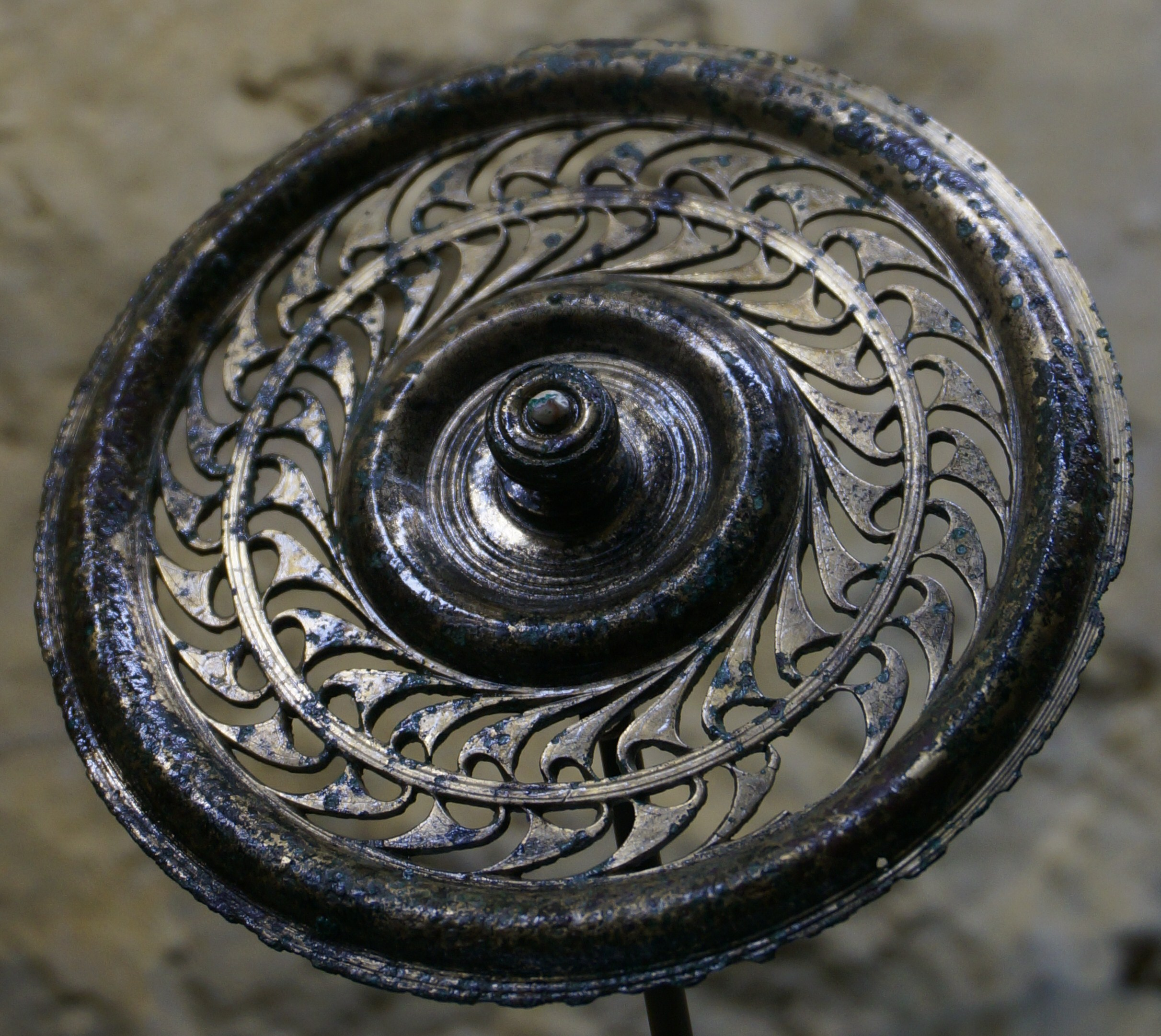
Chariot fitting from the Bourcq chariot burial

== History ==
Acy was the original name of the area and in the middle of the 18th century the suffix Romance was added which was the 12th-century family name of the family who purchased the area.

The archaeological excavations detailed above suggest a much earlier civilization than the 12th century. The Lordship of Acy appeared in the Middle Ages through the record of particular lords. Until the 17th century the lordship was the property of the Colbert family.

In 1750, Hugues-Étienne de Romance, Count of Auteuil and Lord of Mesmont, acquired the Lordship of Acy from Leon de Maugras. In 1752, Louis XV, by letters patent made the land a marquisate in tribute and mark of respect to the family of Romance who were faithfully attached to the king who said: "We commend and change the name of Acy in favour of Romance". The village took the name of Romance.

On 29 December 1770 Hugues-Étienne de Romance (died 17 July 1775) made a declaration and named Jeanne Louis Durfort de Duras, Duchess of Mazarin, in the letters of the Romance Marquisate. In a book of 50 pages of inventory written in 1778 it can be seen that the lord's manor included a large library and many works of art. On 8 December 1790, an order of the directorate of the district of Rethel allowed the commune to resume its old name of Acy without including the name of Romance.

In 1792, the Squire of Romance could not claim his residence in France so it was decided to sequester the property of the Marquis and the Marchioness of Romance was incarcerated for eight months. The Revolution destroyed the castle.

On 12 May 1831 The Municipal Council of Acy protested against the sending by the prefecture of a stamp bearing the name of Acy-Romance. On 29 August 1831, King Louis-Philippe made an order on this and the commune resumed its former name of Acy, until 1921.

From 16 February 1922 in the record of the proceedings of the City Council an official stamp appeared bearing the name of Acy-Romance. On 1 December 1951, in a debate, the Municipal Council, on a proposal from the Prefect of the Ardennes, formally decided that the old designation of Acy applied to the commune will be replaced by that of Acy-Romance. The Prime Minister signed a decree on 3 April 1962 in which the commune of Acy was from then on authorized to bear the name of Acy-Romance.

=== Heraldry ===
Arms of Acy-Romance	Blazon: Quarterly, at 1 of argent a lion sable; at 2 and 3 of azure semy of fleurs-de-lis Or and canton of argent charged with a martlet in sable; at 4 of gules a cinquefoil in argent (Rietstap, Europe).

== Administration ==
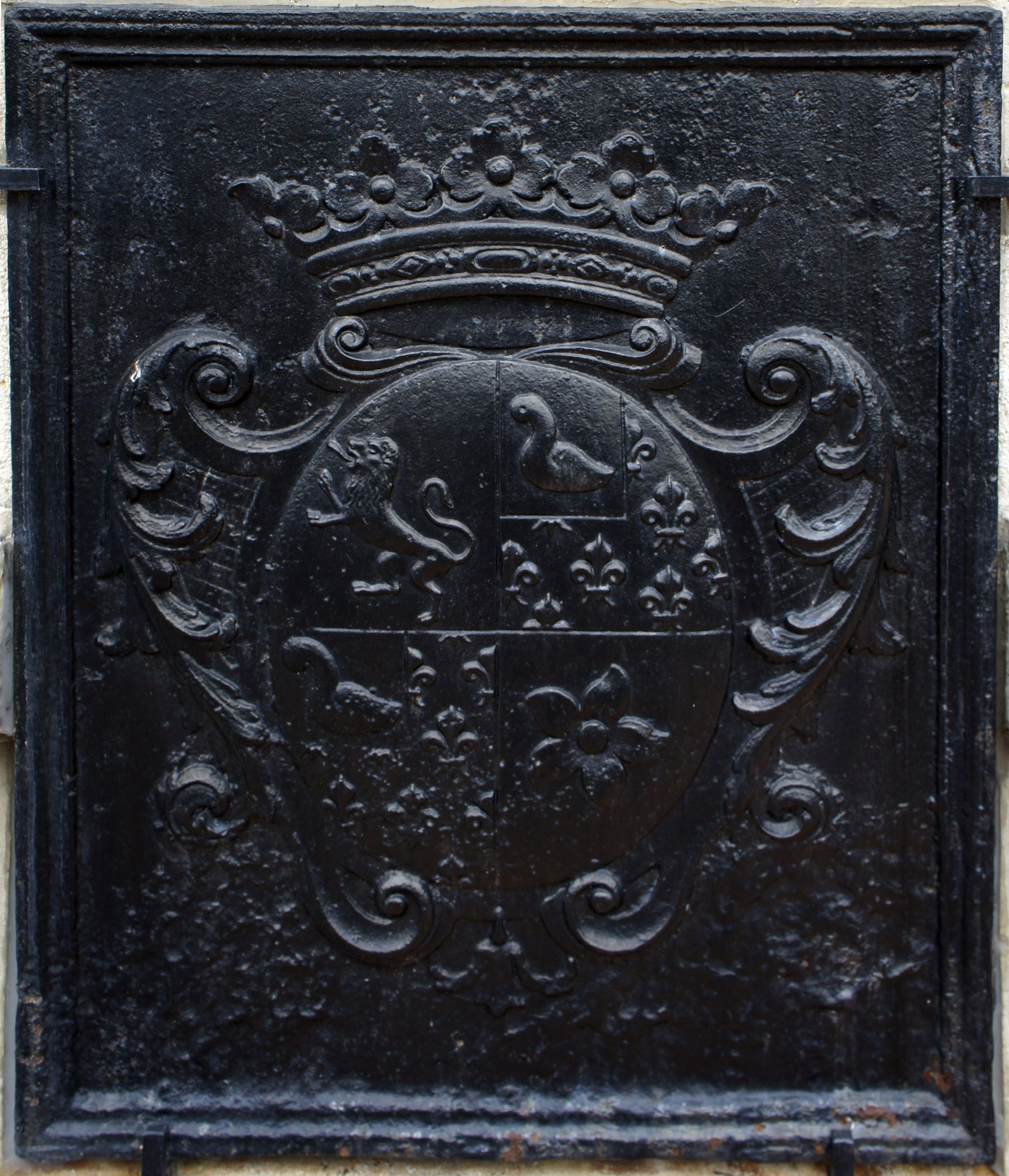
A plaque on the Town Hall

List of Successive Mayors of Acy-Romance
From	To	Name	Party	Position
2001	2020	Joseph Afribo	DVD	Departmental councillor
2020	Current	Gérard Désiront		

== Population ==
The inhabitants of the commune are known as Romanciers or Romancières in French.

Historical population

Year	Pop.	±% p.a.
1793	441	—
1821	490	+0.38%
1846	675	+1.29%
1872	486	−1.26%
1901	341	−1.21%
1926	402	+0.66%
1946	372	−0.39%
1954	803	+10.10%
1962	491	−5.96%

Year	Pop.	±% p.a.
1968	488	−0.10%
1975	479	−0.27%
1982	484	+0.15%
1990	472	−0.31%
1999	443	−0.70%
2007	456	+0.36%
2012	443	−0.58%
2017	446	+0.14%
2023	479	+1.20%

Source: EHESS and INSEE

== Sites and Monuments ==
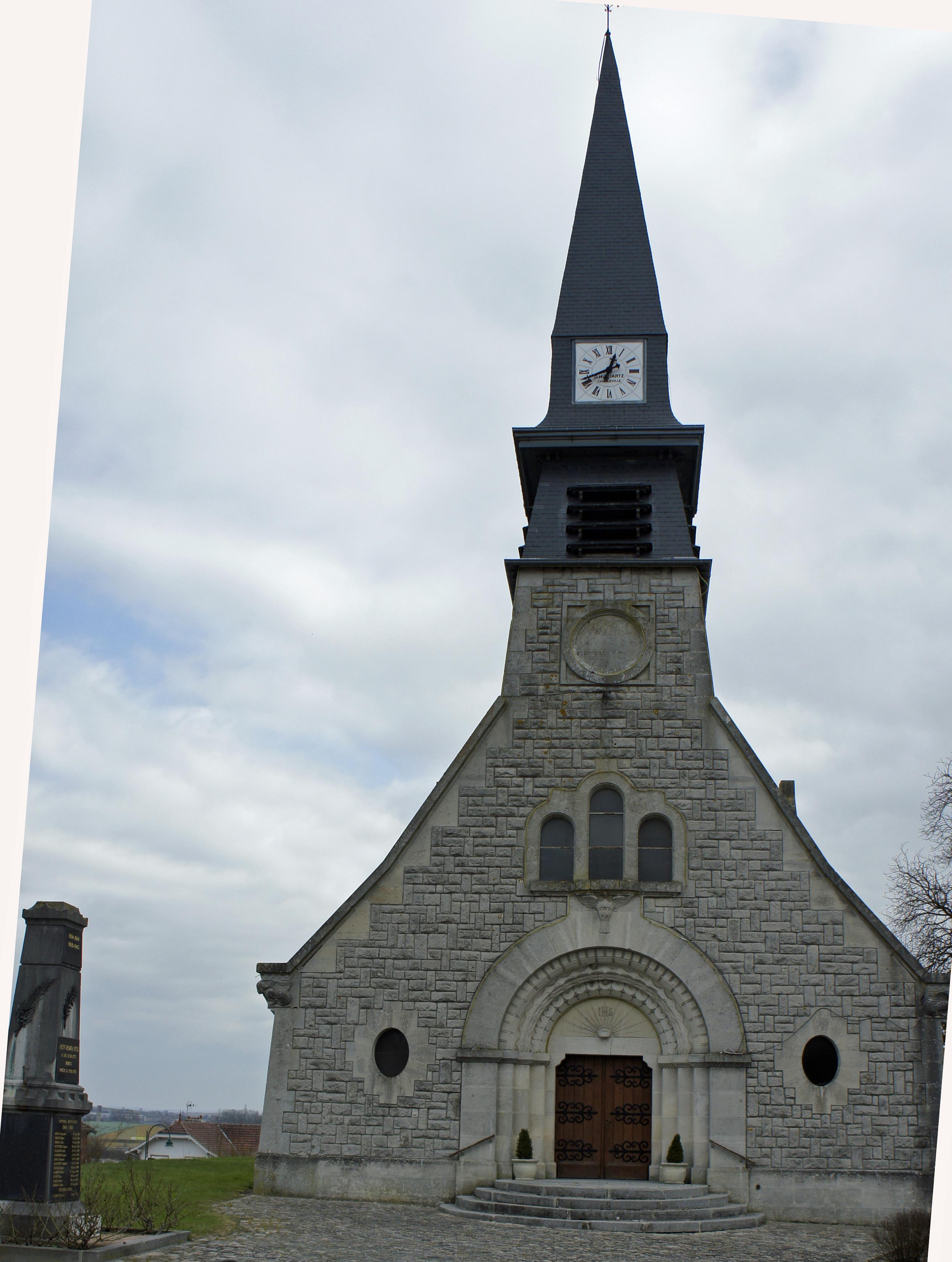
The Church and War memorial of Acy-Romance.

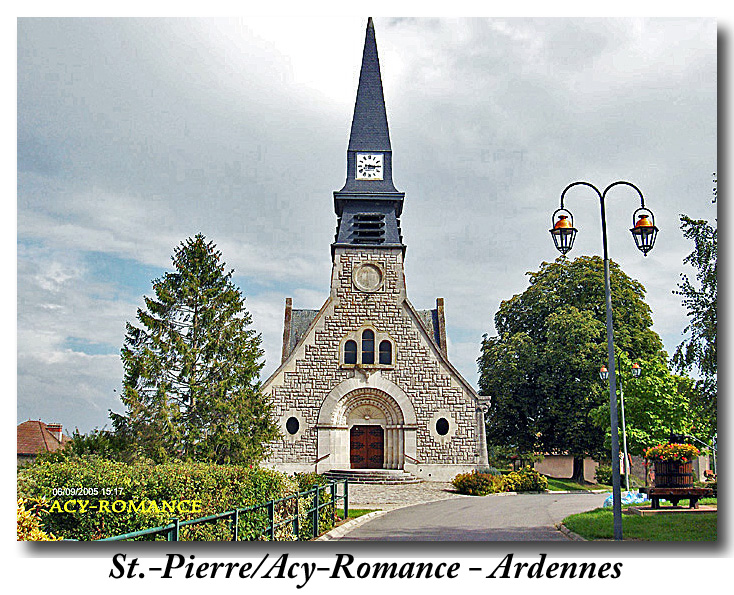
View of the Church forecourt

There was a Celtic agricultural village occupied in 180 BC. for 20 years.

The Church contains many items which are registered as historical objects:

- 4 Capitals (13th century)
- A group of Capitals (13th century)
- A group of Capitals (13th century)
- Capitals on small columns (13th century)
- A semi-circular Capital (13th century)
- A Tombstone for Etienne-Jean-Joseph de Maugres (died 1733) (18th century)
- A Tomb slab for Etienne-Jean-Joseph de Maugres (died 1733) (18th century)
- A Tombstone for Louis de Boutillac (17th century)
- A Tombstone for Hubert de Boutillac (16th century)

== Bibliography ==
- B. Lambot and P. Meniel, The protohistoric site of Acy-Romance (Ardennes). I. Gallic settlements (1988-1990). Memooire of the Champenoise Archaeological Society No. 7, supplement to Bulletin No. 2, Reims, 1992.
- B. Lambot, M. Friboulet, and P. Meniel, in collaboration with L. - P. Delestrée, H. Guillot and I. Le Goff, The proto-historic site of Acy-Romance (Ardennes) - II, The Necropolis in their regional context (Thugny-Trugnyest and aristocratic tombs) 1986-1988-1989. Par. Memoire of the Champenoise Archaeological Society No. 8; Dossier of Protohistoire 5, Reims 1994.
- B. Lambot, The Remains of the beginning of the age of Romanization. Porcelain of the 1st century BC Rev.arch. Picardie, 11, 1996, pp. 13–38 Read online
- B. Lambot, P. Méniel, J. Metzler, About the funeral rites at the end of the Iron Age in the north-east of Gaul, Bulletins and memoires of the Paris Anthropology society, 8-3-4, 1996, p. 329 -343 Read online
- B. Lambot "Essay on the demographic approach to the site of the final dig at Acy-Romance (Ardennes)", Archaeological Review of Picardy, 1–2, 1998, pp. 71–84 Read online
- S. Verger, Rites and areas in Celtic and Mediterranean countries. Comparative study of the sanctuary of Acy-Romance (Ardennes, France), Collection of the French School in Rome, 276, Rome, 2000.

== See also ==
- Communes of the Ardennes department
