= Ambrief =

- Commune
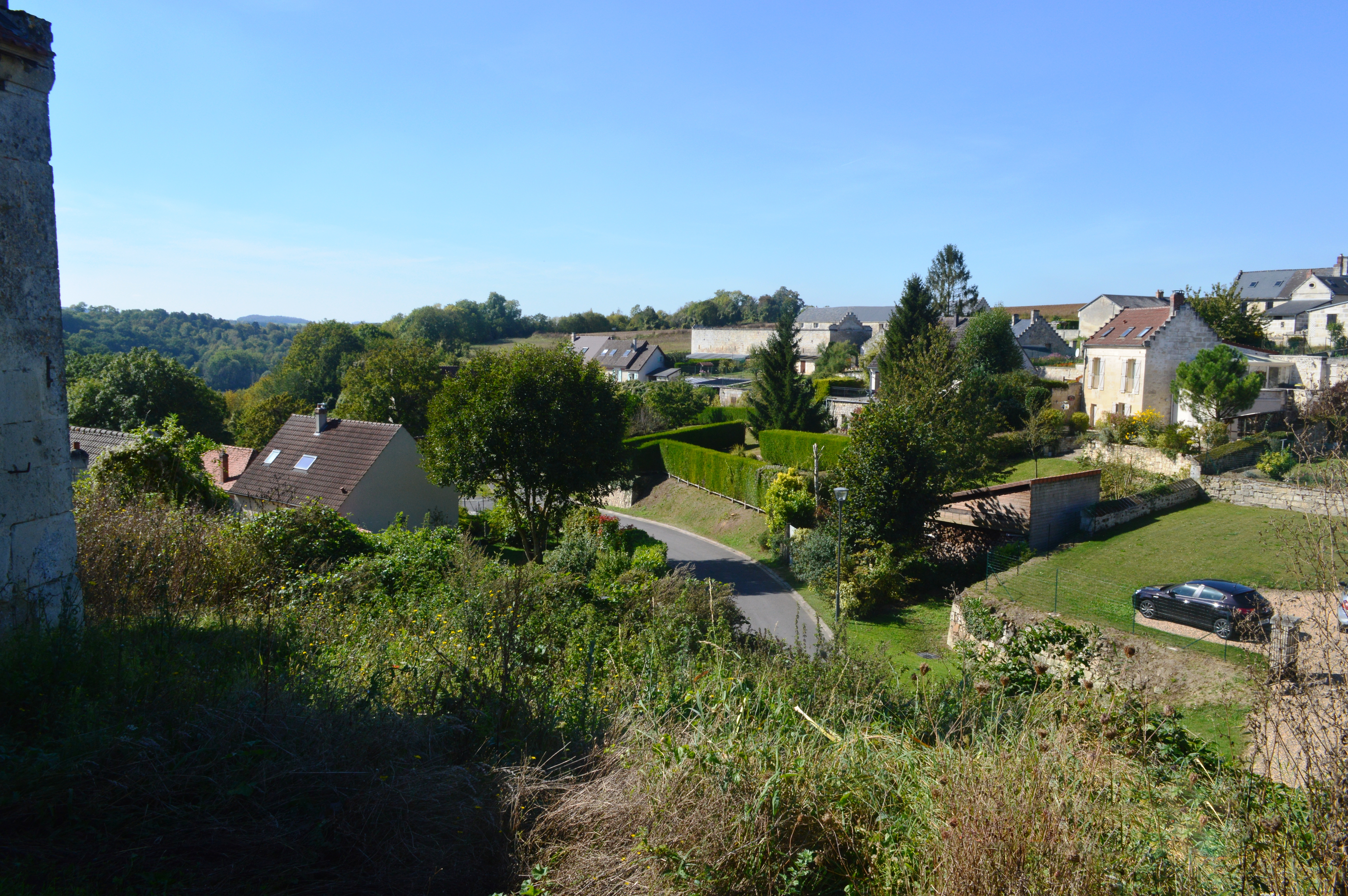
- Location of Ambrief
- Location within France Location within Hauts-de-France
- Coordinates: 49°19′11″N 3°24′07″E
- Country: France
- Region: Hauts-de-France
- Department: Aisne
- Arrondissement: Soissons
- Canton: Villers-Cotterêts
- Intercommunality: Canton d'Oulchy-le-Château

Government
  - Mayor (2026–32): Simon Remy
- Area^{1}: 4.5 km^{2} (1.7 sq mi)
- Elevation: 136 m (446 ft)
- Highest elevation: 166 m (545 ft)
- Lowest elevation: 76 m (249 ft)
- Population (2023): 79
  - Density: 18/km^{2} (45/sq mi)
- Time zone: UTC+01:00 (CET)
  - Summer (DST): UTC+02:00 (CEST)
- INSEE/Postal code: 02012 /02200
- ^{1} French Land Register data, which excludes lakes, ponds, glaciers > 1 km^{2} (0.386 sq mi or 247 acres) and river estuaries.

Ambrief is a commune in the department of Aisne in the Hauts-de-France region of northern France.

== Geography ==
Ambrief is located some 10 km southeast of Soissons and 30 km northeast of Villers-Cotterêts. It can be accessed on the D951 road from the north which passes through the village and continues south to Chacrise. The D6 road forms the northeastern border of the commune. There are also several country roads linking the village to the west and a country road going to the east. There is an area of forest on the eastern side of the village however the rest of the commune is entirely farmland. There are no other villages or hamlets and no identifiable waterways in the commune.

== History ==
Ambrief was a centre for the Knights Templar.

== Population ==
Historical population
Year	Pop.	±% p.a.
1968	119	—
1975	108	−1.38%
1982	87	−3.04%
1990	91	+0.56%
1999	84	−0.89%
2007	64	−3.34%
2012	65	+0.31%
2017	70	+1.49%
2023	79	+2.04%
Source: INSEE

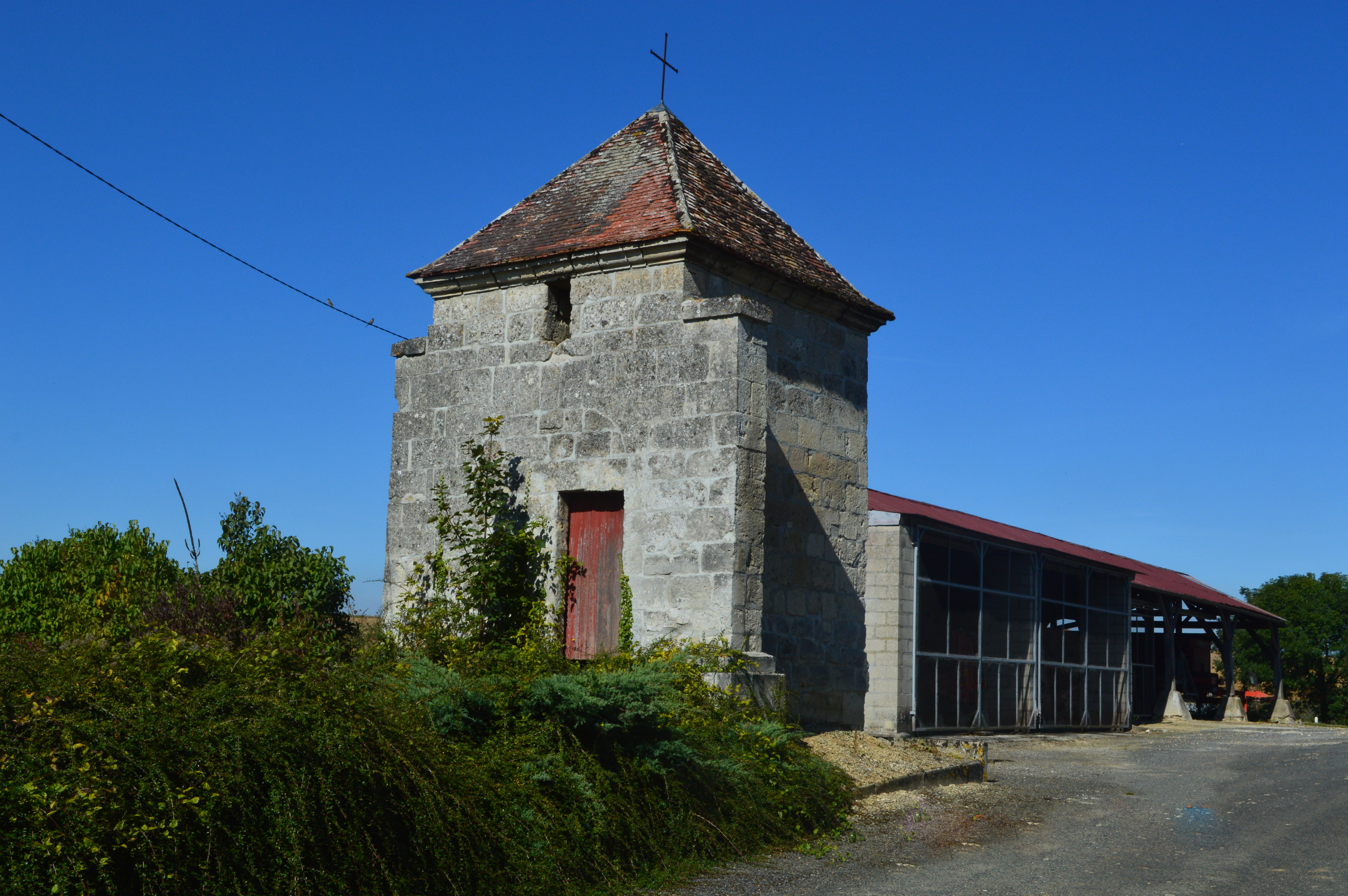
An old tower in Ambrief

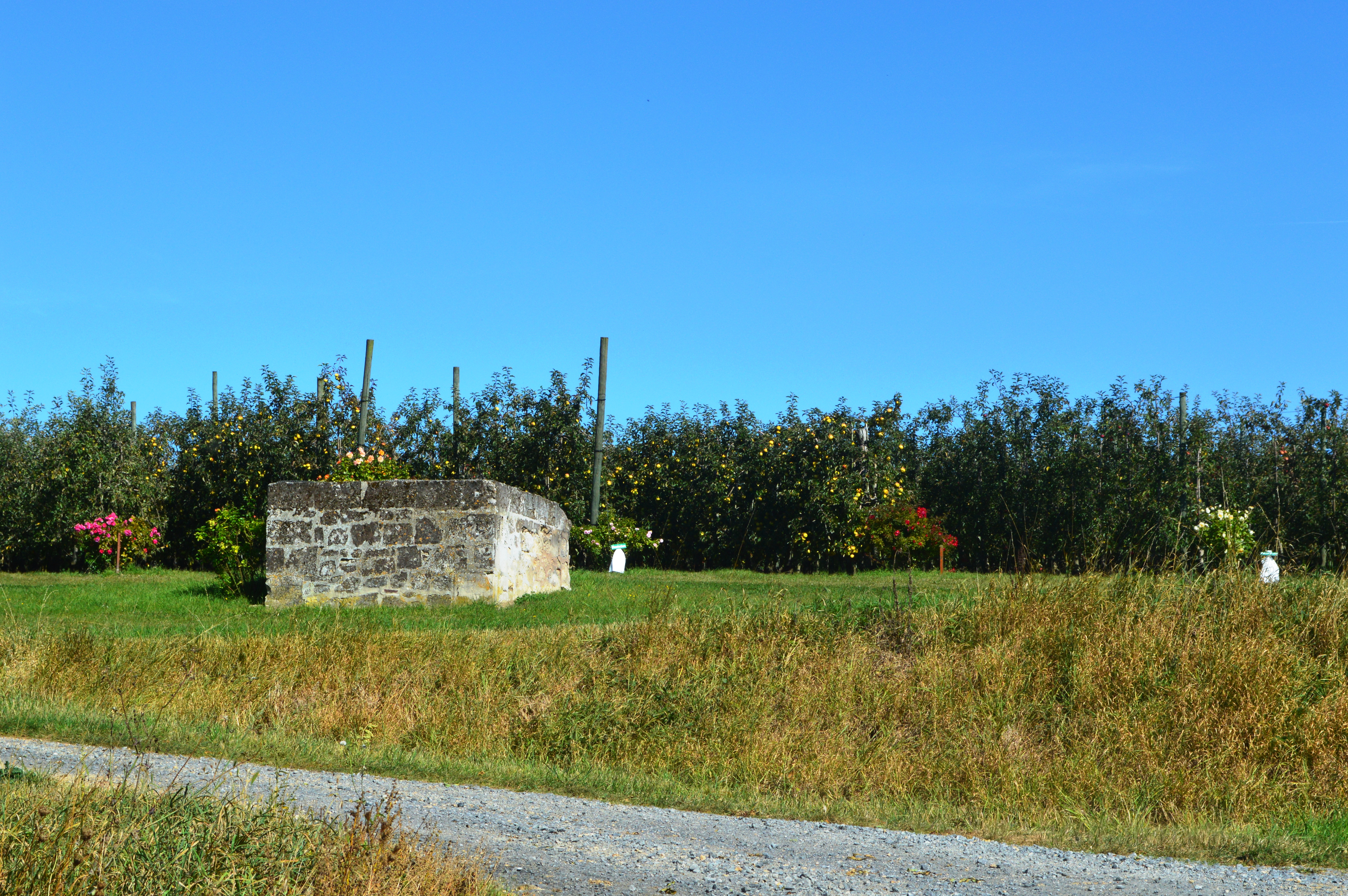
An Ambrief Orchard

== Sites and monuments ==
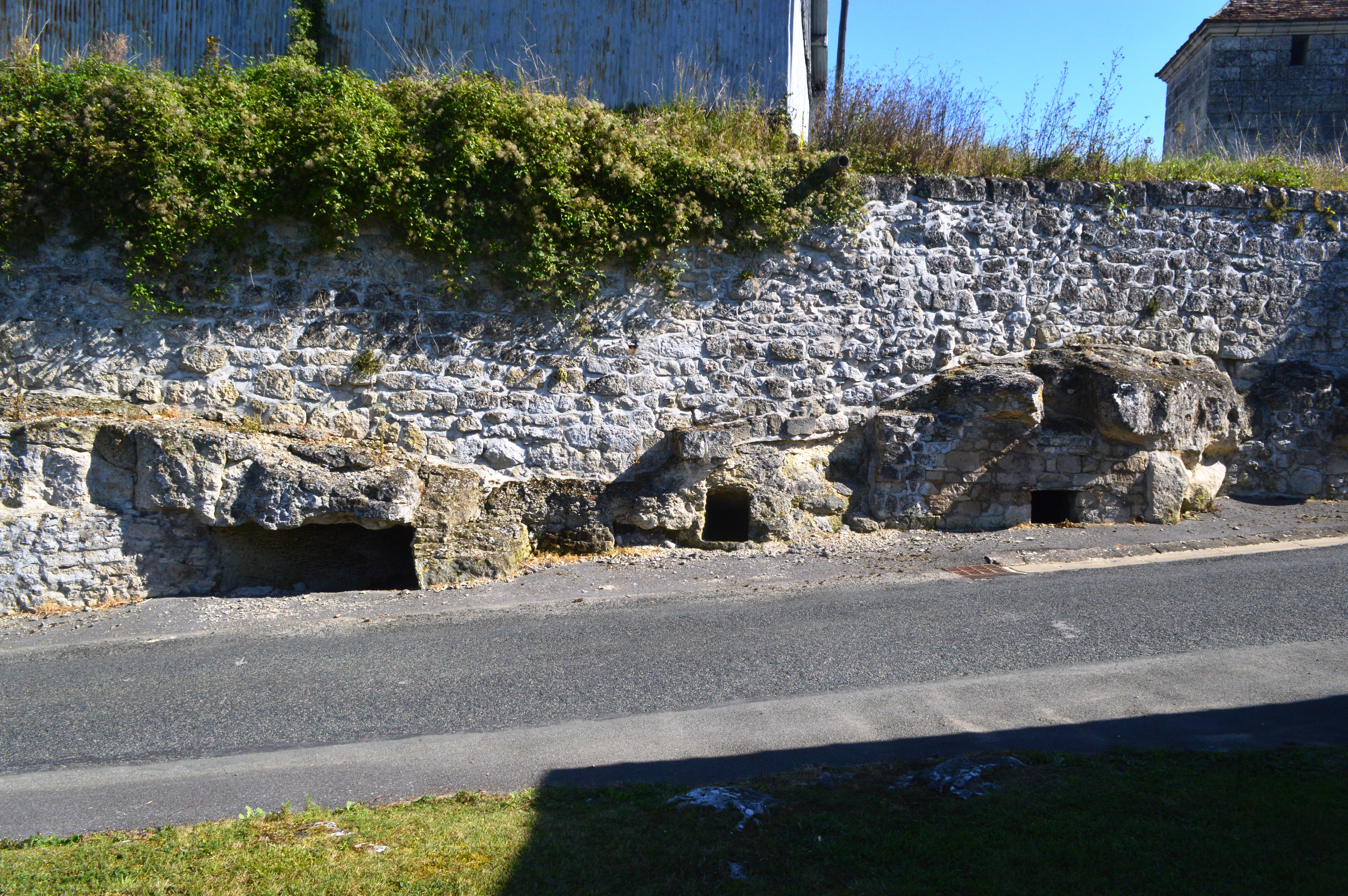
Old Cave Dwellings in Ambrief

- Remains of the "Temple Farm" which was closely related to the commandery of Mount Soissons.
- Many remains of cave dwellings

== Notable people linked to the commune ==
- Nicolas Bertin (1752-1816), General of the French Revolution, born in Ambrief and died at La Ferté-Milon.

== See also ==
- Communes of the Aisne department
