= Serches =

- Commune
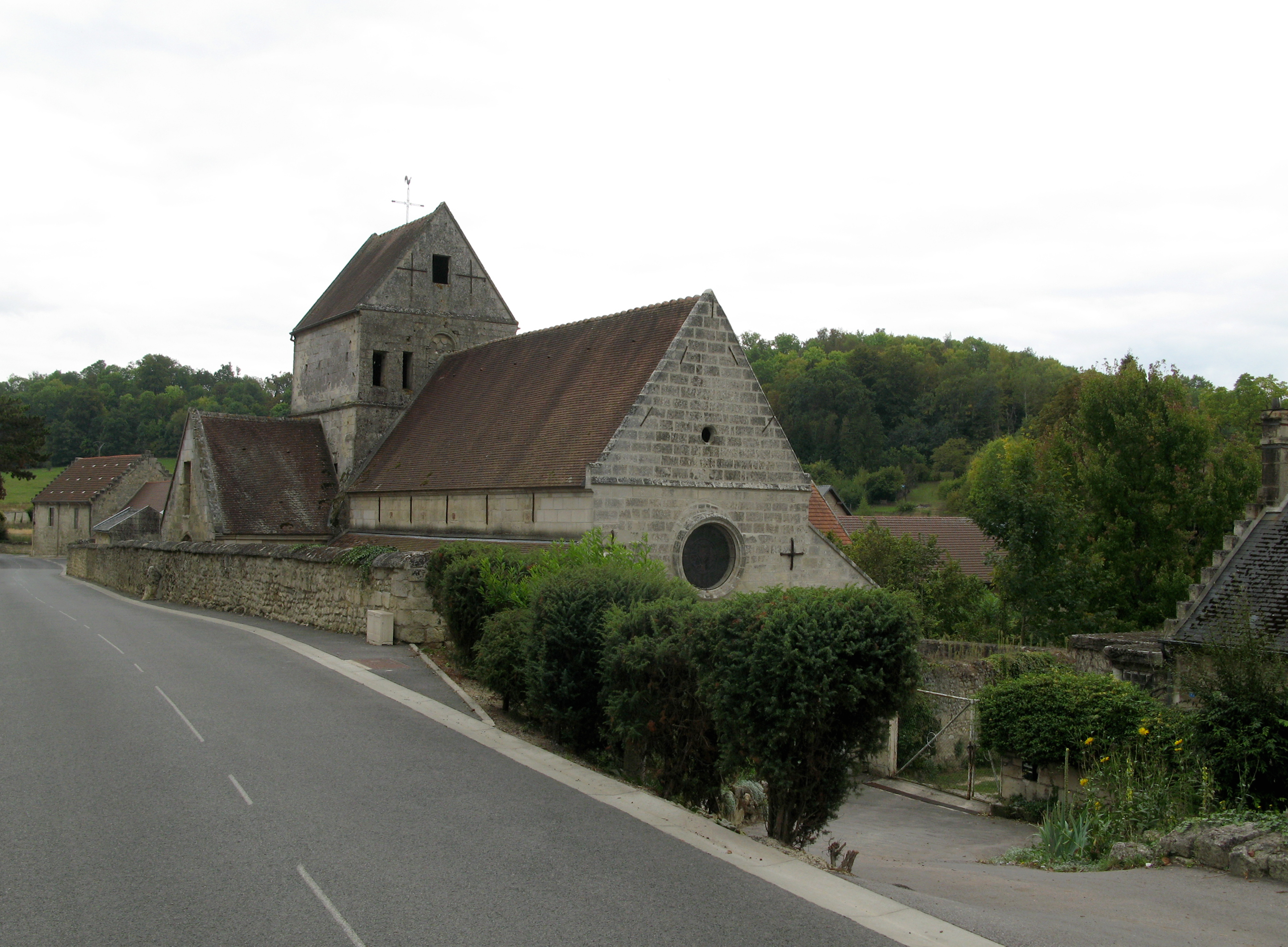
- The church of Serches
- Location of Serches
- Location within France Location within Hauts-de-France
- Coordinates: 49°20′24″N 3°26′56″E
- Country: France
- Region: Hauts-de-France
- Department: Aisne
- Arrondissement: Soissons
- Canton: Soissons-2
- Intercommunality: GrandSoissons Agglomération

Government
  - Mayor (2026–32): Loïc Lalys
- Area^{1}: 9.1 km^{2} (3.5 sq mi)
- Elevation: 86 m (282 ft)
- Highest elevation: 173 m (568 ft)
- Lowest elevation: 67 m (220 ft)
- Population (2023): 273
  - Density: 30/km^{2} (78/sq mi)
- Time zone: UTC+01:00 (CET)
  - Summer (DST): UTC+02:00 (CEST)
- INSEE/Postal code: 02711 /02220
- ^{1} French Land Register data, which excludes lakes, ponds, glaciers > 1 km^{2} (0.386 sq mi or 247 acres) and river estuaries.

Serches (French pronunciation: [sɛʁʃ]) is a commune in the Aisne department in Hauts-de-France in northern France.

== Population ==
Historical population
Year	Pop.	±% p.a.
1968	310	—
1975	282	−1.34%
1982	254	−1.48%
1990	304	+2.27%
1999	293	−0.41%
2007	296	+0.13%
2012	319	+1.51%
2017	309	−0.63%
2023	273	−2.04%
Source: INSEE

== See also ==
- Communes of the Aisne department
